= Hoflößnitz =

Winery and museum in Radebeul, Germany

Coordinates: 51°06′42″N 13°39′43″E

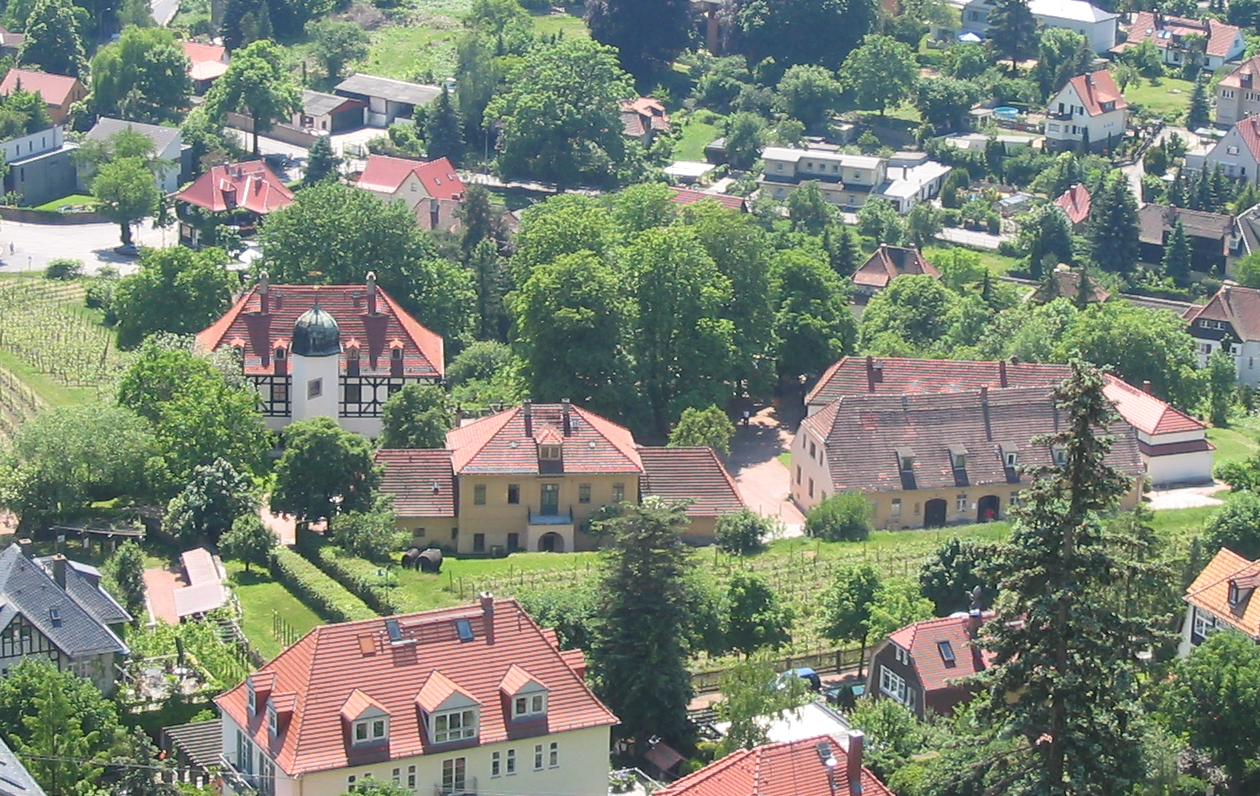
Center: The Hoflößnitz; estate complex from the Bismarck Tower (bottom left the large building of the former State Winery School)

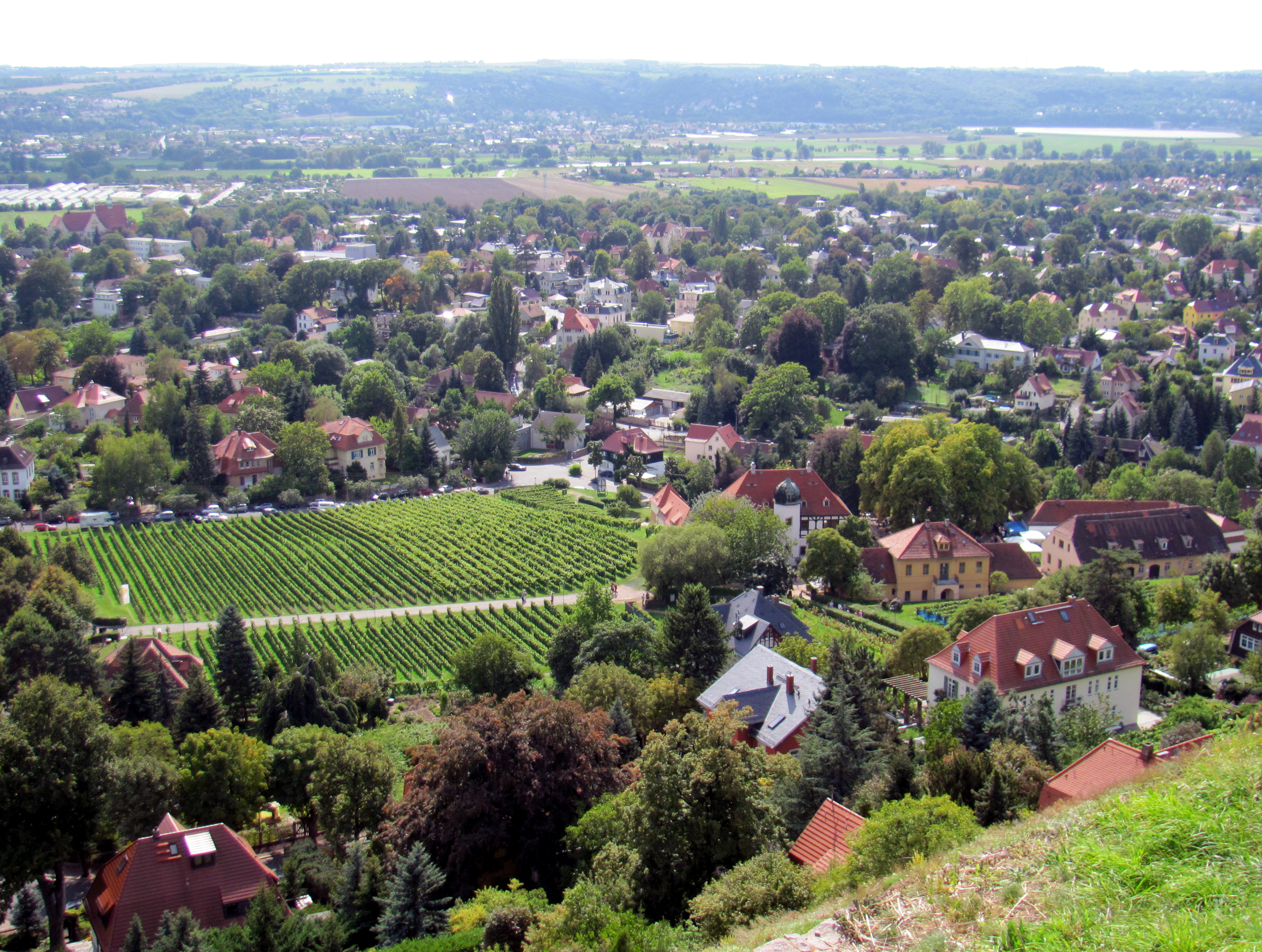
Hoflößnitz and vineyard Schlossberg, behind it the Elbe Valley and left-side Elbe heights: View from Eggersweg below the Bismarck Tower

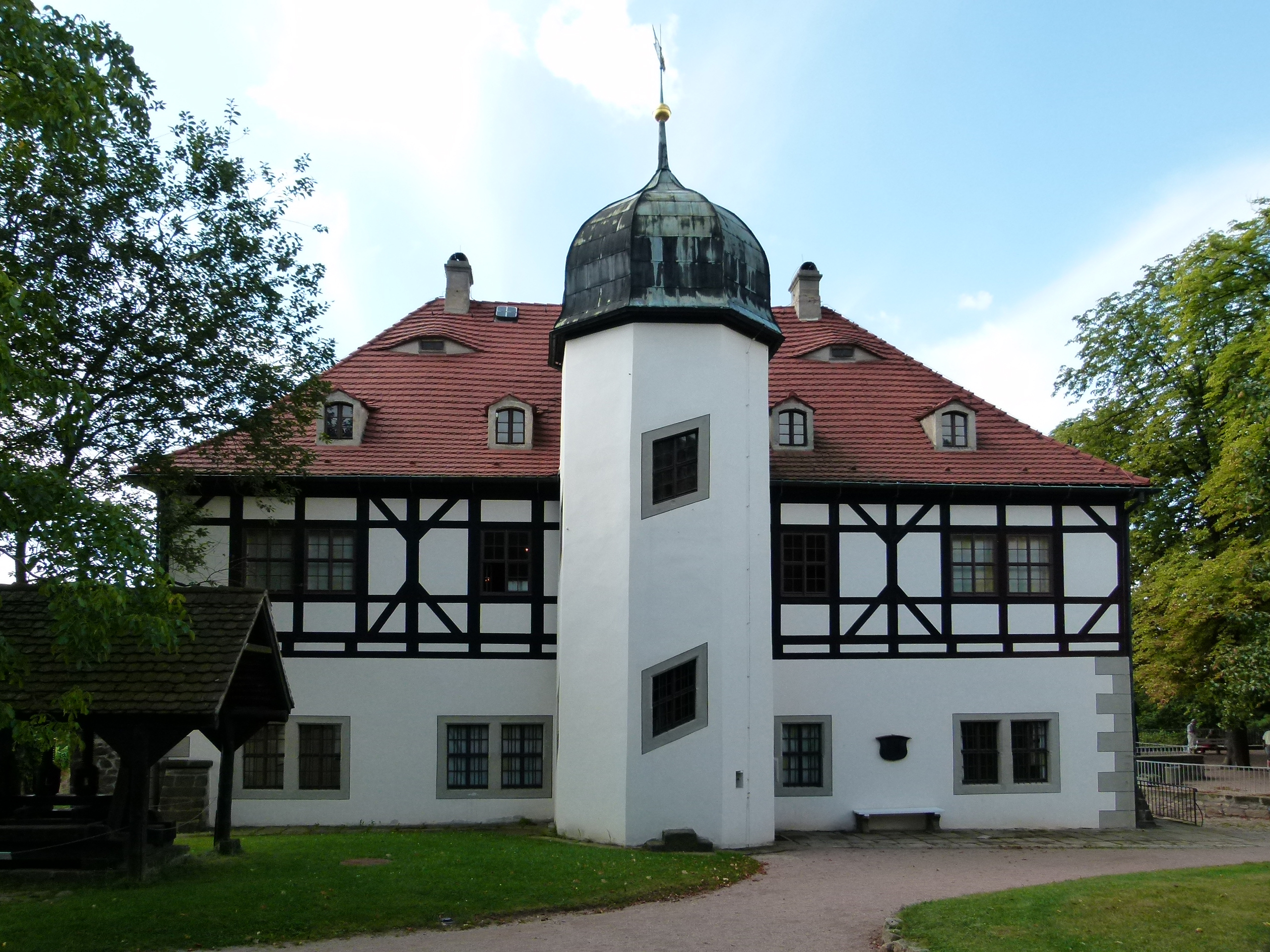
The Mountain and Pleasure House, romantically also Schloss Hoflößnitz

The Hoflößnitz is the municipal winery in Radebeul (district Oberlößnitz) on the Saxon Wine Route.

In the electoral and royal Saxon period, the estate was a country seat of the Saxon line of the Wettins for almost 500 years and the center of courtly Saxon vineyard ownership. Today it has been developed into the Saxon Winegrowing Museum Hoflößnitz with a sales outlet and its own wine dispensing. The winery belongs to the Lößnitz large vineyard site, single site Goldener Wagen.

The Hoflößnitz with Mountain and Pleasure House, press house, cavalier house and wine press is listed as a heritage ensemble (Ensembleschutz) under heritage protection. In addition, the open and green space around the Hoflößnitz is considered a work of landscape and garden design within the heritage protection area Historic Vineyard Landscape Radebeul. The Hoflößnitz also includes the vintner's house located below and to the right of the ascent or the gate system with attached bakehouse as well as the former wood yard to the left toward the property, also with a vintner's house.

The main house of the winery complex is described in detail in Berg- und Lusthaus Hoflößnitz. The 80 bird oil paintings from the Dutch painter Albert Eckhout on the ceiling of the banquet hall there are listed in the List of Bird Paintings by Albert Eckhout in the Hoflößnitz.

The Hoflößnitz is a “unique testimony to viticulture in the Elbe Valley and courtly culture and lifestyle in Saxony, especially in the 17th and 18th centuries, [the] pleasure house with remarkable furnishings, especially the Baroque paintings, [the] complex overall of incomparable urban, art-historical, cultural-historical and landscape-designing effect”.

== Definition ==
The information presented here portrays the Hoflößnitz in three ways: as a historic site, as a modern municipal institution, and as a Saxon cultural monument.

Even though during the Historicism period the romantic designation Schloss became established, the Hoflößnitz was in the true sense a, albeit electoral or royal, winery. The Mountain and Pleasure House, thus the vineyard palace, was less a country seat as a permanent residence of a noble estate owner than rather a pleasure house for the Elector when he celebrated his wine festivals at the Hoflößnitz or stopped there on the way to the hunt. The historicistically named cavalier house was as mountain administrator house the actual administrative center of the daily work of one of the two mountain administrators responsible for all Saxon viticulture, under whom a mountain bailiff as well as chief vintners and vintners with all their assistants were subordinate. The mountain bailiff lived in the wood yard below.

=== Naming ===
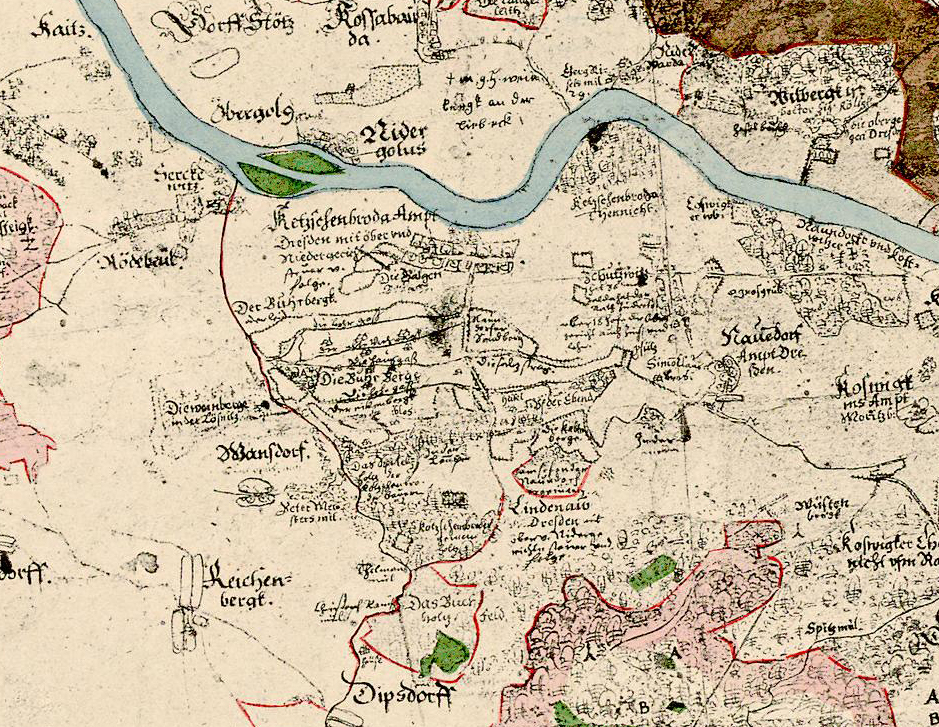
Southern representation by Oeder 1607, Plate IX, excerpt Lößnitz

The name, probably derived from the Old Sorbian lěsnica (forest stream), referred to the 6.7 kilometer long Lößnitzbach directly west of the later Hoflößnitz. This flows through the gorge now called Lößnitzgrund, which separated the vineyard area mentioned in 1271 as Kötzschbergisches Weingebirge north of the Anger of Kötzschenbroda in the west from the vineyards of the villages Serkowitz and Alt-Radebeul to the east. In 1286, a fief document of the Meissen Bishop for the Dresden Maternihospital first mentioned the Weinberg Lezenitzberg belonging to Kötzschenbroda.

In the First Electoral Saxon Land Survey, the surveyor Matthias Oeder designated the vineyards around the Lezenitzberg in 1607

Die weinberge in der Lösnitz

. The designation later applied to the entire vineyard area, within which the electoral Hoflößnitz lay above Serkowitz, which Christian Gerber mentioned in 1717:

The Lößnitz is a certain stretch where there are only high mountains that bear exquisite wine, and because the Electoral mountains are also there, this area is called the Hoffe-Lößnitz. And this Lößnitz wine is also the best in the whole country, which in good wine years is preferable to Franconian wine, but equal to Rhine wine.

=== Hoflößnitz as historic site ===
With the acquisition of three vineyard parts and a wine press in 1401, the ruling Wettins founded there the center of courtly Saxon viticulture. Vintners with their assistants and their families lived on the vineyards belonging to the estate. The electoral winery did not belong to the commune on whose land it lay, but was directly subordinate to the Amt Dresden. The Hoflößnitz was parished to the Kirche zu Kötzschenbroda, the oldest parish in the area. When Elector Johann Georg I. stayed at the Hoflößnitz, the Kötzschenbroda pastor Augustin Prescher was responsible for him. In the state lexicon of 1817, Hoflößnitz is listed as its own place with 131 inhabitants. In 1836, two years after the conversion of the royal winery into a state domain, when the school district Niederlößnitz-Lindenau was created for the Niederlößnitz Vineyard Association, five children from Hoflößnitz were enrolled in the newly built elementary school in Niederlößnitz. Although the surrounding Oberlößnitz had already been founded as a commune in 1839, it took until 1875 for the Hoflößnitz to become part of this rural commune.

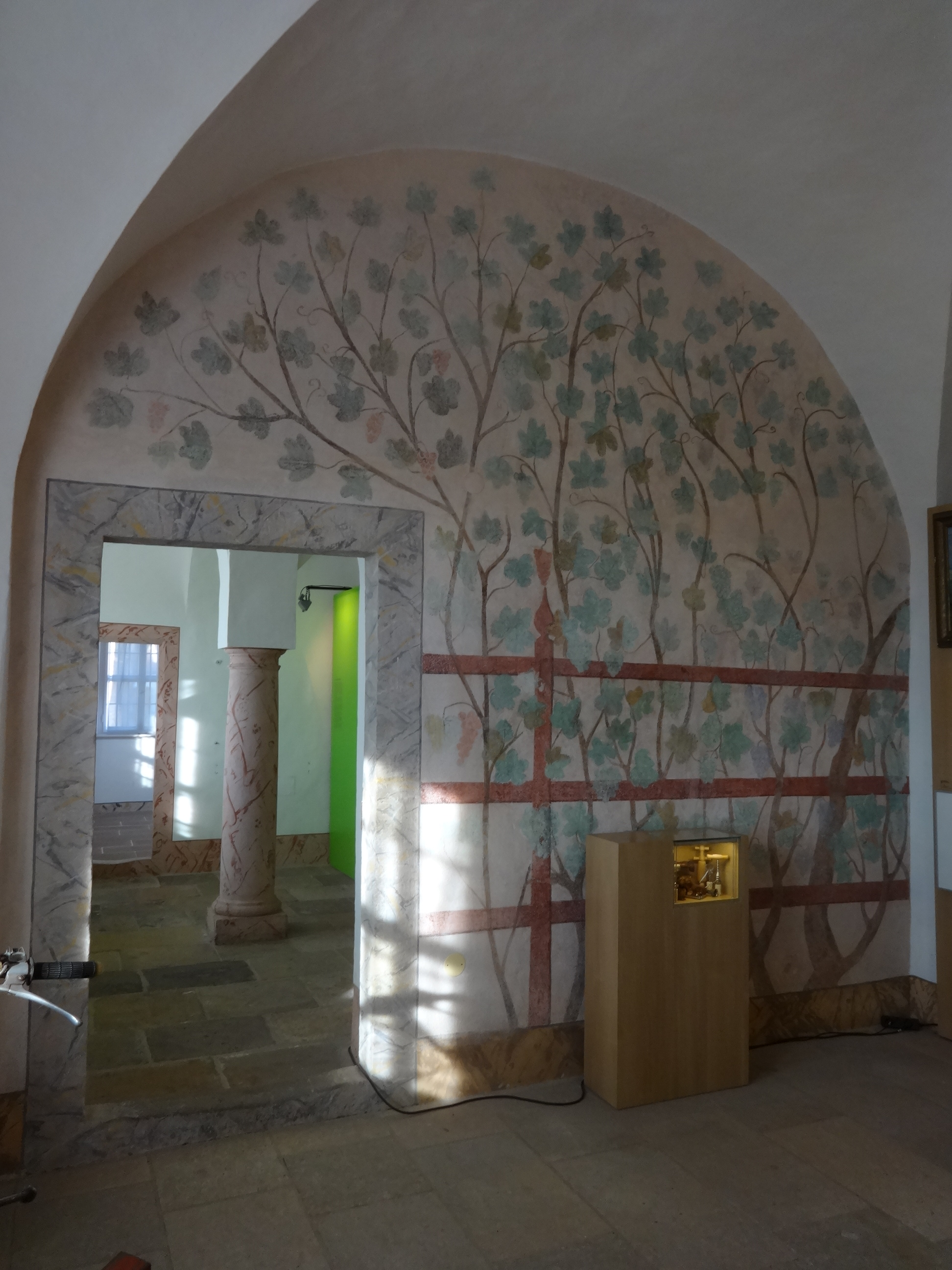
Exhibition room

=== Hoflößnitz as current municipal institution ===
The current municipal institution is carried by the Stiftung Weingutmuseum Hoflössnitz, in which, in addition to the city as the main founder, the Förderverein Kulturlandschaft Hoflößnitz founded in 1992 is a civic co-founder. The foundation worked in 2011 with five permanent employees. In addition to the foundation, a GmbH pursues the commercial interests of the Hoflößnitz. This Weingut und Weinstube Hoflößnitz Betriebsgesellschaft mbH had 7.5 employees in 2011 according to the participation report.

In public perception, the Hoflößnitz consists especially of the two institutions Weingut Hoflößnitz and Sächsisches Weinbaumuseum Hoflößnitz. In addition, there is the wine terrace and a guest house.

The property of the current Hoflößnitz mainly comprises the building ensemble with its historic furnishings as well as the Schlossberg located southeast. In addition, there are further leased vineyard areas.

In cooperation with the Radebeul registry office, weddings are also held in the banquet hall of the Hoflößnitz.

=== Hoflößnitz as Saxon cultural monument ===
The heritage Sachgesamtheit of the Hoflößnitz extends far beyond the boundaries of the municipal winery: The vineyard landscape of the Hoflößnitz as a heritage-protected work of landscape and garden design also includes several steep-slope vineyards in the north, of which, for example, the northwest Goldener Wagen as a state vineyard belongs to Schloss Wackerbarth. The Spitzhaustreppe leads through the northern steep slopes, connecting the historic outbuilding high on the slope edge, the Spitzhaus, with the estate courtyard. Southwest and below the actual Hoflößnitz, connected with another staircase, stand a vintner's house with bakehouse and the former wood yard.

== History of the winery ==
=== Founding date ===
The founding of the Hoflößnitz has been dated to May 8, 1401 since 1904, after an article by the archivist and historian Hans Beschorner in the Dresdner Geschichtsblätter,

Beschorner referred to the original document No. 5170 in the Saxon Main State Archive and claimed: According to this purchase contract between Margrave Wilhelm and Friedemann Küchenmeister, the margrave acquired during the Dohna Feud from their vassals, the Küch(en)meisters, bypassing the feudal lordship, the press house with three surrounding vineyards for a purchase sum of 1660 shock Meißner Groschen (corresponding to 4980 Rhenish guilders).

Beschorner's chain of argument that the Küchenmeisters were fief holders of the Burgraves of Dohna and that these had overlordship over some vineyards in the cadastral area of Kötzschenbroda was rejected by the historian Mike Huth in 2001 in 600 Jahre Hoflößnitz. The document No. 635 from around 1373 from the document book of the Meissen Diocese cited by Beschorner for his conclusion does prove the fief bearing of the Dohna under the Bishop of Meissen. However, the 1401 document does not prove the overlordship over the vineyards in question, which were listed as accessories.

Rather, according to the 1401 document, Margrave Wilhelm bought from Friedemann Küchenmeister for a purchase sum of 1660 shock Meißner Groschen “the village Kötzschenbroda with fields, meadows, services, duties, vineyards, spiritual and secular fiefs and all its accessories in field and village,” which thus later belonged to the Amt Dresden. Furthermore, Huth doubts that the three vineyards of the later Hoflößnitz mentioned could have been part of this purchase contract, as these lay east of the Lößnitzbach on Serkowitz cadastral land, while the 1401 purchase contract refers to Kötzschenbroda cadastral land on the west side of the Lößnitzbach. Also the Lezenitzberg mentioned in connection with the ownership of the later Haus Reinhardtsberg as the namesake of the Lößnitz lies in the western part of the Lößnitz on former Kötzschenbroda cadastral land, today Niederlößnitz.

The feudal lordship of the Meissen Margrave on the west side of the Lößnitzgrund, thus the so-called Kötzschbergisches Weingebirge, is documented in 1409.

Beschorner claims that in 1401 the three “press parts” with the wine press were already present, which Huth disputes due to the lack of sources from that time. According to him, “three press parts” of the Hoflößnitz are first mentioned in a report from 1548, namely the “Upper, Middle and Lower Lesenitz” as well as additionally the “Sandleitte in the Lesenitz”, which later was part of Neufriedstein, thus lay in Niederlößnitz, former Kötzschenbroda cadastral land. In contrast, the “Kurberge der Ober, Mittel und Nieder Leßnitz” belonged to the Serkowitz cadastral land.

Huth draws the conclusion that the date of May 8, 1401 does mean the beginning of Wettin ownership of vineyards in one of the Lößnitzortschaften, but it cannot be documented that this also includes the press house with the three nearby vineyards of the later Hoflößnitz.

=== Wettin court winery ===
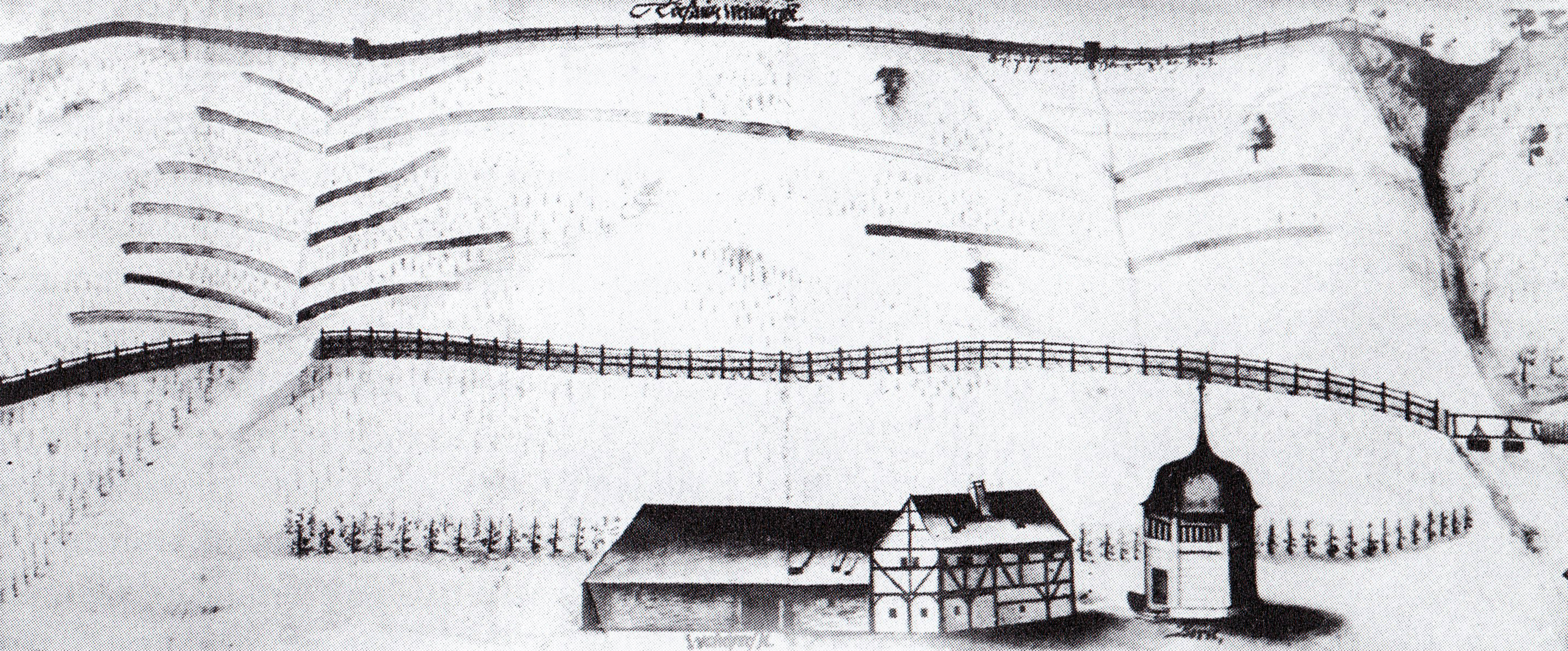
Hoflößnitz around 1620, drawing by the wine master Nicolaus Hofmeister (still before the construction of the Mountain and Pleasure House)

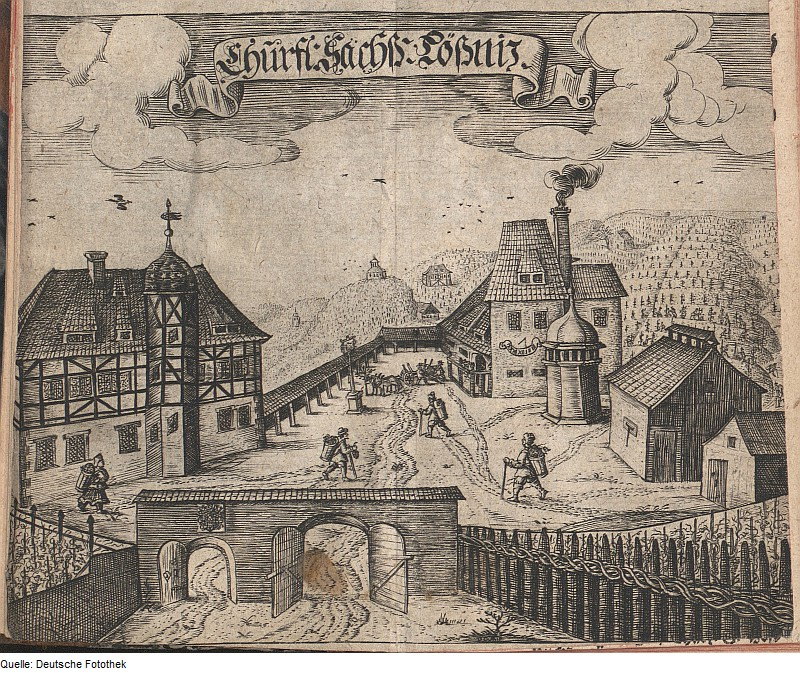
View of vineyards in the Lößnitz with winery. Johann Paul Knohll: Klein Vinicultur-Büchlein. Frontispiece, 1667. (The spiral staircase still in half-timbering)

From 1401, the Wettins brought scattered vineyard ownership in the Lößnitz under their control for almost five centuries (until 1889) and concentrated courtly viticulture on this estate. The current name “Hoflößnitz” is first mentioned in a document dated January 14, 1622. In that 17th century, the Hoflößnitz lay in the center of 6000 hectares of Saxon viticulture area.

The core of the complex was for a long time the press house described in 1563, which was equipped with a large tree press, and until 1688 owned the only wine cellar. Elector Christian I. issued the first regulations for Saxon viticulture in 1588, the Weingebürgsordnung.

In the 17th century, a residential extension was added to the existing press house for the mountain administrator. From 1616, specialists from Württemberg around the vintner Jacob Löffler introduced new cultivation and working methods “in Württemberg style”. These included terracing the steep slopes with dry stone walls, row planting of the vines as well as varietal pure cultivation. Until then, cultivation had been in mixed set, which after pressing produced the typical Rotling (Schieler). From 1615 to 1735, the electoral ownership increased enormously through purchases of further vineyards. Until into the 19th century, the mountain administrator was responsible for twelve vintneries (1670: with 23 vineyards) with their mountain bailiffs. Two of them lay on the cadastral land of today's Niederlößnitz: these were the Eckberg and a vineyard north of the Spittelberg. The mountain administrator of the Hoflößnitz was directly subordinate to the electoral Landweinmeister. Ecclesiastically, the courtly domain was assigned to the Kirche zu Kötzschenbroda.

For the water supply of the estate courtyard, the Straken water pipeline, a wooden pipeline, was put into operation in 1625 from the Wahnsdorf height. Fed by Wahnsdorf springs, this first ran south through the incised Straken ground and then west parallel to Weinbergstraße. Against water rent, it initially supplied twelve properties. The Hof-Lößnitzer Röhr-Waßer-Ordnung regulated the use legally from 1744. A polygonal water house with curved hood in the inner courtyard of the complex collected the pipeline water (in the 1667 image in front of the smoking chimney of the right upper mountain administrator house). In addition, a sundial was set up on a column in the inner courtyard.

In the years 1648 to 1650, Elector Johann Georg I. built a small palace on the estate with the help of his land architect Ezechiel Eckhardt, which can be assigned to the transition from late Renaissance to early Baroque and whose interior furnishings stylistically belong to Mannerism. It differed externally from the Lößnitz vineyard houses by the tower with the spiral staircase as well as the gilded weather vane with the Saxon coat of arms. The interior construction was probably not completed until around 1680. The Elector's son Johann Georg II. celebrated the grape harvest there annually, employed the Dutchman Albert Eckhout already hired by his father as court painter and arranged larger expansions in interior architecture as well as additions. Especially also through the court painters Wiebel and Schiebling, the splendid furnishings of the banquet hall with the two laterally located living and sleeping rooms of the Elector and Electress were created. Also around 1650, the kitchen and stable building was created, which today looks out on both sides from the later expanded cavalier house.

From 1657 to 1807, the Lößnitzer Manual was kept, which recorded the electoral visits to the Hoflößnitz: Johann Georg II. was on site up to five times a year, mostly on the way to the hunt in the Friedewald.

From 1661, Johann Paul Knohll was the construction and mountain scribe at the Hoflößnitz, who wrote with his Klein Vinicultur-Büchlein a standard work on Saxon viticulture used into the 19th century. After 1667, the originally half-timbered spiral tower up to the top was rebuilt into a massive spiral stone. The buildings west of the small palace with wine cellar, cellar room, vintner dwelling and stable were created in 1688. In place of today's cavalier house stood the kitchen building. Parts of it remained in 1843 during the construction of the later mountain administrator house.

Augustus the Strong invited his hunting parties to Hoflößnitz and held court dance festivals with wine dispensing. The first such festival for the grape harvest took place in 1715, followed by others in 1719 and 1727. After the Spitzige Haus on the height above the Hoflößnitz had come back into electoral possession in 1710 through the Countess Cosel, August harbored first plans for another pleasure palace on the height; of this, only the shell pavilion was executed. Instead, his son Friedrich August II. had the Spitzige Haus baroquely rebuilt in 1749 according to plans by Matthäus Daniel Pöppelmann using the older building substance. A year staircase with planned 365 (in reality 390) steps led from the small palace to the height (restoration 1845–1847, renovated 1992 with 397 steps).

In the 17th or 18th century, the electoral vintners planted a vine Frühe Leipziger (Prié Blanc) on a south wall in the vineyard Goldener Wagen, which today with an estimated age of 250 to 350 years is considered the fourth oldest vine in the world and second oldest house vine in Germany.

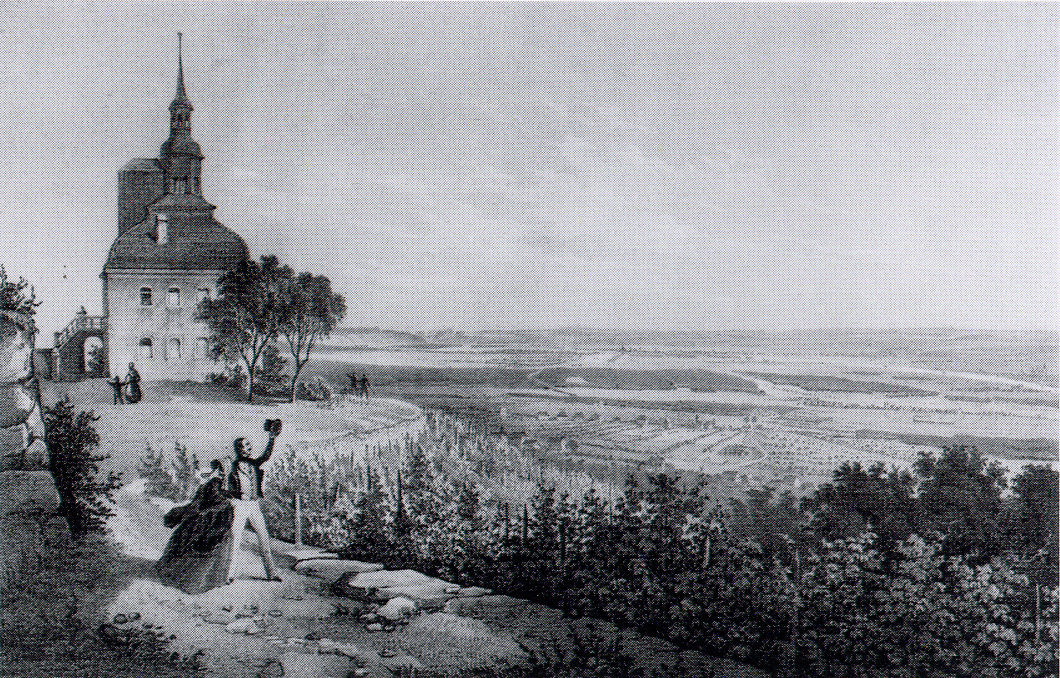
Spitzhaus from the west side with view to Dresden, bottom right lies the Hoflößnitz (etching early 19th century)

The press house was renewed in 1698. Burned down in 1824, it was rebuilt including the dwelling for the mountain bailiff by the land architect Carl Mildreich Barth.

Both the Electors and later the Saxon kings used their country seat in the Lößnitz also for state-relevant meetings. The guest book preserved in the Saxon State Archive for the private chambers in the tower floor of the Spitzhaus standing high on the slope edge names names like Emperor Joseph II, King Charles X of France and King Otto I of Greece. Also the later German Emperor William I of Prussia was a guest there as Crown Prince.

=== Saxon state winery, phylloxera catastrophe ===
In 1834, the royal winery was converted into a state winery. Land architect Carl Mildreich Barth created the plans in 1843 for the late classicist construction of the mountain administrator house, which integrated parts of the kitchen and stable buildings. The execution was by Karl Moritz Haenel. For this building, the ahistorical but still used designation cavalier house became established at the beginning of the 20th century.

The construction of the first German long-distance railway connection Leipzig–Dresden built from 1837 to 1839 was started simultaneously from both sides. The 8.18 km long section from Dresden-Neustadt to Weintraube was ceremonially opened on July 19, 1838, at the same time near the Hoflößnitz at the height of today's stop Radebeul-Weintraube the first stop “zur Weintraube” on today's Radebeul city area was inaugurated, including the first turntable after the Leipziger Bahnhof in Dresden. By the end of August of that year, 68,000 passengers had already used the “steam ride” to the Lößnitz.

On October 25, 1840, a large bourgeois vintners' festival with the vintners' procession of the viticulture society took place, which led from the Hoflößnitz to the Gasthof Goldene Weintraube. At the festival, not only a banquet and dance were offered, but also a Bengal fire on the mountain heights of the Hoflößnitz and at Cossebaude on the other side of the Elbe. This vintners' procession is probably the best known in Saxony today, as it was recorded and published by the painter Moritz Retzsch living in Oberlößnitz on his winery Retzschgut in a series of images. Retzsch's image template influenced all subsequent processions. A version of Retzsch's image sequence colored in the 1950s is exhibited in the winegrowing museum. It provided the model for the vintners' processions from 2011.

From 1846 to 1851, compensation recess negotiations took place between the special commission for compensation and commons division and twelve named “property owners obligated to deliver interest manure to the domain cellar [of the Hoflößnitz] in Naundorf and Zitzschewig”, six farm owners from each place. The goal was to convert the natural interest of annually 42 fuder of manure to be delivered without compensation since at least 1170 into a monetary rent payment to the state treasury. Also in 1846, it was determined that the 200 grape harvest days to be performed annually in the Hoflößnitz by residents of Kötzschenbroda, Fürstenhains, Serkowitz’, Radebeuls, Micktens, Übigaus, Trachaus, Reichenbergs, Dippelsdorfs, Naundorfs and Zitzschewigs were to be compensated by a one-time amount as well as annual rent payments to the treasury of the Dresden Rentamt. The respective one-time amounts and annual payments were based on the respective share ratios per commune.

According to Hofmann 1853 the Hoflößnitz as “special immediate Dresden office place” had a size of 80 bushel seed, which corresponds to about 22 hectares. Together with the office vineyards in Pillnitz and Cossebaude, they were subordinate to a royal office mountain inspector.

In the 1880s, the phylloxera catastrophe in the Lößnitz caused severe damage to the vineyards. In the summer of 1887, the infestation of the soils was officially determined, after which, according to a Reich law of 1875, the destruction of the vine systems had to follow. In May 1888, the Saxon government decided to abandon viticulture in the Hoflößnitz as well as the sale of the fiscal vineyards.

=== Sale of the vineyards and estate complex to private ===
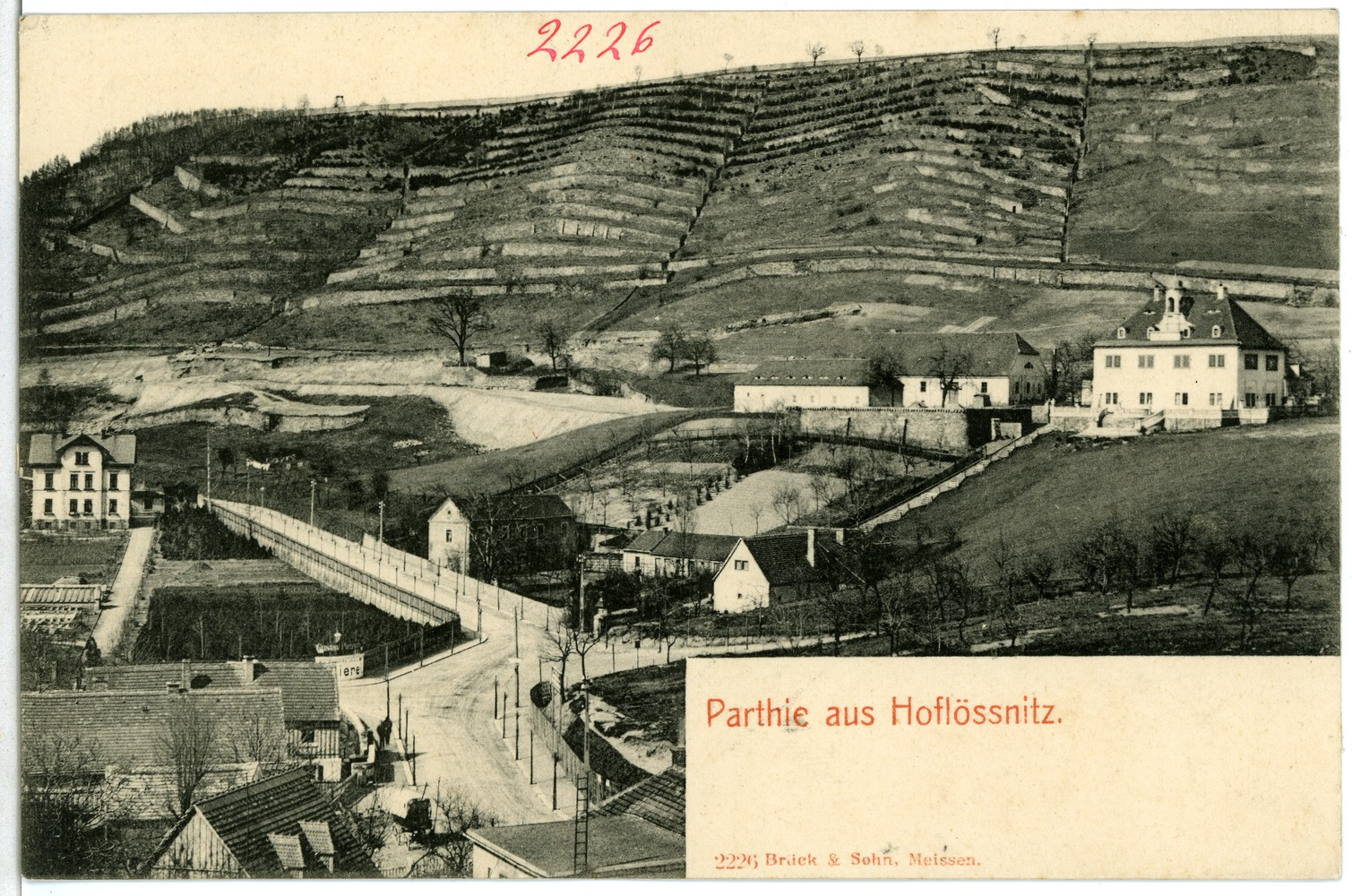
Hoflößnitz, 1901. Left of the main house the press house and the farm building, top left at the stairs the bastion-like substructure, on which the chestnut terrace is today. Bottom at the stairs right the vintner's house and left the wood yard. In the background the abandoned vineyards.

In 1889, the winery was parceled and auctioned, as were many parts of the movable inventory. Many of the former vineyard areas were subsequently built with villas. The estate complex itself came after two owner changes in 1899 into the hands of the Russian general and envoy to the Saxon court, Count Boris Sukanov-Podkolzin (also Suckanoff-Podkolzine). He had a very large dimensioned, paneled neo-rococo tower structure set on the Mountain and Pleasure House south toward the valley. And in front of the main house, toward the valley, a balustrade with a free staircase was built. In addition, the courtyard gate received a neo-baroque grille.

Already in 1900 the general died, and the new owner became his heiress, the Countess Anna von Zolotoff living in Saint Petersburg. Since the small palace lying far away in Saxony meant little to her and she considered selling the property used only for occasional summer stays, the danger of further parceling of the remaining areas of the formerly extensive winery arose again. The Oberlößnitz development plan provided for villa construction all around, of which in 1905 the Villa Franziska nearby in Hoflößnitzstraße 58 was built. What could happen to the remaining area had shown the development of the Villenkolonie Altfriedstein, including the intervention in the centuries-old building substance of a manor house.

=== Saviors of the stock: The Hoflößnitz Association ===
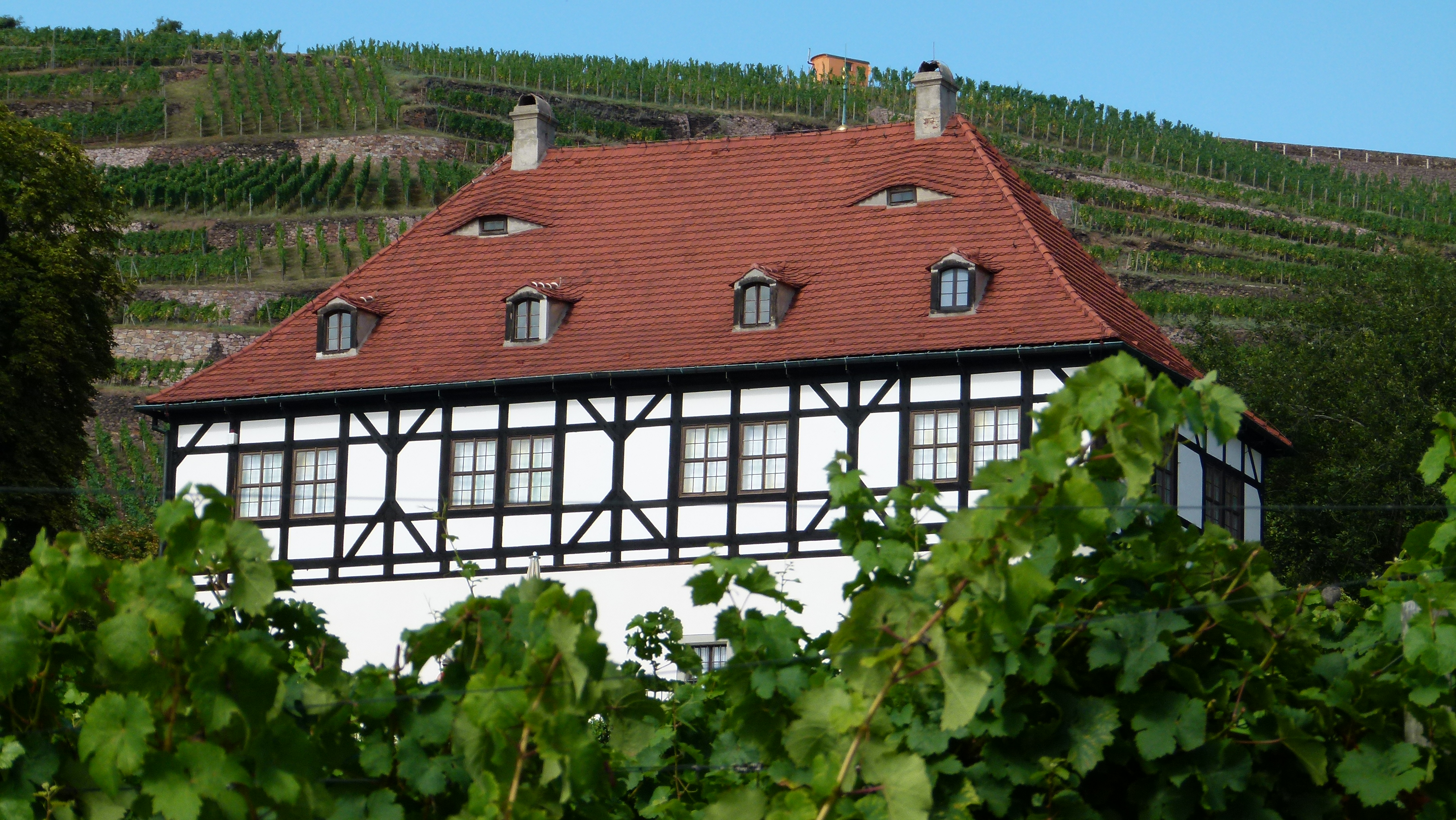
For comparison: Pleasure and Mountain House today

In 1912, the core of the Hoflößnitz, a 2.8 hectare property with the winery complex, was again for sale.

To counteract the further fragmentation of the remaining areas with the consequence of further sprawl as well as the dispersal of still existing artworks, interested citizens founded the Hoflößnitz Association. On March 20, 1912, the association founded in the Grundschänke under the leadership of the secret finance councilor Georg Friedrich Haase from Oberlößnitz took its seat in Oberlößnitz. Lippert became deputy chairman and Beschorner secretary; also involved was the Oberlößnitz community board Bruno Hörning as treasurer. The association purpose according to the statutes was to

purchase, repair and preserve the art-historically extremely valuable, especially in its decoration unique former electoral vineyard palace Hoflößnitz with the surrounding land, and to create a museum of the history of the Lößnitz places and Saxon viticulture to be housed on the ground floor.

The association, soon grown to 120 members through the support of the historian Woldemar Lippert, board member in the Royal Saxon Antiquities Association, succeeded in a short time in raising a large part of the funds necessary for the acquisition and renovation in the amount of 350,000 marks especially through donations from the ranks of industry.

After the acquisition of the complex (the Spitzhaus could not be reacquired) as well as the eastern areas (especially the Schlossberg) in July 1912, the architectural management was transferred to the architect and board member Emil Högg, who settled in the neighboring Radebeul in the same year in his own house. His task was the securing of the centuries-old historic substance, the necessary reduction to the historic stylization as well as the then prevailing ideas of heritage-appropriate renovation. He found support for the restoration of the damaged wall and ceiling paintings with the Dresden painter Gustav Löhr.

The local history museum was commissioned to the Niederlößnitz school director Emanuel Erler. He led the local group of the Association for Saxon Folklore, with which he had already exhibited an exhibition of local viticulture history at the Kötzschenbroda trade exhibition of 1909. Especially also because of the encouragement by King Friedrich August III., Erler wanted to make this exhibition a permanent presentation.

The building technical investigations had revealed that the vineyard palace was much more dilapidated than suspected. Through the improper placement of the oversized roof rider on the south side, the roof structure was so deformed that intruded rainwater had damaged the ceiling paintings of the banquet hall. In addition, the half-timbering in the upper floor, probably plastered in the 18th century, was severely damaged. Högg's measures such as the removal of the roof tower, the exposure of the half-timbering and the replacement of beams saved the building and at the same time put it externally into a form appropriate to the construction time of 1650. In addition, the balustrade was broken off again and the neo-baroque gate was removed. All these construction executions were in the hands of the construction company Hörnig & Barth. The historically appropriate restoration was so elaborate that it consumed the association's assets. In addition, the external appearance provoked protests in the population, who did not imagine a small palace like a simple vintner's house. The donation sources dried up in a short time.

In 1913, the Association for the Promotion of Viticulture in the Lößnitz was founded, which under the leadership of the oenologist Carl Pfeiffer began to replant the Lößnitz with the grafted vine introduced in 1905.

Costly wrong decisions by Haase cost him his place, he was forced to resign. A tax demand in 1914 led to de facto insolvency. After some association board members were drafted for war service at the beginning of the First World War, the Oberlößnitz community leader and association treasurer Hörnig took care of the association's business. The debt burden led three years after founding to the orderly bankruptcy proceedings of the association. To secure what had been achieved, Hörnig initiated the bankruptcy proceedings over the association in February 1915; in June 1915, Oberlößnitz as the main creditor acquired the now repaired and increased in value Hoflößnitz property for significantly less money than the association had paid.

The Hoflößnitz Association thus became the “savior of the Hoflößnitz”, its bankruptcy, “a blemish in the eyes of contemporaries, appears from the distance of a century as a marginal note.”

=== Municipal ownership: Local heritage protection law and beginning of the recultivation of viticulture ===
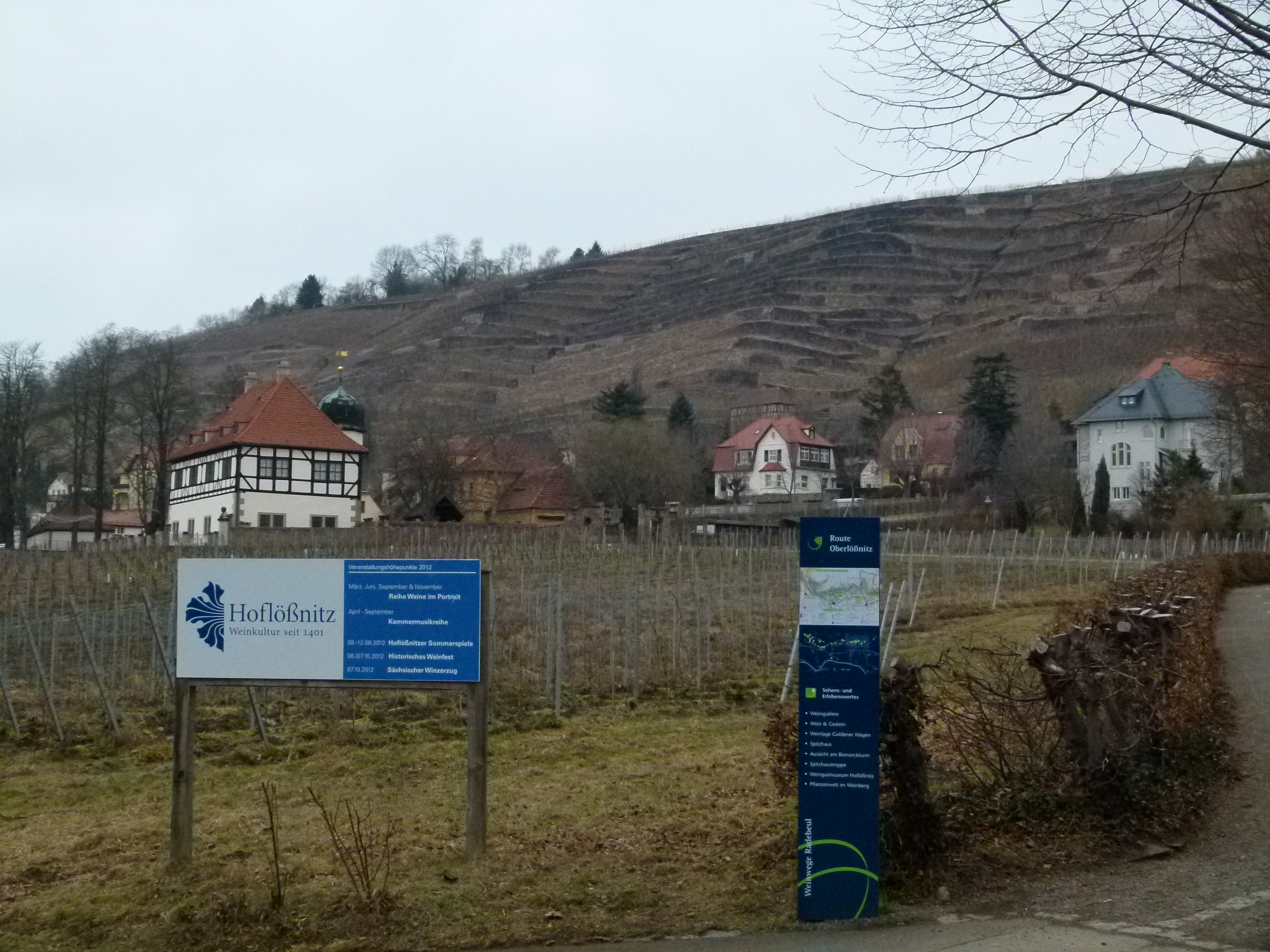
Schlossberg and Hoflößnitz, villa development on Hoflößnitzstraße (right)

Upon takeover, the commune received the state requirement to maintain the property in a heritage-appropriate manner and to prevent future land speculation with the Hoflößnitz property. Thus, Oberlößnitz issued in the same year 1915 a local law against the disfigurement of the Hoflößnitz including systems and surroundings, to protect the further division of the core areas of the former royal winery Hoflößnitz against urban sprawl. The basis was the Saxon Gesetz gegen Verunstaltung von Stadt und Land of 1909.

In 1916, Carl Pfeiffer took over the management of the vine refinement station located at the Hoflößnitz, from which after takeover by the state cultivation council in 1927 the free state Winegrowing Experimental and Teaching Institute emerged. Pfeiffer also campaigned for increasing the quality of Lößnitz wine and introduced mineral reserve fertilization. The Saxon Ministry of Economic Affairs built an administrative seat of the institute in 1927 at the foot of the Spitzhaus staircase, in which the state vintner school was also operated.

In the so-called “electoral chamber” at the west end of the farm building (vintner's house), a restaurant was opened in 1919, which was operated until 1938.

The construction measures interrupted by the First World War were resumed after the war. The architect Emil Högg already planned in February 1913 to convert the west part of the vintner and stable building pointing north into a two-story residential house; the building permit for this could only be submitted in 1920. The construction management of the execution was by Ferdinand Severitt, who carried it out as part of the then possible emergency works. For this, the old building body was demolished, whereby old cellar rooms came to light. On these, the new residential house with two apartments was built in a restrained modern building style of the turn of the century, carried “by the spirit of consideration for the historically given”, with a set-back upper floor, whose ridge line runs in continuation of the ridge of the left adjoining old building. The transverse division of the new building was done via a band-like, narrow roof surface between the floors, which starts from the window sill of the upper floor windows. In addition, all windows were framed by one-sided simple shutters.

The cavalier house was only changed externally by breaking in a door on the back. The floor plans also remained largely the same. However, the attic was developed for residential purposes, for which two new dormers were inserted into the roof skin. These works were also managed by the master builder Severitt, Högg's plans for them dated from 1921. All conversions for residential purposes were carried out with the aim of generating permanent rental income for the Hoflößnitz through renting living space.

The commune Oberlößnitz set up a local history and Lößnitz museum in the small palace at Pentecost 1924 (Heimathaus Hoflößnitz); it was supported by the first Saxon state conservator Walter Bachmann, who had moved to the Lößnitz in 1919. At Pentecost 1924, the youth hostel Oberlößnitz opened a bed domicile with 40 sleeping places in the attic of the small palace. The youth hostel was allowed to use the attic until 1935, when the city winery was created.

=== City winery Radebeul ===
After the incorporation of Wahnsdorf and Oberlößnitz in 1934, the city of Radebeul was owner of Lößnitz vineyards. The then mayor Heinrich Severit set up the city winery Radebeul in 1935, whose seat was set up in the traditional, former royal winery property Hoflößnitz. As part of the then possible emergency works, Severit recruited labor in 1936 for the recultivation and replanting of the vineyards cleared due to the phylloxera catastrophe. The city vintner Ludwig Gleich used in the first years especially workers of the Reichsarbeitsdienst. After the acquisition of the Goldener Wagen the first harvest took place there in October 1938, 50 years after the clearing of the then chamber vineyards.

In 1938, the Saxon Winegrowing Cooperative was founded in the Hoflößnitz.

The new plantings were made with grafted vines mainly of the varieties Müller-Thurgau, Riesling, Ruländer, Veltliner, Silvaner, Neuburger, Traminer, Gutedel, Pinot noir or Portugieser. The land ownership of the city winery was over 16 hectares in 1941; the agricultural areas were mainly cultivated during the Second World War by forced laborers.

In the meantime, the Hoflößnitz was used in the Second World War as a prisoner of war camp for soldiers of the Red Army. After the war, which the Hoflößnitz survived unscathed, it became the seat of the Soviet occupation power (1st Guards Tank Army), for which a today heritage-protected block station was built in 1949 at the foot of the southwestern gate.

In 1946, the managed vineyards yielded 9.46 hectares of vine area, which according to a property overview from west to east consisted of the following vineyards: Altfriedstein, Steinrücken (near the Friedrich-August-Höhe), Goldener Wagen, Schlossberg (house mountain of the Hoflößnitz), Perle, Hölle, Ballberg, Hermannsberg, Albertsberg and Ravensberg. The yield was temporarily confiscated by the Soviet Military Administration in Germany. Plans in 1946 to set up a hotel in the cavalier house were not implemented.

In 1947, the area size of the city winery including still fallow mountains was just under 29 hectares, of which just under 3.3 hectares were leased.

On October 1, 1949, the Heimathaus Hoflößnitz with its museum building, the Mountain and Pleasure House, remained in the legal ownership of the city of Radebeul, while the rest of the city winery operation was spun off.

=== People's winery Lößnitz, viticulture Radebeul ===
The city winery Radebeul and the state winery of the state of Saxony both passed into the legal ownership of the central Vereinigung Volkseigener Güter (ZVVG) Southeast on October 1, 1949. This was subordinate to the Ministry of Agriculture and Forestry of the state of Saxony. Added were the city wineries of Dresden and Meißen as well as some expropriated operations of private vintners. From the association of both wineries emerged the People's Own Enterprise Viticulture “Lößnitz”. As the seat of the people's winery, the winery Paulsberg in the district Zitzschewig was determined, which had belonged since 1940 to the state estates administration of the Saxon state government. In addition to the viticulture “Lößnitz” only the vintners' cooperative in Meißen remained in the region as a producer operation.

The people's winery managed 39.1 hectares of agricultural land in 1952, of which 23.4 hectares were vineyard areas. Also in 1952, its first sparkling wine was produced by bottle fermentation (brand Sachsengold).

In 1954, it became the VEG(B) People's Winery, which belonged to the department of people's own enterprises of the council of the district Dresden. From 1963, it then belonged as VEG(Z) Viticulture Radebeul to the VVB Saat- und Pflanzgut Quedlinburg.

The vine areas as well as the building systems of the expropriated in 1952 Haus Barnewitz also belonged to the people's winery afterwards. From 1955, the people's winery carried out first larger new plantings.

Due to the planning of the council of the city of Radebeul from April 1958 to also produce sparkling wine in the large tank high-pressure fermentation process in the future, the people's enterprise received the property of Wackerbarths Ruhe, on which from 1967 to 1969 next to the historic palace systems a new wine and sparkling wine cellar with a bottling line was built. With the expansion planning, a sales planning increase from 3 to 11 million marks was associated. The new, partially fully automatic operating system was to enable an annual production of 4.3 million bottles of sparkling wine, whose base wines, however, did not come from own production, but were brought in from outside.

In the following period, the people's winery developed, also through the takeover of further vineyards as well as through area consolidations, into the largest viticulture operation in the Elbe Valley with about 80 hectares. Thus in 1974 six operation parts belonged to it, which managed in the Radebeul area 32.5 hectares, around Meißen 10.5 hectares (Meißner city winery), in Seußlitz (near Nünchritz) 33.5 hectares and in Cossebaude 3.5 hectares of vineyard areas. Cultivation varieties were especially Müller-Thurgau, Riesling, Pinot blanc, Traminer as well as Ruländer. According to Werte unserer Heimat a total of 136 hectares of vineyard belonged to the winery in 1970, in addition to the previous list areas in Diesbar and in the Spaargebirge are added in the listing. The vineyard areas in Diesbar-Seußlitz had been appropriated before the land reform together with the local manor and the palace as a communal economic enterprise (KWU) of the city of Dresden. Later the vineyards went to the people's winery, which carried out replantings in 1959 on flat areas between Heinrichsburg and Goldkuppe according to the Lenz-Moser-Erziehung system.

In the years 1974 to 1977, Schloss Wackerbarth and parts of the garden system were renovated. From 1977, extensive preservation work was carried out on the buildings of the Hoflößnitz, which had become rundown due to aging and improper use.

In April 1974, the people's winery took over the nearby expropriated in 1972 Sektkellerei Bussard, which was still used until 1978 for the artisanal production of sparkling wine in bottle fermentation. In 1978/1979, the traditional bottle fermentation was discontinued and the last remaining Bussard employees were transferred to mass sparkling wine production on the grounds of Wackerbarthsruhe. The tank fermentation process practiced there for mass production of cheap sparkling wine had priority over the classic bottle fermentation practiced in Bussard with much manual work, which delivered higher sparkling wine qualities but was more cost-intensive. Until 1981, the sparkling wine output increased from 25,600 to 36,500 hectoliters. The protected brands were Schlossberg (after the house mountain of the Hoflößnitz) and Schloß Wackerbarth, in 1985 the sparkling wine brand Graf Wackerbarth was introduced.

=== Municipal winery, Hoflößnitz Winery Museum Foundation, Saxon Winegrowing Museum ===
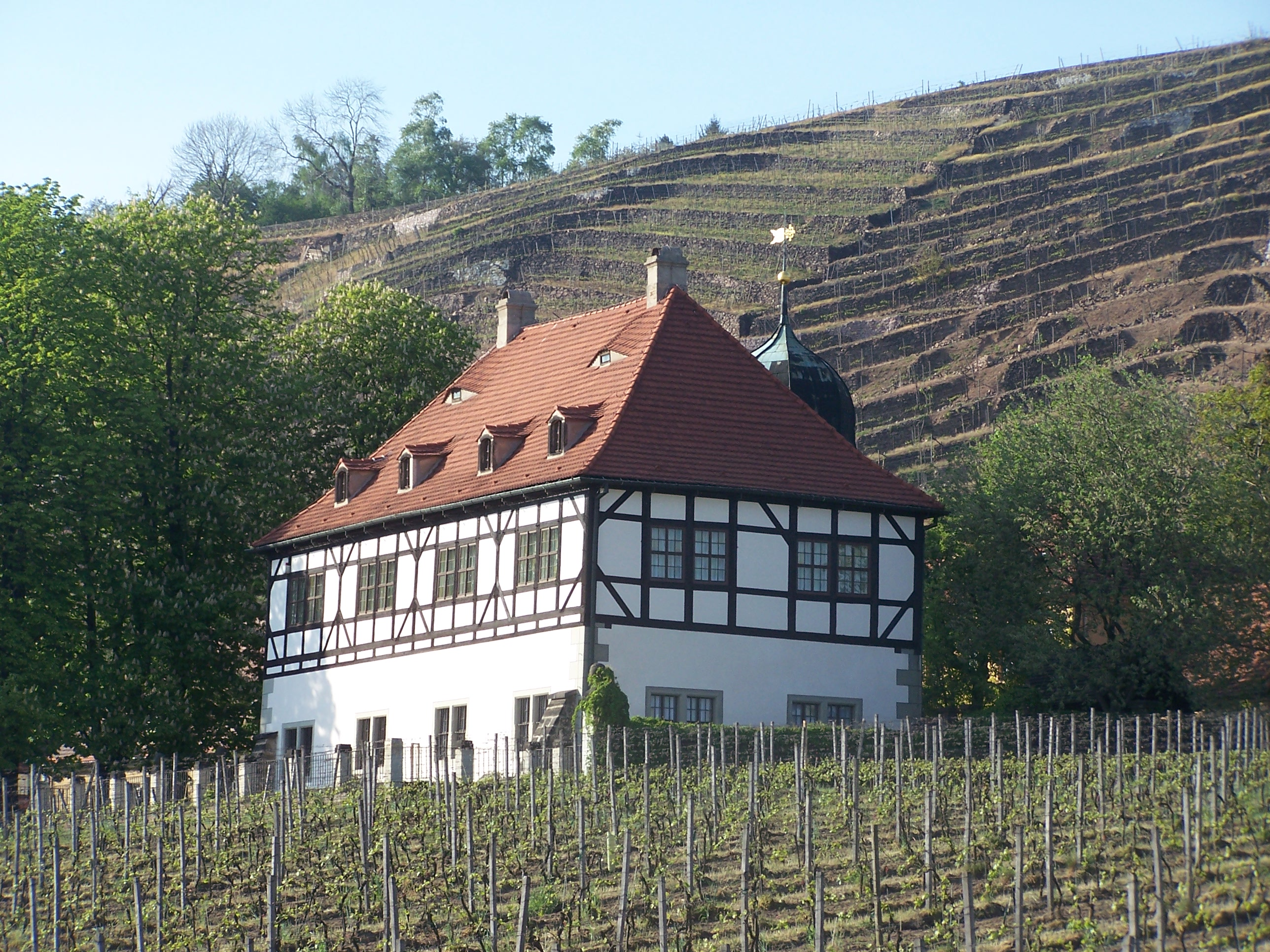
Pleasure and Mountain House with the steep slopes in the background (vineyard Goldener Wagen), in front the own Schlossberg

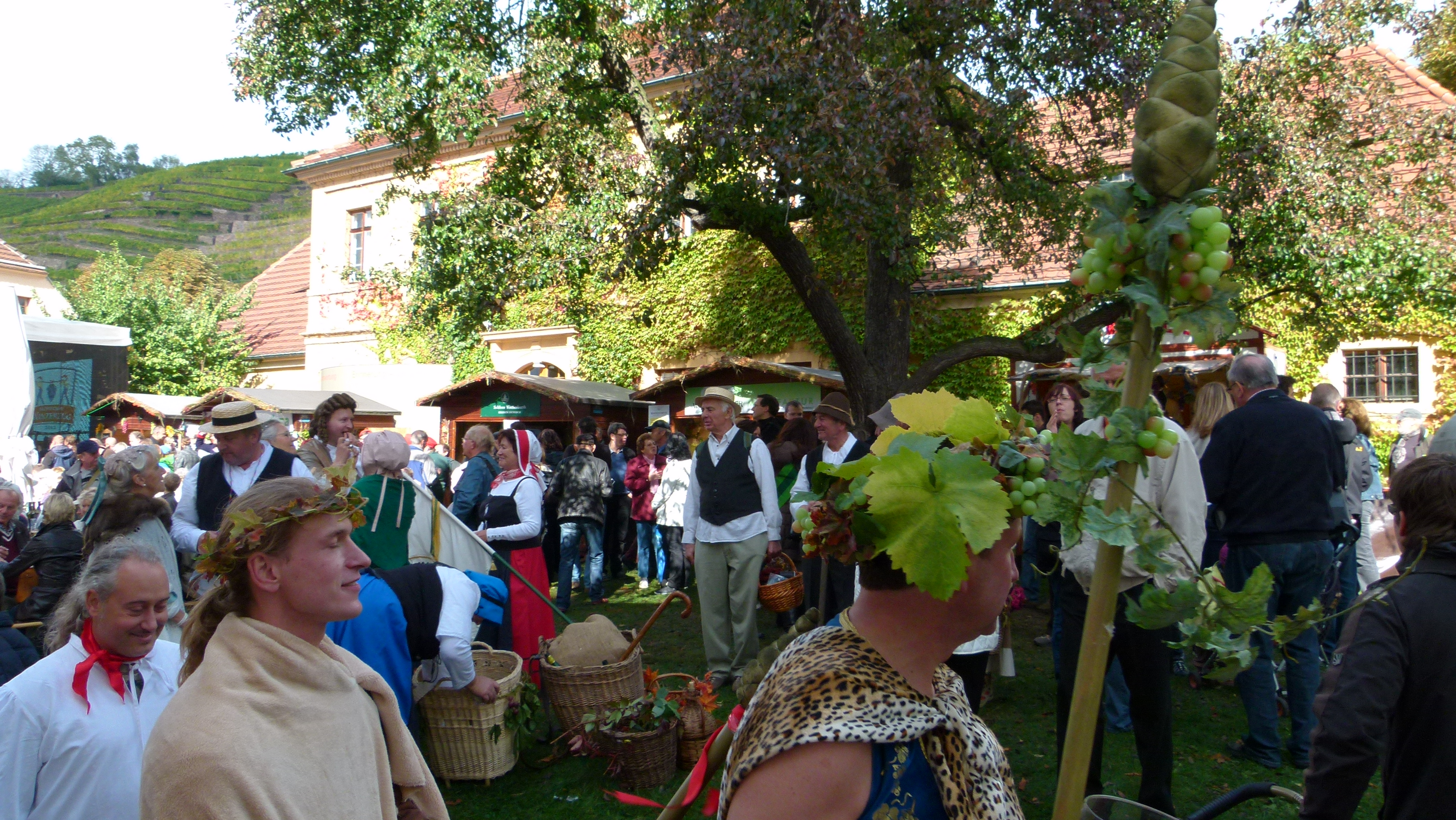
Wine festival 2012, in the audience costumed participants of the vintners' procession can be seen (in the foreground Bacchus).

In July 1990, the People's Own Enterprise was converted into Viticulture Radebeul – Schloß Wackerbarth GmbH. The state Saxony took over Schloss Wackerbarth in April 1992, while the city winery Radebeul brought into the people's winery was separated again and transferred to municipal ownership. This cleared the way for a fundamental renovation, reactivation of viticulture, revision of the museum as well as tourist use (guided tours through the small palace, museum and the winery with wine tastings, wine sales and dispensing). In 1994, a wine tavern was reopened – in the same place where one had already existed between 1919 and 1938: in the former vintner's dwelling, which was called electoral chamber at the time of the restaurant. The lower rooms of the cavalier house were restored in 1995. They have since been used for events or also wine tastings; to the right of the entrance is the museum cash desk with wine sales, to the left is a museum room, in which in 2010 the exhibition Memory + Responsibility. Saxon Viticulture in National Socialism was opened, which commemorates the forced laborers in Saxon viticulture at the time of National Socialism.

The city as owner brought the property in 1997 into a non-profit, legally capable foundation under civil law with the name Stiftung Weingutmuseum Hoflößnitz, which was approved by the Dresden government presidency in March 1998. In addition, the Weingut und Weinstube Hoflößnitz Betriebsgesellschaft mbH is operated, which bundles the commercial interests. With the conversion of the municipal museum Hoflößnitz into the winery museum Hoflößnitz, the art stock was divided: The wine-specific part remained with the Hoflößnitz, the other artworks went into the stock of the municipal art collection, which is attached to the Stadtgalerie Radebeul on the Anger of Altkötzschenbroda.

In 2001, with the publication edited by the art historian and former Saxon state conservator Heinrich Magirius 600 Years Hoflößnitz: Historic Winery Complex the probably most comprehensive standard work on the Hoflößnitz appeared.

On the occasion of the state-wide event 850 Years Viticulture in Saxony in 2011, the winery museum Hoflößnitz was upgraded to Saxon Winegrowing Museum Hoflößnitz. The museum is a member of ICOM Germany. Also in 2011, the historic vintners' procession by Moritz Retzsch from 1840 was revived by the Stiftung Weingutmuseum Hoflößnitz according to historic template; only the direction of the vintners' procession was reversed to be able to end in the Hoflößnitz. Since October 2012, the event has been repeated, in 2015 it was carried out on the occasion of the double anniversary 300 years Saxon Vintners' Procession and 25 years German Unity as German Vintners' Procession, with participation of the twelve other German winegrowing regions.

== Historic winery complex with winery and winegrowing museum ==
=== Winery ===
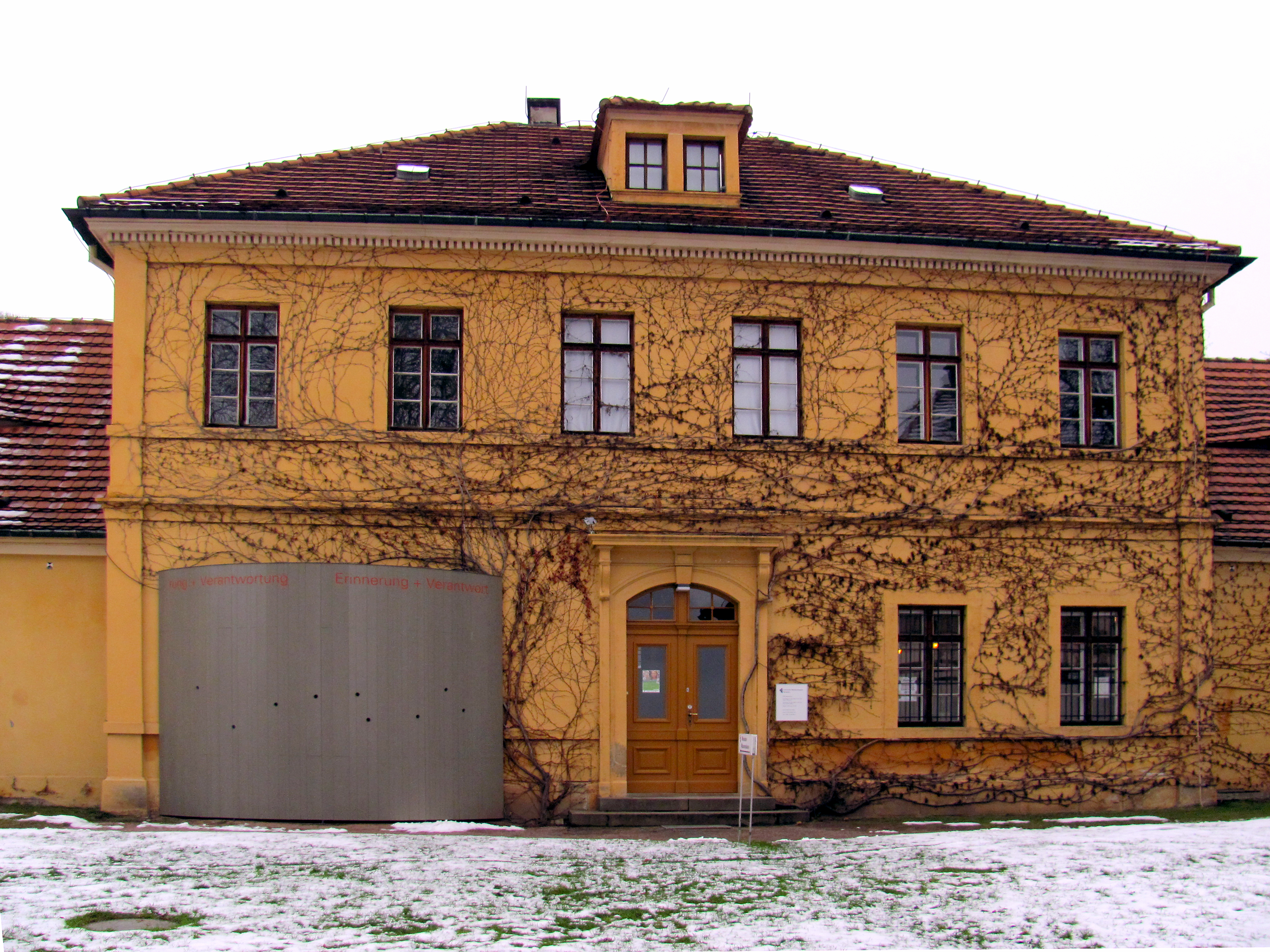
Vinothek and museum cash desk on the right side of the cavalier house, left the memory wall to the exhibition Memory + Responsibility from 2010

The winery Hoflößnitz belongs to the large site Radebeuler Lößnitz. All wines of the site Radebeuler Goldener Wagen of the current, restored after 1992 winery Hoflößnitz come from organic cultivation, as do those around the Bennoschlösschen, the only Renaissance manor house in the area. Likewise, the Paulsberg from the site Radebeuler Johannisberg and the steep-slope vineyard Friedensburg replanted since April 2008, which belongs to the Radebeuler Steinrücken and is reserved for Pinot noir, are managed by the municipal winery according to ecological aspects.

Produced on 8 hectares of vine area are wines from the classic grape varieties Riesling, Pinot blanc, Pinot noir, Pinot gris and Traminer, but also newer, fungus-resistant varieties such as Johanniter, Solaris and Regent. Also a Rotling is produced. Expanded dry or off-dry; as a rule, predicates up to Spätlese are achieved. In 2011, an average yield of 61.7 hectoliters/hectare was achieved.

In addition, the Hoflößnitz also offers wines from small vintners from the Krapenberg in Zitzschewig from the site Radebeuler Johannisberg.

In 2010, the Hoflößnitz was awarded by the German Wine Institute as Highlight of Wine Culture. Together with Schloss Wackerbarth, there are two such awards for the Saxon winegrowing region as of the end of 2012.

The only certified organically operating winery in Saxony was recommended in the Gault-Millau Wine Guide 2012/2013. At the regional wine award in the summer of 2011, wines of the 2010 vintage could win one gold, one silver and one bronze medal each, for the first time for the Hoflößnitz.

=== Saxon Winegrowing Museum ===
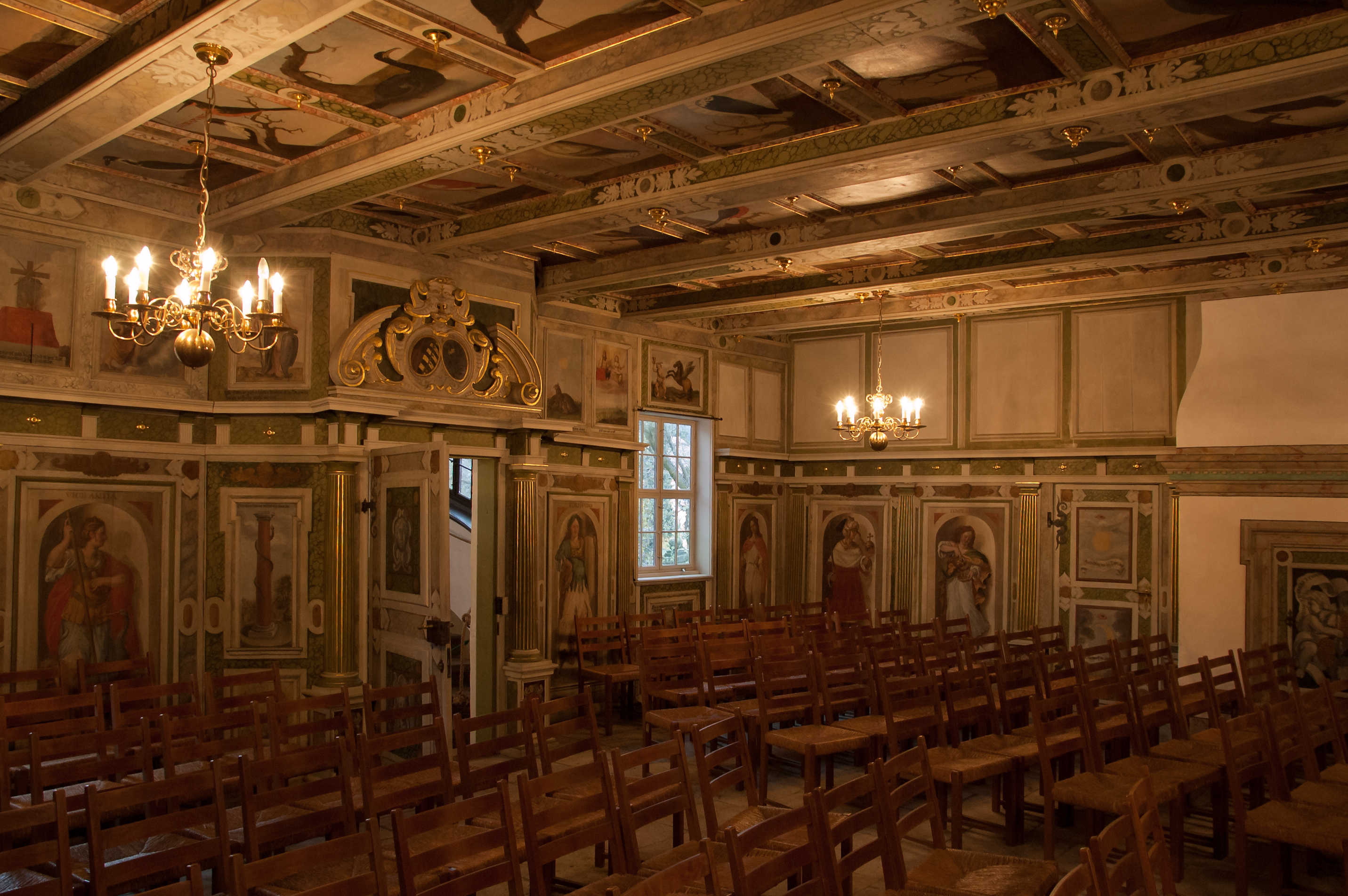
The banquet hall on the upper floor of the Pleasure and Mountain House

The local history museum in the Hoflößnitz specialized in the middle of the 1980s on local viticulture; at the end of the 1990s it became the winery museum Hoflößnitz. In 2011, the museum was upgraded to Saxon Winegrowing Museum Hoflößnitz on the occasion of the state-wide event 850 Years Viticulture in Saxony, the only winegrowing museum in Saxony. In 2012, the museum had about 24,000 visitors.

The museum presents during a tour through the ground floor of the Pleasure and Mountain House the history of viticulture in the Elbe Valley. It shows the work of the vintners in past centuries. In addition, there are utensils, documents, maps, art objects and models. The development of the former electoral or royal winery is shown and important personalities associated with viticulture are presented.

On the upper floor is the art-historical highlight of the museum, the Baroque banquet hall with its contemporary painting and imagery, including the 80 bird images by Eckhout. On both sides of the banquet hall are the living and sleeping rooms of the Elector and the Electress.

=== Vintners' tavern, guest quarters in the vintner and bakehouse ===
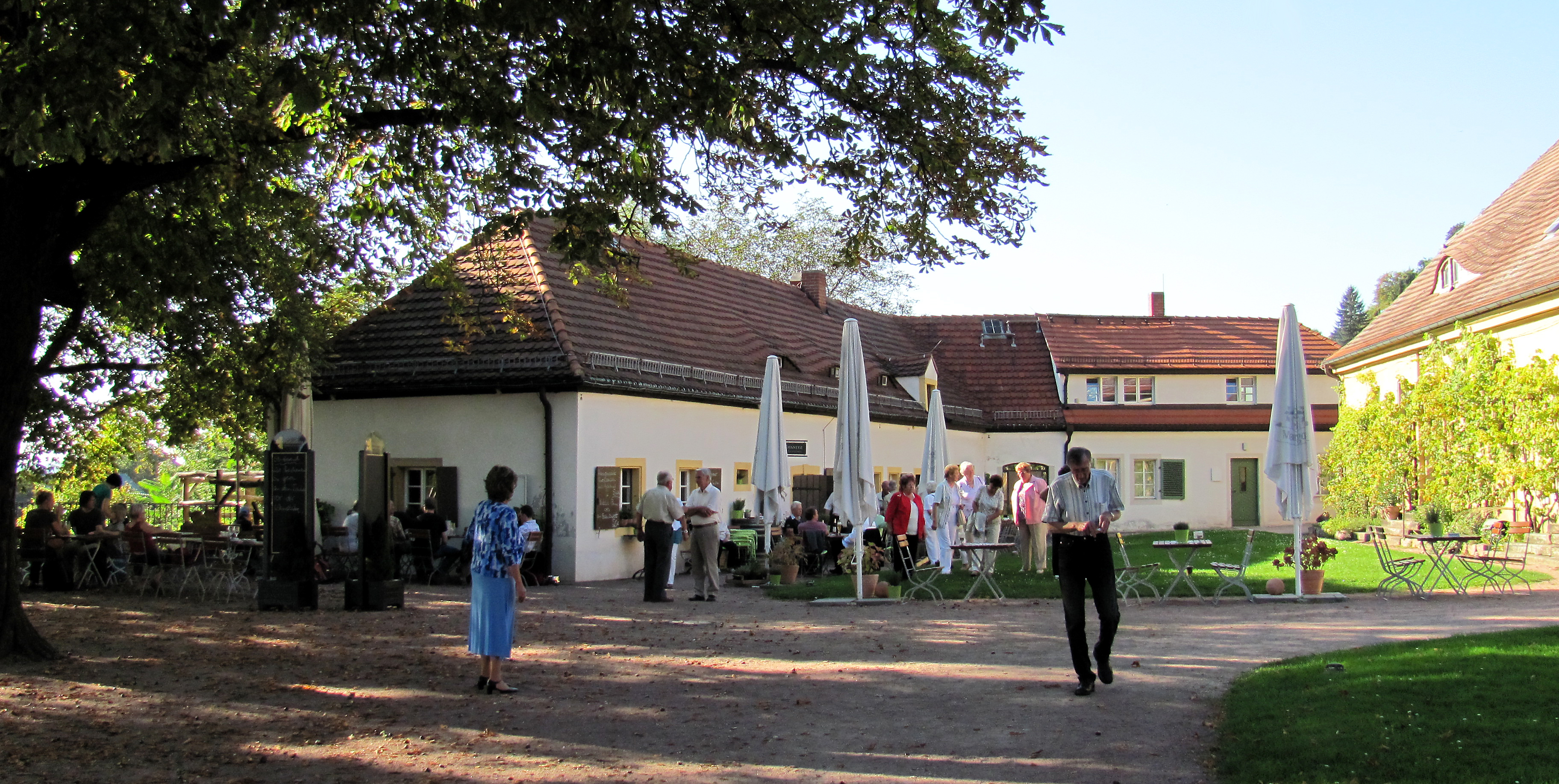
Restaurant in the farm building

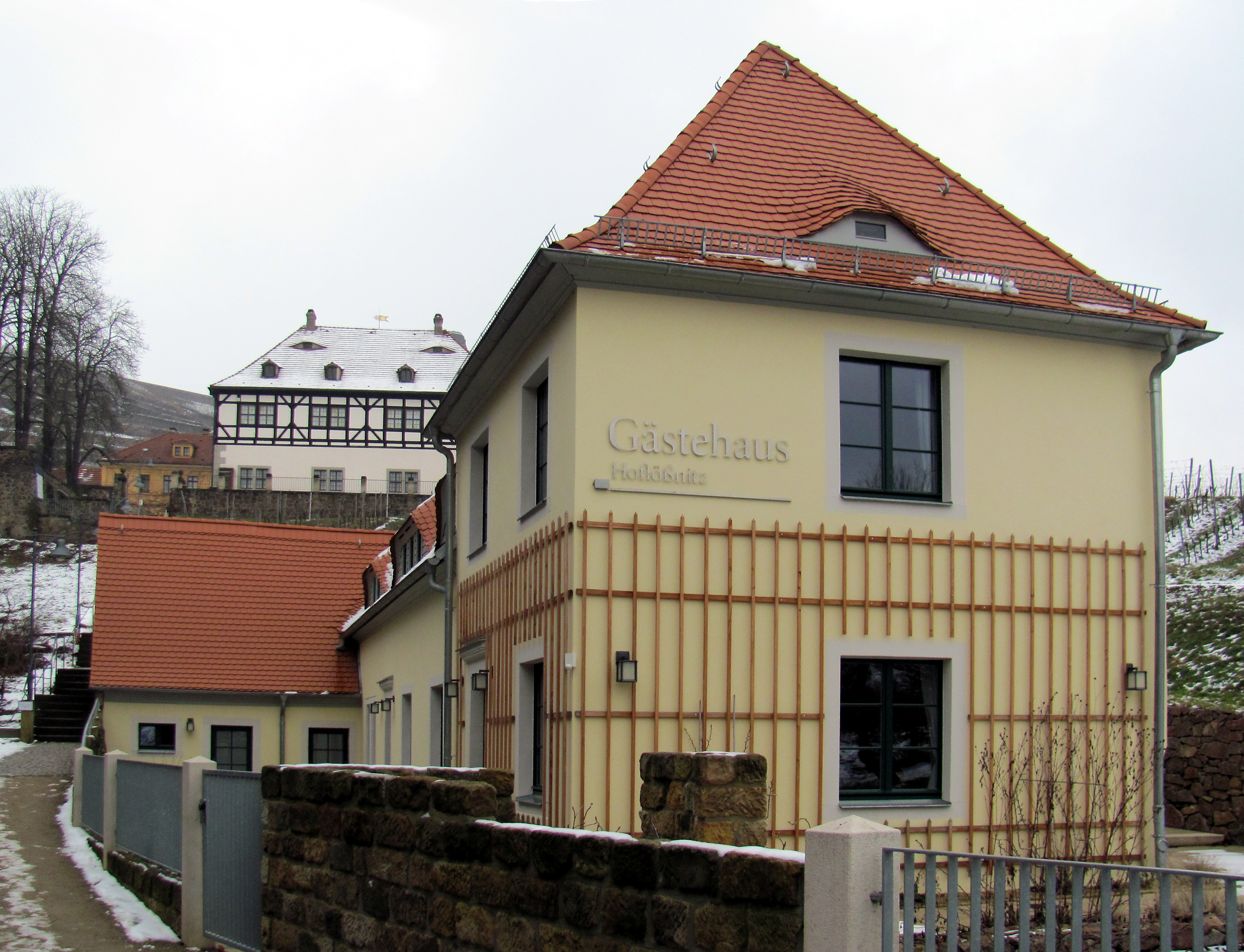
Guest quarters in the vintner and bakehouse

The former restaurant in the Hoflößnitz is located in the southwestern farm building, the cellar room or also vintners' tavern. The hospitality of the guests takes place today on the adjacent chestnut terrace with hearty tarte flambée, grilled sausages and wines from the Hof Lößnitz. The chestnut terrace offers a dreamlike view far south into the Elbe Valley.

Next to the chestnut terrace, the staircase leading up from Lößnitzgrundstraße ends, next to which at the lower entrance gate is the vintner and bakehouse. This also heritage-protected building ensemble of the Hoflößnitz was converted in 2011 into a guest house with two apartments and four double rooms.

== Cultural monument ==
The wine estate complex Hoflößnitz is listed in the Radebeul monument register particularly under the address Knohllweg 37 as "Hoflößnitz, Stiftung Weingutmuseum Hoflößnitz, mountain and pleasure house with cavalier house, former press house, farm buildings, wine press, gate systems, stairs (among others Spitzhaus Stairs with shell pavilion), rider stone and adjacent vineyards."

=== Protected ensemble, work of landscape and garden design, individual monuments ===
In the Radebeul monument topography the cultural monument Hoflößnitz is shown on the associated monument mapping of Radebeul on a scale of 1:5000 as a protected ensemble, which is completely also a work of landscape and garden design. This protected vineyard landscape lies entirely within the historic monument protection area Historic Vineyard Landscape of Radebeul. The associated vineyards are steep slopes below the Spitzhaus and the Bismarck Tower east of the Spitzhaus Stairs as well as the steep slopes below the Spitzhausweg on the west side of the Spitzhaus Stairs, which mainly belong to the Goldener Wagen. The areas of the Schlossberg located southeast of the pleasure and mountain house are rather flatter.

To the address Knohllweg 37 (formerly Hoflößnitzstraße 37, then Knohllweg 1) are added Am Goldenen Wagen (west of No. 12, the former winemaking school of the state wine estate) the gate system to and the equipment house on the vineyard Goldener Wagen, then above the slope edge under Spitzhausstraße the shell pavilion, the Bismarck Tower as well as the Spitzhaus Stairs up there and with the address Spitzhausstraße 36 the Spitzhaus itself is also still in the depicted protected ensemble. South below the manor farm lie east of the ascending stairs as Lößnitzgrundstraße 19 "winemaker's house, former bakery and gate system", to which also belongs the transformer station located outside the gate, and west of the stairs lies the property Lößnitzgrundstraße 23, the former "wood yard with winemaker's house". Not all of the properties belonging together for monument preservation purposes are owned by the Hoflößnitz Foundation.

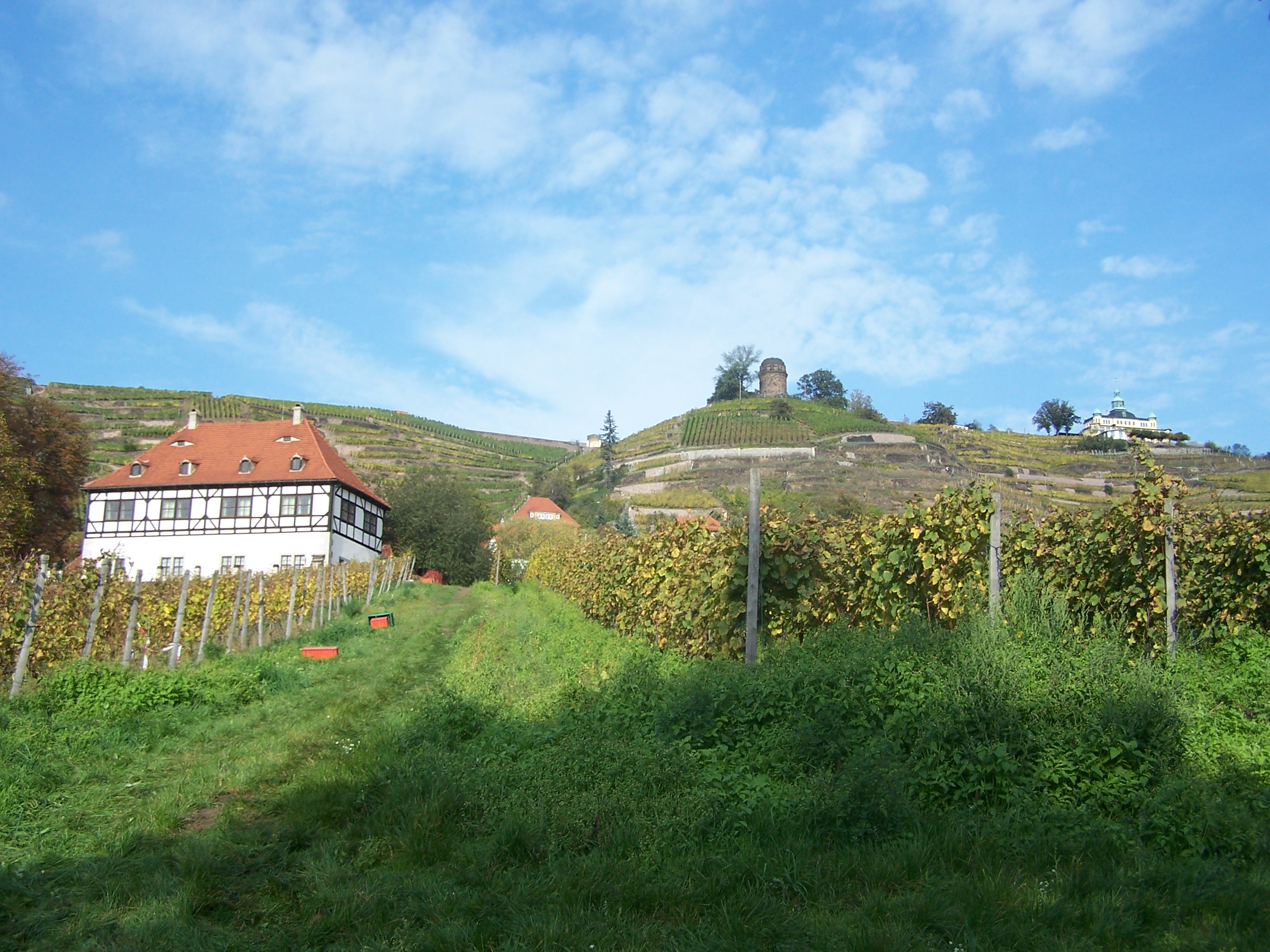
Hoflößnitz with the Spitzhaus (right above), between them Spitzhaus Stairs and Bismarck Tower

Within the protected ensemble, numerous buildings are designated as individual monuments. These are presented here in context.

=== Goldener Wagen, Spitzhaus Stairs, Shell Pavilion, Bismarck Tower, Spitzhaus ===
The approximately northward-leading baroque stairway to heaven, the Spitzhaus Stairs, is the longest staircase in Saxony. It leads over a length of 220 meters from the small palace at the vineyard Goldener Wagen past the freshly gilded keystone of the gate arch in 2012 up to the shell pavilion. From there it goes to the Bismarck Tower and to the Spitzhaus (today a panoramic restaurant with a wide view over the Elbe Valley basin). These buildings are touched by the approximately 5 kilometer long Oberlößnitz Wine Hiking Trail.

The rear property areas of the protected houses Am Goldenen Wagen 12, Am Goldenen Wagen 14 as well as the so-called Berghäus’l (Am Goldenen Wagen 16) are shown in the monument mapping of the monument topography as belonging to the protected vineyard landscape of the Hoflößnitz and thus also to the protected ensemble. This also applies to almost the entire property of the country house at Hoflößnitzstraße 72 (except the southwestern property corner on the street). In the 1920s to 1940s, the latter country house was the residence of high-ranking Saxon politicians.

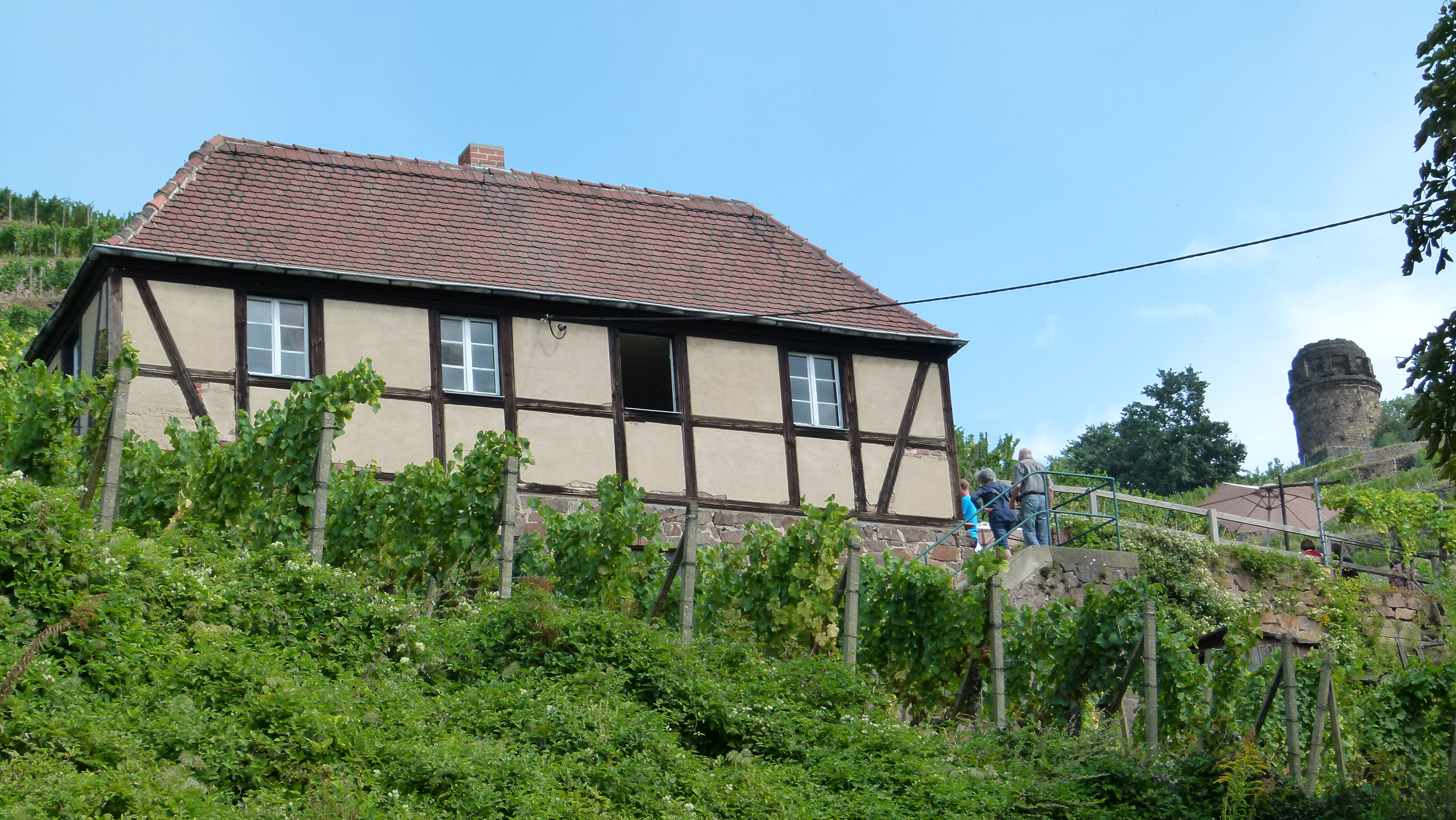
Equipment house in Goldener Wagen

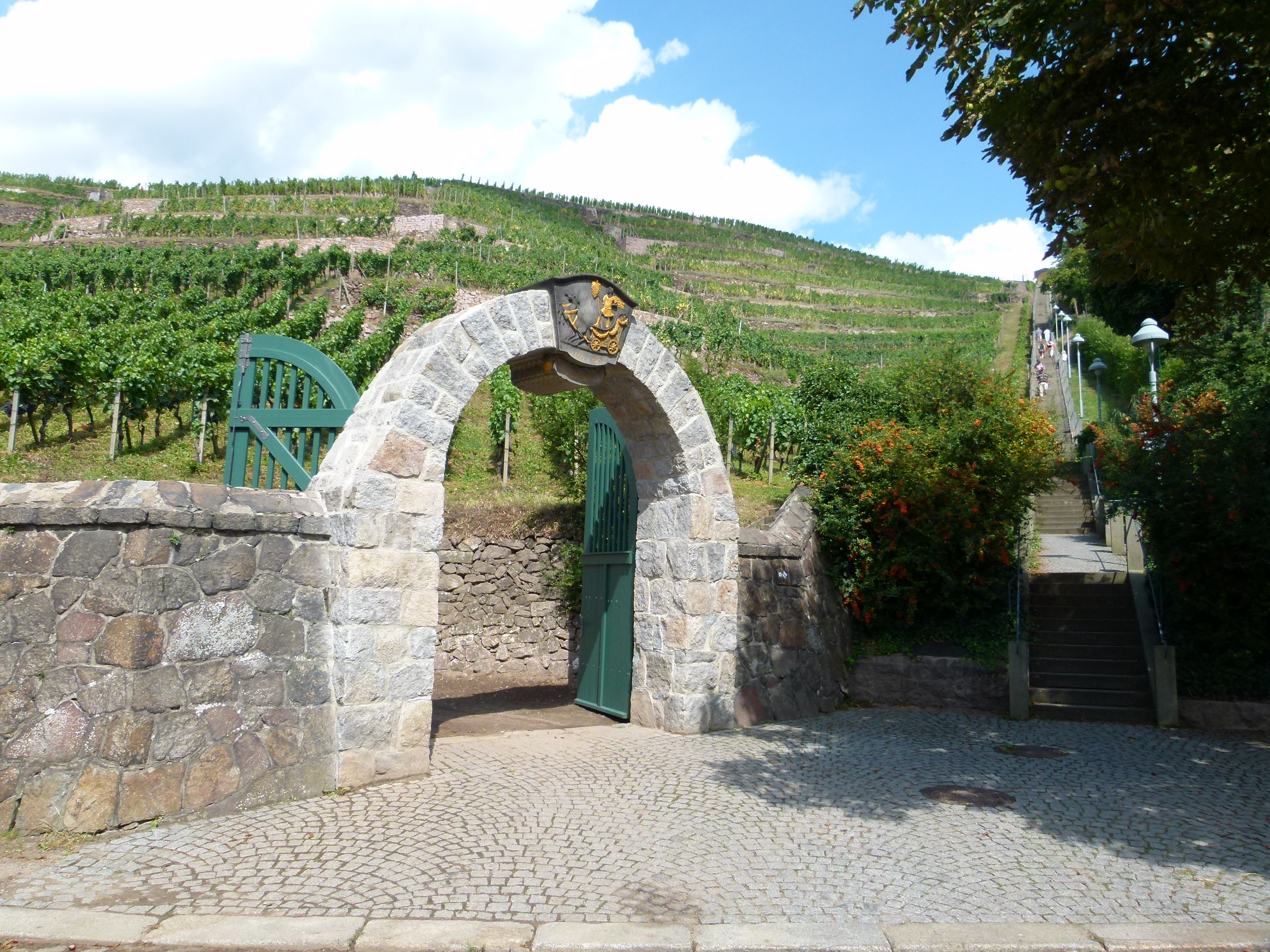
Gate Goldener Wagen, next to it the Spitzhaus Stairs

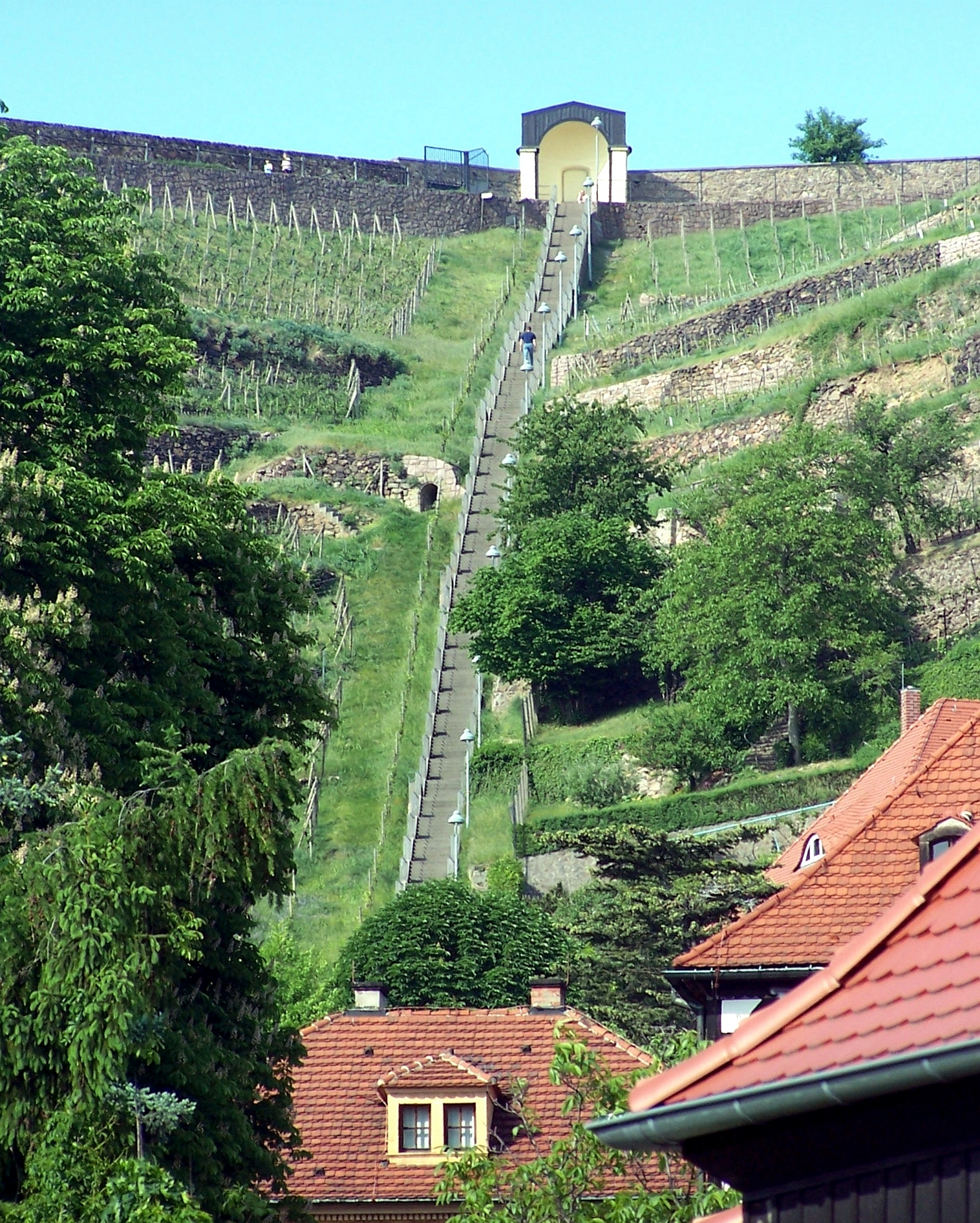
Spitzhaus Stairs with shell pavilion

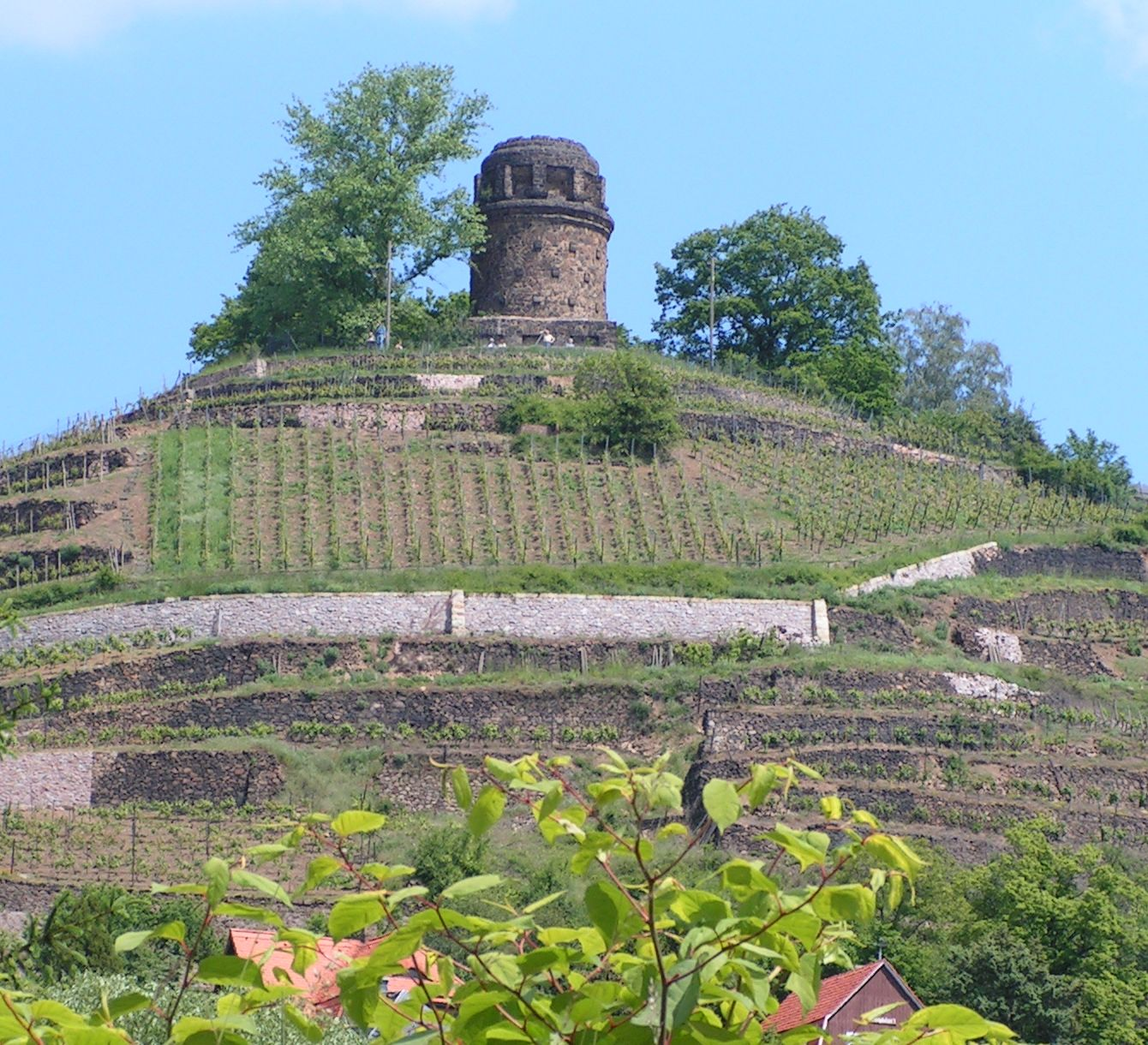
Bismarck Tower

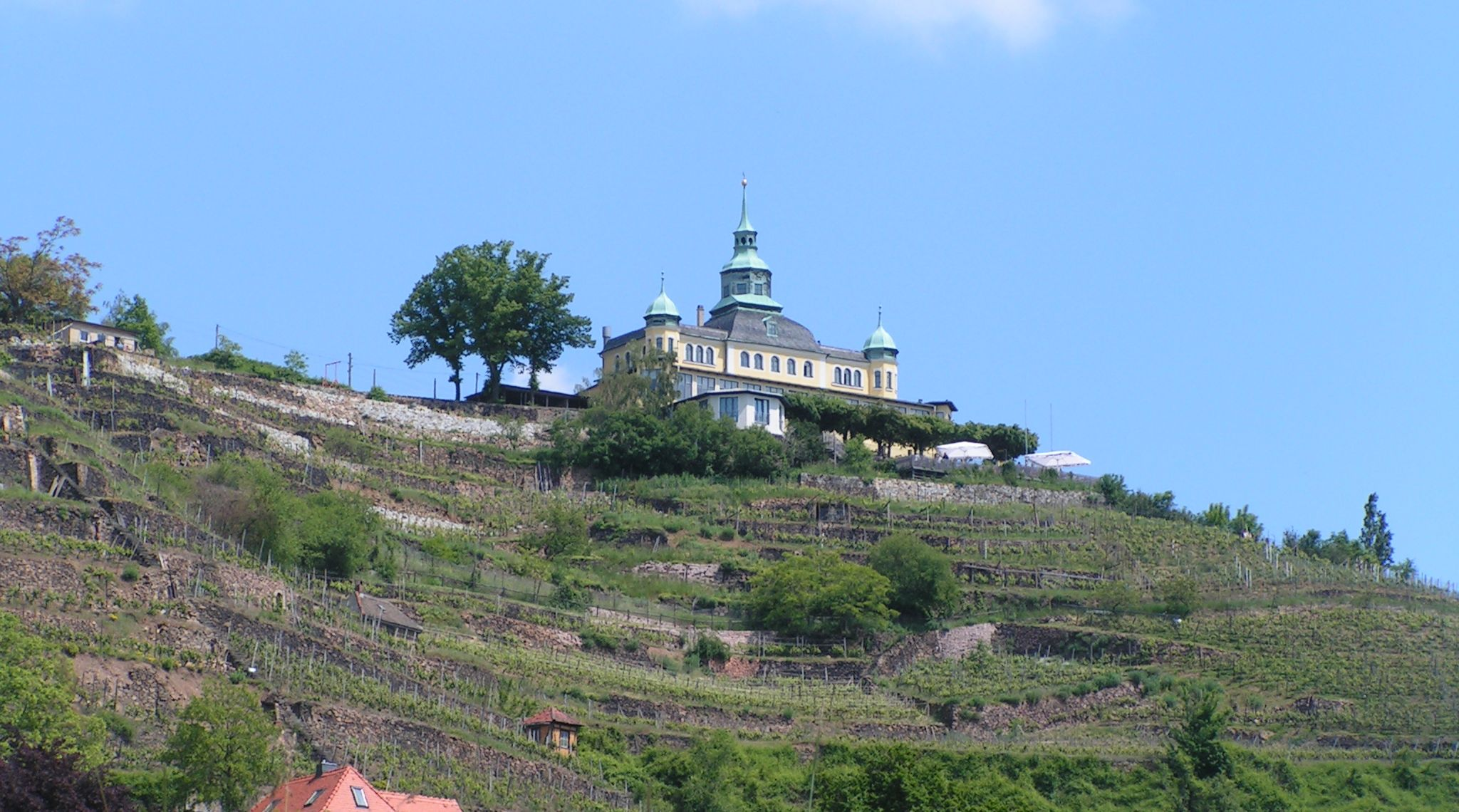
Spitzhaus

=== Gate system, lower stairs, wood yard, winemaker's house with bakery, transformer station ===
South and below the terrace on which the actual wine estate property lies and to which a staircase leads up, stands an entrance gate of massive sandstone pillars with ball crowning. On the left side of the stairs up to the manor farm lies the former wood yard of the Hoflößnitz. The still existing building dates in its core from the 18th century; it was raised to two stories in 1891 and converted into a rural residential house.

Outside the gate lies on the right side the transformer station of 1949 (block station), inside the gate lies on the right the winemaker's house with the attached bakery built in the first half of the 19th century (today the guest house of the Hoflößnitz).

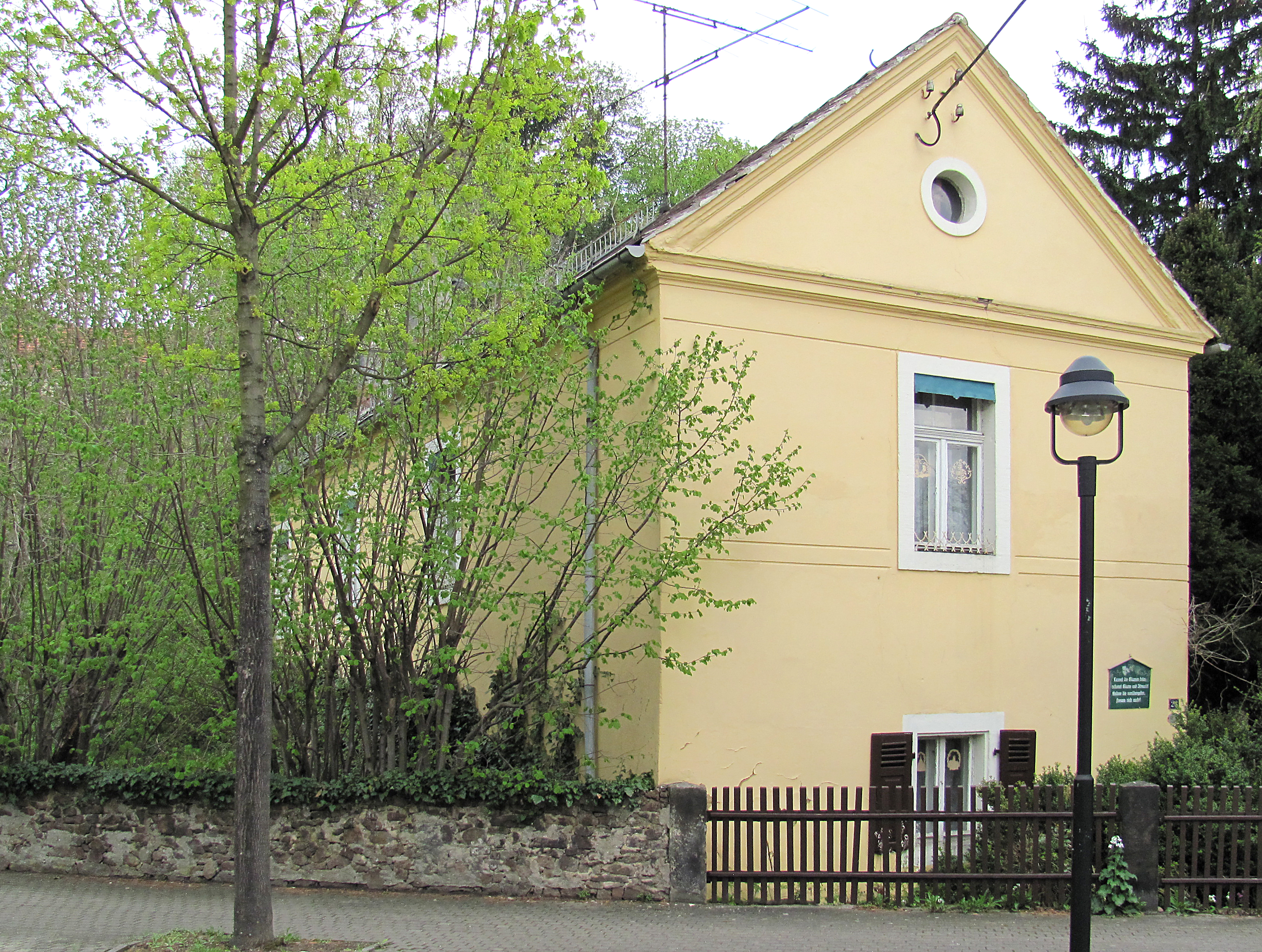
Residential house of the wood yard (west of the stairs)

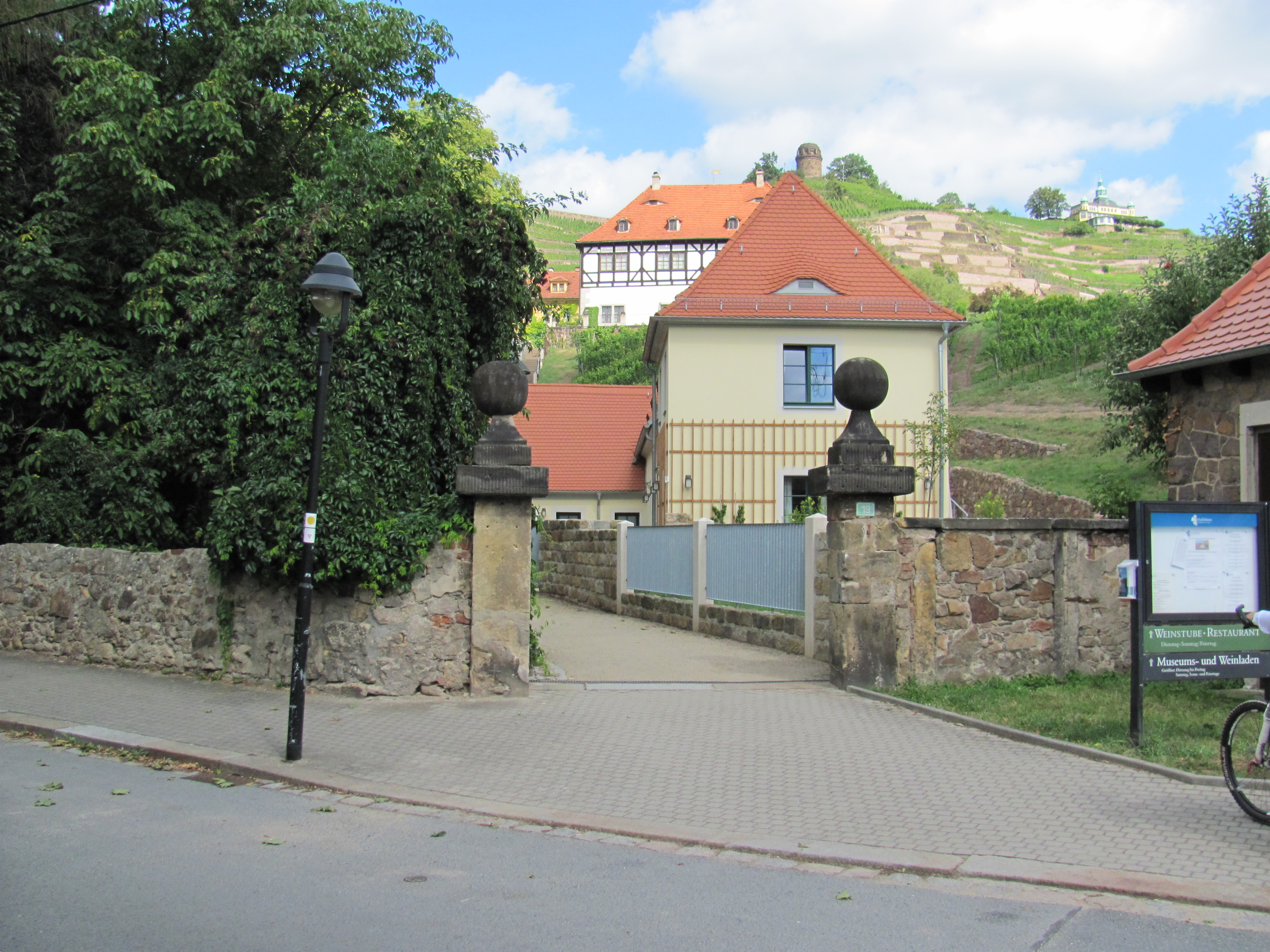
Lower gate system to the Hoflößnitz, right behind it winemaker's house and bakery

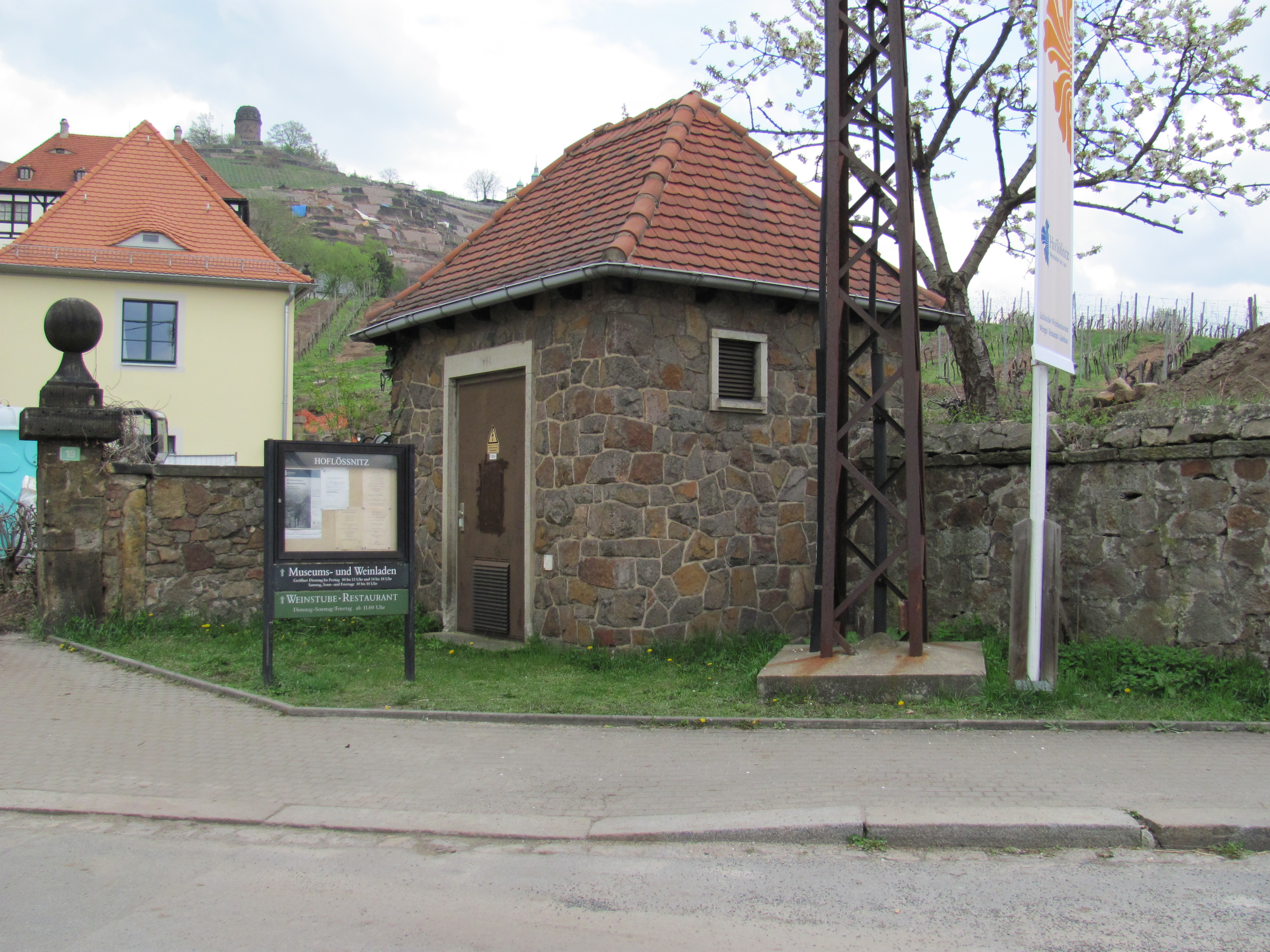
Block station Hoflößnitz, in the background the Bismarck Tower

=== Manor farm ===
The actual manor farm ensemble stands as an approximately longitudinal rectangular building group on the upper heath sand terrace below the steep ascent of the Elbe slope, a part of the Lusatian Fault, which leads to the high plateau of the Lusatian Plateau. To the west lies the extension of the Lößnitzgrund and further east the terrace passes into the Junge Heide.

From the southern direction, the staircase ascent to the manor farm leads approximately in the middle. Right, in the southeastern corner, stands the mountain and pleasure house, west is the terrace stocked with large horse chestnuts, to which, forming the southwest corner, the winemaker's parlor and around the corner the residential house adjoin.

On the north side lies left the press house, between it and the residential house a footpath leads at the northwestern corner out to Hoflößnitzstraße. Right stands the cavalier house, right next to it leads to the lower part of the Spitzhaus Stairs, which leads out of the manor farm to the north.

On the east side of the farm a massive entrance gate leads to the Knohllweg between the vineyards.

==== Inner courtyard ====
In the inner courtyard several paths and the chestnut terrace with a water-bound surface are paved. Between them are larger lawn areas, which are slightly raised and bordered.

In some places stand baroque vases; right at the gate system is a sandstone artwork. Wine barrels point to the long history of viticulture.

In front of the left side of the mountain and pleasure house stands under a housing from 1952 the Gray Press from the winery of the same name in the northern neighboring Wahnsdorf, a two-spindle wine press.

In the inner courtyard stood for a long time the oldest and most important sandstone sculpture of Radebeul, the figure group Chronos and the Mourning Woman or Chronos and lamenting woman, first unprotected in front of the west wall of the vineyard palace, later under a canopy on the east side of the cavalier house. After restoration in 2005 it was placed in the churchyard of the Peace Church.

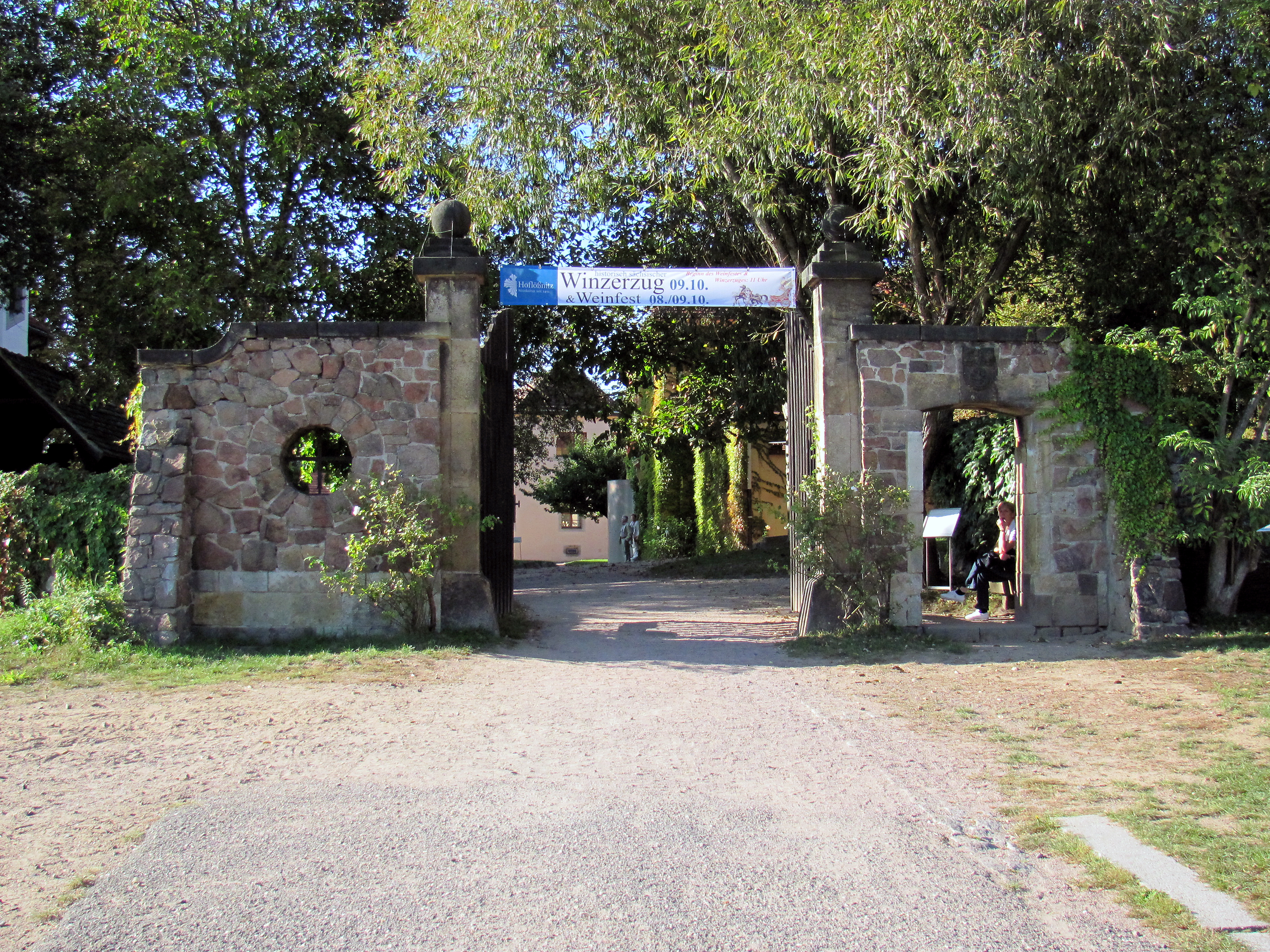
Gate system to the manor farm, from the Knohllweg

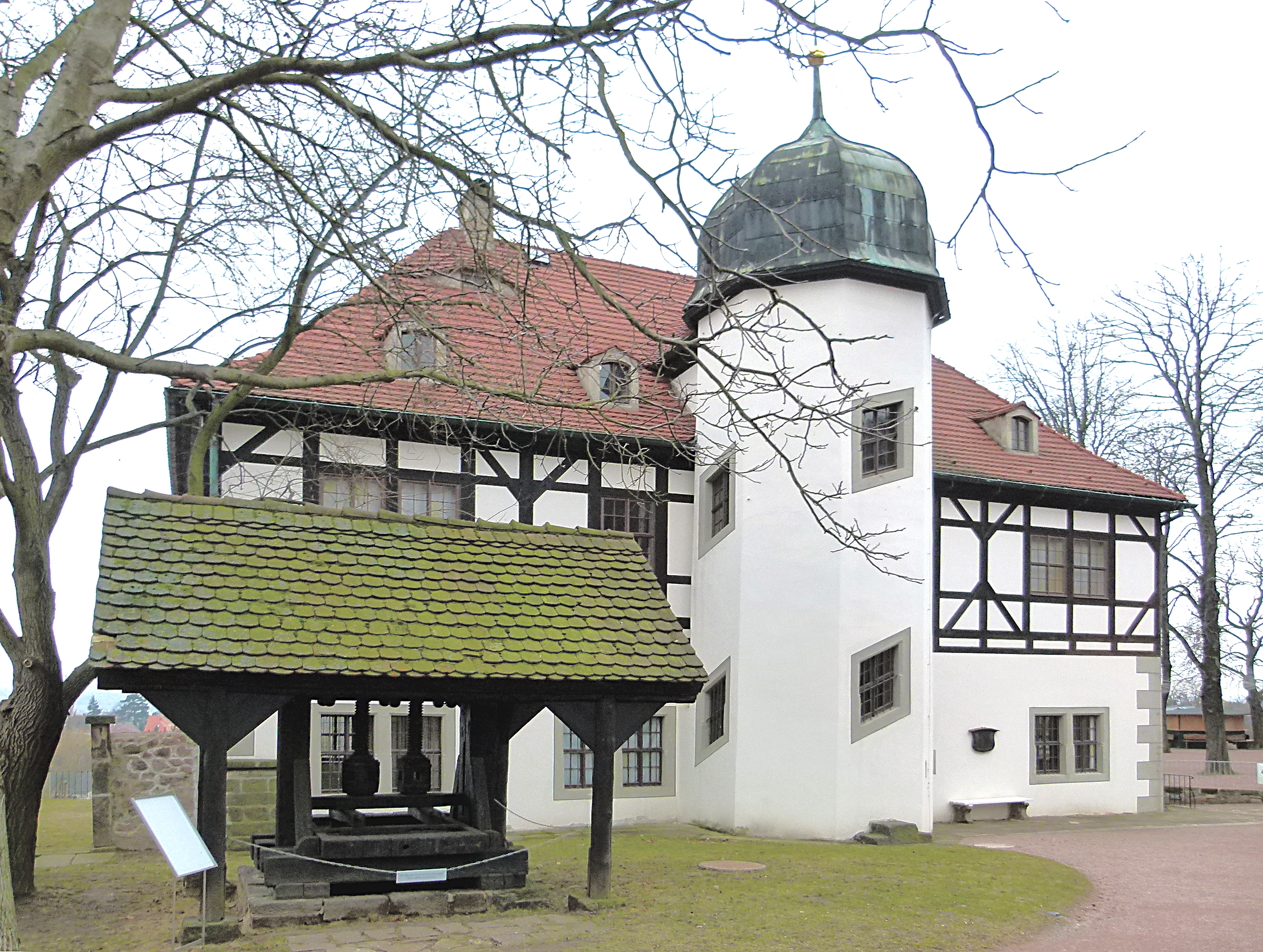
Historic wine press (Gray Press) in front of the main house

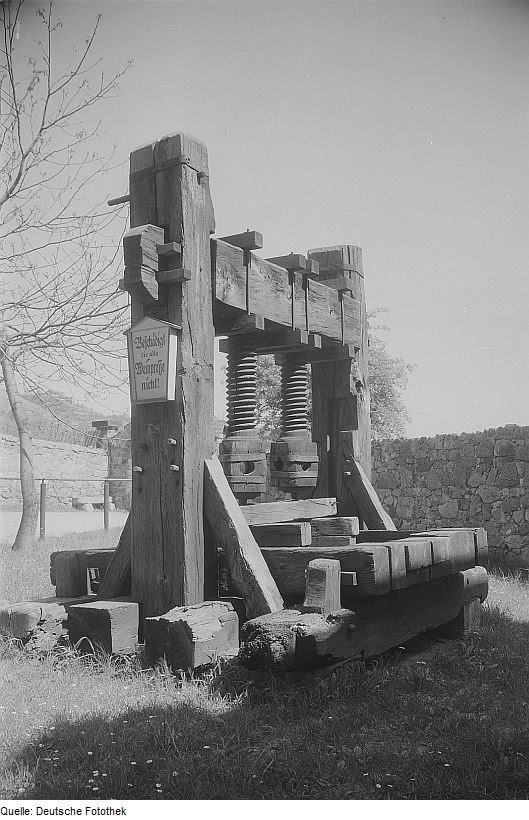
Historic wine press (Gray Press) still without housing (photo Richard Peter, before 1945)

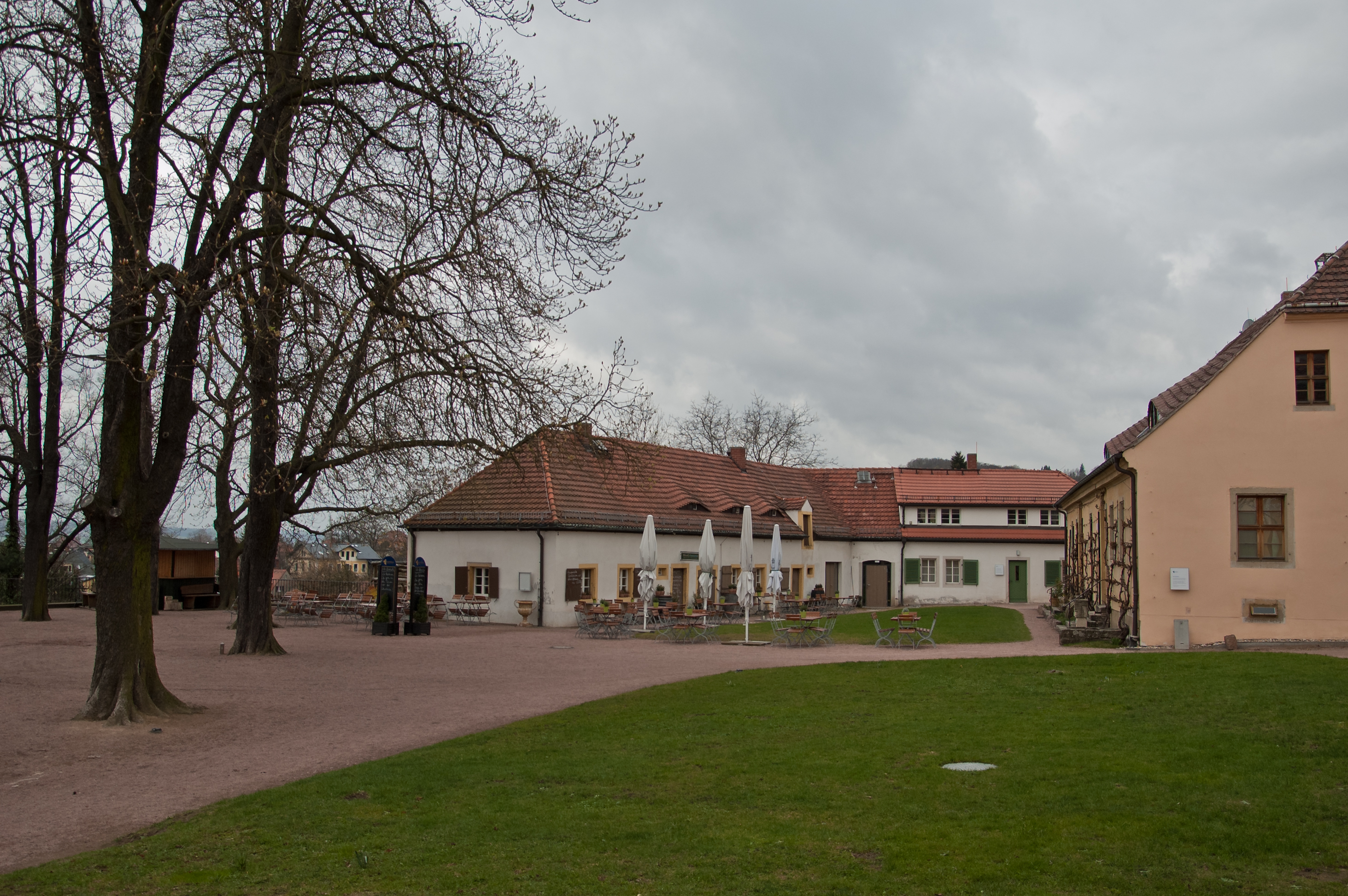
Western half of the courtyard: Chestnut terrace, winemaker's parlor, residential house and press house

==== North side: Press house, mountain administrator house (cavalier house) ====
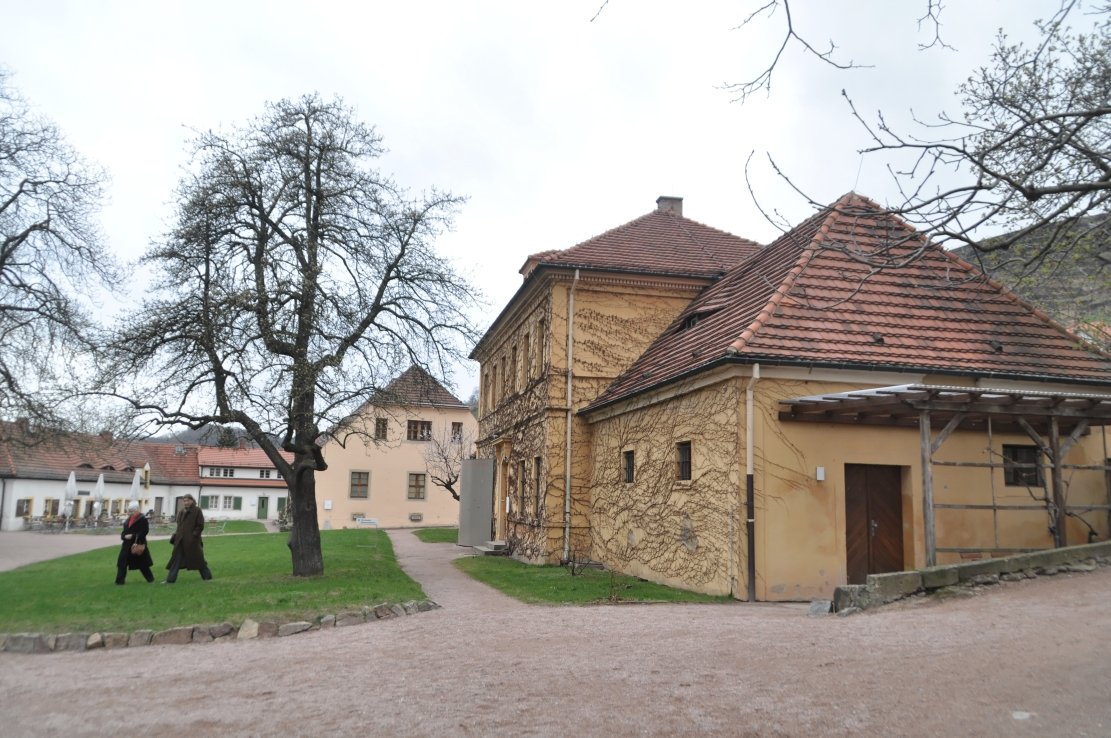
Right cavalier house, in front of whose extension the ascent to the Spitzhaus Stairs begins

The former press house standing to the west is a single-story building with a tile-covered cripple hip roof with two bat dormers. The seven-axial courtyard view is symmetrically structured: centrally a window, then on both sides doors with three-sided free stairs, then two windows each. The simple plaster building is stylized in a classicist manner. The side view is three-axial both on the ground floor and in the gable.

The former mountain administrator house next to it (cavalier house) is a two-story central building with two single-story wing buildings. The central building under the flat inclined hip roof has a symmetrical six-axial courtyard view on the upper floor; on the ground floor the two middle axes are combined into a segmental arch portal with canopy. The facade is structured by cornices and framed by corner pilasters.

From the two side views protrude the building bodies from around 1650 of the kitchen and stable buildings from the main building. Inside, in the east wing cross vaulting with two sandstone pillars are preserved.

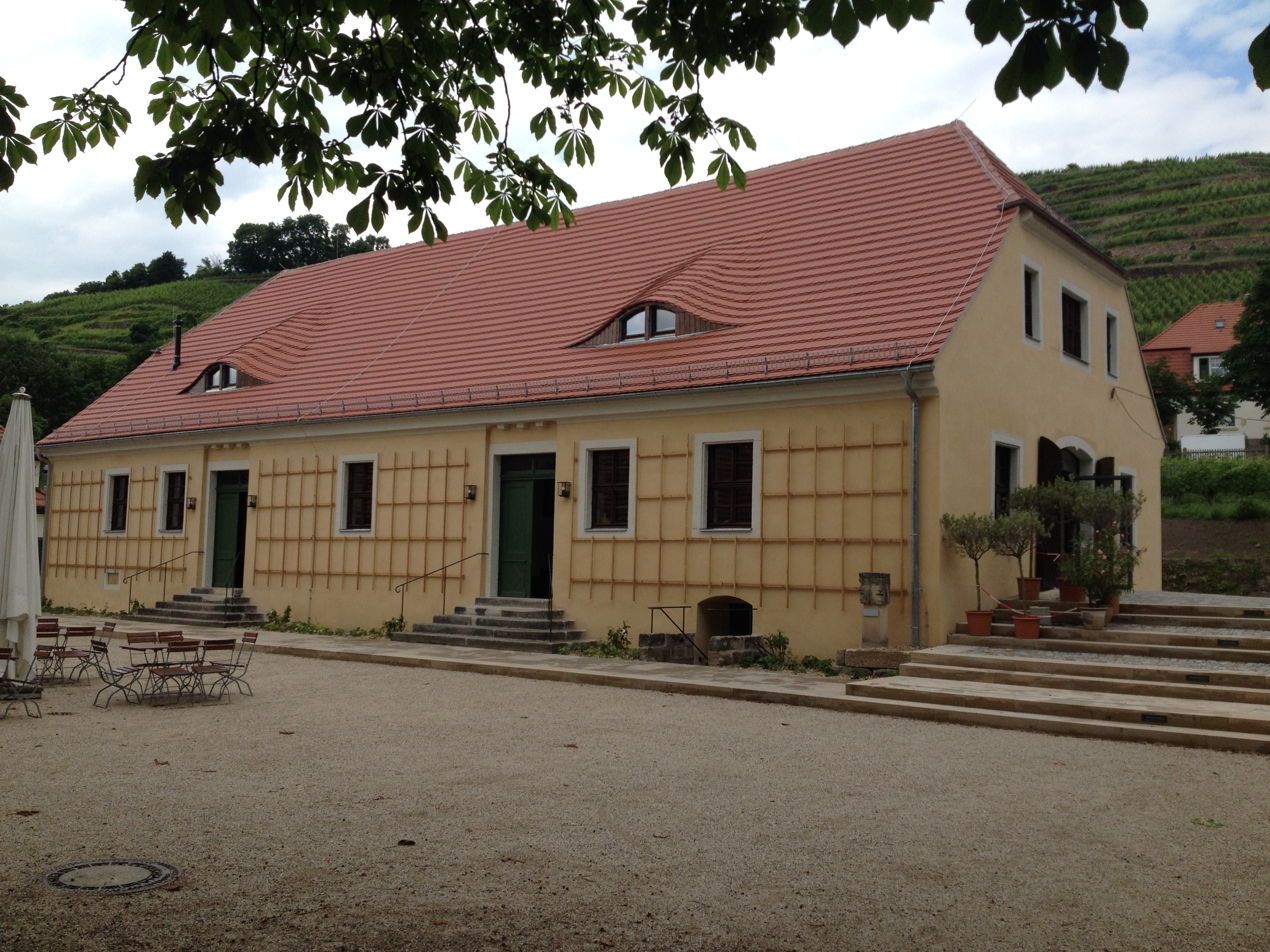
Press house after renovation 2016

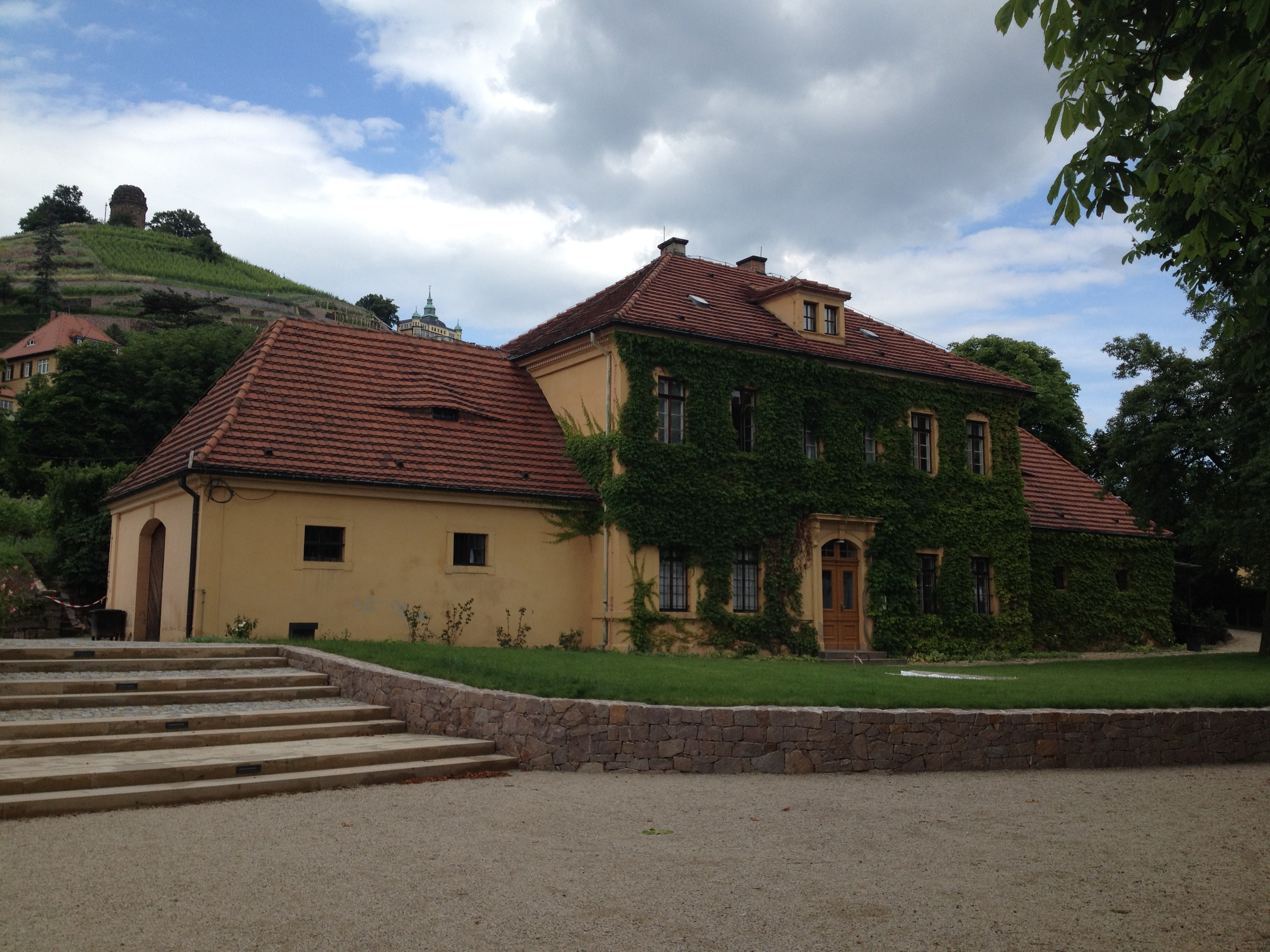
Cavalier house

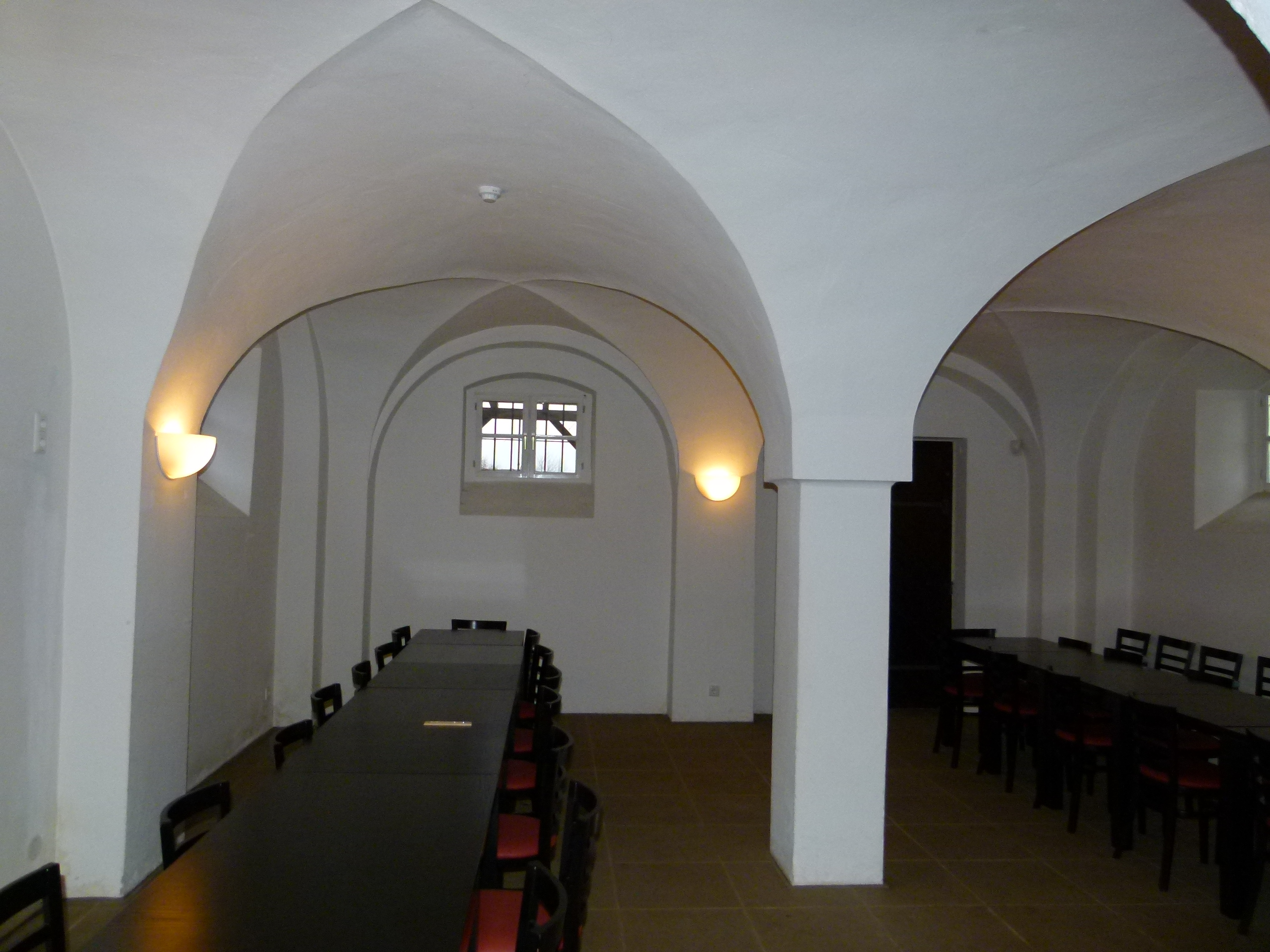
Cross vault room in the cavalier house wing

==== Southwest corner: Farm building, residential house ====
The farm building at the southwest corner was originally the cellar parlor with the underlying wine cellar, a winemaker's apartment and a stable part. Today the restaurant is set up in the southern part. It is a simple, single-story plaster building with an undeveloped, tile-covered hip roof in beaver-tail crown covering. In the roof are three bat dormers and a dormer with door to the courtyard for loading the former storage floor. Several doors lead into the utility building. At the windows are one-sided simple shutters from the original period.

The west part of the building was converted a short distance after the bend to the north in 1920 into a residential house. The plans from 1913 came from Emil Högg. Today the management of the Hoflößnitz is located there. To allow an extension of the roof at the same building height as in the rest of the elongated building, another wall was built set back a bit in the roof and above it another, flatter roof; this resulted in a kind of drag dormer over the entire width of the building part and gives the impression of a two-story residential house, which for stylistic separation is also covered with a different type of roof tile. The windows on the ground floor are equipped with somewhat more elaborately designed, one-sided shutters.

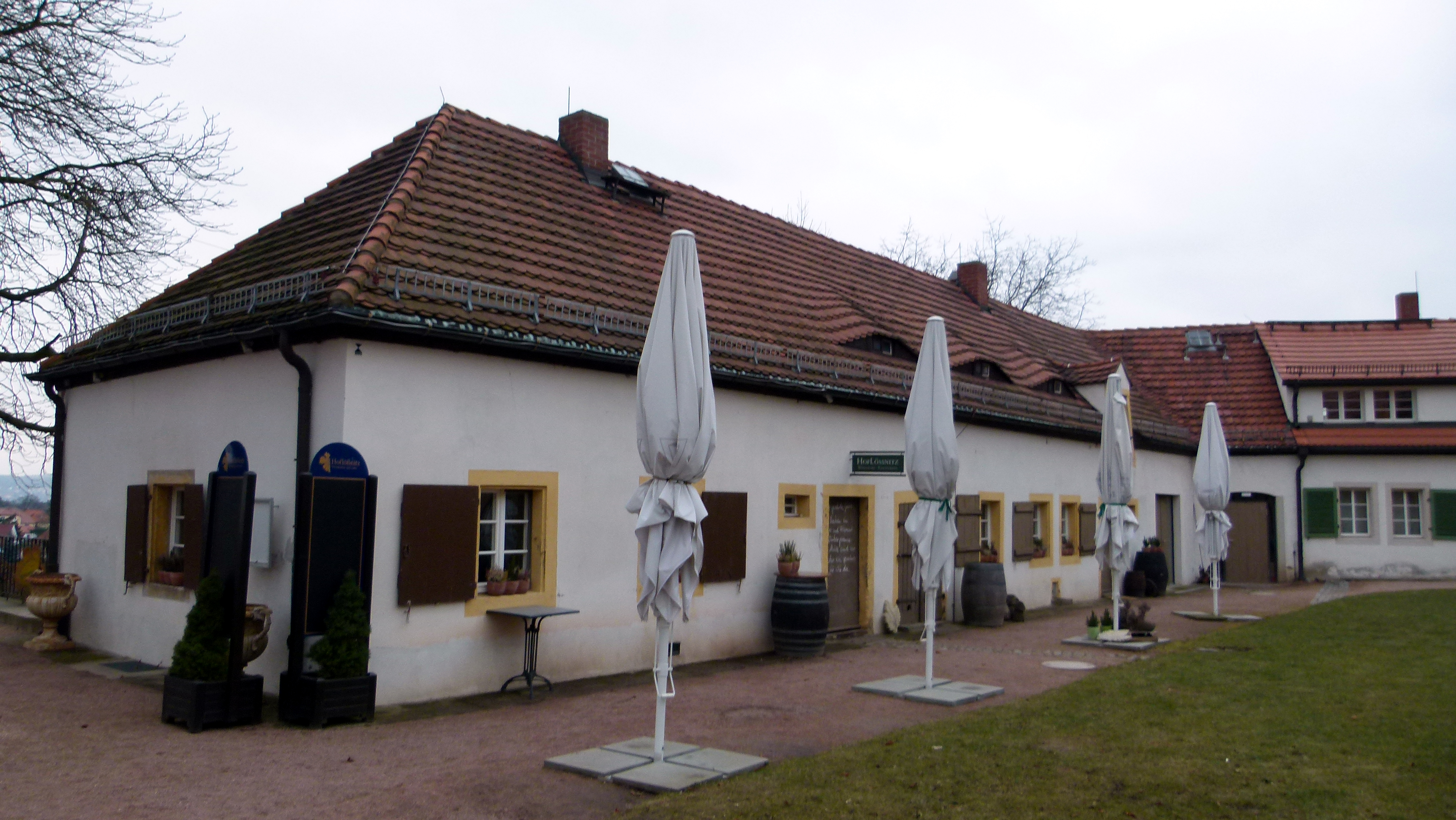
Winemaker's parlor (inn) and residential house

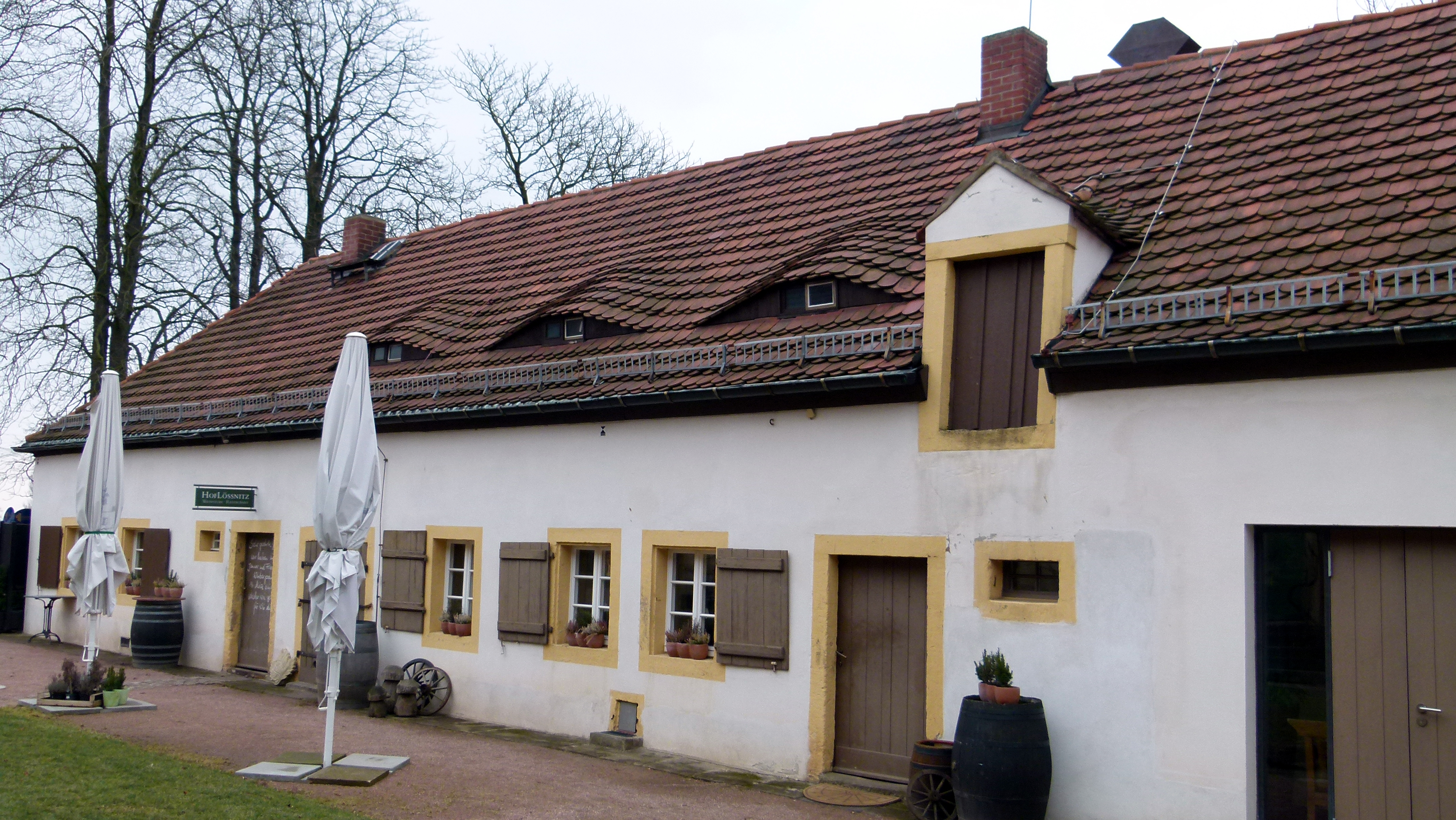
Dormer on the attic of the former farm and stable building

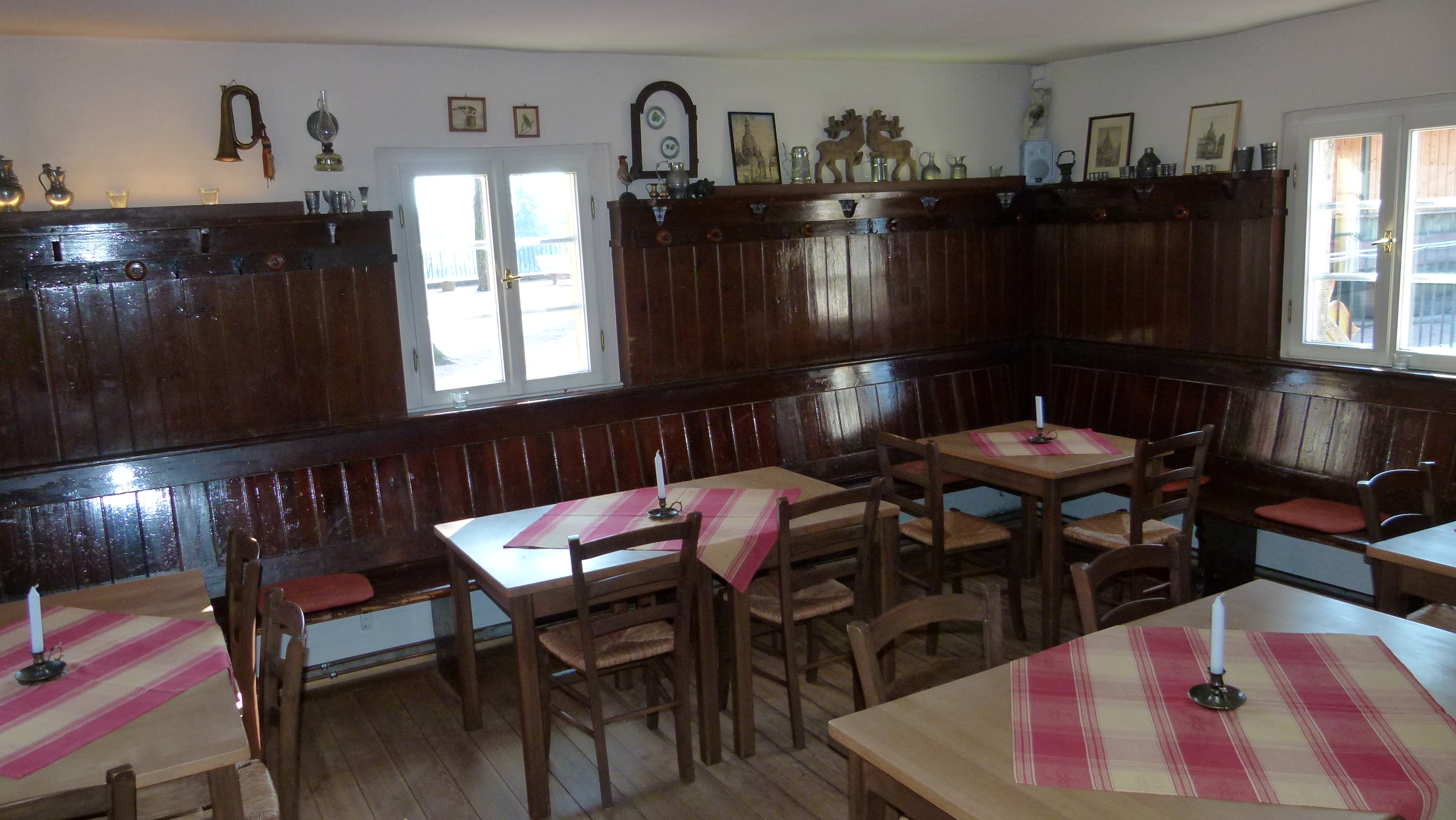
Inn inside

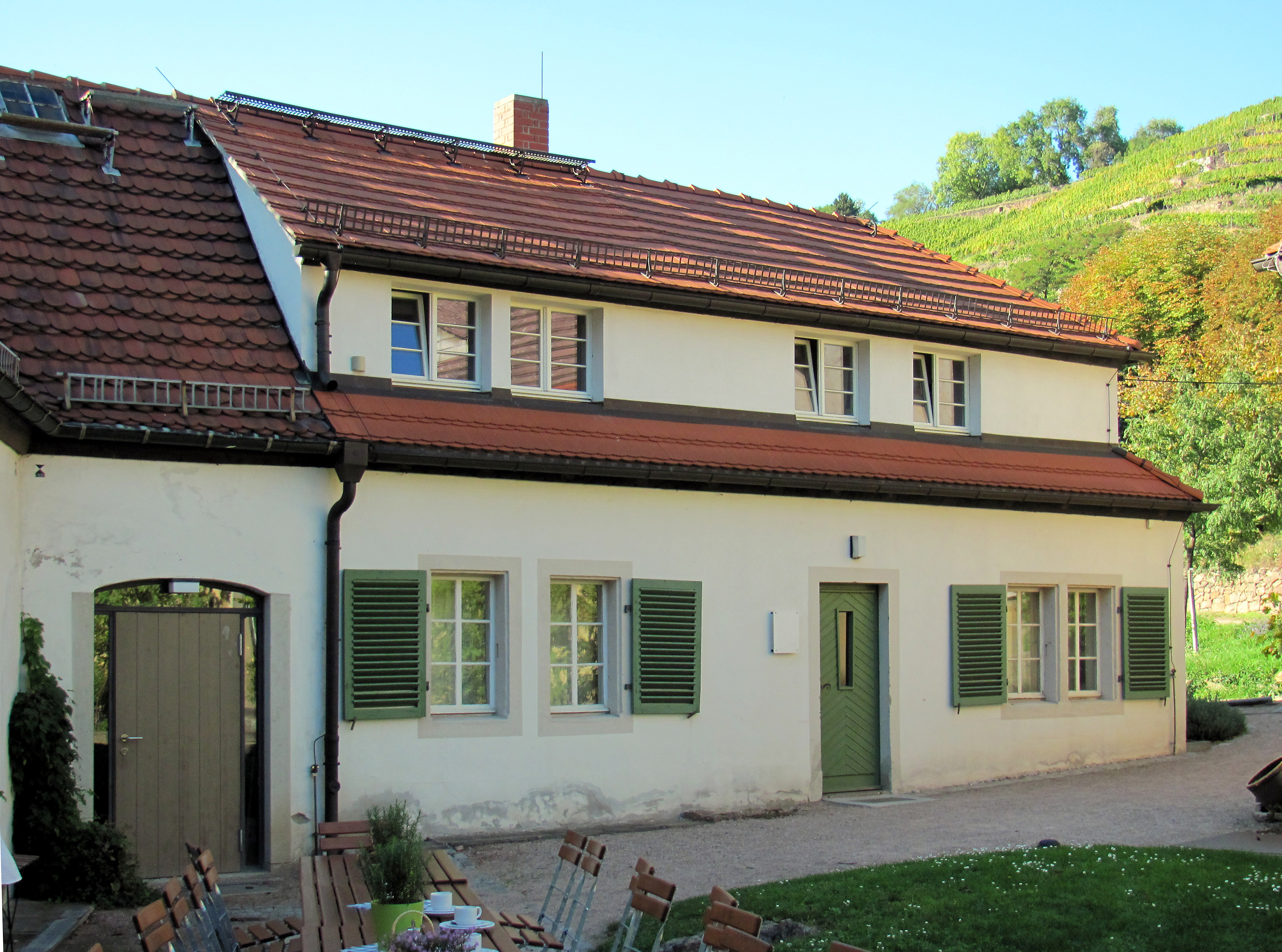
Högg's residential house, today seat of the management

==== Southeast side: Mountain and pleasure house (Hoflößnitz Palace, vineyard palace) ====
===== Exterior styling as vineyard house =====
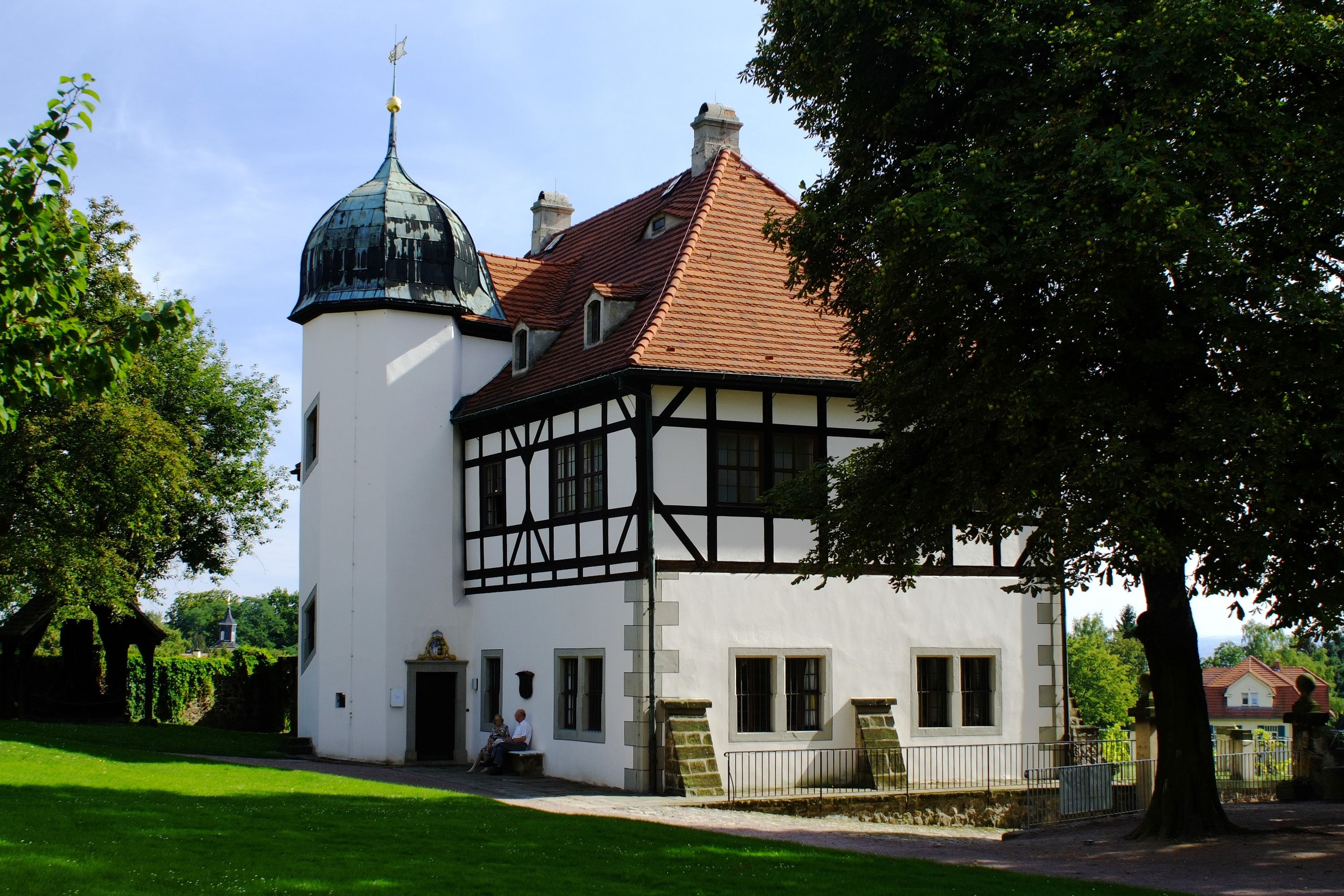
Mountain and pleasure house with the characteristic spiral staircase tower, there in the corner the entrance to the interior

The mountain and pleasure house, often also romantically called Hoflößnitz Palace, is the main building of the electoral or royal Saxon wine estate complex Hoflößnitz. As not mainly created for state-bearing representation purposes, but serving as a summer residence of the vineyard owner, a lordly pleasure palace on a country estate, it corresponds more to the type of the manor house. Many of these were created at that time in the region by lordly, mostly Dresden vineyard owners, starting with probably the oldest, the Bennoschlösschen in the Renaissance style, over rather simple ones like the Kynast up to externally representative ones like the Haus Sorgenfrei in the Dresden Zopfstil.

In contrast to the other Lößnitz manor houses, the mountain and pleasure house is characterized by the octagonal staircase tower attached to the mountain side of the building body. This spiral staircase tower is plastered; it is illuminated on the north and east sides by windows adapted to the angles of the stair rise. On the west side is the entrance door with a richly decorated, partially gilded coat of arms above it. The tower shaft extends up to a copper-covered curved dome at half the height of the hip roof. On it sits a gilded ball and above it a gilded weather vane with the Saxon electoral coat of arms and the dating 1677.

===== Interior design in representative Mannerism or Baroque =====
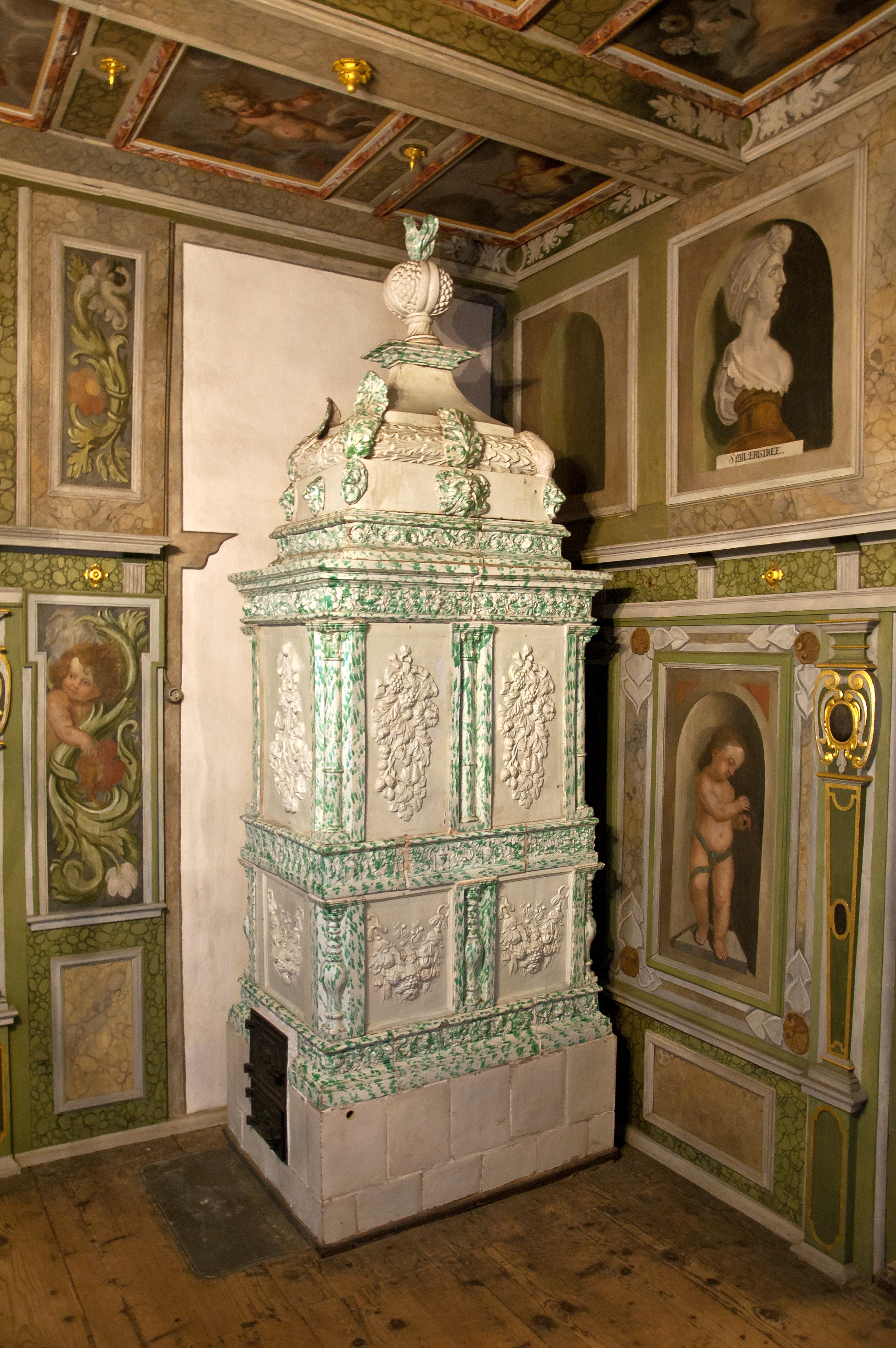
Tile stove in the Electress's chamber

On the ground floor a museum documents the history of viticulture on the estate as well as in Saxony.

The electoral living and representation rooms on the upper floor are considered one of the few examples of intact preserved interior architecture of the 17th century in Saxony at the stylistic boundary between late Mannerism and Baroque. The highlight is the banquet hall: In the 80 square fields of the beam ceiling Albert Eckhout painted tropical birds after inspirations from his trip to Brazil. The paneled walls are painted with the cardinal virtues and further female allegorical figures, emblems and maxims in the basic tones green and gray with gilding. The composition is attributed to Christian Schiebling (1603–1663), the designer of the Giant Hall in the Dresden Residential Palace. The painting of the electoral living and sleeping rooms including the chimneys and Meissen stoves also dates from the time of Johann Georg II.

== Persons associated with the Hoflößnitz ==
=== Rulers ===
- The Margraves of Meissen (from 1401), in particular:
  - William I, the One-Eyed (1343–1407), acquisition 1401 for the Wettin ruling house
- The Electors and Kings of Saxony, in particular:
  - Christian I (1560–1591), issuance of the wine mountain order
  - John George I (1585–1656), Elector until 1656, 1648/1650 construction of the mountain and pleasure house, then first design
  - John George II (1613–1680), Elector from 1656, further design of the mountain and pleasure house especially through exotic bird pictures, wine festivals
  - Frederick Augustus I (the Strong; 1670–1733), Elector, took over the Spitzhaus in 1710 from Countess Cosel back into electoral possession, significant costume wine festivals 1715, 1719 and 1727
  - Frederick Augustus II (1696–1763), Elector, construction of the Spitzhaus Stairs and baroqueization of the Spitzhaus

=== Master builders, architects, monument preservers and artists ===
- Ezechiel Eckhardt (baptized 1595; † after 1673), land master builder, 1648/1650 construction of the mountain and pleasure house
- Albert Eckhout (* around 1607; † end 1665 or beginning 1666), Dutch painter, Saxon court painter, created the exotic bird pictures for the ceiling of the banquet hall
- Christian Schiebling (1603–1663), court painter, painting of the mountain and pleasure house
- Centurio Wiebel (1616–1684), court painter, painting of the mountain and pleasure house
- Wolf Caspar von Klengel (1630–1691), master builder, placed the pointed roof in 1672 on the outwork building belonging to the Hoflößnitz, from then on called pointed house
- Matthäus Daniel Pöppelmann (1662–1736), chief land master builder, design of the Spitzhaus Stairs and baroqueization of the Spitzhaus
- Moritz Retzsch (1779–1857), draftsman, painter, etcher and Oberlößnitz vineyard owner, drew in 1840 the wine festival procession of the Saxon viticulture society organized by him
- Carl Mildreich Barth (* before 1797; † after 1843), land master builder, restoration of the burned press house, construction of the mountain administrator house
- Karl Moritz Haenel (1809–1880), chief land master builder, restoration of the Spitzhaus Stairs 1845
- Emil Högg (1867–1954), architect and arts and craftsman, "saved" from 1912 the mountain and pleasure house through dismantling, restyling and repair, plans for further conversions of the surrounding buildings, board member in the Hoflößnitz Association
- Burkhart Ebe (1881–1949), sculptor and plastic artist, his artificial stone relief grape harvest stands in the outdoor area of the Hoflößnitz
- Walter Bachmann (1883–1958), state conservator, built the local history museum in 1924
- Georg Richter-Lößnitz (1891–1938), painter and etcher, painted the Hoflößnitz after its restyling
- Franz Jörissen (1895–1996), master builder, took care of the preservation of the Hoflößnitz in the GDR era
- Heinrich Magirius (1934–2021), art historian and monument preserver, took care of the monument preservation of the Hoflößnitz in the GDR era
- Gunter Herrmann (1938–2019), painter and restorer, restored paintings on and in the Hoflößnitz in the GDR era
- Ulrich Aust (1942–1992), architect and Zwinger master builder, took care of the structural preservation of the Hoflößnitz in the GDR era

=== Viticulture specialists ===
- Johann Paul Knohll (around 1628–around 1708/after 1702), office, construction and vineyard clerk, wine specialist and viticulture author
- Johann Gottlob Mehlig (1809–1870), court winemaker at the Hohes Haus (Spitzhaus), from 1863 mountain bailiff of the Hoflößnitz and its chronicler from 1835 to 1870
- Carl Pfeiffer (1872–1946), agricultural councilor and oenologist, rebuilt the Lößnitz viticulture after the phylloxera catastrophe from the Hoflößnitz, chairman of the Saxon Viticulture Society

=== Residents, others ===
- Martin Stephan (1777–1846), Saxon-American clergyman of the emigration movement, lived/hid around 1837 with his followers on a vineyard of the Hoflößnitz, before they emigrated
- Bernhard von Rabenhorst (1801–1873), Saxon war minister and general, retired to Hoflößnitz, where he also died in 1873

== Bibliography ==
- Frank Andert (Ed.): Stadtlexikon Radebeul. Historisches Handbuch für die Lößnitz. Ed.: Stadtarchiv Radebeul. 2nd, slightly revised edition. City Archives, Radebeul 2006, ISBN 3-938460-05-9.
- Frank Andert (July 2012). "Die Hoflößnitz – 100 Jahre öffentliches Denkmal". Vorschau & Rückblick; Monatsheft für Radebeul und Umgebung.
- Hans Beschorner: Die Hoflößnitz bei Dresden. In: Dresdner Geschichtsblätter 13, 1904, pp. 9–226, pp. 239–247.
- Hans Beschorner: Die Hoflößnitz bei Dresden (= Geschichtliche Wanderfahrten. Volume 10). Dresden 1931.
- Georg Dehio: Oberlössnitz. Hoflößnitz. In: Handbuch der deutschen Kunstdenkmäler. Volume 1: Mitteldeutschland. Wasmuth, Berlin 1905, p. 236 (digi.ub.uni-heidelberg.de).
- Barbara Bechter, Wiebke Fastenrath u. a. (Ed.): Handbuch der Deutschen Kunstdenkmäler, Sachsen I, Regierungsbezirk Dresden. Deutscher Kunstverlag, München 1996, ISBN 3-422-03043-3, pp. 733–735.
- Matthias Donath, Jörg Blobelt (Fotos): Sächsisches Weinland. Historische Weingüter und Weinberghäuser im Elbtal. Ed.: edition Sächsische Zeitung. 1st edition. Elbland Editorial and Publishing Company, Dresden 2010, ISBN 978-3-941595-09-5.
- Cornelius Gurlitt: Oberlössnitz; Hoflössnitz. In: Beschreibende Darstellung der älteren Bau- und Kunstdenkmäler des Königreichs Sachsen. 26th issue: The Art Monuments of Dresden's Surroundings, Part 2: Dresden-Neustadt District Administration. C. C. Meinhold, Dresden 1904, pp. 136–149.
- Volker Helas (Ed.): Stadt Radebeul. Ed.: Landesamt für Denkmalpflege Sachsen, Große Kreisstadt Radebeul (= Denkmaltopographie Bundesrepublik Deutschland. Monuments in Saxony). Sax-Verlag, Beucha 2007, ISBN 978-3-86729-004-3.
- Karl Julius Hofmann: Das Meißner Niederland in seinen Naturschönheiten und Merkwürdigkeiten oder das sächsische Italien in den Meißner und Dresdner Gegenden mit ihren Ortschaften. Ein Volksbuch für Natur und Vaterlandsfreunde topographisch historisch und poetisch dargestellt. Louis Mosche, Meißen 1853, pp. 721–724. (books.google.de).
- Moritz Eduard Lilie: Chronik der Lößnitz-Ortschaften Kötzschenbroda, Niederlößnitz, Radebeul, Oberlößnitz mit Hoflößnitz, Serkowitz, Naundorf, Zitzschewig und Lindenau mit besonderer Berücksichtigung von Coswig und der übrigen Nachbarorte. Niederlößnitz 1893 (Digitalisat).
- Heinrich Magirius; Volkmar Billeb: Die Hoflößnitz (= Große Baudenkmäler. Issue 506), 1st edition, Deutscher Kunstverlag, Munich/Berlin 1996.
- Heinrich Magirius (Ed.): 600 Jahre Hoflößnitz. Historische Weingutanlage. Sandstein Verlag, Dresden 2001, ISBN 3-930382-60-1.
- Liselotte Schließer (Ed.): Radebeul – Stadtführer durch Vergangenheit und Gegenwart. 1st, expanded edition. Edition Reintzsch, Radebeul 2008, ISBN 978-3-930846-05-4.
- Hoflößnitz. In: August Schumann: Vollständiges Staats-, Post- und Zeitungslexikon von Sachsen. Volume 4. Schumann, Zwickau1817, pp. 128.
