= Meißen station =

Railway station in Meißen, Germany

Meißen
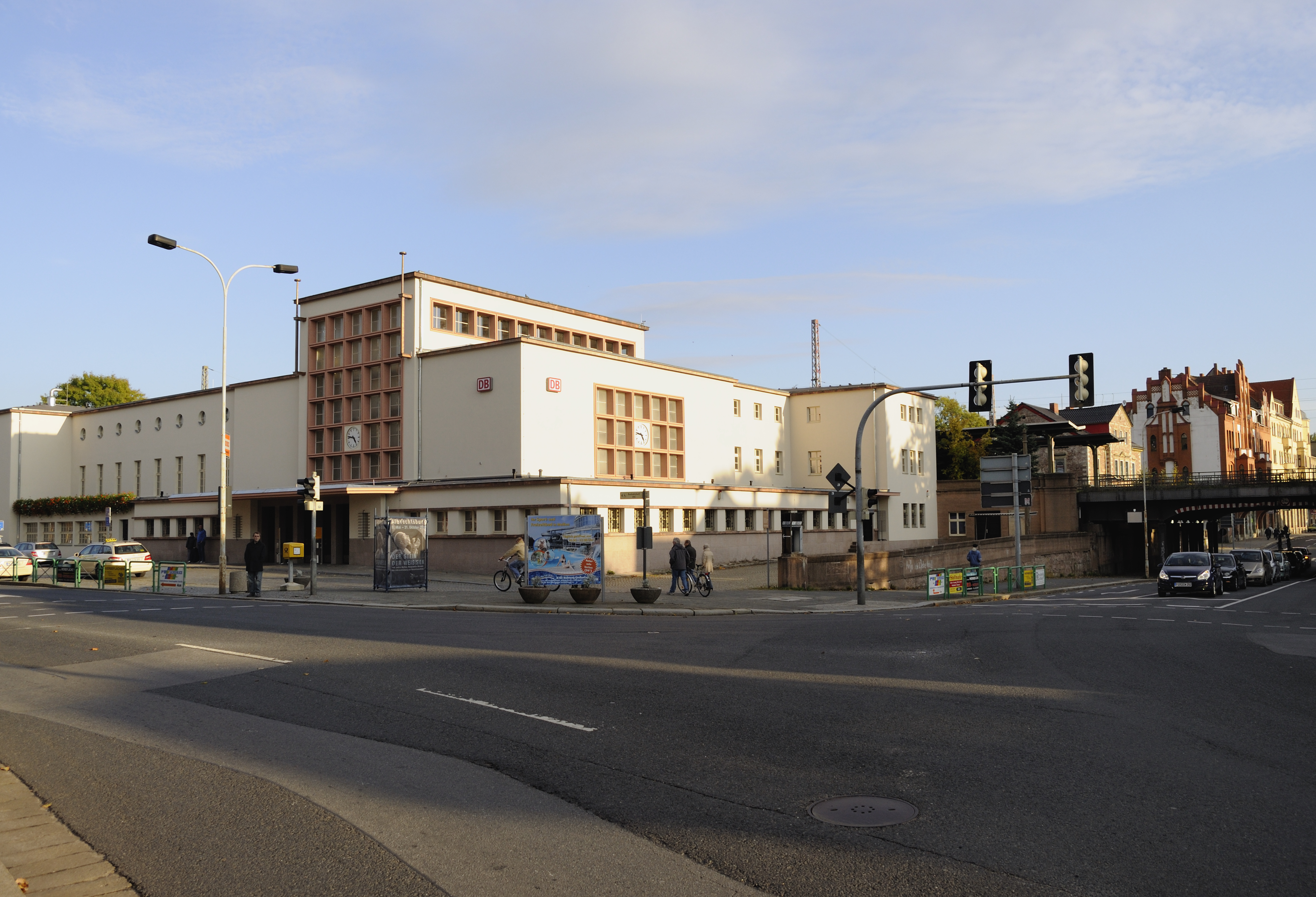
- The station building of 1928

General information
- Location: Meissen, Saxony; Germany
- Coordinates: 51.163056°N 13.4825°E
- Line: Borsdorf–Coswig (km 95.29)
- Platforms: 2

Construction
- Accessible: Yes

Other information
- Station code: 4036
- DS100 code: DME
- IBNR: 8012326
- Category: 5
- Website: www.bahnhof.de

History
- Opened: 1 December 1860

Services
Preceding station	Dresden S-Bahn	Following station
Meißen Altstadt towards Meißen Triebischtal	S 1	Neusörnewitz towards Schöna
Location

Meißen station is the largest railway station in the town of Meissen in the German state of Saxony. The station was opened in 1860 in the district of Cölln. Its entrance building, which was built in 1928, is a heritage-listed building and along with the Stuttgart Hauptbahnhof it is considered an architecturally significant transport complex of the interwar period. After the ending of long-distance traffic in the 1960s, the station is now a station of the Dresden S-Bahn with only regional significance.

== History ==
During the planning phase of Leipzig–Dresden railway, the Leipzig–Dresden Railway Company (Leipzig-Dresdner Eisenbahn-Compagnie), considered a route passing through Meißen, but, in 1835, it selected a route running further north via Riesa because of the more favourable topography. It proposed to connect the then important town of Meissen with a branch line. This meant that in 1839 the citizenry of Meissen needed to travel to Priestewitz station or Oberau station at the end of Oberau Tunnel to board trains, although from 1842 they could use Niederau station, which was around seven kilometres away. Two decades later, on 9 July 1860, the first sod was turned for the construction of the Coswig–Meißen branch line. The company opened it for passenger operations on 1 December 1860. At first, three pairs of trains a day ran from Meißen station to Dresden Leipziger Bahnhof (the company's station in Dresden). The trains on this 23 km long route stopped at Neusörnewitz, Coswig, Kötzschenbroda, Weintraube and Radebeul, taking 45 minutes.

The Borsdorf–Coswig railway was completed with the commissioning of the Nossen–Meißen section on 22 December 1868; the line now connected with the Leipzig–Dresden railway in both Borsdorf and Coswig. Meißen station was thus converted from a terminus into a through station and direct connections to Leipzig were now possible. Due to the unfavorable topography, this line never achieved the importance of the flatter line via Riesa; nevertheless, for a long time express trains also ran via Meissen.

At the beginning of the 20th century, Meißen station was rebuilt several times and extended so that it was barely able to cope with the sharp increase in traffic. The platform facilities and the entrance buildings were therefore rebuilt after the First World War to plans by the architect and professor of architecture Wilhelm Kreis and the municipal planner Mirus. The new facilities were inaugurated on 15 December 1928.

The operation of long-distance services via Meißen ended in 1965. Finally, the last long-distance services on the line were a pair of Warsaw–Leipzig expresses.

Electric operations in Meißen began on 18 December 1970 and Meissen was included in the network of newly created Dresden S-Bahn in September 1973. In preparation, the second track between Coswig and Meißen, which thad been dismantled for war reparations to the Soviet Union, was restored.

On 31 January 2000, Deutsche Bahn discontinued freight operations to Meißen.

In 2010, Deutsche Bahn renovated the station building. This included better insulation of the facade, new windows and upgrading of the waiting and transit areas. The majority of the investment of the €1.6 million came from the Federal Government’s economic stimulus program. For cost reasons, Deutsche Bahn concentrated on the rehabilitation of the original tile base of Meissen porcelain and the installation of a new lighting.

A renovation of platforms was done in 2012-2014 as part of the upgrade of the S-Bahn line to Meißen, which is due to be completed in 2016. Most of 2013 the station was served by the S-Bahn from Dresden which did not continue to Meißen Triebischtal, though. Rail services towards Leipzig had been suspended in 2013 due to the simultaneous renovation of the bridge over the Elbe.

Meißen station is served by S-Bahn line S1 services on the Meißen-Triebischtal–Dresden–Bad Schandau (–Schöna) route at 30-minute intervals. Until 14 December 2015 it had also been served by RB 110 services on the Leipzig–Meißen route every two hours.

== Description of buildings ==
=== Station of 1860 ===
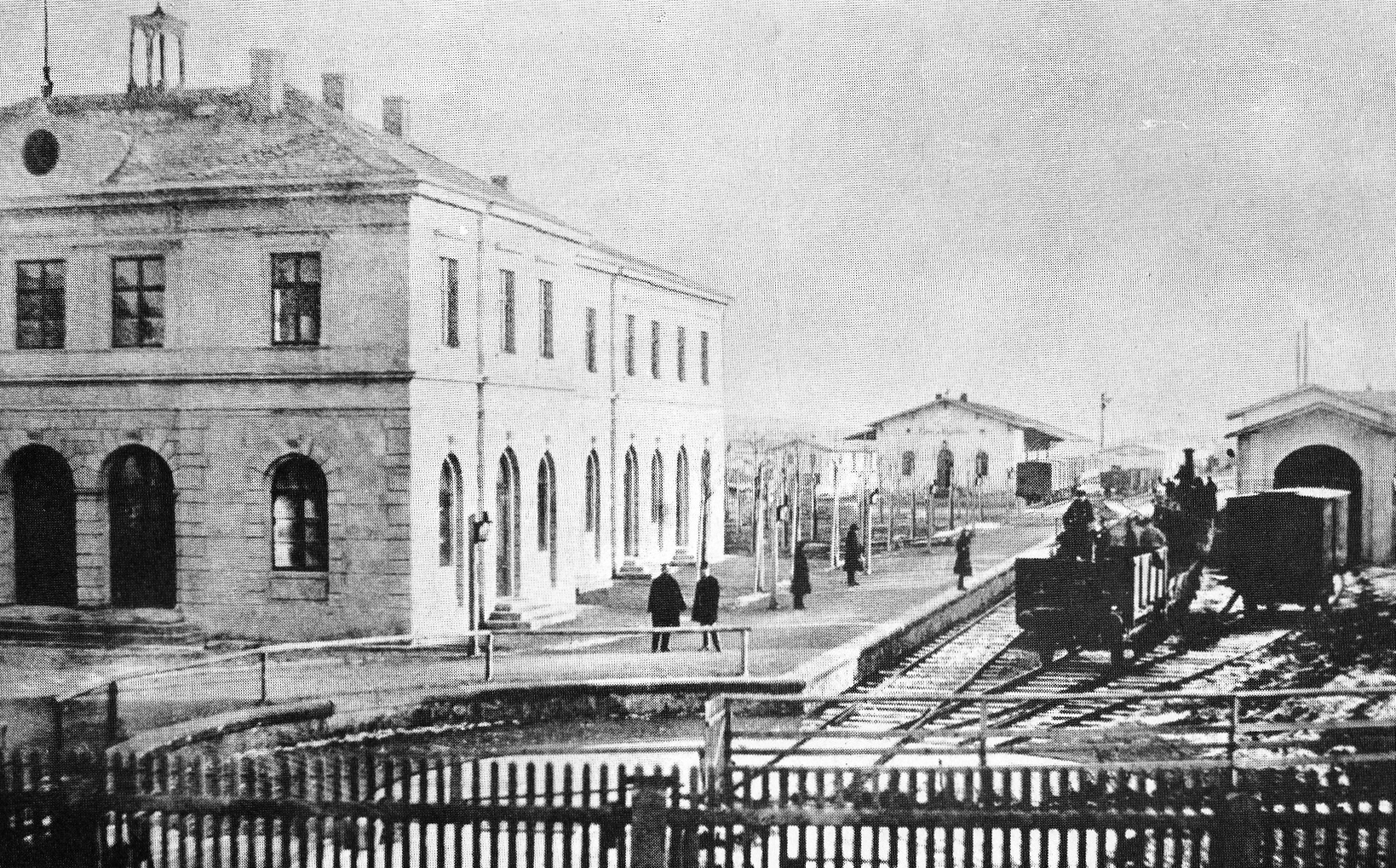
The opening of the station as a terminus

Although the station was originally the terminus of a branch line, the Renaissance Revival entrance building was built next to the track, so that the planned continuation of the line over the Elbe towards Triebischtal could be carried out without major structural alterations. In the entrance building there were a ticket and baggage counter, service rooms, a waiting room with a restaurant and a tavern for servants (Hausknechttrinkstube) and—due to the unheated carriages—hot water bottles for rental in winter. In addition to the entrance building, the station included at its opening a small carriage shed, a watering point and a goods shed. At its head there was a turntable to allow the reversal of locomotives and carriages. The turntable survived the station's conversion into a through station until 1910.

=== Station of 1928 ===
The entrance building is characterised as a functionally structured cubic building mass with gridded windows. The cornice strip of Rochlitzer porphyry contrasts starkly with its big, bright walls. With its asymmetric structure, the spacious lobby stands out as the dominant structure. It includes the services necessary for passengers who use a pedestrian subway to reach the elevated platforms.
