= Roßwein–Niederwiesa railway =

Railway line in Saxony, Germany

Overview
- Line number: 6620

Service
- Route number: 516

Technical
- Line length: 37.49 km (23.30 mi)
- Track gauge: 1,435 mm (4 ft 8 1/2 in) standard gauge
- Minimum radius: 290 m (951 ft)
- Operating speed: 80 km/h (49.7 mph) (maximum)
- Maximum incline: 1.4%

The Roßwein–Niederwiesa railway is a branch line in the German state of Saxony. It runs from Roßwein through the Striegis valley to Hainichen and on to Frankenberg and Niederwiesa, where the line ends at a junction with the Dresden–Werdau railway. Since 2004, only the 16.8 km long section between Niederwiesa and Hainichen is still operating.

== History ==
In the spring of 1867 construction began on the railway line between Niederwiesa and Hainichen. On 1 March 1869, the Royal Saxon State Railways (German: Königlich Sächsische Staatseisenbahnen) opened the line as a branch of the main line between Chemnitz and Dresden. Initially, only about two to three trains ran daily.

The Hainichen-Rosswein Railway Company (Hainichen-Rossweiner Eisenbahn-Gesellschaft), which had been founded in 1872, opened, on 15 August 1874, a new 17 km-long section from Hainichen to Roßwein to the Borsdorf–Coswig railway of the Leipzig–Dresden Railway Company. It was taken over by the Royal Saxon State Railways on 10 August 1876, which had managed operations on it from its opening.

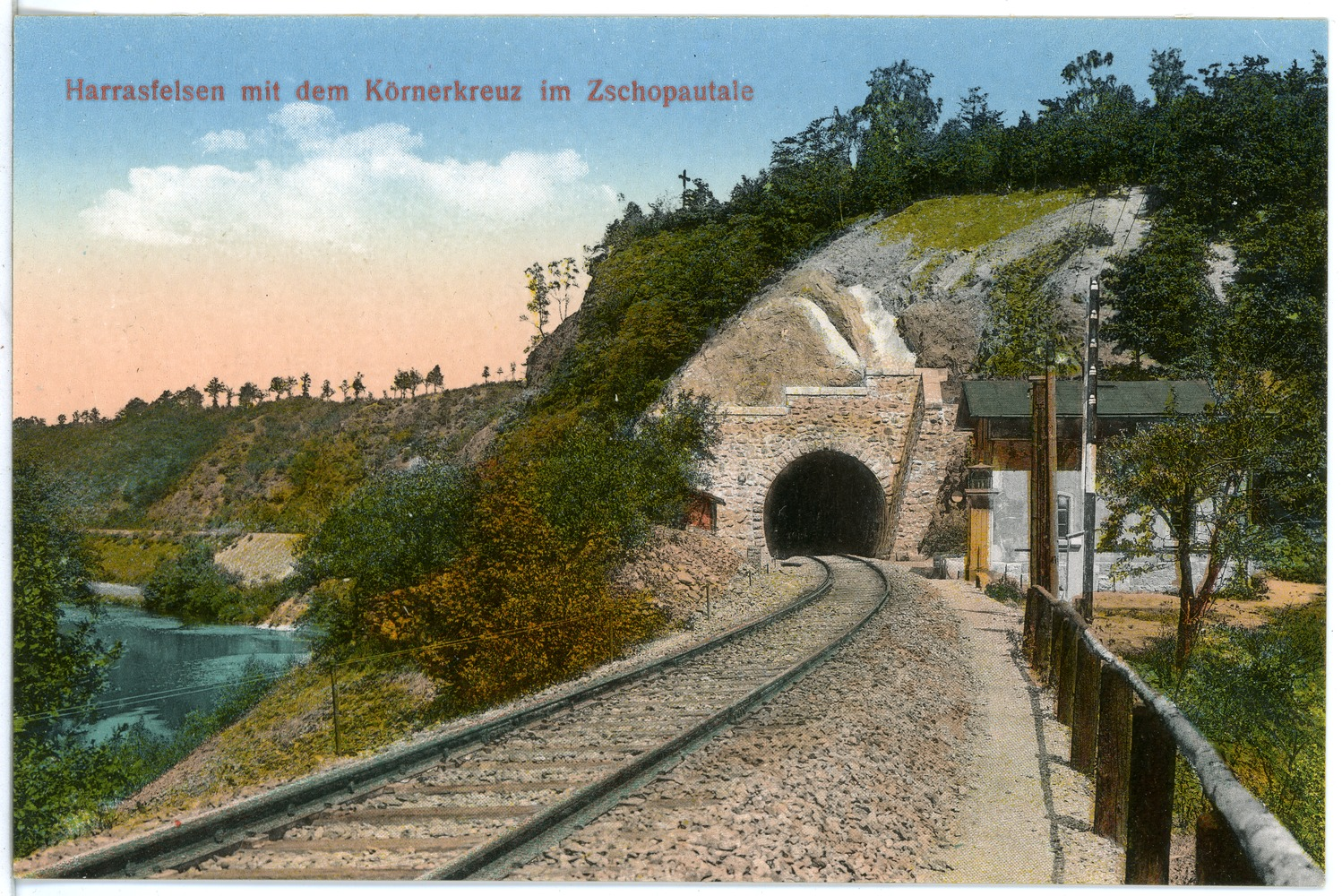
Harras Tunnel on a postcard appr. in 1915

The Harass (or Harrassprung—"Haras’ leap", referring to the legend of a leap on horseback off the rocks into the river said to have been made by Dietrich von Harras in 1449) tunnel runs through the Harass rocks (Harrasfelsen) between Braunsdorf and Frankenberg. It was the site of a serious railway accident on 14 December 1913. During a winter storm, about 100 m³ of rock broke away from the Harass rocks and blocked the southern exit of the tunnel. Shortly after 22.15, a passenger train from Frankenberg to Niederwiesa ran into the debris. The accident claimed 10 dead and 53 wounded and is still regarded as the worst rail disaster in Saxony.

Saxony cancelled passenger services between Roßwein and Hainichen on 24 May 1998. Freight traffic on this section was also closed on 1 January 2000. The Federal Railway Authority (Eisenbahn-Bundesamt) approved the closure of the Hainichen–Roßwein section on 11 July 2001 and it was completed on 30 September 2001. In August 2002, during the most severe flood in Saxony, bridges on this section were completely destroyed and parts of the track were washed away by the flow of the Striegis. The reconstruction and reopening of the line is therefore out of the question.

In October 2002, the whole line was leased to Regio Infra Service Sachsen. After several years of renovation, the City-Bahn Chemnitz reopened the Niederwiesa–Hainichen section on 11 December 2004. As part of the renovation, the old Frankenberg (Sachs) Süd halt was abandoned and replaced by a newly established halt of the same name about 800 metres closer to the centre of Frankenberg, near the Auf dem Wind housing estate. Two services an hour run on the line on weekdays and on Saturdays and Sundays services run every two hours. Services are operated using a Regio-Shuttle diesel railcar.

== Railtrail ==
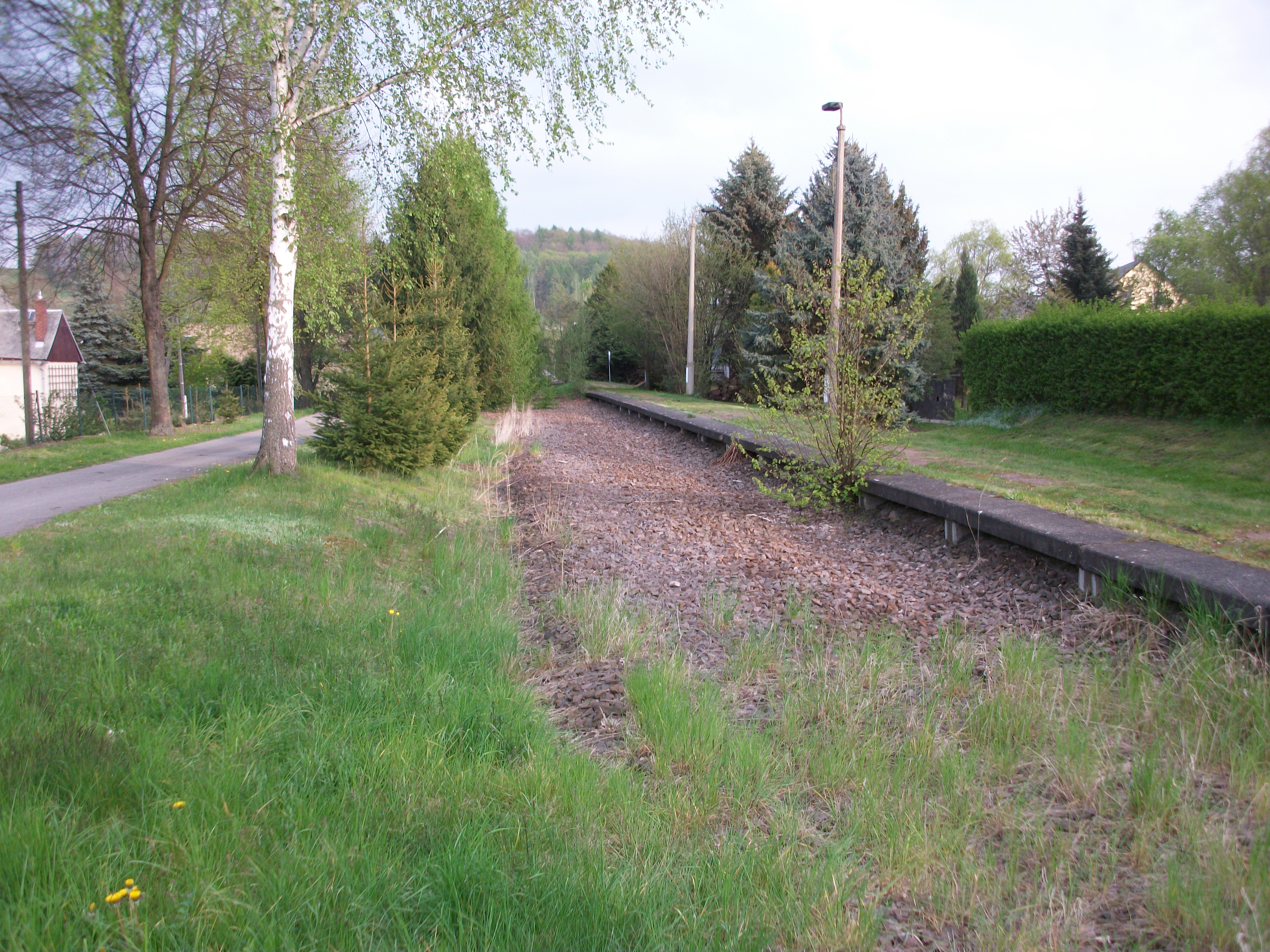
Abandoned track at former Grunau station (May 2017)

The lower section between Hainichen and Roßwein, however, remains unused. In 2005, it was abandoned by Regio Infra Service Sachsen and the city of Hainichen decided to dismantle the tracks in order to build a cycle path on the route.
