= Neusörnewitz station =

Railway station in Coswig, Germany

Neusörnewitz
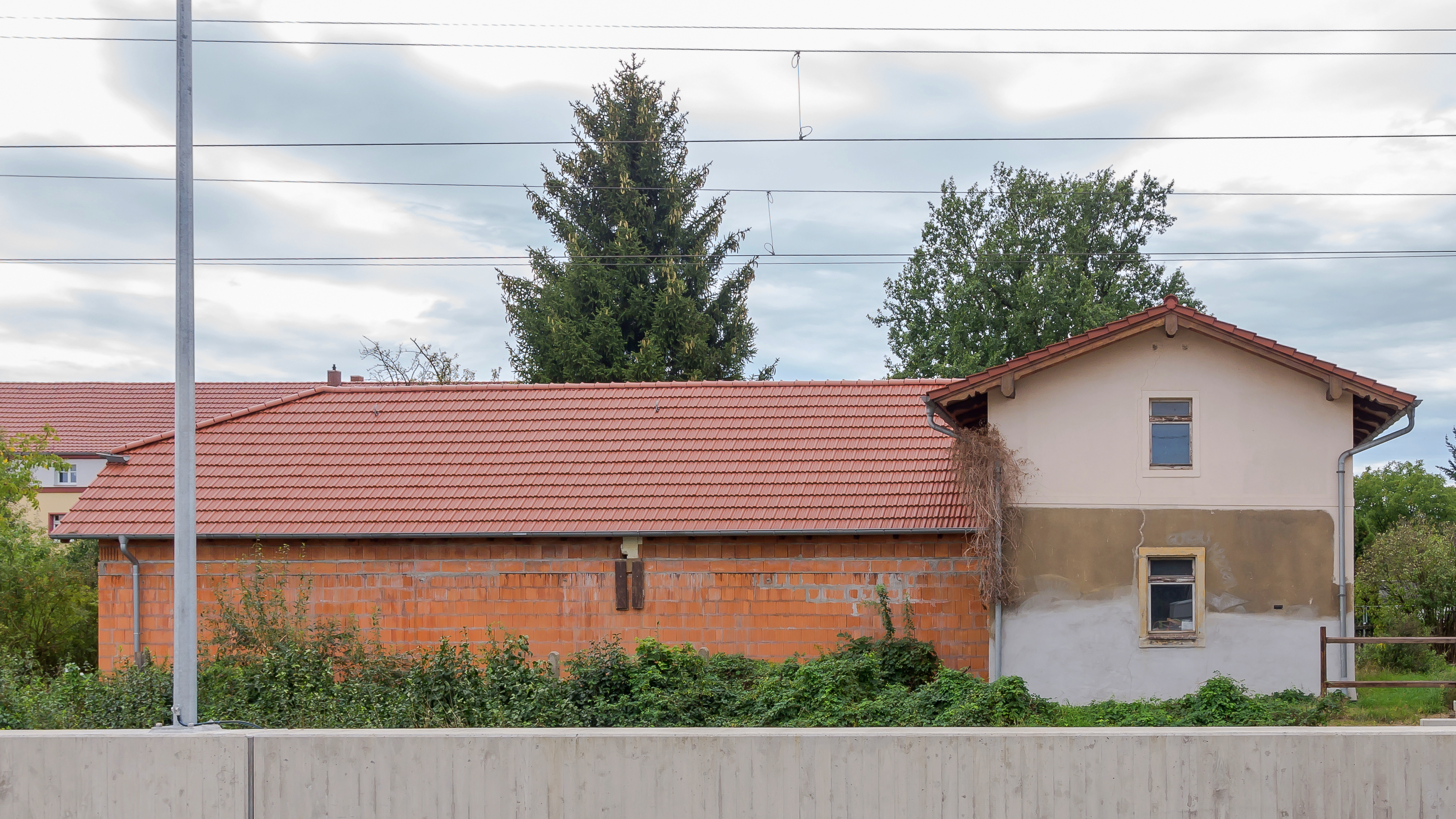

General information
- Location: Sörnewitzer Straße 1; 01689 Weinböhla, Saxony; Germany
- Coordinates: 51.1476°N 13.5527°E
- Operator: DB Station&Service
- Line: Borsdorf–Coswig railway
- Platforms: 2
- Tracks: 2
- Train operators: DB Regio Südost

Other information
- Station code: 4438
- DS100 code: DNZ
- IBNR: 8012471
- Category: 6
- Website: www.bahnhof.de

History
- Opened: 1 December 1860

Services
Preceding station	Dresden S-Bahn	Following station
Meißen towards Meißen Triebischtal	S 1	Coswig (b Dresden) towards Schöna
Location

Neusörnewitz station (German: Bahnhof Neusörnewitz) is a railway station named after the nearby village of Neusörnewitz, part of Coswig, Saxony, Germany. Platform 1 is located in Coswig (Gemarkung Neusörnewitz), platform 2 in Weinböhla, though.

The station lies on the Borsdorf–Coswig railway, passenger services are operated by DB Regio Südost and are part of Dresden S-Bahn network.
