= Niederau =

- Municipality
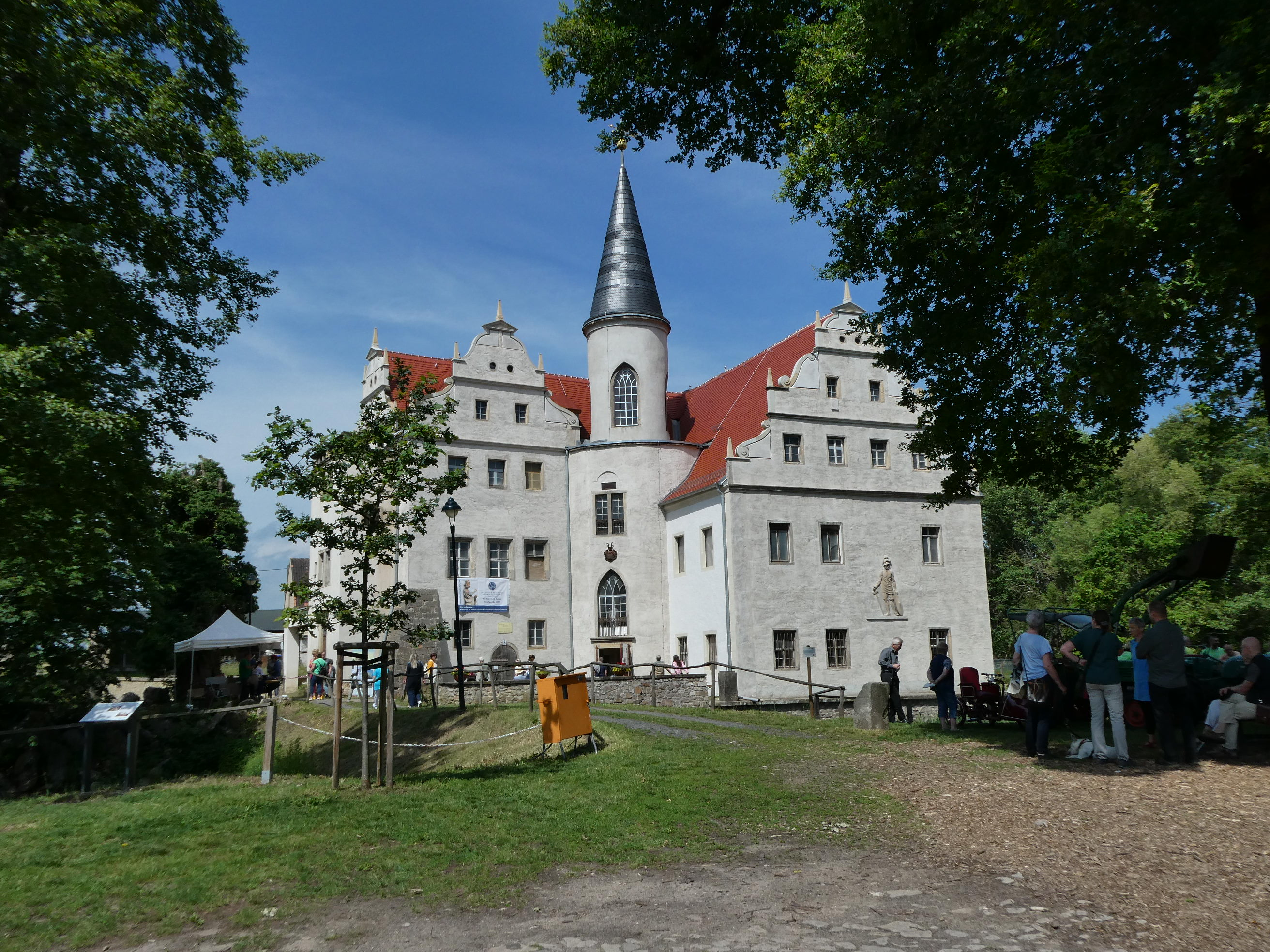
- Oberau Castle

- Coat of arms

- Location of Niederau within Meissen district
- Interactive map of Niederau
- Location within Germany Location within Saxony
- Coordinates: 51°10′32″N 13°32′33″E
- Country: Germany
- State: Saxony
- District: Meissen
- Subdivisions: 7

Government
  - Mayor (2022–29): Thomas Claus

Area
  - Total: 35.21 km^{2} (13.59 sq mi)
- Elevation: 117 m (384 ft)

Population (2025-12-31)
  - Total: 4,050
  - Density: 115/km^{2} (298/sq mi)
- Time zone: UTC+01:00 (CET)
  - Summer (DST): UTC+02:00 (CEST)
- Postal codes: 01689
- Dialling codes: 035243
- Vehicle registration: MEI, GRH, RG, RIE

Niederau is a municipality in the district of Meißen, in Saxony, Germany.

Niederau station is located on the Leipzig–Dresden railway, which also used to have Oberau Tunnel until 1933, which was located within today's municipality Niederau.
