= Schirmbach =

River in Germany

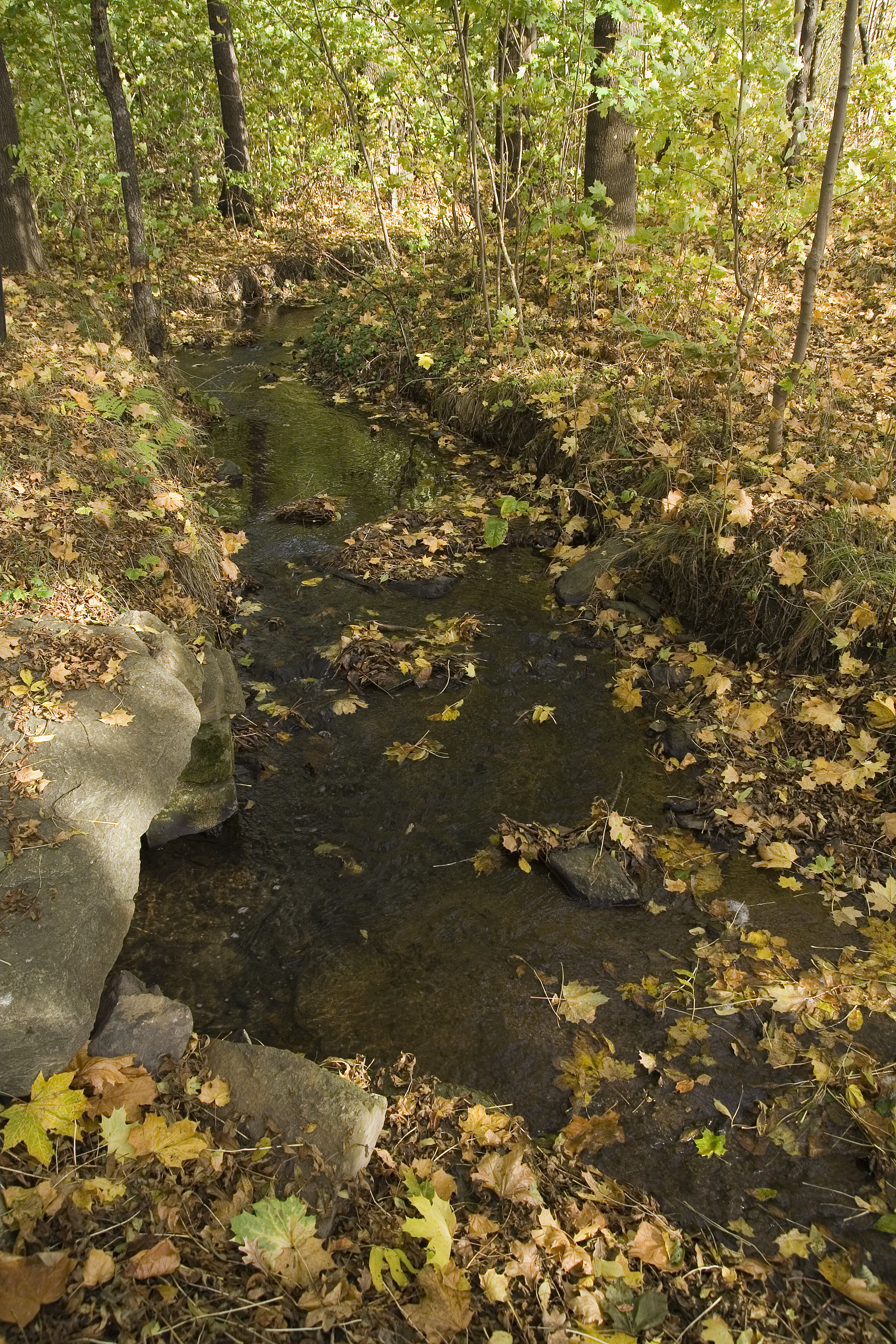

Location
- Country: Germany
- States: Saxony

Physical characteristics
- Mouth
  - location: Striegis
  - coordinates: 50°55′10″N 13°14′45″E

Basin features
- Progression: Striegis→ Freiberger Mulde→ Mulde→ Elbe→ North Sea

The Schirmbach is a small river of Saxony, Germany. It flows into the Striegis in Wegefarth.

== See also ==
- List of rivers of Saxony
