= Meißen Altstadt station =

Railway station in central Meißen, Saxony, Germany

Meißen Altstadt
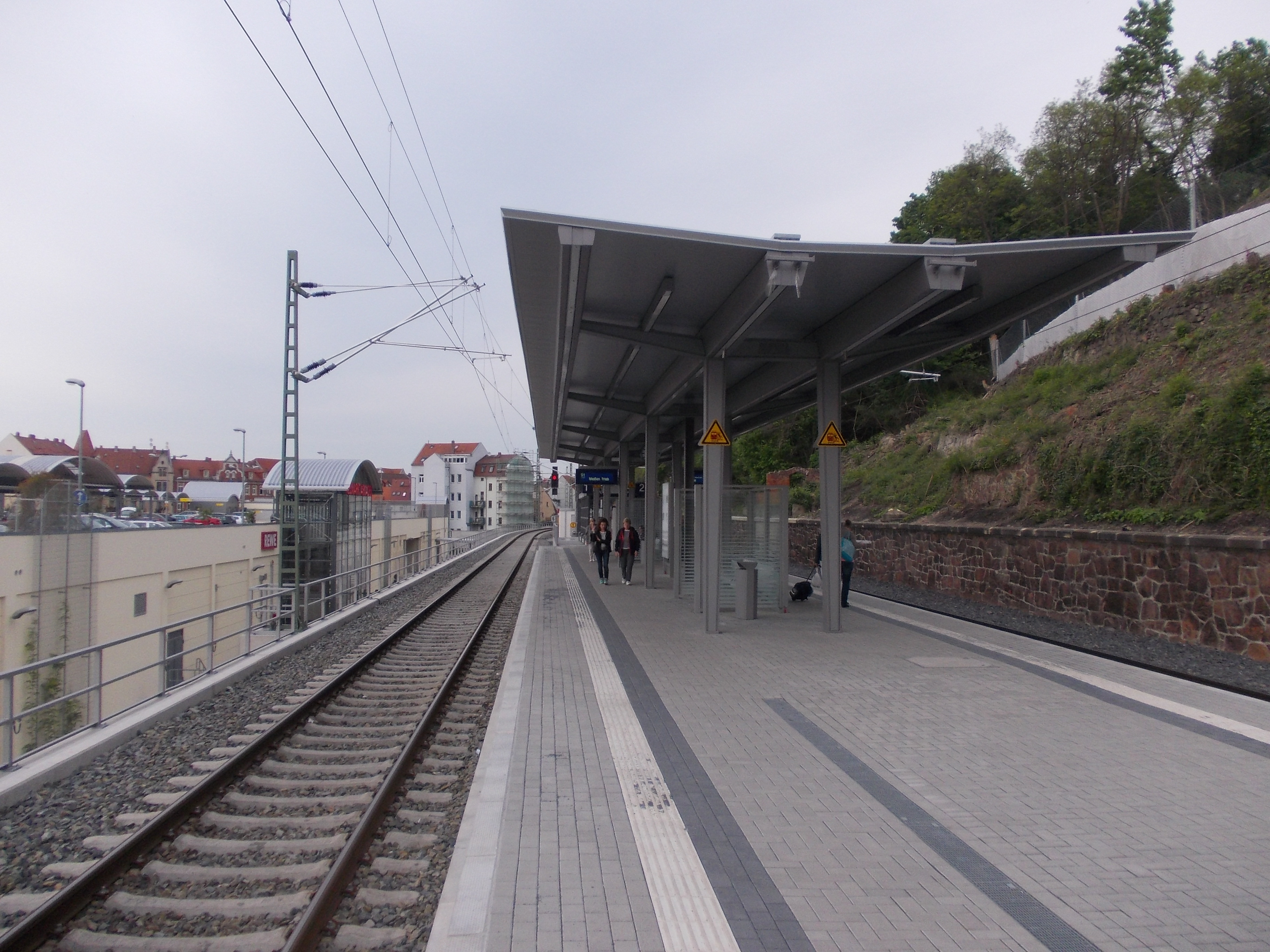

General information
- Location: Neumarkt 5; 01662 Meissen, Saxony; Germany
- Coordinates: 51.1589°N 13.4729°E
- Owner: DB Netz
- Operator: DB Station&Service
- Line: Borsdorf–Coswig railway
- Platforms: 1 island platform
- Tracks: 2
- Train operators: S-Bahn Dresden

Other information
- Station code: 8277
- DS100 code: DMEA
- IBNR: 8012318
- Category: 5
- Website: www.bahnhof.de

History
- Opened: 30 November 2013; 12 years ago

Services
| Preceding station | Dresden S-Bahn | Following station |
|---|---|---|
| Meißen Triebischtal Terminus | S 1 | Meißen towards Schöna |
Location

Meißen Altstadt station (German: Bahnhof Meißen Altstadt) is a railway station in the town of Meissen, Saxony, Germany. The station lies on the Borsdorf–Coswig railway.
