= Nikolaus von Schönberg =

German Catholic prelate (1472–1537)

His Eminence Nikolaus von Schönberg
- Archbishop of Capua
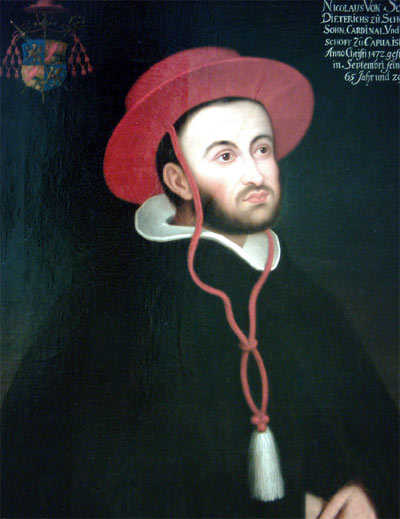
- Archdiocese: Capua
- Appointed: 12 September 1520
- Term ended: 28 April 1536
- Predecessor: Ippolito d'Este
- Successor: Tommaso Caracciolo
- Other posts: Cardinal-Priest of San Sisto (1537); Archbishop Emeritus of Capua (1536–1537)

Orders
- Created cardinal: 21 May 1535 by Pope Paul III
- Rank: Cardinal-priest

Personal details
- Born: 11 August 1472 Rothschönberg, Electorate of Saxony
- Died: 7 September 1537 (aged 65) Rome, Papal States

Nikolaus von Schönberg (11 August 1472 – 7 September 1537) was a German Catholic cardinal and Archbishop of Capua.

== Biography ==
Born in Rothschönberg (now part of Klipphausen) near Meissen to a noble family which already had several Bishops of Meissen, Nikolaus became Canon at the Cathedral of Naumburg (as would later his brothers Hans and Dietrich) and became a doctor of law (Dr. jur.) when studying in Italy.

Impressed by the speeches held by Savonarola in Pisa in 1495, Schönberg became a priest in 1497 and a member of the Ordo Praedicatorum (Dominican Order) on 31 October 1498. In Florence he promoted to Dr. theol., but also studied mathematics, astronomy, medicine and geography. Speaking several languages, and serving his order, he travelled around Europe, to Jerusalem and the Ottoman Empire before settling in Rome in 1508 to serve Pope Julius II. As professor at the Sapienza in Rome, he held speeches that were published in 1512.

George, Duke of Saxony, made Schönberg his procurator for the Fifth Council of the Lateran (1512–1517). Pope Leo X sent him as papal legate around Europe to find support for a crusade against the Ottoman Turks.

Other missions sent him to Maximilian I, Holy Roman Emperor, at Innsbruck, to the courts of Hungary, Poland, Muscovy, and to the Grand Master of the Teutonic Knights, Albert of Brandenburg. In 1891 this mission was the subject of a doctoral thesis in Greifswald.

On 12 September 1520, Schönberg was appointed Archbishop of Capua by Pope Leo X, and on 21 May 1535 elevated to Cardinal by Pope Paul III. On 28 April 1536 he resigned from his office at age 63.

On 1 November 1536, Schönberg wrote a "Letter to Copernicus" from Rome, which Copernicus made famous by including it in De revolutionibus orbium coelestium:

Nicholas Schönberg, Cardinal of Capua,
to Nicolaus Copernicus, Greetings.

Some years ago word reached me concerning your proficiency, of which everybody constantly spoke. At that time I began to have a very high regard for you, and also to congratulate our contemporaries among whom you enjoyed such great prestige. For I had learned that you had not merely mastered the discoveries of the ancient astronomers uncommonly well but had also formulated a new cosmology. In it you maintain that the earth moves; that the sun occupies the lowest, and thus the central, place in the universe; that the eighth heaven remain perpetually motionless and fixed; and that, together with the elements included in its sphere, the moon, situated between the heavens of Mars and Venus, revolves around the sun in the period of a year. I have also learned that you have written an exposition of this whole system of astronomy, and have computed the planetary motions and set them down in tables, to the greatest admiration of all. Therefore with the utmost earnestness I entreat you, most learned sir, unless I inconvenience you, to communicate this discovery of yours to scholars, and at the earliest possible moment to send me your writings on the sphere of the universe together with the tables and whatever else you have that is relevant to this subject. Moreover, I have instructed Theodoric of Reden to have everything copied in your quarters at my expense and dispatched to me. If you gratify my desire in this matter, you will see that you are dealing with a man who is zealous for your reputation and eager to do justice to so fine a talent. Farewell.

Rome, 1 November 1536

Schönberg died in Rome on 7 September 1537.
