= Niederau station =

Railway station in Niederau, Germany

Niederau
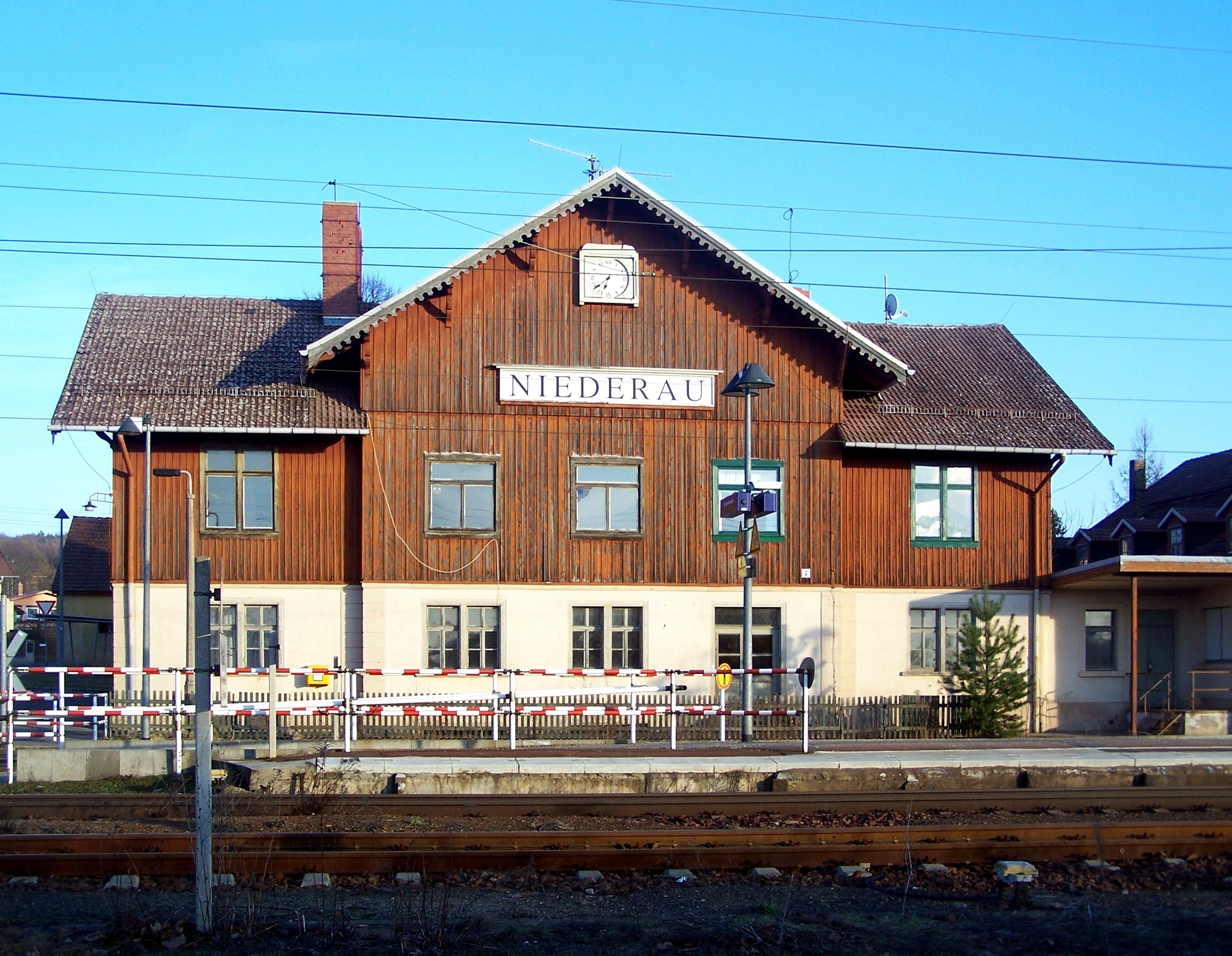
- Entrance building

General information
- Location: Bahnhofsplatz 1, Niederau, Saxony; Germany
- Coordinates: 51°10′35″N 13°33′38″E
- Line: Leipzig–Dresden railway (km 95.69)
- Platforms: 2

Construction
- Accessible: No, low platform

Other information
- Station code: 4482
- DS100 code: DNDR
- IBNR: 8012482
- Category: 6
- Website: www.bahnhof.de

History
- Opened: 15 May 1842

Services
Preceding station	DB Regio Nordost	Following station
Weinböhla towards Dresden Hbf	RB 31	Priestewitz towards Elsterwerda-Biehla
Preceding station	DB Regio Südost	Following station
Priestewitz towards Leipzig Hbf	RE 50	Weinböhla towards Dresden Hbf
Location

Niederau station is a regional station on the Leipzig–Dresden railway in Niederau in the German state of Saxony. The railway station, which was opened on 15 May 1842, for a long time had the oldest operating station building in Germany, but Deutsche Bahn stopped using it and sold it after 2000.

== History ==
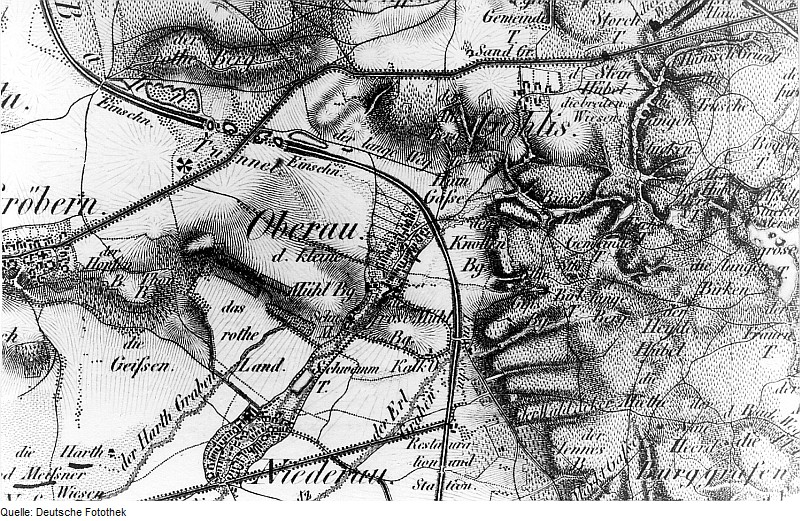
At the bottom of this section of a map, the straight road runs from Meissen to Niederau station

After the opening of the Leipzig-Dresden Railway on 7 April 1839, Oberau station was the closest station to Meissen, but the inconvenient location of the station high above a cutting on the approach to Oberau Tunnel, made access difficult and so Meissen sought easier access to the line. These efforts were successful: the new Niederau station was completed on 1 April 1842 after half a year of construction and the station was opened on 15 May 1842. Simultaneously, a new direct access road was built from Meissen to Niederau, now called Niederauer or Meissner Strasse.

For a while the traffic brought by carriage from Meissen made the station competitive for trains to Leipzig or Dresden with the Coswig–Meißen branch line, which opened on 1 December 1860 and allowed direct rail journeys from Meissen to Dresden. A line was completed from Borsdorf to Meissen in December 1868, creating a direct rail link between Meissen and Leipzig. Thus Niederau station lost its importance and traffic fell sharply.

Freight operations in Niederau were abandoned on 1 July 1964.

In 1988, one year before the celebration of the 150th anniversary of the first German long-distance railway between Leipzig and Dresden, the station was completely restored. At that time, the station building was the oldest on the network of Deutsche Reichsbahn

In the early 2000s, Deutsche Bahn sold the railway station building. It is now used as a residence.

The modular building of an electronic interlocking (ESTW-A) has been located on the eastern side of the line to the south of the former station building since 2000. This is operated from the electronic control centre (ESTW-Z) in Priestewitz.

=== Regional services ===
The station is served by Regional-Express service RE 50, running between Leipzig and Dresden and Regionalbahn service RB 31, running between Elsterwerda-Biehla and Dresden (as of December 2014).

Line	Route	Frequency (min)	Operator
RE 50; Saxonia	Dresden Hbf – Dresden-Neustadt – Radebeul Ost – Coswig (b Dresden) – Niederau – Priestewitz – Riesa – Oschatz – Wurzen – Leipzig Hbf	60	DB Regio Südost
RB 31	Elsterwerda-Biehla – Elsterwerda – Großenhain Cottbus – Priestewitz – Niederau – Coswig (b Dresden) – Cossebaude – Dresden Hbf	120	DB Regio Nordost

== Infrastructure ==
The peculiar two-part main station building is a result of its construction and usage history. The larger part, lying on the left as seen from the tracks, was built as a Restaurationsgebäude (restaurant building), while the building on the right was built as the station building. Later, they were both rebuilt in the Swiss chalet style. The building complex is a heritage-listed building.

=== Entrance building (originally restaurant building) ===
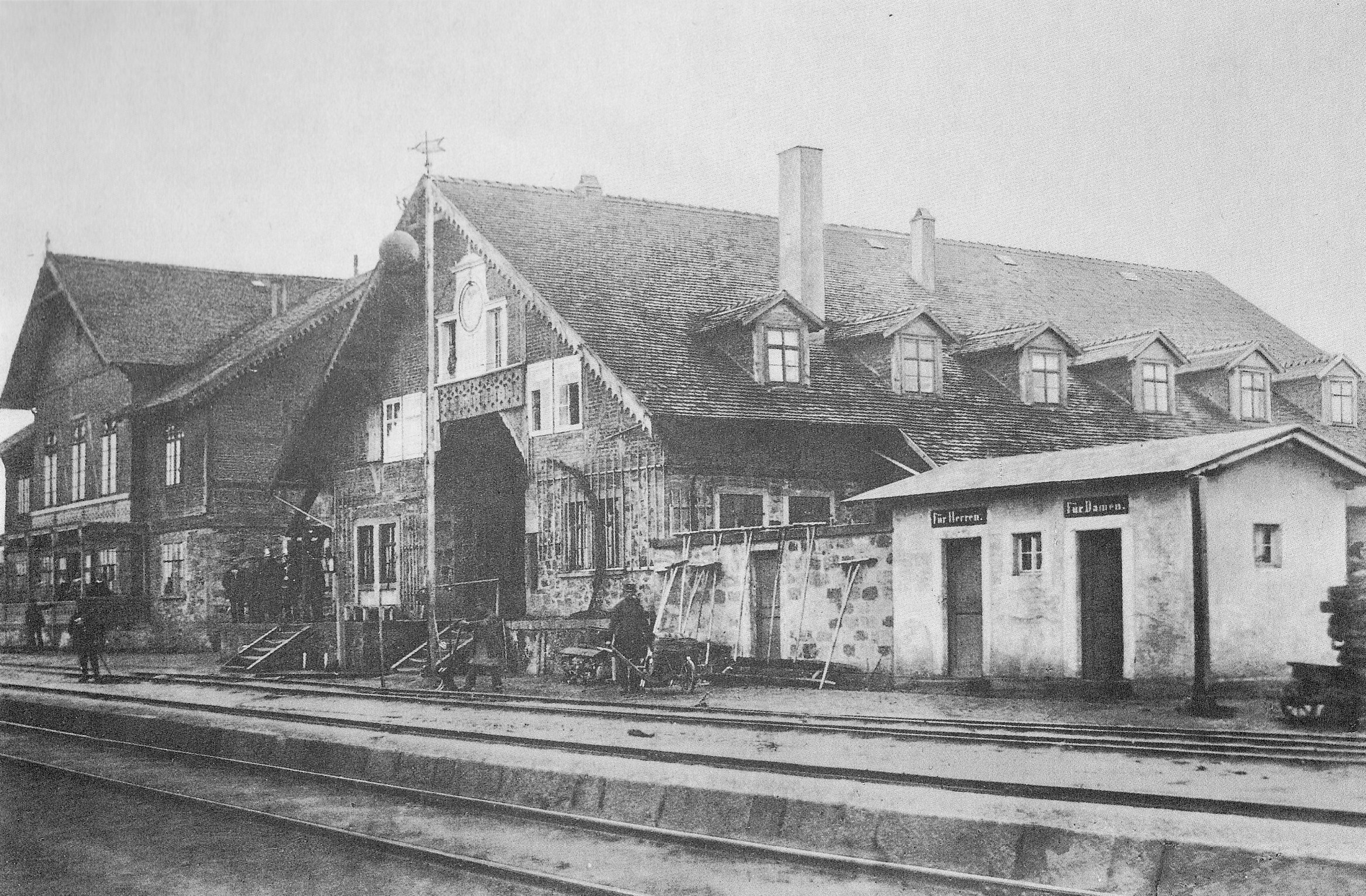
Niederau station from the track side, seen around 1860

Baroness von Werther, the owner of Oberau Castle, built the building and operated it at first as an inn. The half-timbered building was given a wood sheathing in 1862 and it was plastered with the appearance of Cyclopean masonry 15 years later. Also in 1877, the premises of the officials' apartments were renovated and a station restaurant was built in the new rooms. Subsequently the building was used both for residential and station purposes. To emphasize the latter function, it received a station clock and the station sign that broke up the previously empty space on the building's gable during a reorganisation in 1988.
