= Triebischtal =

- Ortsteil of Klipphausen
- Interactive map of Triebischtal
- Location within Germany Location within Saxony
- Coordinates: 51°5′N 13°25′E
- Country: Germany
- State: Saxony
- District: Meißen
- Municipality: Klipphausen
- Subdivisions: 20

Area
  - Total: 49.90 km^{2} (19.27 sq mi)
- Elevation: 320 m (1,050 ft)

Population (2011-12-31)
  - Total: 4,258
  - Density: 85.33/km^{2} (221.0/sq mi)
- Time zone: UTC+01:00 (CET)
  - Summer (DST): UTC+02:00 (CEST)
- Postal codes: 01665
- Dialling codes: 035244
- Vehicle registration: MEI, GRH, RG, RIE
- Website: www.gemeinde-triebischtal.de

Triebischtal is a former municipality in the district of Meißen, in Saxony, Germany. On 1 July 2012, it merged into the municipality of Klipphausen.

== Geography ==
The municipality was situated in the Triebisch valley, from which it took its name , and in the surrounding hills. It lay in the middle of the eastern foothills of the Ore Mountains , between the Eastern Ore Mountains and the Lommatzsch region .

Neighboring municipalities were Reinsberg, Käbschütztal, Klipphausen, Meißen, Nossen and Wilsdruff .

Before its dissolution, the municipality of Triebischtal consisted of 20 villages. The municipal administration was located in the village of Miltitz.

- Burkhardswalde
- Garsebach
- Groitzsch
- Kettewitz
- Kobitzsch
- Miltitz
- Munzig
- Perne
- Piskowitz
- Robschütz
- Roitzschen
- Rothschönberg
- Schmiedewalde
- Seeligstadt
- Semmelsberg
- Sönitz
- Tanneberg
- Taubenheim
- Ullendorf
- Weitzschen

== Background ==
Triebischtal was formed on 1 March 1994 through the merger of the three municipalities of Burkhardswalde-Munzig, Garsebach and Miltitz. Tanneberg was added on 1 January 1999 and Taubenheim followed on 1 November 2003.

In 2011, the municipalities of Triebischtal and Klipphausen agreed to voluntarily merge into a larger municipality. The main reasons for the merger were the improved financial situation of the municipalities and the "merger bonus" paid by the Free State of Saxony, which amounts to a payment of €100 per inhabitant for the first 5,000 inhabitants of a voluntary municipal merger. The merger took effect on July 1, 2012.

Detailed overview of the incorporations of the following places:

Former municipality	Date	note
Alttanneberg	July 1, 1910	Merger with Neutanneberg to form Tanneberg
Burkhardswalde	January 1, 1973	Merger with Munzig to form Burkhardswalde-Munzig
Burkhardswalde-Munzig	March 1, 1994	
Garsebach	March 1, 1994	
Groitzsch	July 1, 1950	Incorporation into Burkhardswalde
Kettewitz	April 1, 1938	Incorporation into Sönitz
Kobitzsch	April 1, 1937	Incorporation into Ullendorf
Miltitz	March 1, 1994	
Munzig	January 1, 1973	Merger with Burkhardswalde to form Burkhardswalde-Munzig
Neutanneberg	July 1, 1910	Merger with Alttanneberg to form Tanneberg
Piskowitz	April 1, 1938	Incorporation into Sönitz
Robschütz	July 1, 1950	Incorporation into Garsebach
Roitzschen	November 1, 1935	Incorporation into Miltitz
Roitzschwiese	1925	Municipal transfer of Robschütz to Roitzschen
Rothschönberg	January 1, 1973	Incorporation into Tanneberg
Schmiedewalde	July 1, 1950	Incorporation into Burkhardswalde
Seeligstadt	July 1, 1950	Incorporation into Taubenheim
Semmelsberg	April 1, 1939	Incorporation into Garsebach
Sönitz	January 1, 1974	Incorporation into Taubenheim
Tanneberg	January 1, 1999	
Taubenheim	November 1, 2003	
Ullendorf	July 1, 1950	Incorporation into Taubenheim
Weitzschen	April 1, 1938	Incorporation into Sönitz

link=https://de.wikipedia.org/wiki/Datei:Triebischtal.jpg|thumb|Coat of Arms

== Population ==
(As of December 31)

Territorial status as of January 1, 2004 (including Taubenheim)

Year	Resident
1998	3360
1999	3376
2000	3350
2001	3362
2002	3331
2003	4722
2004	4706
2007	4529
2008	4453
2009	4393

== Traffic ==
The A4 motorway runs through the southern part of the former municipality ; in this area, it was rerouted from the Tanneberger Loch to the plateau in 1999. It can be accessed via the Wilsdruff interchange. The A14, running southwest, can be reached via the Nossen-Ost interchange. The Borsdorf–Coswig railway line also runs through the municipality .
