= Meißen Triebischtal station =

Railway station in Meissen, Germany

Meißen Triebischtal
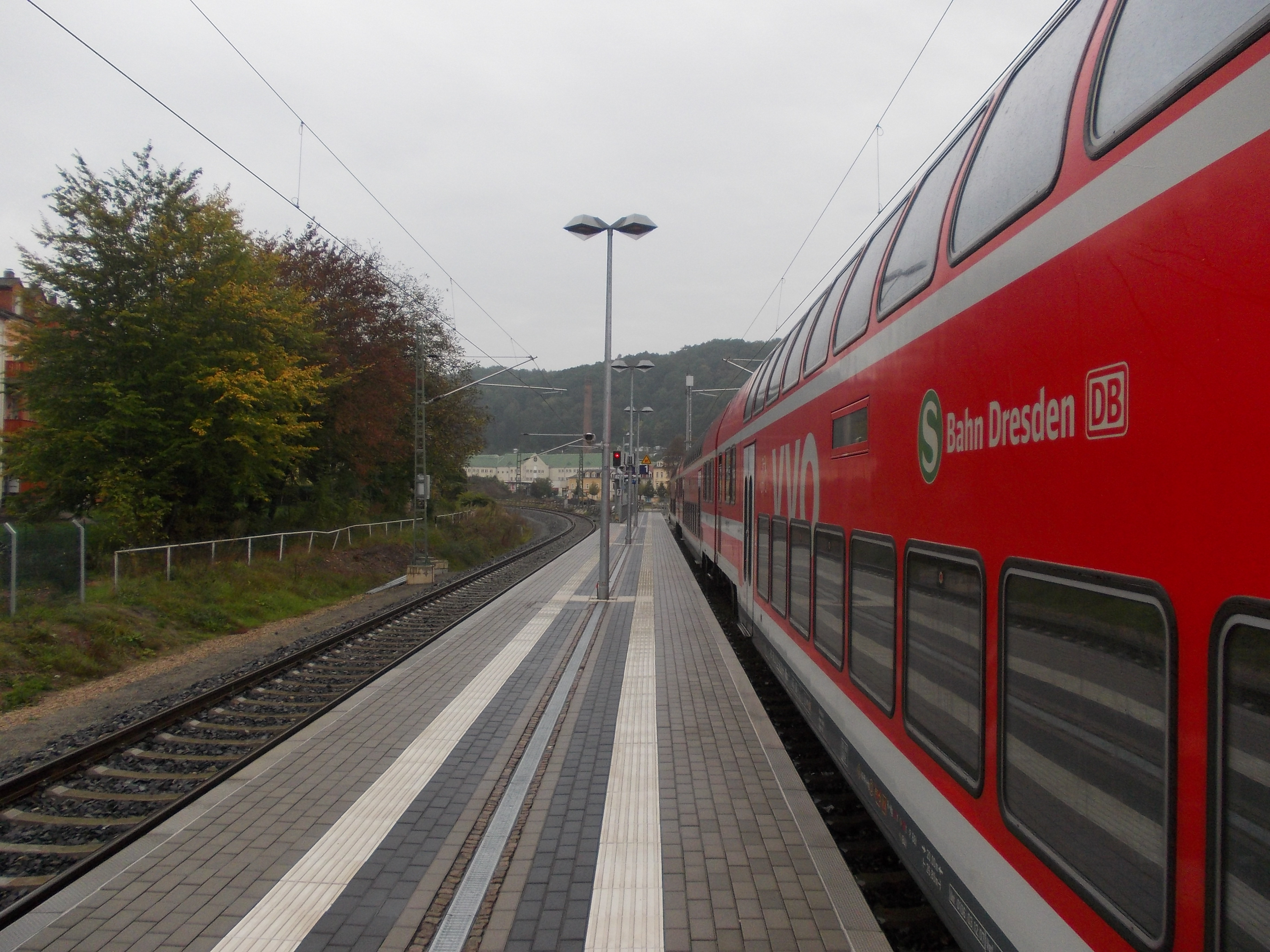

General information
- Location: Hirschbergstr. 30; 01666 Meissen, Saxony; Germany
- Coordinates: 51.1523°N 13.4621°E
- Owner: DB InfraGO
- Operator: DB InfraGO
- Line: Borsdorf–Coswig railway
- Platforms: 1 island platform
- Tracks: 2
- Train operators: S-Bahn Dresden

Other information
- Station code: 4037
- DS100 code: DMT
- IBNR: 8012327
- Category: 4
- Website: www.bahnhof.de

History
- Opened: 1 October 1878; 147 years ago

Services
Preceding station	Dresden S-Bahn	Following station
Terminus	S 1	Meißen Altstadt towards Schöna
Location

Meißen Triebischtal station (German: Bahnhof Meißen Triebischtal) is a railway station that was founded by DB Netz in 1878 in the town of Meissen, Saxony, Germany. The station lies on the Borsdorf–Coswig railway and has two tracks and an island platform.
