= Striegis =

River in Germany

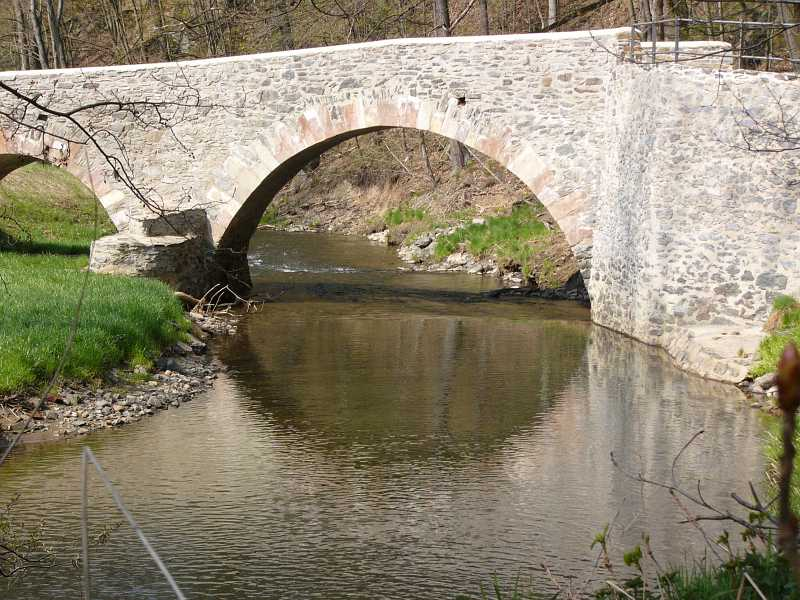

Location
- Country: Germany
- State: Saxony

Physical characteristics
- Source
  - location: 50°49′13″N, 13°17′53″E
  - elevation: Approximately 546 meters above sea level
- Mouth
  - location: 51°4′38″N, 13°9′5″E (Freiberger Mulde)
  - coordinates: 51.0773°N 13.1513°E
  - elevation: 181 meters above sea level
- Length: 48.1 km, of which 11 km are called "Striegis"

Basin features
- Progression: Freiberger Mulde→ Mulde→ Elbe→ North Sea
- River system: Elbe
- Tributaries
  - left: Kleine Striegis
  - right: Schirmbach

The Striegis (German pronunciation: [ˈʃtʁiːɡɪs]) is a river of Saxony, Germany. It is a left tributary of the Freiberger Mulde, which it joins in Niederstriegis.

== See also ==
- List of rivers of Saxony
