= Niederstriegis =

- Ortsteil of Roßwein
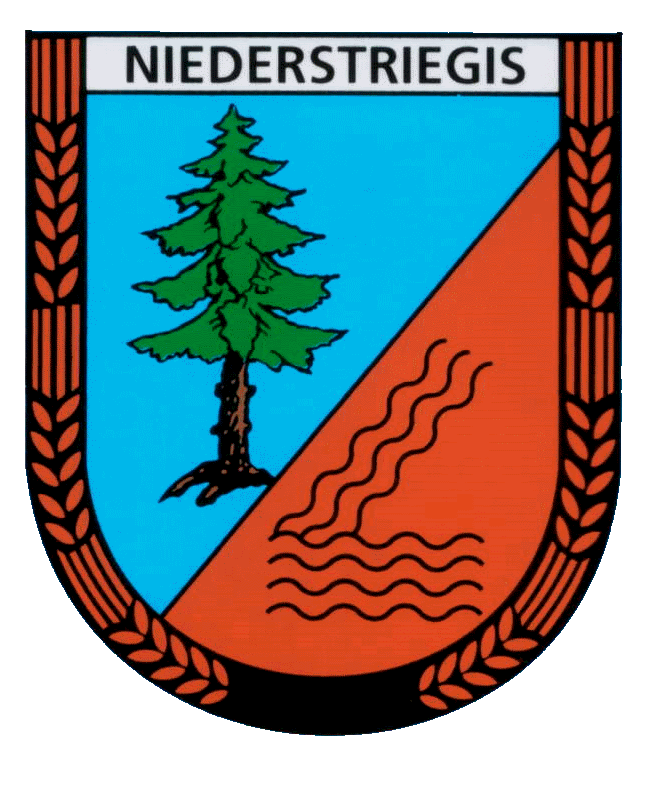
- Coat of arms
- Interactive map of Niederstriegis
- Location within Germany Location within Saxony
- Coordinates: 51°5′1″N 13°8′58″E
- Country: Germany
- State: Saxony
- District: Mittelsachsen
- Town: Roßwein

Area
  - Total: 14.73 km^{2} (5.69 sq mi)
- Elevation: 249 m (817 ft)

Population (2011-12-31)
  - Total: 1,184
  - Density: 80.38/km^{2} (208.2/sq mi)
- Time zone: UTC+01:00 (CET)
  - Summer (DST): UTC+02:00 (CEST)
- Postal codes: 04741
- Dialling codes: 03431
- Vehicle registration: FG
- Website: www.niederstriegis.de

Niederstriegis is a former municipality in the district of Mittelsachsen, in Saxony, Germany. With effect from 1 January 2013, it has been incorporated into the town of Roßwein.

== History ==
In 1338, a Petrus de Streguz is first mentioned in a document; in 1350, he is called Petrus de Strigus, indicating that the village already existed around this time. The name comes from the Striegis River, on which the village is situated. The original meaning of the river's name is not entirely clear; it is either Sorbian or of older Indo-European origin.

== Geography ==
Niederstriegis is located about 7.5 kilometers southeast of the town of Döbeln and five kilometers west of the old town of Roßwein at the confluence of the Striegis and the Freiberger Mulde.
