= Triebisch =

River in Germany

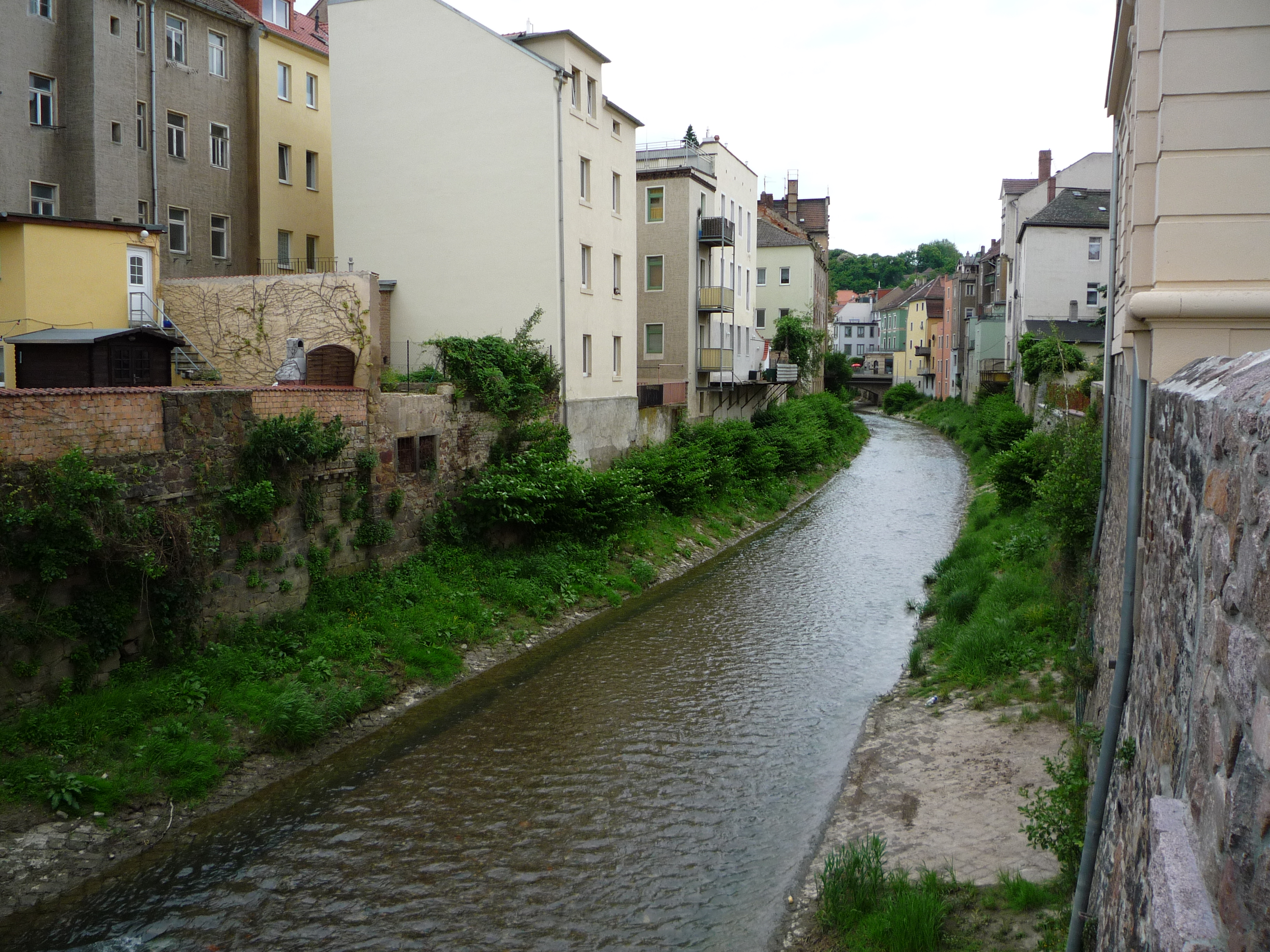

Location
- Country: Germany
- State: Saxony

Physical characteristics
- Mouth
  - location: Elbe
  - coordinates: 51.1636°N 13.4763°E

Basin features
- Progression: Elbe→ North Sea

The Triebisch is a 27-kilometer-long river in Saxony, Germany. It is a left tributary of the Elbe, which it joins in Meißen.

== See also ==
- List of rivers of Saxony
