= Borsdorf–Coswig railway =

Railway line in Germany

Borsdorf (Saxony)–Coswig

Overview
- Line number: 6386
- Locale: Saxony, Germany

Service
- Route number: 241.1, 506

Technical
- Line length: 102.649 km (63.783 mi)
- Number of tracks: 2: Meißen Altstadt–Coswig junction B
- Track gauge: 1,435 mm (4 ft 8 1/2 in) standard gauge
- Minimum radius: 285 m (935 ft)
- Electrification: 15 kV/16.7 Hz AC overhead catenary (only Meißen Triebischtal–Coswig (b Dresden) section)
- Operating speed: 100 km/h (62.1 mph) (maximum)
- Maximum incline: 1.1%

The Borsdorf–Coswig railway is a mainline railway in the German state of Saxony, originally built and operated by the Leipzig-Dresden Railway Company. It runs mostly along the Freiberger Mulde from Borsdorf via Döbeln and Meißen to Coswig near Dresden. It is part of a long-distance connection from Leipzig to Dresden, but is now used for local traffic only.

== History ==
Meißen had been linked since 1 December 1860 to the Leipzig–Dresden railway by a branch line from Coswig. On 7 July 1864 the Leipzig–Dresden Railway Company (German: Leipzig-Dresdner Eisenbahn-Compagnie submitted an application to build a second rail link between Leipzig and Dresden. It provided for a route along the Freiberger Mulde from Döbeln to Meißen to connect with the existing branch line from Coswig. On 16 January 1866 the company was granted a concession for the construction of the line. Work began on 4 August 1865 near Borsdorf. The line was opened as follows:

- 14 May 1866: Borsdorf–Grimma
- 27 October 1867: Grimma–Leisnig
- 2 June 1868: Leisnig–Döbeln
- 25 October 1868: Döbeln–Nossen
- 22 December 1868: Nossen–Meißen

On 1 July 1876, the Leipzig-Dresden Railway Company was nationalized and the line was then controlled by the Royal Saxon State Railways. Between 1898 and 1909, the Borsdorf–Großbothen and Döbeln–Coswig sections were duplicated. Duplication was also later started between Großbothen and Döbeln, but only the Großbothen–Tanndorf section was completed because of the outbreak of the Second World War in 1939.

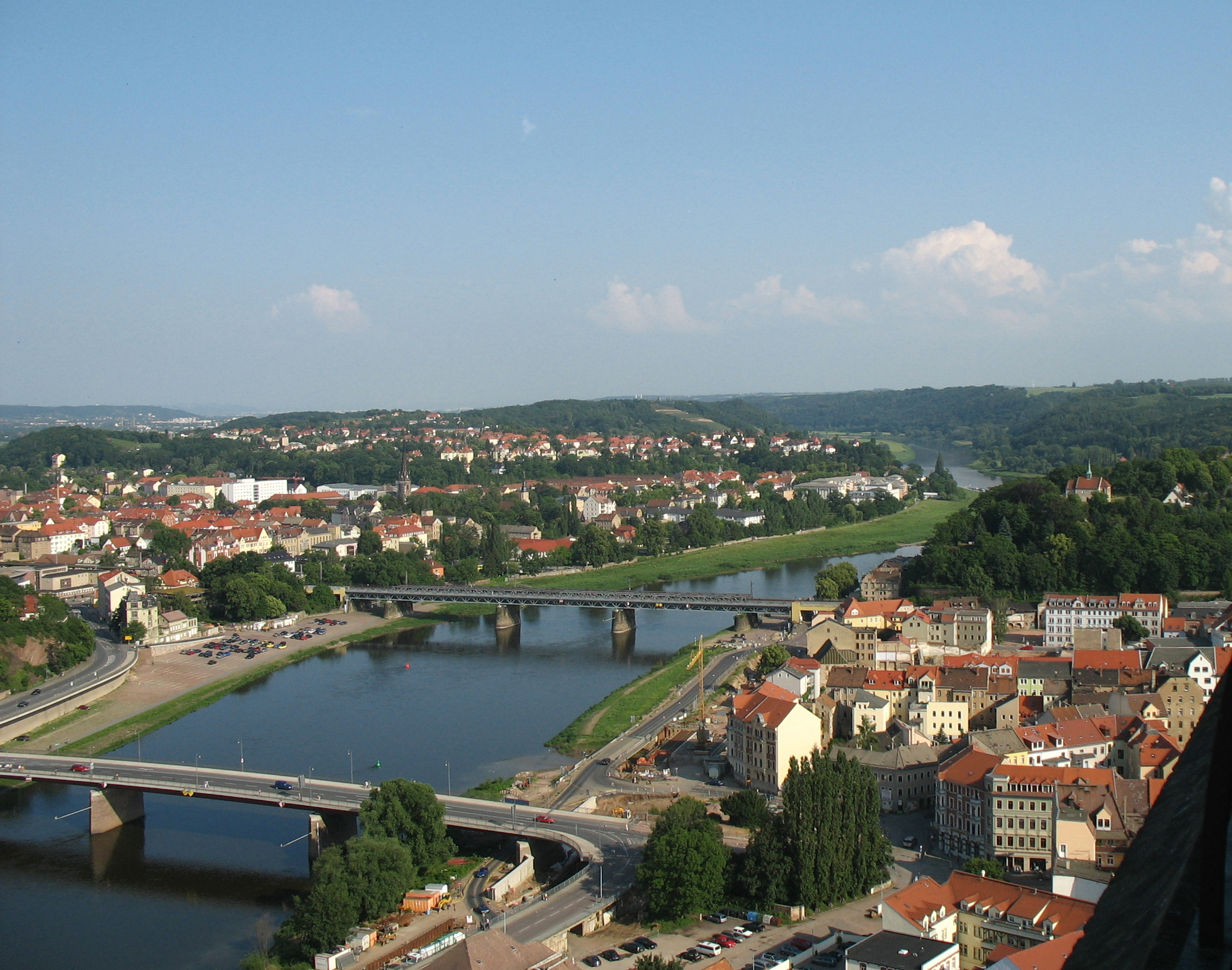
Meißen Elbe bridge (in background)

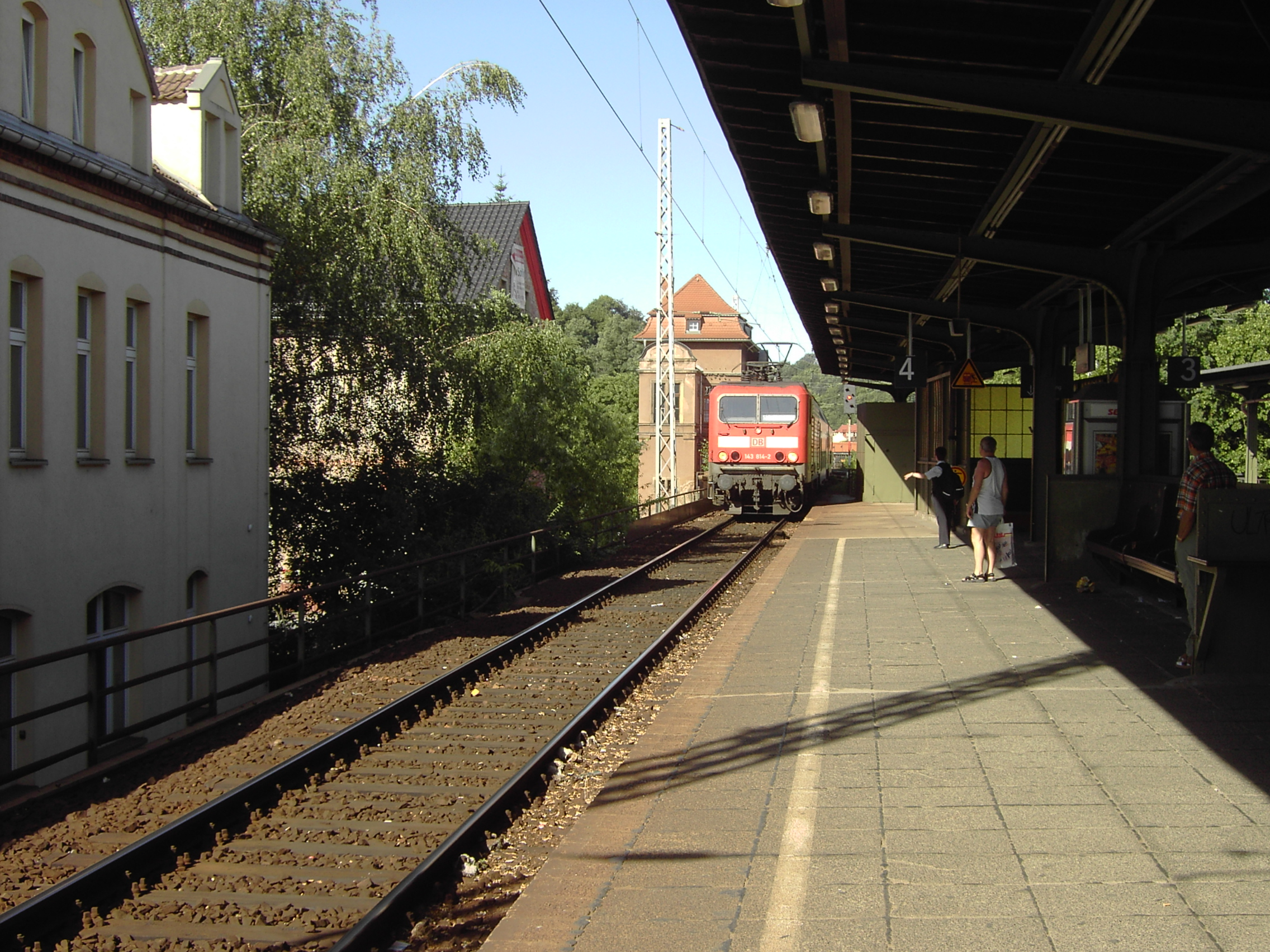
S-Bahn in Meißen

One of the largest construction projects of the interwar period was the rebuilding of the bridge over the Elbe in Meißen. Between 1925 and 1926, the Lauchhammer-Rheinmetall company rebuilt it with a new steel truss superstructure. The bridge escaped demolition in 1945, so the original bridge is now preserved, but it has only had a single track since 1946.

After the Second World War one track of the line was dismantled to provide reparations to the Soviet Union.

In 1970, the Coswig–Meißen Triebischtal section was electrified for Dresden suburban services. On 18 December 1970, electric train operations started. A little later—in September 1973—the section was included in the network of the newly established Dresden S-Bahn. After that all rail services were broken in Meißen, with services operating between Leipzig and Meißen and between Meißen Triebischtal and Dresden, requiring a change of trains. Even express trains on the line only ran between Leipzig and Meißen.

In December 1981, the second track was returned to service between Meißen and Coswig. In 1989, the short Borsdorf–Beucha section was electrified. On 30 September 1989, the electrical equipment on this section was removed.

A completely new situation emerged after the political changes in East Germany in 1989–90. For the first time in decades express trains ran between Leipzig and Dresden via Döbeln. Together with the two S-Bahn services every hour between Leipzig and Meißen there were hourly express services. The Dresden S-Bahn service — now running as line S1 (Meißen Triebischtal–Schöna) — operated after that at continuous 30-minute intervals from Meißen through Coswig to Dresden and Schöna. Only in 2000, with the formation of the transport authorities of the Verkehrsverbund Oberelbe (Upper Elbe Transport Authority) and the Mitteldeutscher Verkehrsverbund (Central Germany Transport Authority), was this timetable abandoned. The express trains, which last ran between Leipzig and Zittau, were cancelled on 9 June 2001.

The line was broken at several points between Großbothen and Coswig during the flood in August 2002. The most serious cases were with damage between Tanndorf and Leisnig. In addition to several smaller damaged areas, a total of 500 metres of track including the railway embankment were completely destroyed at Tanndorf. The line was restored to use on 21 August 2004. According to a town council, the federal government had invested €45 million in the line after the 2002 floods.

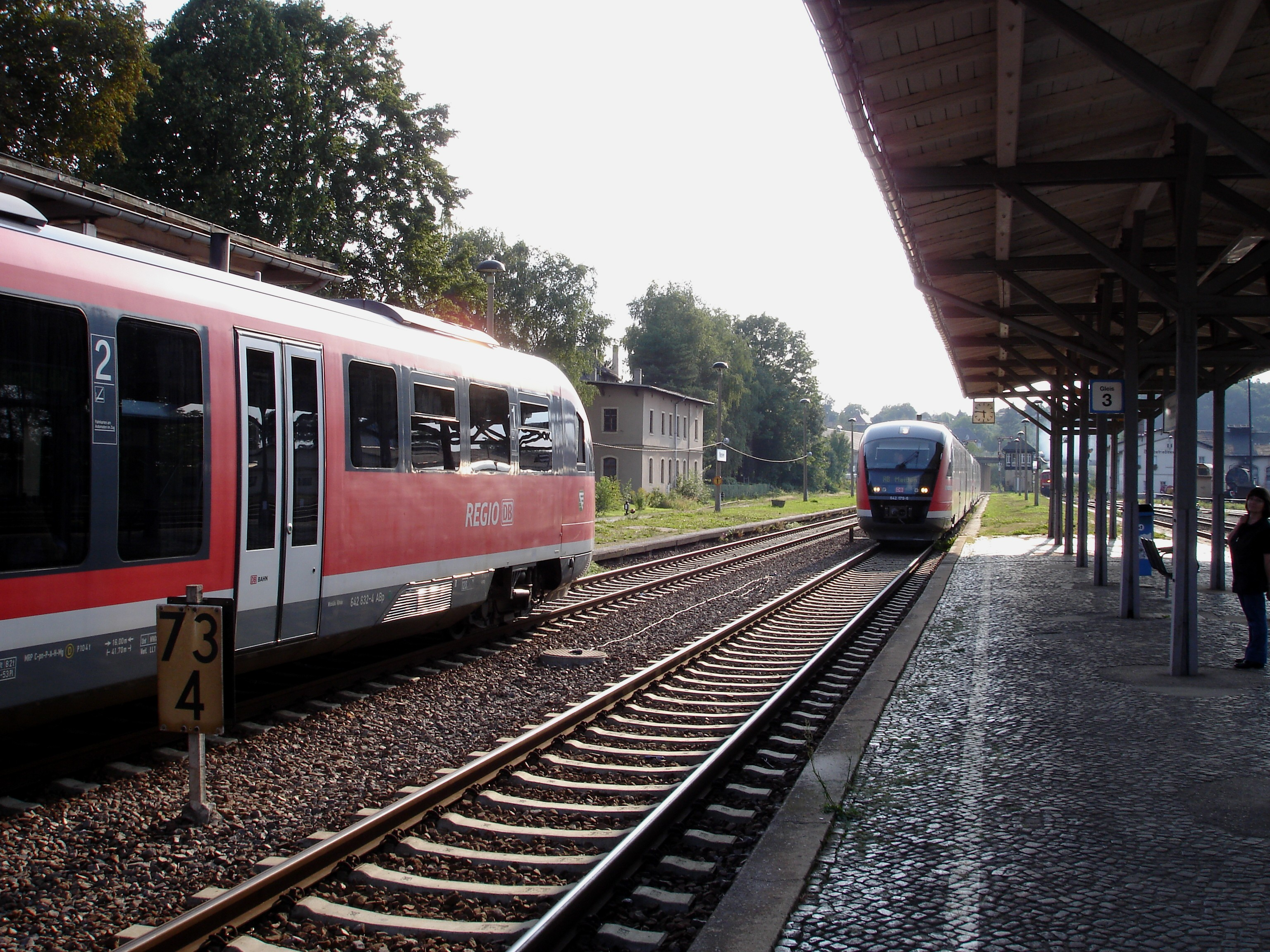
Trains crossing in Nossen

By December 2015, the service consisted of Regionalbahn trains running at two-hour intervals between Leipzig and Meißen, with additional trains providing an hourly services in the morning and afternoon peaks. Outside of the peaks and on the weekend, the hourly service from Leipzig ends in Grimma. Siemens Desiro Classic diesel multiple units are used; at peak times running in double sets. The Symmetry minute of the timetable is between Leipzig and Nossen about three minutes earlier than usual, so that the transfer times of trains running in one direction and trains running in the other direction at crossing points, e.g. in Leipzig, may differ by up to eight minutes. Other trains run on weekdays in the morning and late afternoon in an alternating cycle between Leipzig and Grimma. In freight transport the line does not have much significance any more. This is essentially limited to the operation of the Rhäsa tank farm on the former line to Riesa.

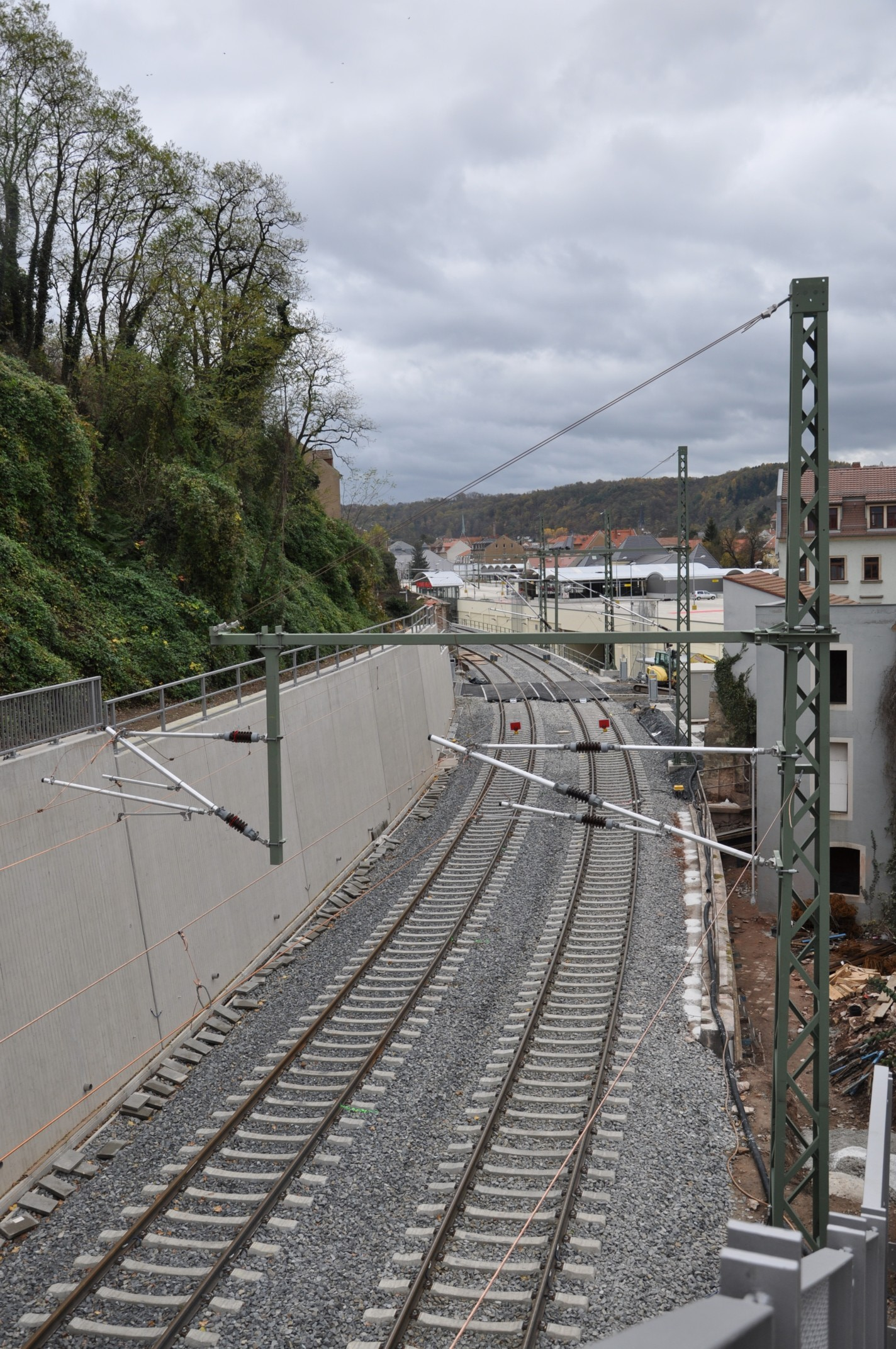
The newly built two-track section between Meißen Altstadt and Meißen (November 2013)

On 2 May 2010, the first construction phase of the electronic interlocking (Elektronischen Stellwerk, ESTW) Mulde Valley (ESTW Muldental) was put into operation with the ESTW-A Großbothen and the ESTW-A Leisnig. They are controlled from the sub-center in Geithain, which has been converted into an ESTW-Z control centre. At the end of July 2012 the connection of the Großsteinberg and Grimma ob Bf stations to the ESTW Muldental was completed. Naunhof station was integrated into the ESTW Muldental at the end of November 2013 after the construction of a second outside platform in the autumn of 2013. On 9 August 2015, Borsdorf-Naunhof was included as the last section of the ESTW with the converted Beucha station.

The Upper Elbe Transport Association (Verkehrsverbund Oberelbe, VVO) has been considering the permanent closure of local rail services between Nossen and Meißen Triebischtal since autumn 2010. A citizens' initiative collected 14,000 signatures to maintain services on the route in 2010. According to the citizens' initiative, more than 1,000 passengers per day were counted on the section of the line in 2001; the count was 400 at the beginning of 2014. Meanwhile, the direct connections to Dresden had been lost and the hourly service had been reduced to a two-hourly service.

On 3 June 2013, the service between Großbothen and Meißen had to be stopped due to a flood. After repairing the damage, train traffic between Döbeln and Meißen Triebischtal was resumed on 8 June 2013.

In 2013, the upgrade of the section used by the S-Bahn Dresden was carried out, which involved blockading of the line between Meißen Triebischtal and Meißen. The new Meißen Altstadt station was built near the centre of Meißen. In addition, the second track was restored in the section between Meißen Altstadt and Meißen. With the completion of the work, the S1 service to Meißen Triebischtal was restored on 30 November 2013.

From November 2013 to mid-2014, the line between Großbothen and Leisnig was interrupted for the reconstruction of the viaduct across a gully near Kössern. On the affected section, there was a substitute bus.

On 28 November 2013, the board of the VVO decided to discontinue the RB 110 passenger service between Meißen and Nossen for economic reasons from December 2015 and replace it with buses. With an average of 13 passengers per train, the section between Nossen and Meißen was among the most vulnerable in the VVO area; since 2012, passenger numbers have continued to decline. With the replacement of the trains by an "optimised bus network", the VVO hoped for a significant reduction in the subsidy requirement. The VVO estimated the cost of maintaining traffic at €1.6 million per year. An investigation of the expansion of the railway services showed that it would have doubled passenger numbers and tripled the subsidies required.

On 7 March 2014, the Verkehrsverbund Mittelsachsen (Mid-Saxon transport association) decided not to run services between Döbeln and Nossen from December 2015 onwards. Recently, 200 to 300 passengers per day had used the trains. The association also decided to establish a new Döbeln Körnerplatz station near the centre of Döbeln. A citizens' initiative had collected 7,000 signatures against the closure plans by March 2014.

On 12 December 2015, the RB 110 service ended on the Meißen Triebischtal–Döbeln section.

== Prospects ==
The Zweckverband für den Nahverkehrsraum Leipzig ("Joint Association for regional transport in the Leipzig area", ZVNL) will continue to procure local rail services between Leipzig and Döbeln. On 17 September 2015, the ZVNL also published a change to the invitation to tender for the Dieselnetz Nordwestsachsen / Teil B ("Diesel network Northwest Saxony/part B"), which covers transports services from 12 June 2016 to 13 December 2025, to include services to Döbeln-Zentrum station. Politicians and citizens advertise in a position paper that the passenger services should be extended to Roßwein instead of Döbeln-Zentrum, as this was possible in the planned working timetable.

In the 1980s the integration of Grimma into the then Leipzig S-Bahn network was planned, but this failed because of the low clearance of the A 14 overbridge. In 2009 the A 14 bridge was rebuilt higher, so the possibility was again considered in 2012. The Saxon Minister of Economic Affairs, Sven Morlok, however, has stated that the integration was not to be expected before 2025.

== New infrastructure operator ==
On 28 June 2013 DB Netz AG offered the 37.1 kilometre section of the line between Döbeln, Nossen and Meißen Triebischtal for sale or rent due to the line's poor returns. According to these figures, it incurred annual infrastructure revenues of around €1.3 million while its costs amounted to €2.3 million (approximately €1.4 million for staff and €0.8 million for maintenance). Between 2014 and 2018, investment of around €24.8 million would also be expected. The sale price was €627,990 (net) and the annual rent was €50,239. DB Netz decided in the middle of 2015 to transfer this section to the Nossen-Riesaer Eisenbahn-Compagnie GmbH ("Nossen-Riesa Railway Company", NRE) as railway infrastructure owner. The company is already a tenant of the Nossen–Riesa and Nossen–Ausschlichstelle Rhäsa (to the Neubodenbach tank farm) sections.

The transfer, which was originally scheduled for 13 December 2015, was delayed until 16 April 2016, after an earlier delay to February 2016, announced in 2015. The NRE intends to operate the Döbeln–Meißen Triebischtal section using the Direct traffic control operating procedure.

== Route description ==
=== Course ===
The line branches off at Borsdorf towards the southeast from the Leipzig–Dresden Railway and runs without sharp curves through agricultural areas. The line then passes through Beucha and the branch to the Beucha-Trebsen railway, which is only used for freight, and under the A14 and goes through the landscape protection area of the Naunhofer Forst (Naunhof forest), while on the eastern side is a recreational area with lakes in old quarries. The line crossed the newly built bypass road B 107n before Grimma, where it reaches the course of the Mulde for the first time. Before Großbothen the northern part of the landscape protection area of the Colditzer Forst (Colditz forest) is crossed, before the 1.5 kilometre-long station operating facilities are reached and federal highway 107 is crossed. The Glauchau–Wurzen railway, which crosses the Borsdorf-Coswig line at the exit from the station and runs parallel for about one kilometre, begins on the north side of the Inselbahnhof ("island" station building, that is, surrounded by rail tracks) before heading south to Colditz. Near Kössern, the line changes for the first time to the north bank of the Mulde, until it changes back to the south near Röda. At the exit from Leisnig station, the line returns to the northern bank and then runs through the landscape protection area of Freiberger Mulde-Zschopau. After about 400 metres, the ruins of the Buch Abbey (Kloster Buch) are passed before the line switches again to the south side of the Freiberger Mulde at the mouth of the Zschopau. Before Döbeln, the line crosses the line from Chemnitz together with federal highway 169.

The line leaves the Keilbahnhof ("wedge station") of Döbeln in a southeastern direction and crosses the southern urban area, while the Riesa line branches off to the northeast. Federal highway 175 is crossed at the station exit. The line crosses the narrowing valley of the Freiberger Mulde several times after Döbeln Zentrum station. After Niederstriegis, the dismantled line of the former Roßwein–Niederwiesa railway approaches and follows the Borsdorf–Coswig railway for about two kilometres to Roßwein station. After crossing and recrossing the Freiberger Mulde, the connecting line from the Rhäsa tank farm approaches from the north and the two lines runs parallel past the Altzella Abbey (Kloster Altzella) and meet the Zellwald railway, which comes from the south, pass under the B 175 and enter Nossen station. The line crosses federal highway 101 at a level crossing and passes along a sloping section and reaches the Meißen highland in the Waldhufendorf ("forest village") of Eula. From Deutschebora, the highest point, the line turns north-east, crosses the A 14 and turns into the landscape protection area of the valley of the Triebisch. From here, it follows the river through the Garsebacher Schweiz ("Garsebach Switzerland") over a length of about 10 kilometres, past the Götterfelsen ("God's rocks"), which rise 60 metres above the valley, to Meißen Triebischtal station, where the wiring for the Dresden S-Bahn begins. After crossing the Elbe together with federal highway 6 and passing through Meißen station, the now two-track line turns south-east, rules through a sparsely built flatland and rejoins the Leipzig–Dresden railway between Weinböhla and Coswig.

=== Operating points ===
Grimma ob Bf (51°13′48″N 12°42′51″E)

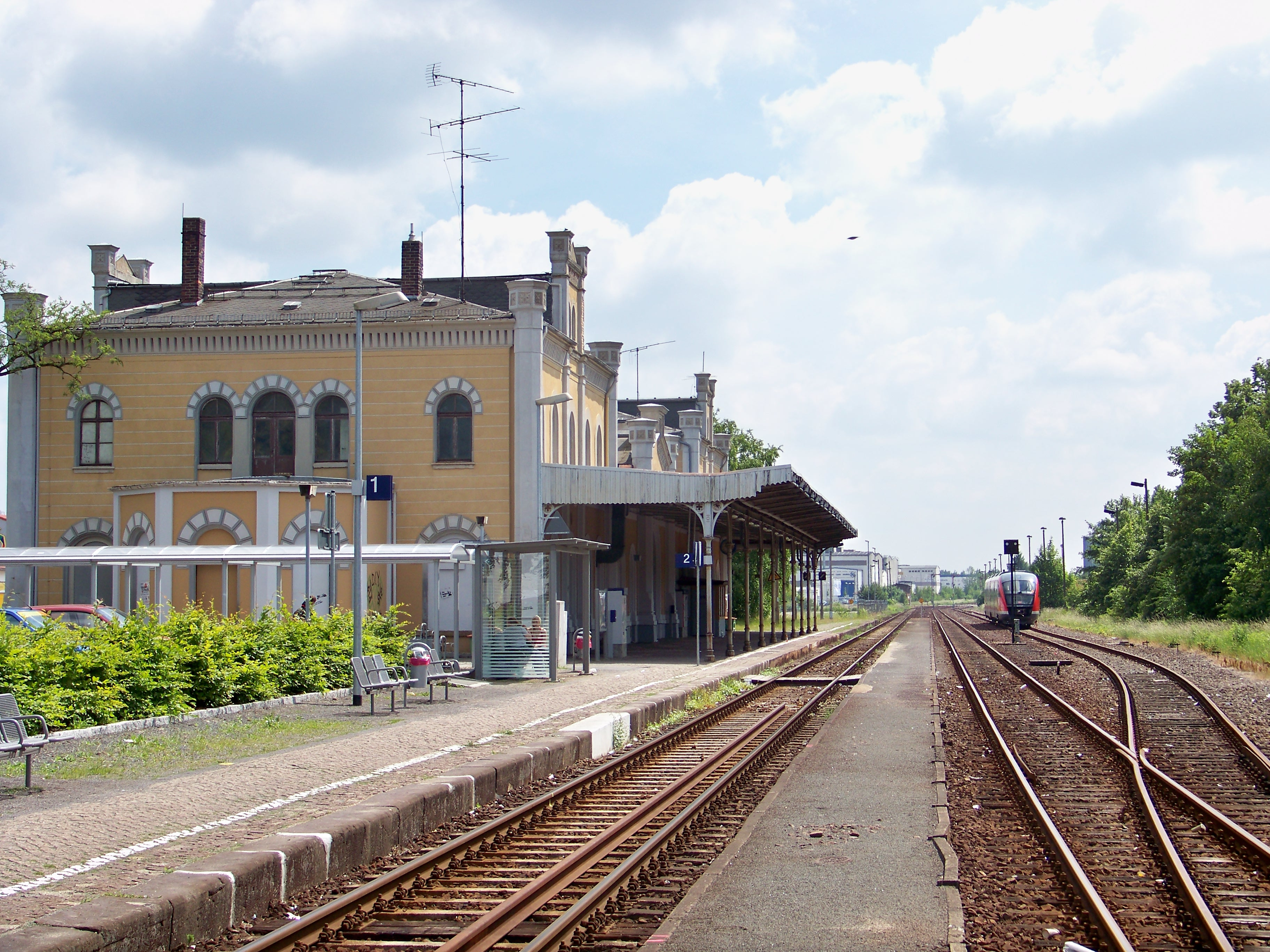
Grimma ob station

Grimma ob Bf was opened on 1 June 1866 with the name Grimma. After the opening of the Großbothen–Wurzen section of the Glauchau–Wurzen railway (Mulde Valley Railway) in 1877, the Grimma station was renamed Grimma ob Bf (short for oberer Bahnhof—"upper station") since the Mulde Valley Railway had a station in the town on the right bank of the Mulde called Grimma unt Bf (short for unterer Bahnhof—"lower station"). With the discontinuation of rail traffic on the Mulde Valley Railway (Grimma unt Bf–Nerchau section) in 1967, Grimma ob Bf is the only railway station in the town.

Großbothen (51°11′03″N 12°45′39″E) } Großbothen station was opened in 1867 with the Grimma–Leisnig section of the Borsdorf–Coswig railway of the Leipzig–Dresden Railway Company. Although the station is in the Kleinbothen area, it was initially planned as the “station for Colditz in Großbothen”. The connection to Colditz was made by stagecoach. With the opening of the Glauchau–Wurzen railway (9 December 1875: Rochlitz–Großbothen section; 30 June 1877: Großbothen–Wurzen section), Großbothen became a railway junction and the entrance building was built as an Inselbahnhof ("island" station building) at that time. On the north side are the tracks of the Glauchau–Wurzen railway and on the south side are the tracks of the Borsdorf–Coswig railway. Already at that time, the Borna–Großbothen railway was planned, although it was only opened in 1937 after a long construction period. After the commissioning of the Borna–Großbothen line, there were four mechanical signal boxess in the station. For the Borsdorf–Coswig line, signal box 1 was located on the western end (towards Borsdorf) and signal box 3, which was also controlled the whole station, was located at the eastern end.

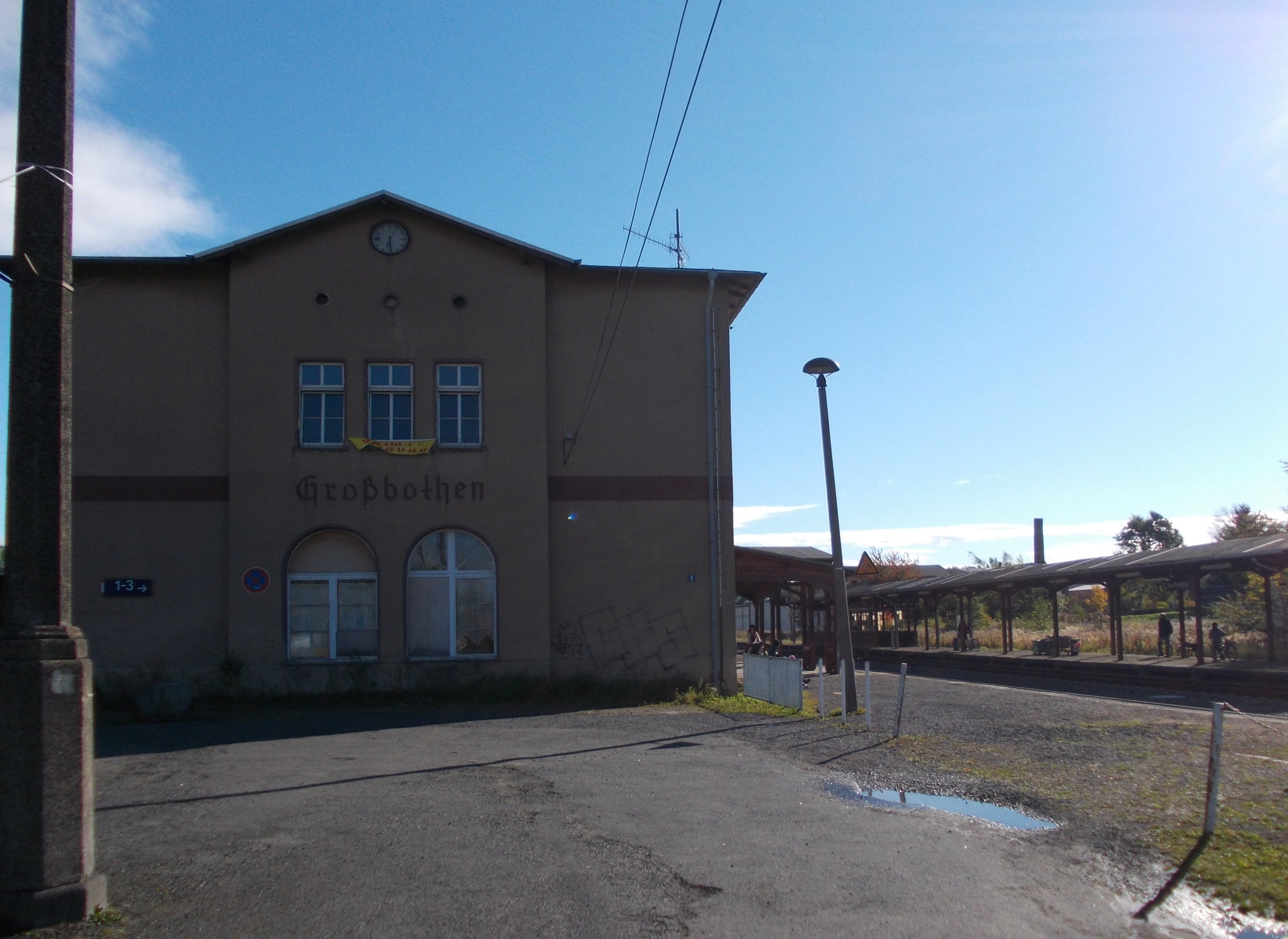
Großbothen station now

After the Second World War, Großbothen lost importance because of a break in the line to Wurzen and the dismantling of the Borna–Großbothen line. Signal box 2 was closed by 1980; the western end on the Mulde Valley Railway side received electrically actuated, remotely controlled points and colour light signals; these were connected to signal box 1. Shortly after 1990, the middle of the three railway platforms of the Mulden Valley Railway was closed. Traffic on the Colditz–Großbothen section of the Mulden Valley Railway was discontinued on 27 May 2000. In the rationalisation of the facilities, in preparation for the construction of the electronic interlocking system, the connections between the Mulde Valley Railway and the Borsdorf–Coswig railway at the eastern end were omitted. Since 2010, an Alcatel electronic signal box has been put into operation; it is controlled from Geithain station. The central platform of the three platforms on the Borsdorf–Coswig side was retained, but the points were locked, which made it no longer usable. Since 2014, there are again three platform faces on the Borsdorf–Coswig line side of the station and one of the tracks leased to the DRE on the Mulde Valley Railway is accessible by train to and from Grimma ob station. Signal box 4 was not included in the electronic signalling and was retained.

Döbeln Hauptbahnhof (51°07′36″N 13°05′42″E)

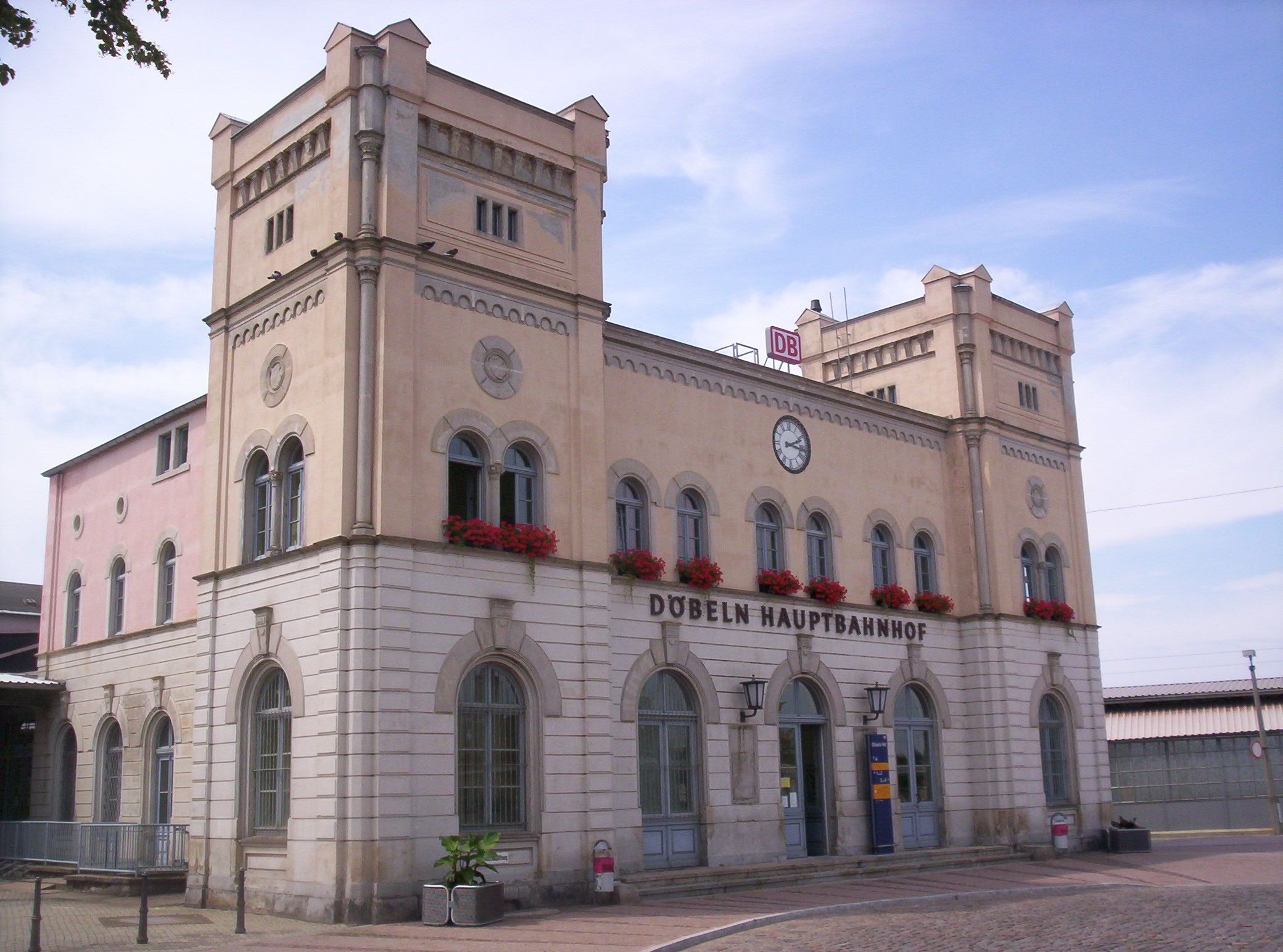
Döbeln Hbf entrance building of 1868

The diesel-worked Borsdorf–Coswig and the electrified Riesa–Chemnitz lines cross in Döbeln Hauptbahnhof. It was opened on 2 June 1868. Sidings on the Coswig line north-east of the Hbf are electrified. The station building of 1868, unchanged to this day, is a heritage listed building. Between 1892 and 1926 the Döbelner Straßenbahn, a horse tramway, ran for two kilometres (1.2 mi) from the station to central Döbeln.

Döbeln Zentrum (51°06′59″N 13°07′29″E)

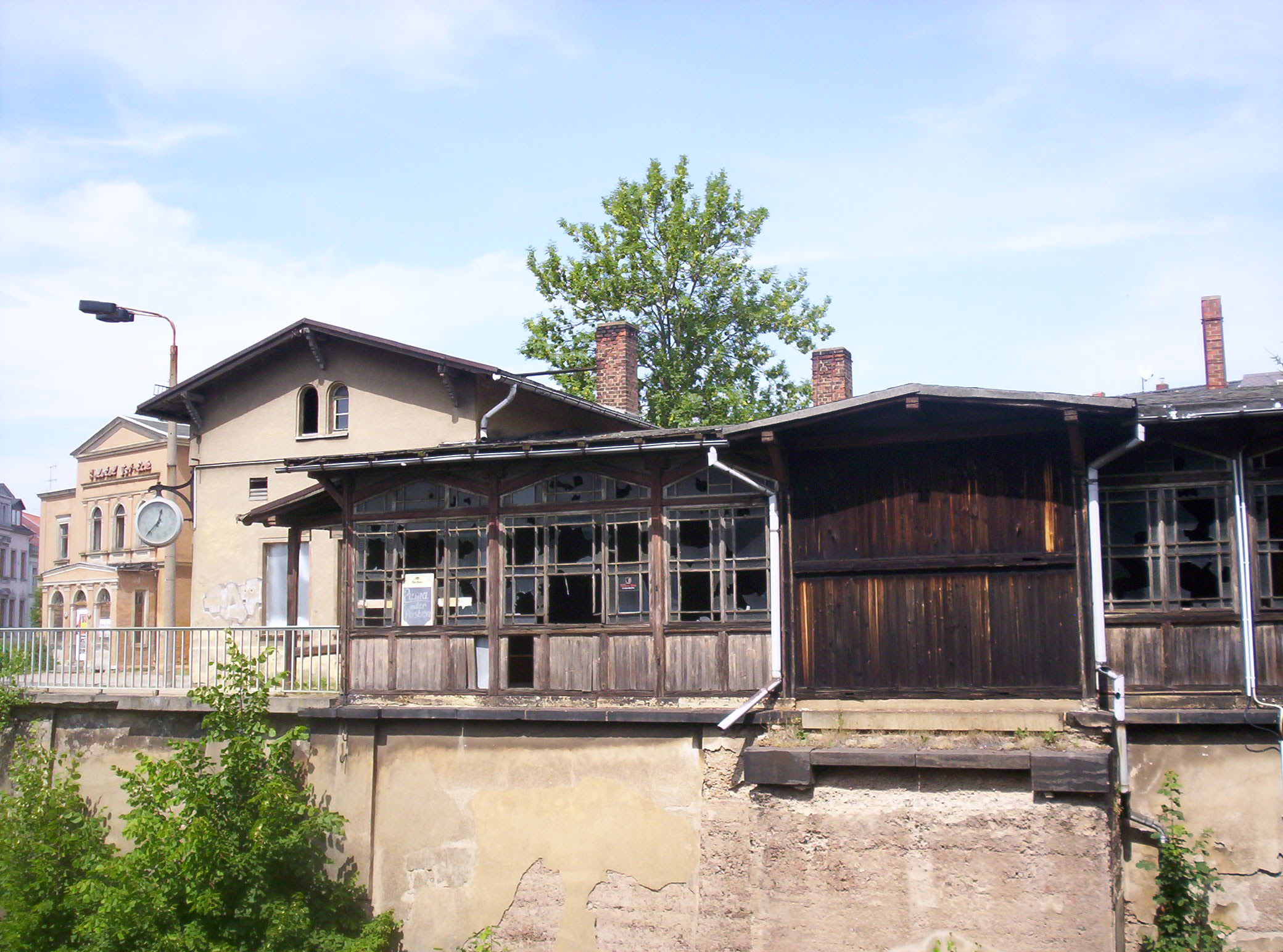
Entrance building of Döbeln Zentrum station

In 1868 the station was opened as Döbeln halt (Haltepunkt) and renamed Döbeln Ost (Döbeln east) in 1905. In the meantime, the halt had been upgraded to a station with local goods facilities for the supply of the local industry. After the dismantling of the second track between Döbeln and Meißen, only the northern platform was used; after the reconstruction of the station buildings in the middle of the 1970s, only the southern platform was used. In the 1990s, the station became a halt again (now meaning that is it has no sets of points). Since 21 August 2004, the station has been called Döbeln Zentrum. The tracks originally ran at street level until 1904, when the line was tunnelled under Roßweiner Straße and the tracks were lowered around six metres. Since the (now unused) station building remained at street level, the platform is only accessible by stairs from the Roßweiner Straße bridge. The abandoned pedestrian bridge from the entrance building to the southern platform was removed as part of the rebuilding of the station superstructure in the 1970s.

Roßwein (51°03′38″N 13°11′07″E)

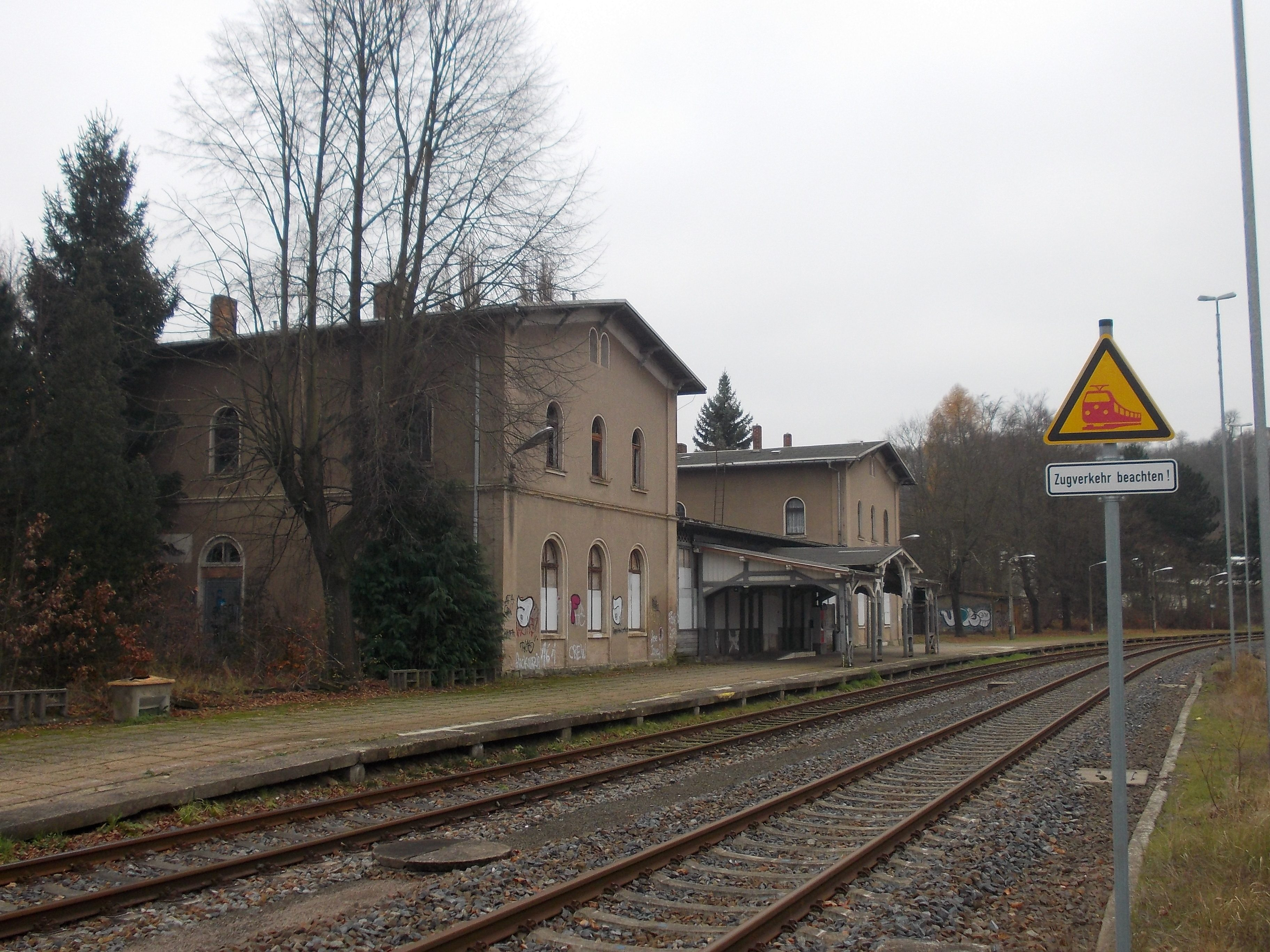
Roßwein station

Roßwein station was opened on 25 October 1868 with the completion of the Döbeln–Nossen section of the Borsdorf–Coswig railway. Between 1872 and 1998, the Roßwein–Niederwiesa railway ran via Hainichen and Frankenberg towards Niederwiesa.

Nossen (51°03′39″N 13°17′36″E)

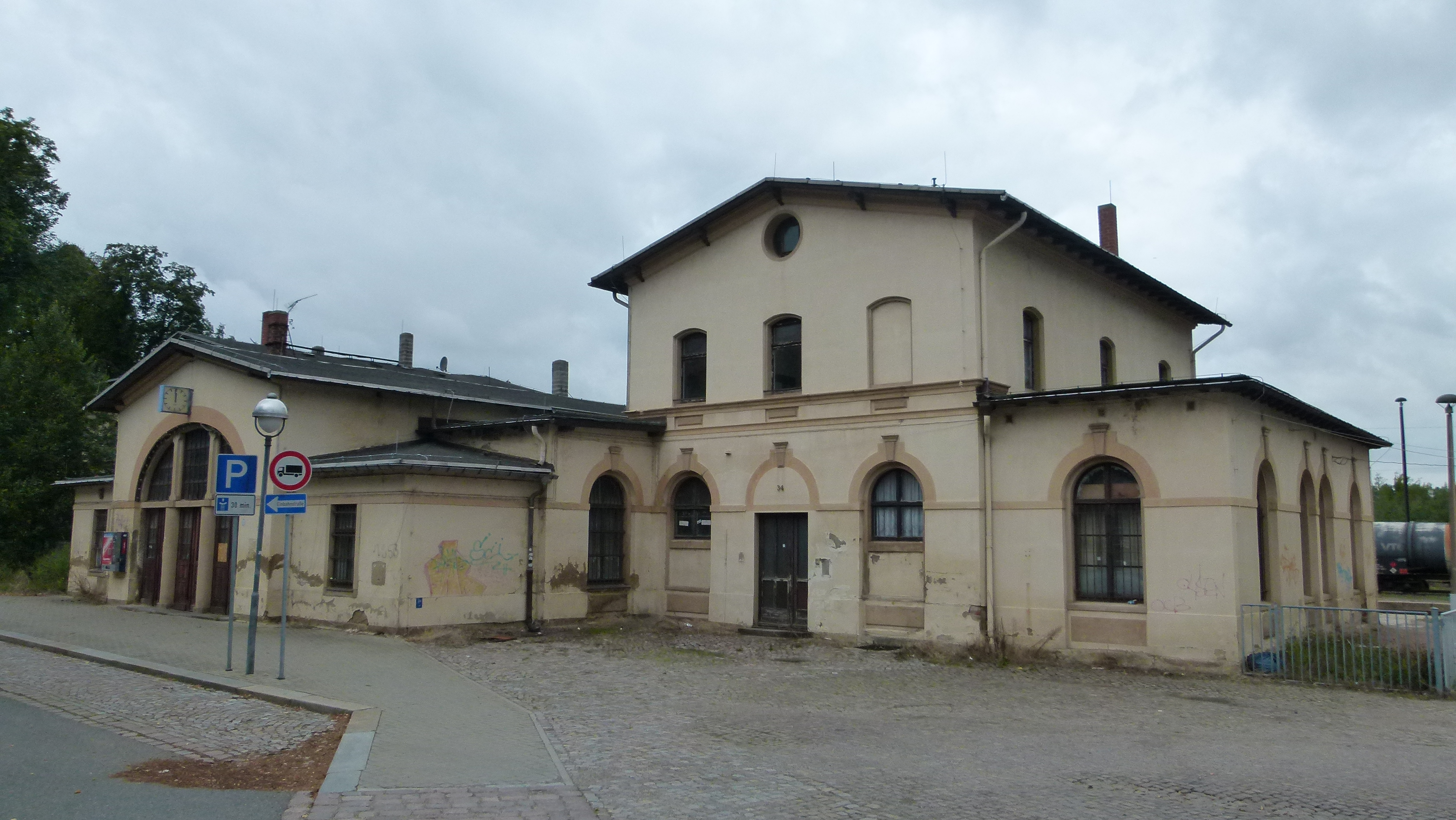
Nossen station

Nossen station was opened by the LDE on 25 October 1868 as part of the Borsdorf–Coswig railway. With the construction of lines to Freiberg (1873) and Riesa (1877/1880) it became an important regional junction with a large railway operation, which existed until the 1990s. Since the discontinuation of regular rail passenger transport between Döbeln and Meißen in December 2015, it has only been used for goods traffic.

Meißen (51°09′46″N 13°28′57″E)

Meißen station, opened in 1860, is located in the Cölln district. The entrance building, which was built in 1928, is a protected monument and is regarded as an important building of its time. After the end of long-distance traffic in the 1960s, the station now has only a regional significance.
