= Roßwein =

- Town
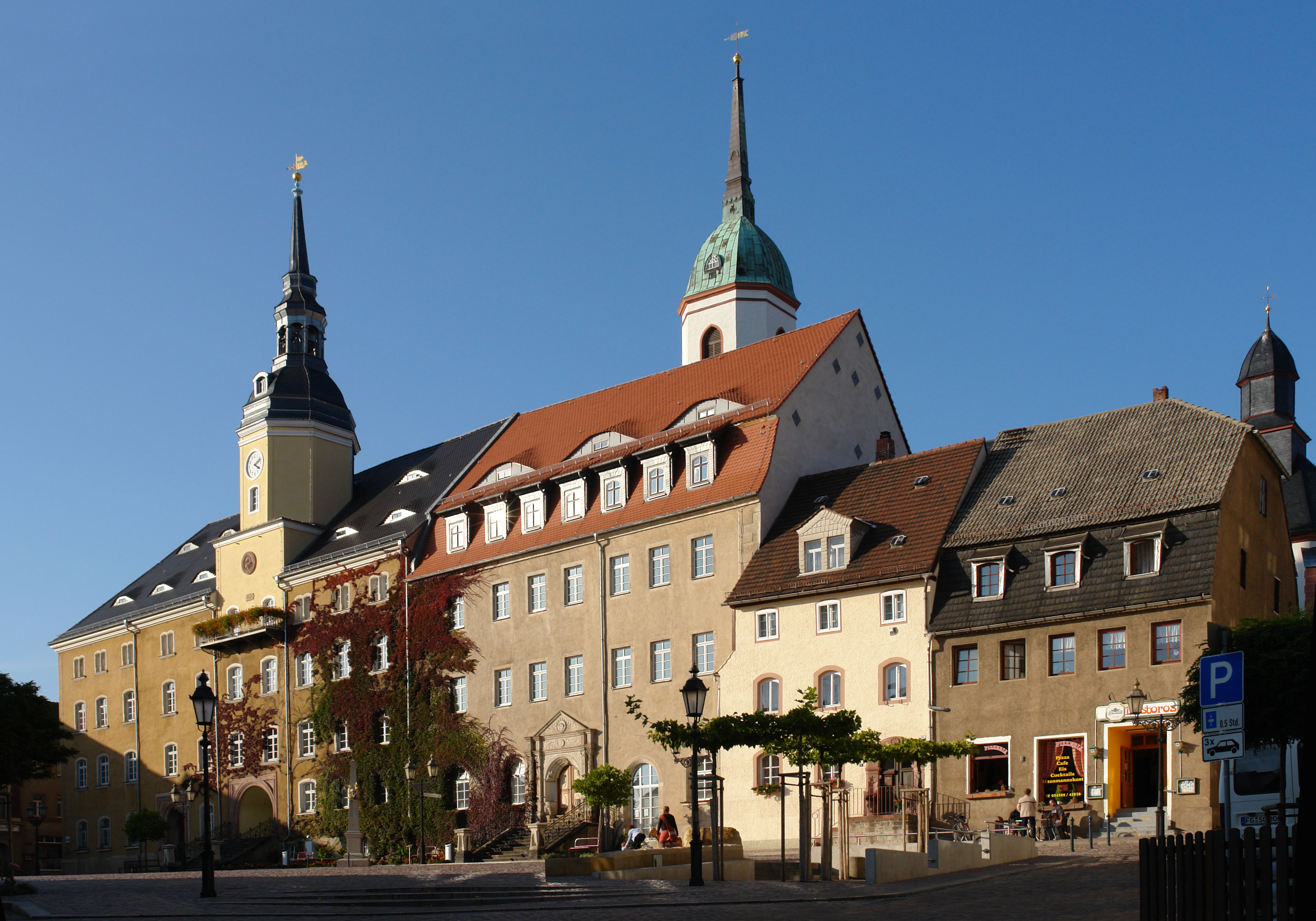
- Market square with town hall

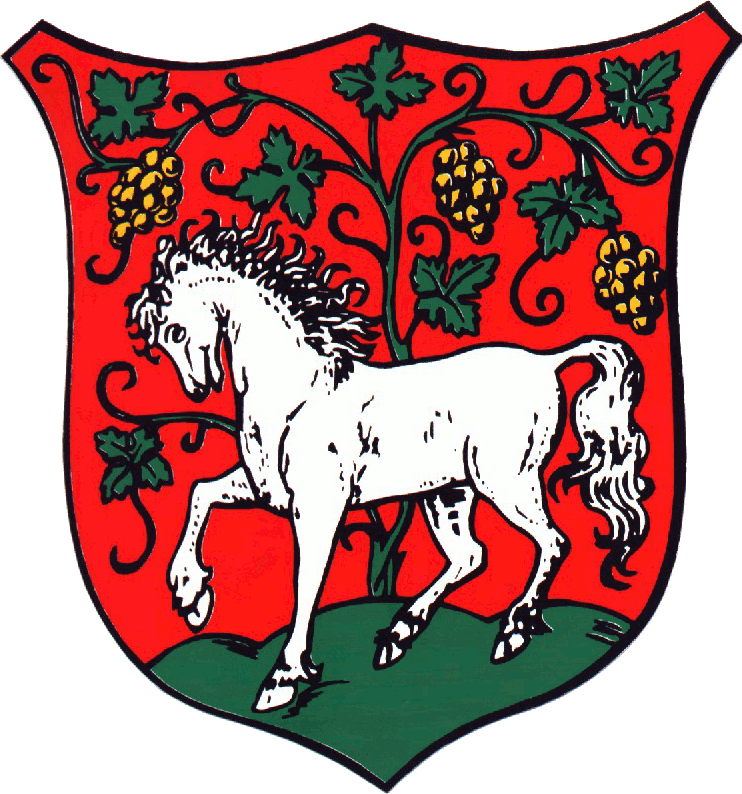
- Coat of arms

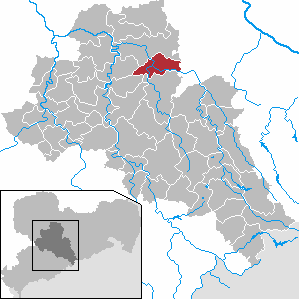
- Location of Roßwein within Mittelsachsen district
- Interactive map of Roßwein
- Location within Germany Location within Saxony
- Coordinates: 51°4′N 13°11′E
- Country: Germany
- State: Saxony
- District: Mittelsachsen

Government
  - Mayor (2022–29): Hubert Paßehr (CDU)

Area
  - Total: 44.1 km^{2} (17.0 sq mi)
- Elevation: 204 m (669 ft)

Population (2025-12-31)
  - Total: 7,062
  - Density: 160/km^{2} (415/sq mi)
- Time zone: UTC+01:00 (CET)
  - Summer (DST): UTC+02:00 (CEST)
- Postal codes: 04741
- Dialling codes: 034322
- Vehicle registration: FG
- Website: www.rosswein.de

Roßwein (German pronunciation: [ˈʁɔsˌvaɪn]) is a town in the district of Mittelsachsen, Saxony, Germany.
