= Radebeul-Zitzschewig station =

Railway station in Germany

Radebeul Zitzschewig
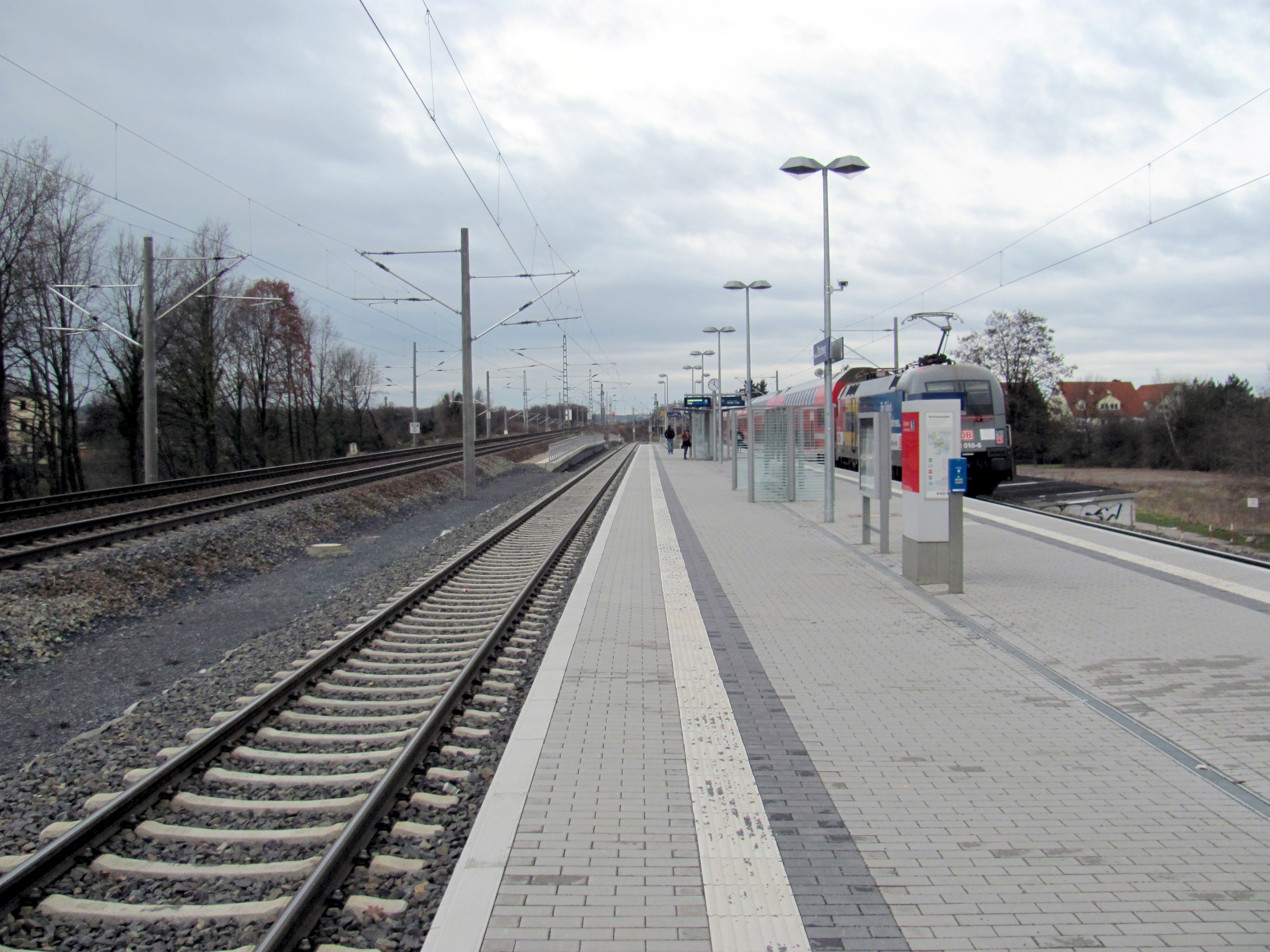
- 2015

General information
- Location: Coswiger Str. 12; 01445 Radebeul; Saxony; Germany
- Coordinates: 51.1145°N 13.6067°E
- System: Hp
- Owner: DB Netz
- Operator: DB Station&Service
- Line: Pirna–Coswig railway
- Platforms: 1 island platform
- Tracks: 5
- Train operators: S-Bahn Dresden

Other information
- Station code: 5088
- DS100 code: DRBZ
- IBNR: 8012701
- Category: 6
- Website: www.bahnhof.de

History
- Opened: 1 May 1902; 124 years ago

Services
Preceding station	Dresden S-Bahn	Following station
Coswig (b Dresden) towards Meißen Triebischtal	S 1	Radebeul-Kötzschenbroda towards Schöna
Location
- Location within Saxony

Radebeul Zitzschewig station (German: Bahnhof Radebeul Zitzschewig) is a railway station in the Große Kreisstadt of Radebeul, Saxony, Germany. The station lies on the Pirna–Coswig railway.

== Gallery ==
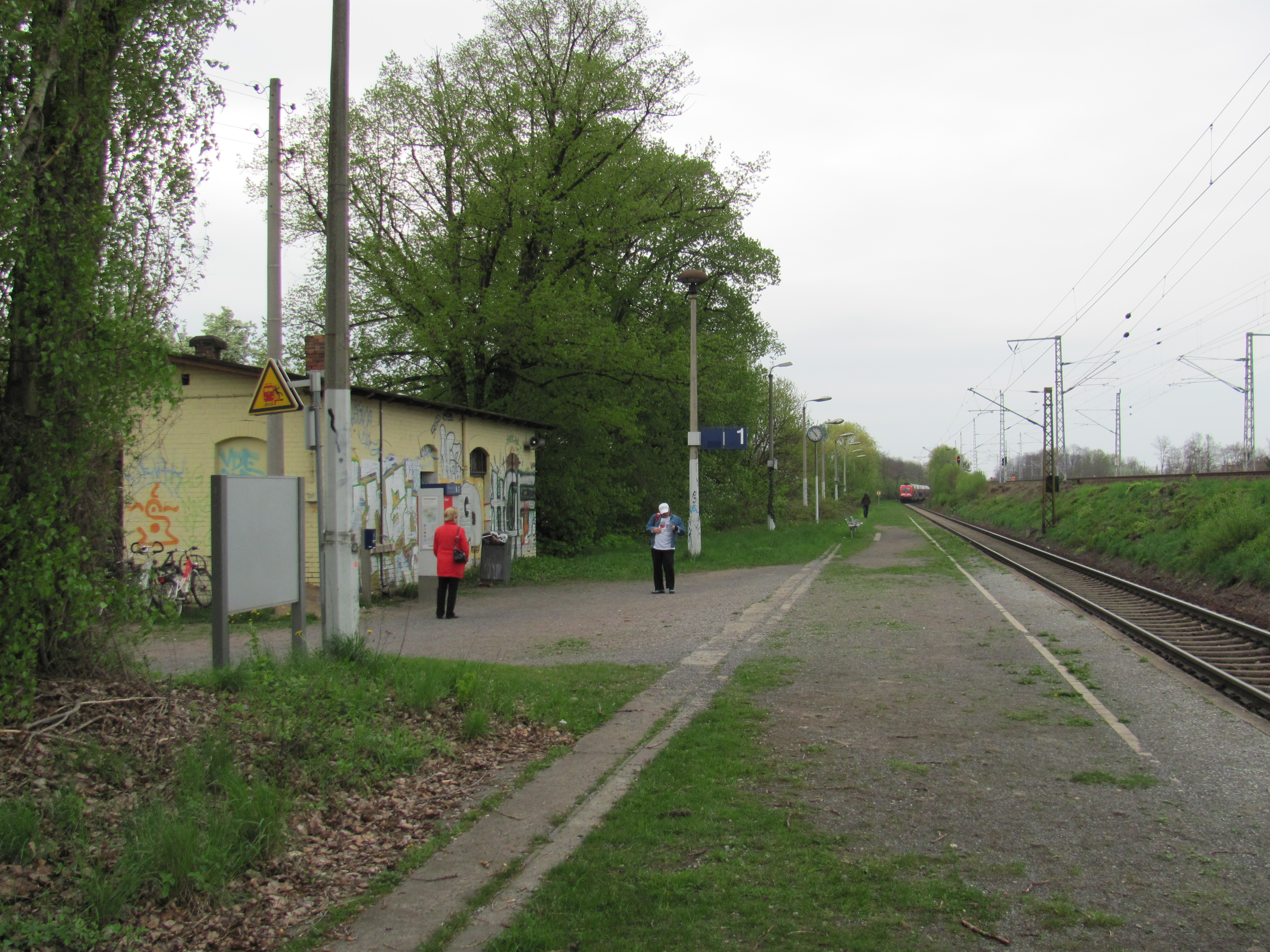
Station in 2013.

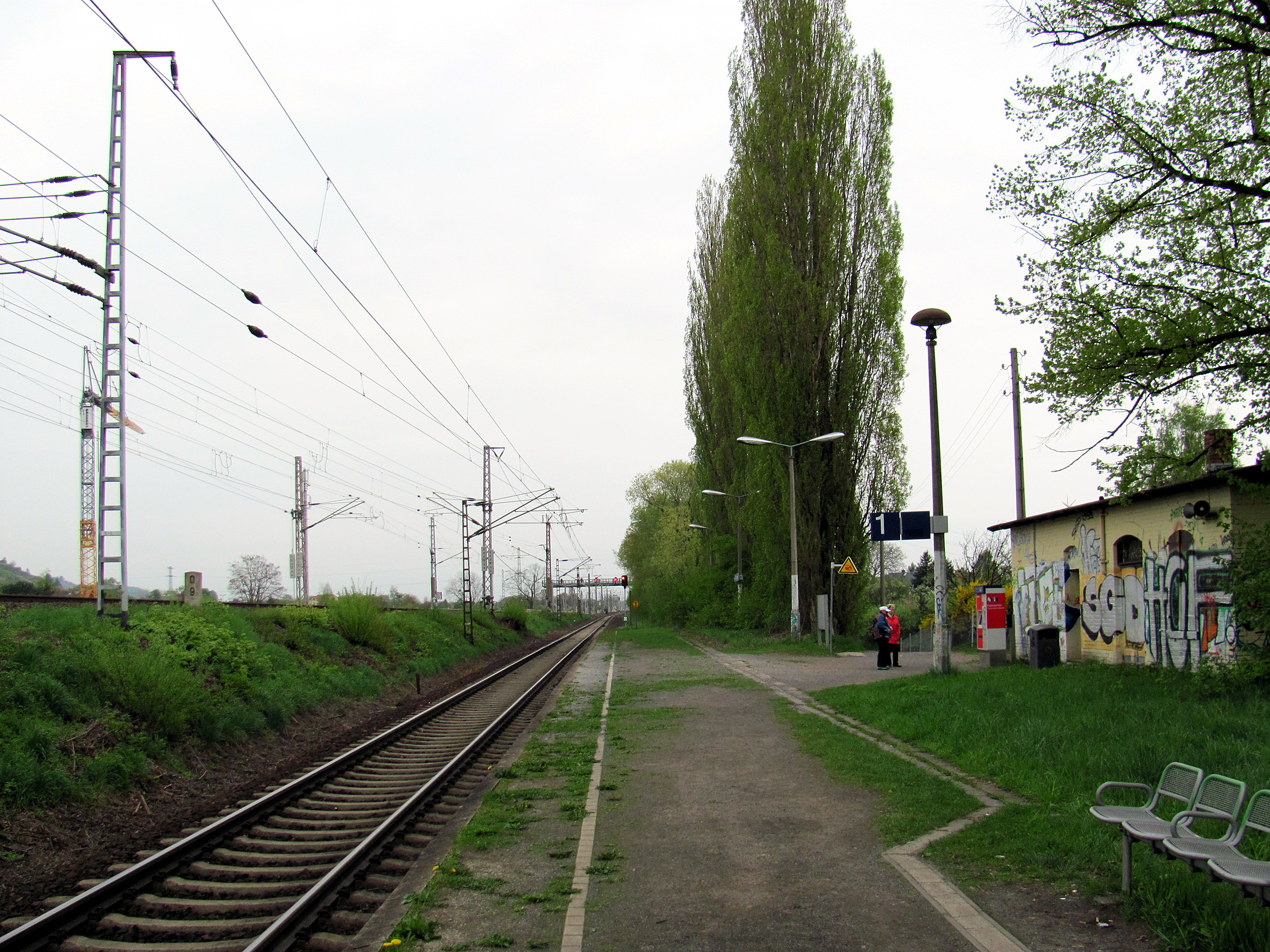
Station in 2013.

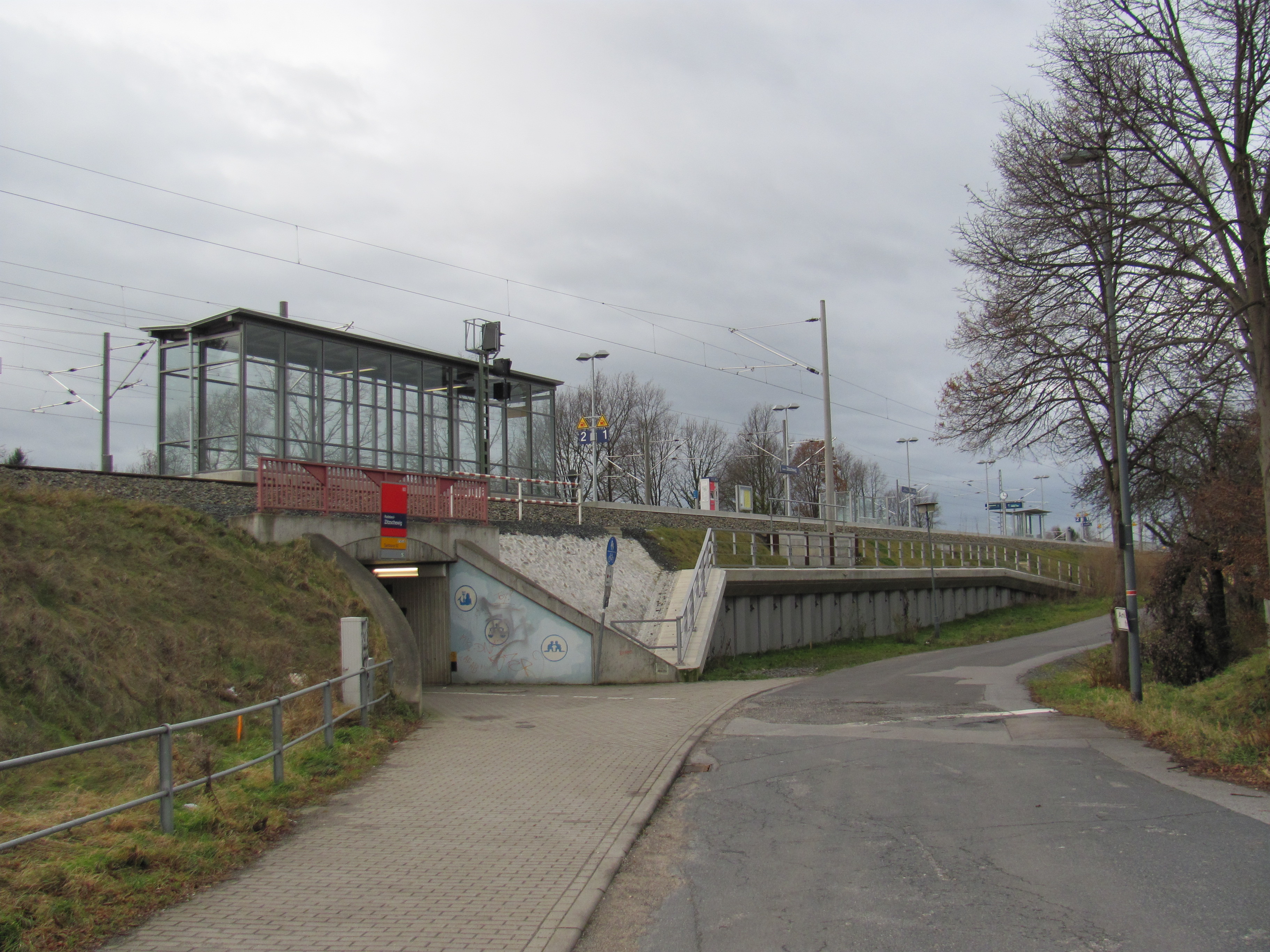
New station in 2015.
