= Herbst- und Weinfest =

German festival

Coordinates: 51.104°N 13.628°E

Herbst- und Weinfest (Autumn and Wine Festival) is a public festival held in Radebeul, Saxony, Germany.

Supported by the Cultural Foundation of the Free State of Saxony, the festival—held on the village green in Kötzschenbroda, Radebeul, a suburb of Dresden—was revived in 1991 and has been enriched by the International Traveling Theater Festival since 1996. The festival generally takes place on the last weekend of September; admission is charged on Saturday and Sunday, whereas the opening events on Friday are free of charge. On the Altkötzschenbroda village green—an area featuring 40 listed historic buildings—visitors taste wine in vaulted cellars and courtyards that are otherwise often inaccessible.
