= Radebeul Ost station =

Railway station in Radebeul, Germany

Radebeul Ost
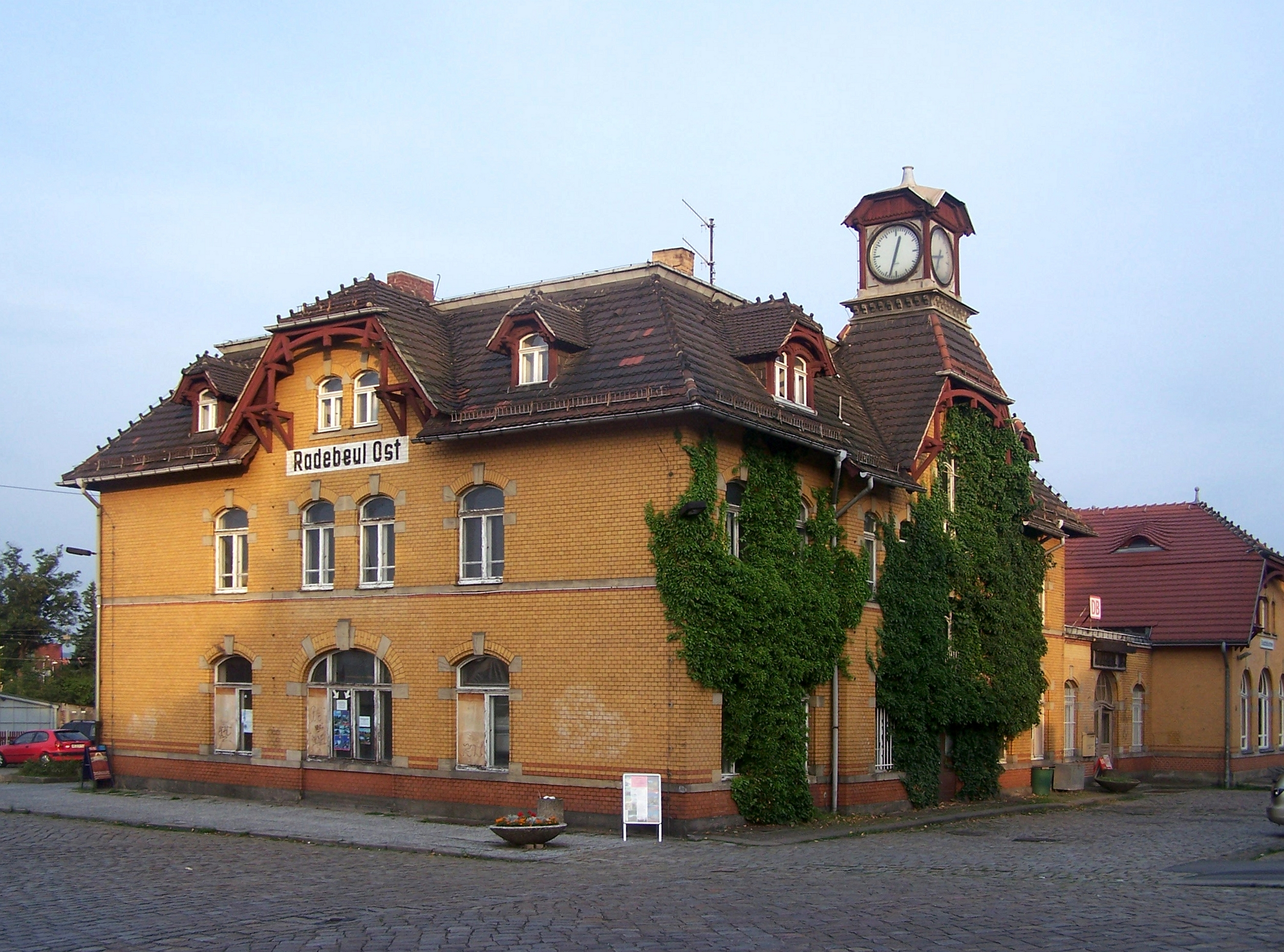

General information
- Location: Sidonienstr. 1, Radebeul, Saxony; Germany
- Coordinates: 51.098611°N 13.679722°E
- System: Interchange station
- Lines: Pirna–Coswig (b Dresden) (S-Bahn); Leipzig Hbf–Dresden-Neustadt (km 109.447); Radebeul–Radeburg railway (km 0.060)
- Platforms: 2

Construction
- Accessible: 2

Other information
- Station code: 5084
- DS100 code: DRB
- IBNR: 8010292
- Category: 5
- Website: www.bahnhof.de

History
- Opened: 29 November 1860

Services
Preceding station	DB Regio Südost	Following station
Coswig (b Dresden) towards Leipzig Hbf	RE 50	Dresden-Neustadt towards Dresden Hbf
Preceding station	Dresden S-Bahn	Following station
Radebeul-Weintraube towards Meißen Triebischtal	S 1	Dresden-Trachau towards Schöna
Preceding station	Saxon Steam Railway Company	Following station
Terminus	Lößnitzgrundbahn	Weißes Roß towards Radeburg
Location
- Location within Saxony

Radebeul Ost (east) station is a station in the Große Kreisstadt of Radebeul in the German state of Saxony. It is in the suburb now called Radebeul-Ost. The station buildings are located within the boundaries of Alt-Radebeul (old Radebeul) on Sidonienstraße. The station is on the Dresden S-Bahn network.

The station is now divided between the heritage-listed station area on the Dresden S-Bahn, the terminal station of the narrow-gauge Radebeul–Radeburg railway (Lößnitzgrundbahn) and its associated facilities, the old goods shed, the narrow-gauge railway museum and the former station building, which is no longer used for rail purposes but is instead operated as the Radebeuler Kultur-Bahnhof (“Radebeul Culture Station”), including an events hall, a library located in the west wing (former waiting room) since 2002 and the adult education college of Meissen district (Volkshochschule im Landkreis Meißen) located in the east wing since 2013. In addition to the events hall in the former station building, the renovated station forecourt is also used as a venue for events.

The station area includes various heritage-listed buildings and it also includes a depot and exhibition space for the storage of many heritage-listed, narrow-gauge locomotives and carriages.

== Description ==
On 27 March 1900, the Saxon Ministry of Finance approved a proposal for a new entrance building to modernise the traditional station building that had been opened in 1860. In May 1900, it authorised the construction of a new building along with the reconstruction of the existing one.

The now heritage-listed station consists of the entrance building, the platforms with canopies and pedestrian subway, a waiting room originally with sections for four passenger classes on the platform, workshop, a goods shed with a building at its end, sets of points, a transporter wagon facility, a loading ramp, two small residences, a boiler house, an engine shed, a water crane, a coal loading facility and a loading road with cobblestone paving.

The narrow-gauge Radebeul–Radeburg railway (Lößnitzgrundbahn or Lößnitz Valley Railway), which begins here, is also heritage-listed with its rolling stock and the exhibition of historic Saxon narrow-gauge rolling stock that is owned by the Dresden Transport Museum, the Saxon Steam Railway Company and the Vereins Traditionsbahn Radebeul (Radebeul traditional railway association).

The station building is an ochre brick complex of two two-storey buildings connected by a single-storey structure. The eastern part of the building also has a roof in the form of a truncated pyramid with gables and it has a ridge turret with a clock on the street side. The main station hall was in the central block with its round arch style main entrance. The western part of the building (on the right from the street) contained the waiting room.

The station was restored in 2002, while the Radebeul-Ost town library, the so-called Erlebnisbibliothek ("experience library"), was installed in the waiting room. The renovation of the library won the special award for commercial buildings in the 2002 Radebeul construction prizes. In 2006, it won the Otto Borst Prize for urban regeneration.

The historic goods shed with its two-storey building at the end of the loading tracks has been rebuilt as the Schmalspurbahnmuseum Radebeul (narrow-gauge railway museum of Radebeul) and the paved road in front of it was renamed in 2005 as Am Alten Güterboden (at the old goods shed). The goods shed itself was given the address of Am Alten Güterboden 4. The renovation, including the remodeling of its precincts, won the 2006 Radebeul construction prize in the category of “commercial and public buildings/special solutions”.

== History ==
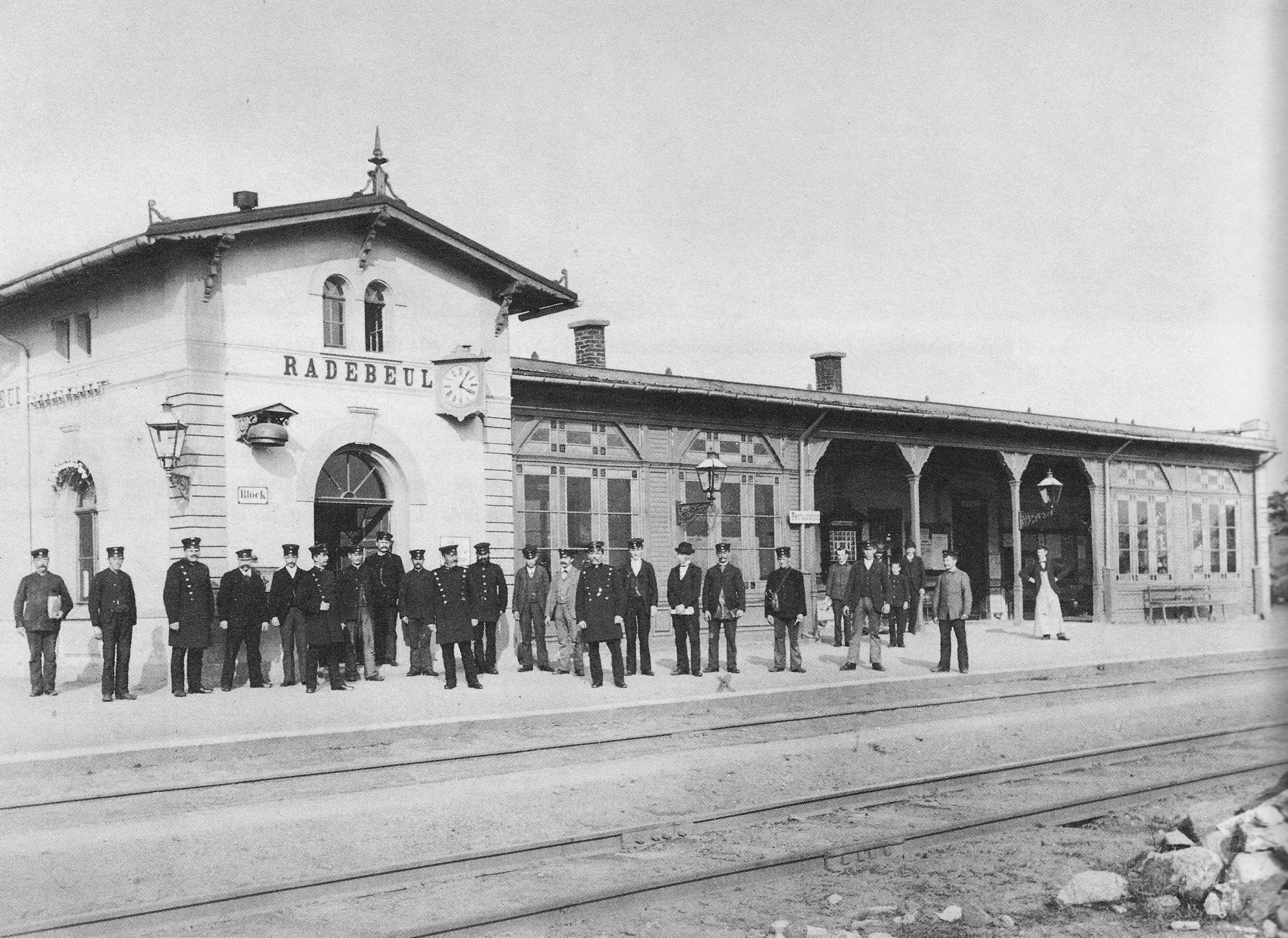
The first station building in 1894

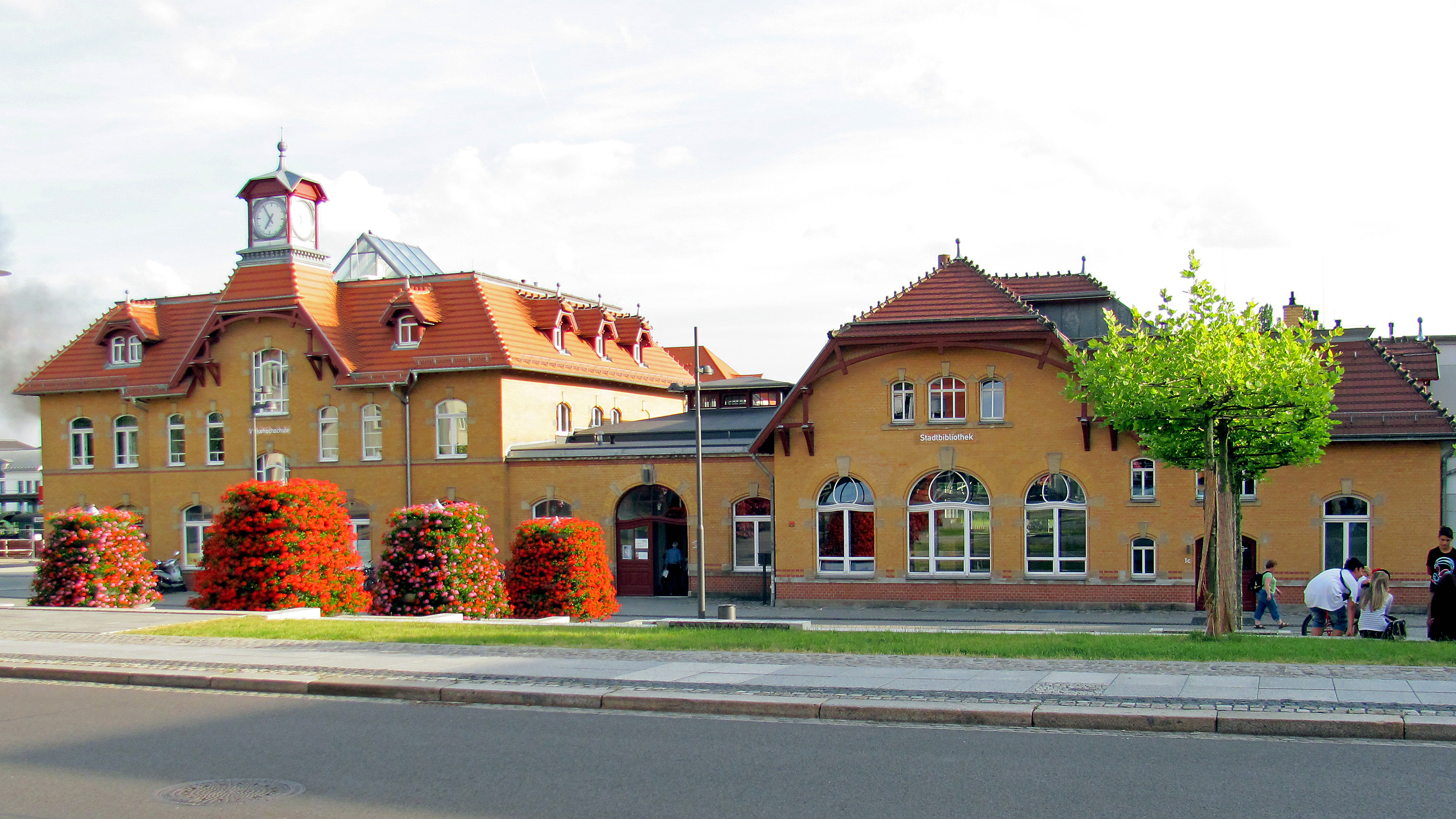
Radebeul Ost “Culture Station” including “Experience Library” (right)

Construction of the Leipzig–Dresden railway, built from 1837 to 1839, was begun from both ends simultaneously. The section from Dresden to Weintraube was opened on 19 July 1838 and at the same time the modern Radebeul-Weintraube station was opened as the first station in what is now the city of Radebeul.

The section from Weintraube via Coswig to Oberau, at the end of the now demolished Oberau Tunnel, was opened on 16 September 1838. The Leipzig–Dresden railway was completed in 1839, it was duplicated in 1839 and 1840 and Kötzschenbroda station was also opened in 1840.

Radebeul station was opened on the line in the rural community of Radebeul on 29 November 1860 and a station hotel (Bahnhofshotel) was built on the south side of the tracks. Two days later, on 1 December 1860, the branch line from Coswig to Meissen, was opened. A station restaurant was built by Moritz Ziller in 1865 and it had been converted into a station hotel by 1888.

The first entrance building was built in 1874. This was north of the railway tracks and south of the present building. In 1900, it was demolished after the new, modern station building had been erected.

The freight tracks were established on 15 October 1876 and Radebeul was reclassified from a halt (Haltepunkt) to a station (Bahnhof) on 1 May 1881. The Kötzschenbroda timetable of 1876 indicates that not all of the 37 train services per day stopped in Radebeul, some only stopped "as required".

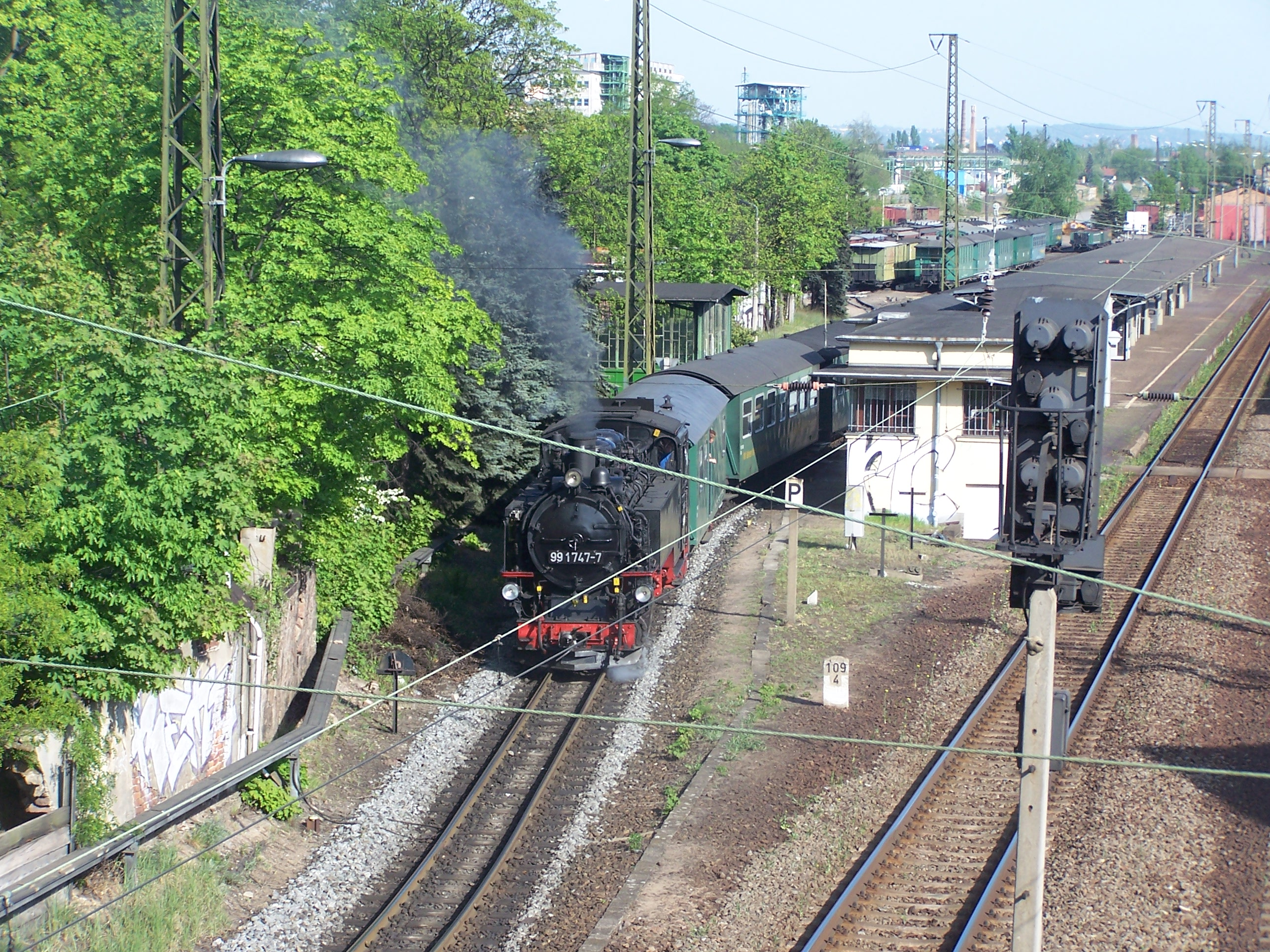
The narrow-gauge Lößnitzdackel (“Lößnitz dachshund”) at Radebeul Ost station. Many stored pieces of rolling stock can be seen above the platform roof.

The construction of the Radebeul–Radeburg railway started in October 1883. The line was opened on 15 September 1884 as the fourth narrow-gauge railway opened in Saxony. The narrow-gauge tracks were built to the north of the existing station building, converting it into an Inselbahnhof (an “island station” that was surrounded by rail tracks).

The redevelopment of the Dresden railway node from 1890 to 1901 included the quadruplication of the railway line to Leipzig between Dresden-Neustadt and Coswig. In this context, Radebeul station was fundamentally rebuilt between 1898 and 1901. The old station building had been squeezed in the space between the main railway and the narrow gauge railway and it was replaced by a new building further north, which went into operation on 25 October 1900 together with a new pedestrian subway to the island and side platforms. Since then, both the standard gauge and the narrow-gauge railway lines have run to the south of the station building. That same year, four-track operations began between Radebeul and Coswig and these were extended between Radebeul and Dresden-Neustadt in 1901 with the opening of the new Dresden-Neustadt station. The level crossing of the street now called Hauptstraße (main street) was replaced by a road bridge and the new railway station was lit at night by electricity with power from the Niederlößnitz power station.

The station was named Radebeul Ost on 5 May 1941.

Several tracks were dismantled for war reparations to the Soviet Union in 1945. In Radebeul Ost station the tracks concerned were tracks 2 and 3. Track 1 and the remaining narrow gauge tracks (4 and 5) were the only tracks left in the station area. Outside the station area the only track left was the more southerly track 5.

In the early 1960s, a central track was built in preparation for a future mixed-gauge operation with a correspondingly large clearance gauge so that it could handle Soviet broad-gauge wagons (1520 mm gauge). The narrow gauge part remained unchanged.

Platform 5 has been decommissioned. It is to be replaced by a three-track upgrade of the line to Dresden and a platform 6 is planned as a bay platform for additional peak-hour services from Dresden.

== Transport services ==
Radebeul Ost is served by Regional-Express services between Dresden and Leipzig, Dresden S-Bahn services on line S1, SDG services on the Radebeul–Radeburg railway and two regional bus lines. The only remaining rail freight is in connection with the Arzneimittelwerk Dresden pharmaceutical plant. The station has a commuter car park and covered bicycle parking.

Line	Route	Frequency (min)
S 1	Meißen-Triebischtal – Meißen – Radebeul-Kötzschenbroda – Radebeul-Weintraube – Radebeul Ost – Dresden-Neustadt – Dresden Hbf – Heidenau – Pirna – Bad Schandau – Schöna	30
RE 50	Dresden Hbf – Dresden-Neustadt – Radebeul Ost – Riesa – Oschatz – Wurzen – Leipzig	60
SDG	Radebeul Ost – Friedewald Bad – Moritzburg – Bärnsdorf – Berbisdorf – Radeburg	5-7 departures per day
Bus 475	Dippelsdorf – Radebeul Ost - Radebeul-Kötzschenbroda	60
Bus 476	Dresden-Trachau - Radebeul Ost - Radebeul-Kötzschenbroda	60

== Construction ==
The southern part of Radebeul Ost station formerly had three through platforms. The northern part of it is a terminal station of the narrow gauge railway, with a freight yard with marshalling facilities and facilities for transferring wagons between the standard-gauge and narrow-gauge lines using transporter wagons.

The station has been rebuilt so that the northern pair of standard-gauge tracks handle S-Bahn services at an island platform and the southern pair of tracks, which have no platforms, handle long-distance passenger and freight transport.

The operation of regional services was to be dropped with the commissioning of the S-Bahn tracks, but this has not yet been implemented.

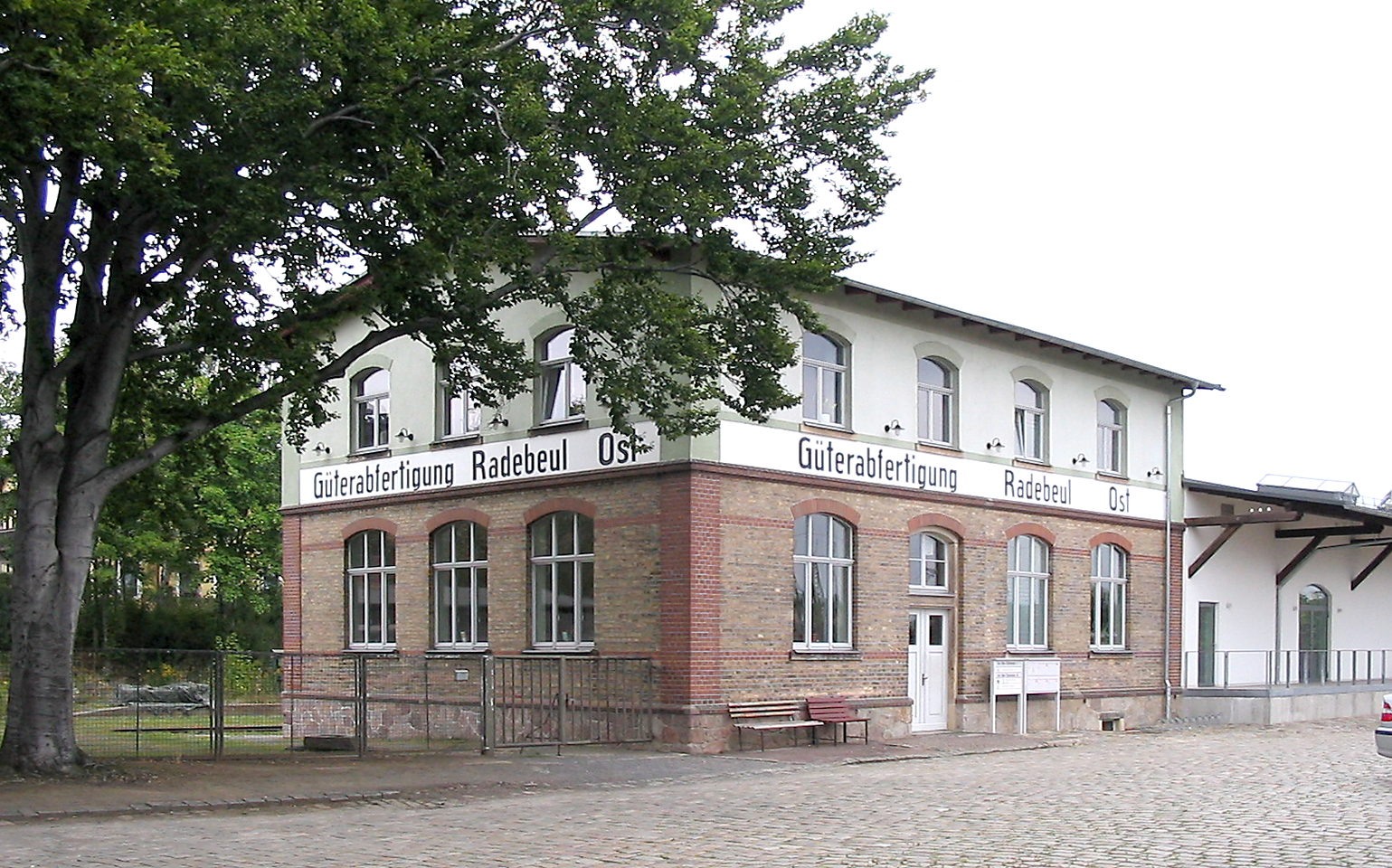
Radebeul Ost station: old goods shed; head building; goods hall to the right

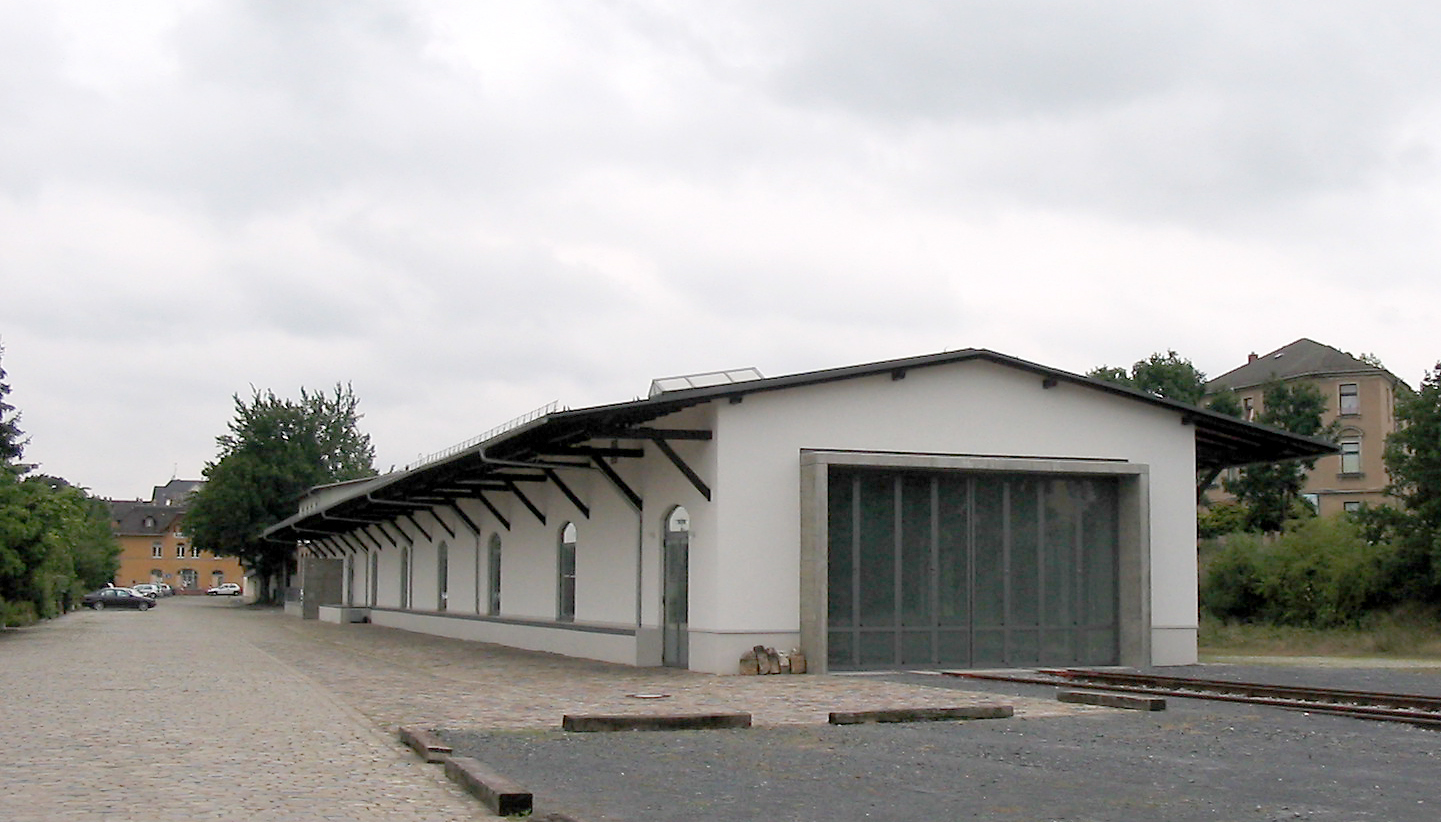
Radebeul Ost station: old goods shed; goods hall from the other side, entrance gate

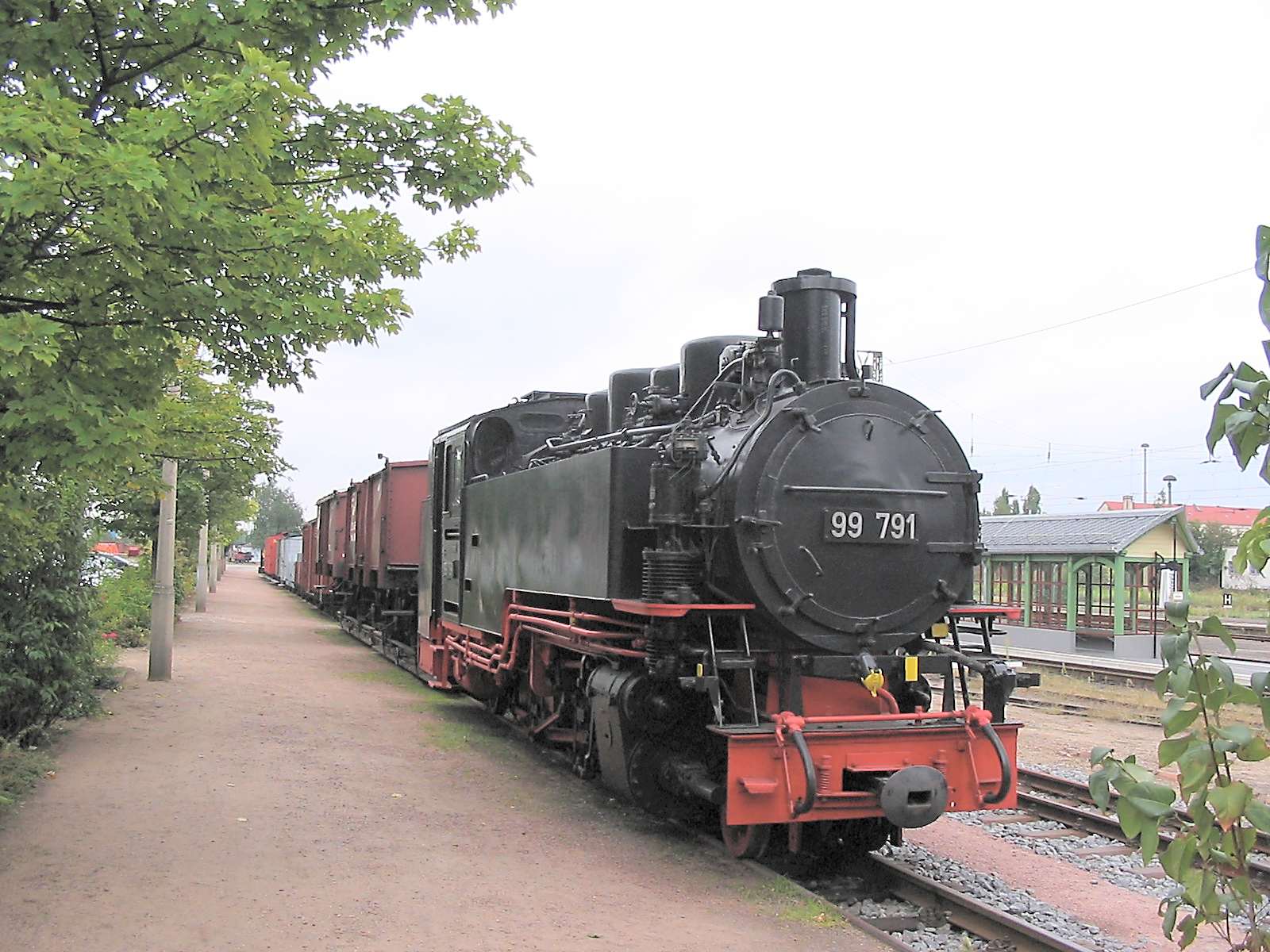
Radebeul Ost station: old goods yard; narrow-gauge locomotive with wagon

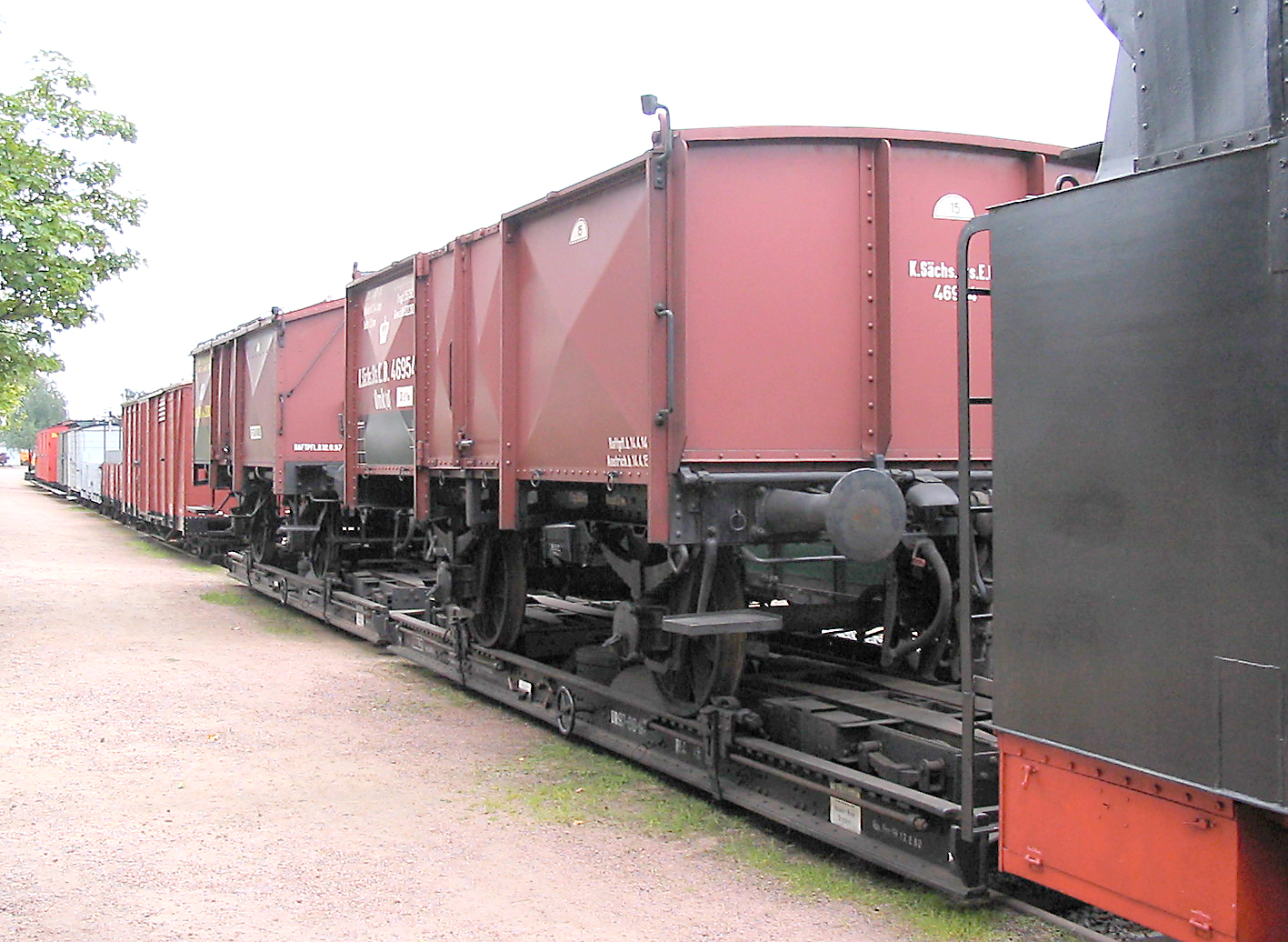
Radebeul Ost station: old goods yard; 2 standard-gauge wagons on narrow-gauge transporter wagons

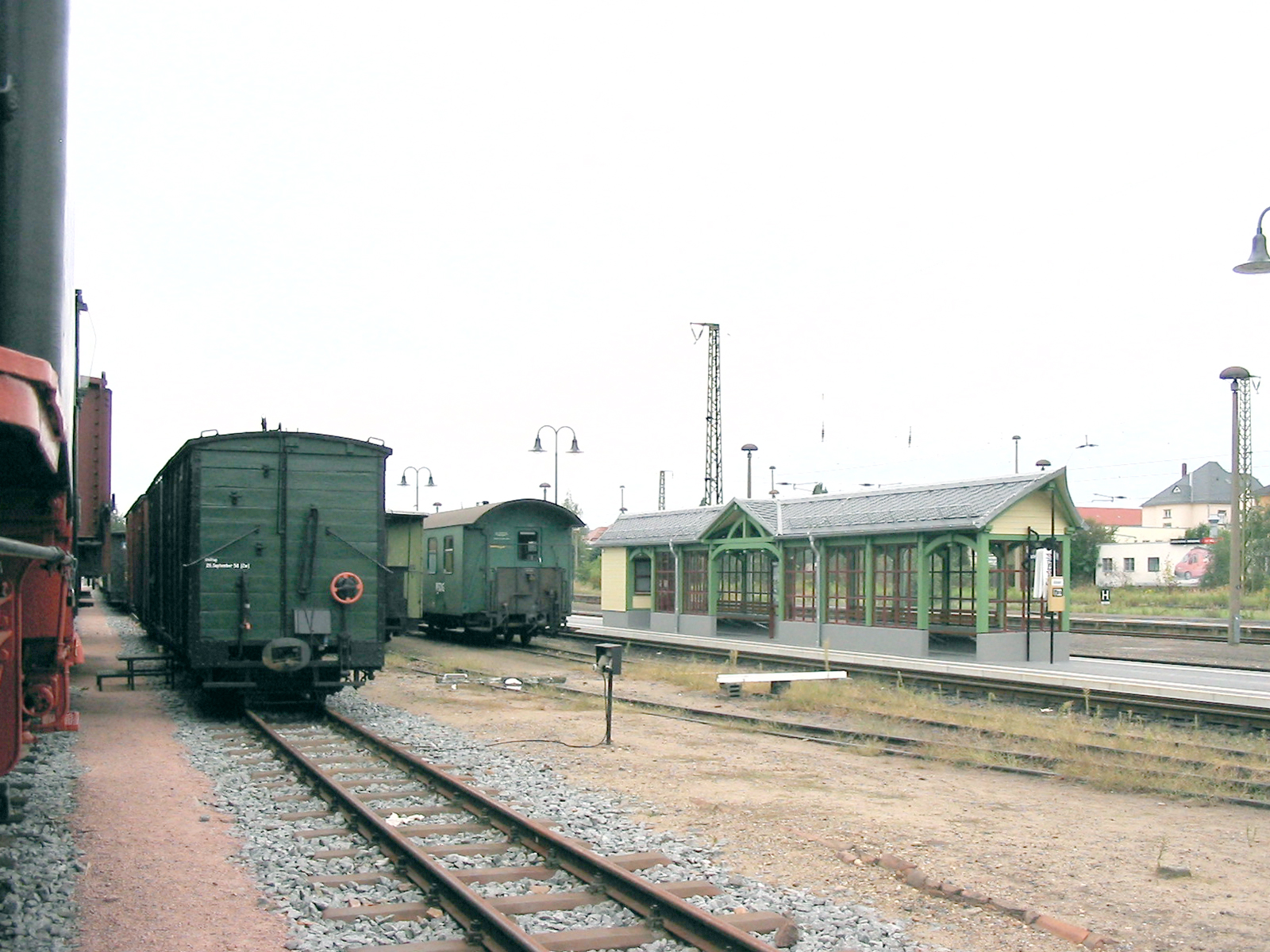
Radebeul Ost station: old goods yard; new waiting room, narrow-gauge wagons
