= Radebeul-Kötzschenbroda station =

Railway station in Radebeul, Germany

Radebeul Kötzschenbroda
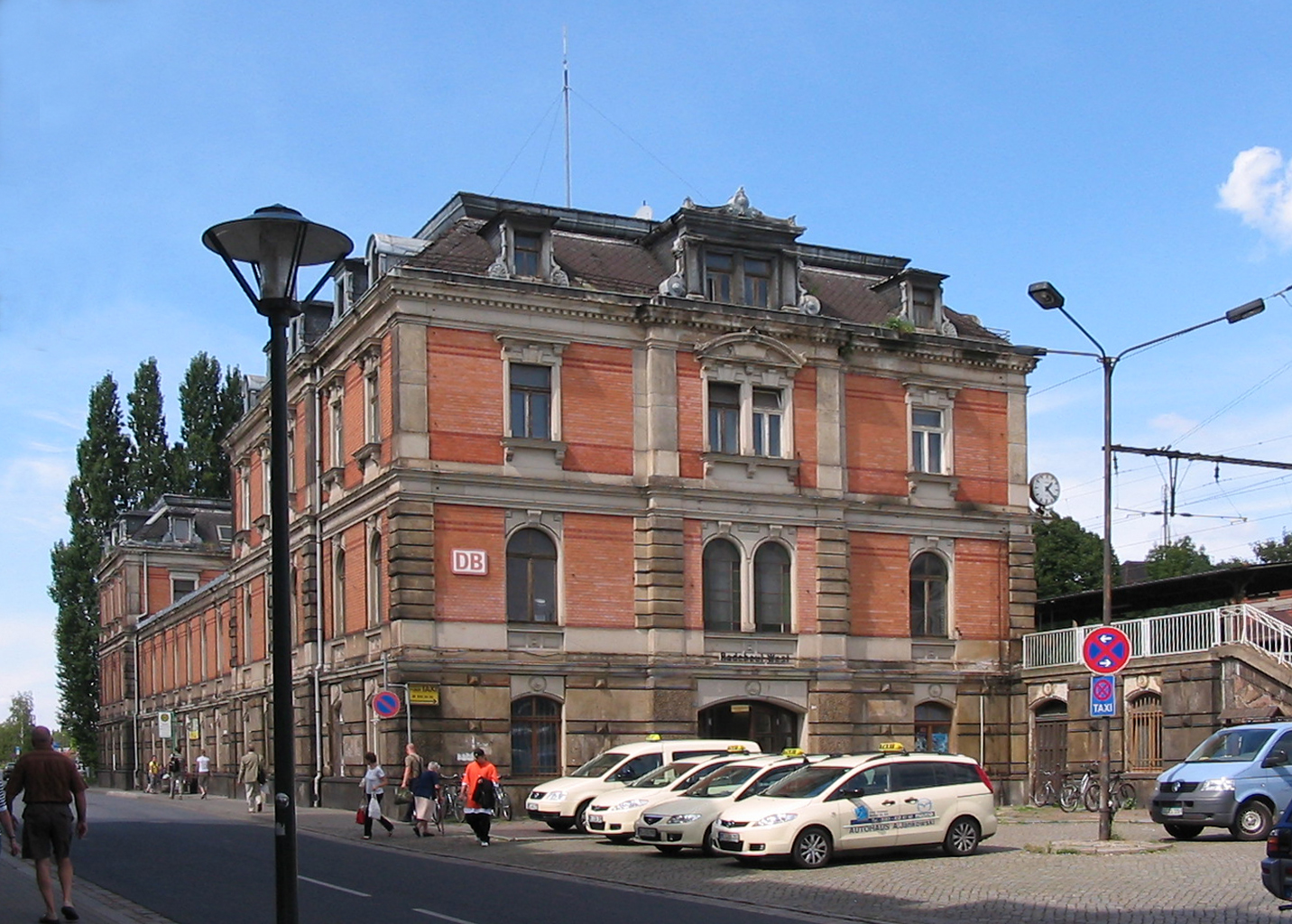

General information
- Location: Radebeul, Saxony; Germany
- Coordinates: 51°06′28″N 13°37′43″E
- System: Through station
- Lines: Pirna–Coswig (b Dresden) (S-Bahn); Leipzig–Dresden railway (km 105.78; transit only)
- Platforms: 2

Construction
- Accessible: Yes

Other information
- Station code: 5085
- DS100 code: DRBK
- IBNR: 8010293
- Category: 5
- Website: www.bahnhof.de

History
- Opened: 1840
- Rebuilt: 2010–2014
- Former names: Kötzschenbroda; Radebeul West

Key dates
- 1896: Historic station building opened

Services
Preceding station	Dresden S-Bahn	Following station
Radebeul-Zitzschewig towards Meißen Triebischtal	S 1	Radebeul-Weintraube towards Schöna
Location
- Location within Saxony

The Radebeul-Kötzschenbroda station is in Kötzschenbroda, a district of Radebeul in the German state of Saxony. It is classified by Deutsche Bahn as a Haltepunkt (“halt”, that is it has no sets of points). It is located on the Pirna–Coswig railway, which was recently created as a separate line as part of the upgrade of the Leipzig–Dresden railway. The station, which was previous called Radebeul West, was rebuilt and renamed Radebeul-Kötzschenbroda in 2013 and it is now served mainly by the Dresden S-Bahn.

== Description ==
In order to modernise Kötzschenbroda station, which was opened by the Royal Saxon State Railways in 1840, work began on 11 March 1895 on the building of a new station building in Kötzschenbroda in the district of Lößnitz. The new station, consisting of an entrance and terminal building, a waiting hall, platform roofs and a railway workers' residence, was completed on 15 February 1896 and inaugurated on 16 June 1896. The former station building, which dated back to 1872 and is now located in the yard of 281 Meissner Straße, has been used since 1896 as a residential building.

The prestigious entrance building in the style of the so-called Semper-Nicolai school of Dresden architecture is south of the main tracks. It consists of two similar, approximately square, villa-style buildings in the Renaissance Revival style with truncated pyramid roofs that stand some distance apart and are connected by a lower building and are all set parallel to the tracks. From the street, the building has three floors, but only two floors are apparent from the elevated railway tracks. The facade is emphasised by central avant-corps and divided by lesenes and cornices. The windows have flattened arches on the ground floor, round arches on the first floor and are rectangular on the second floor.

Inside there is the lobby, a vestibule and a staircase, all of which are almost unchanged. Since its reconstruction the former passages to the platforms no longer exist; the S-Bahn station is now reached by an underpass.

The heritage-listed station was, at least until its reconstruction in 2012/13, one of the few stations in Saxony that was completely preserved generally in its original condition and used for its original purpose.

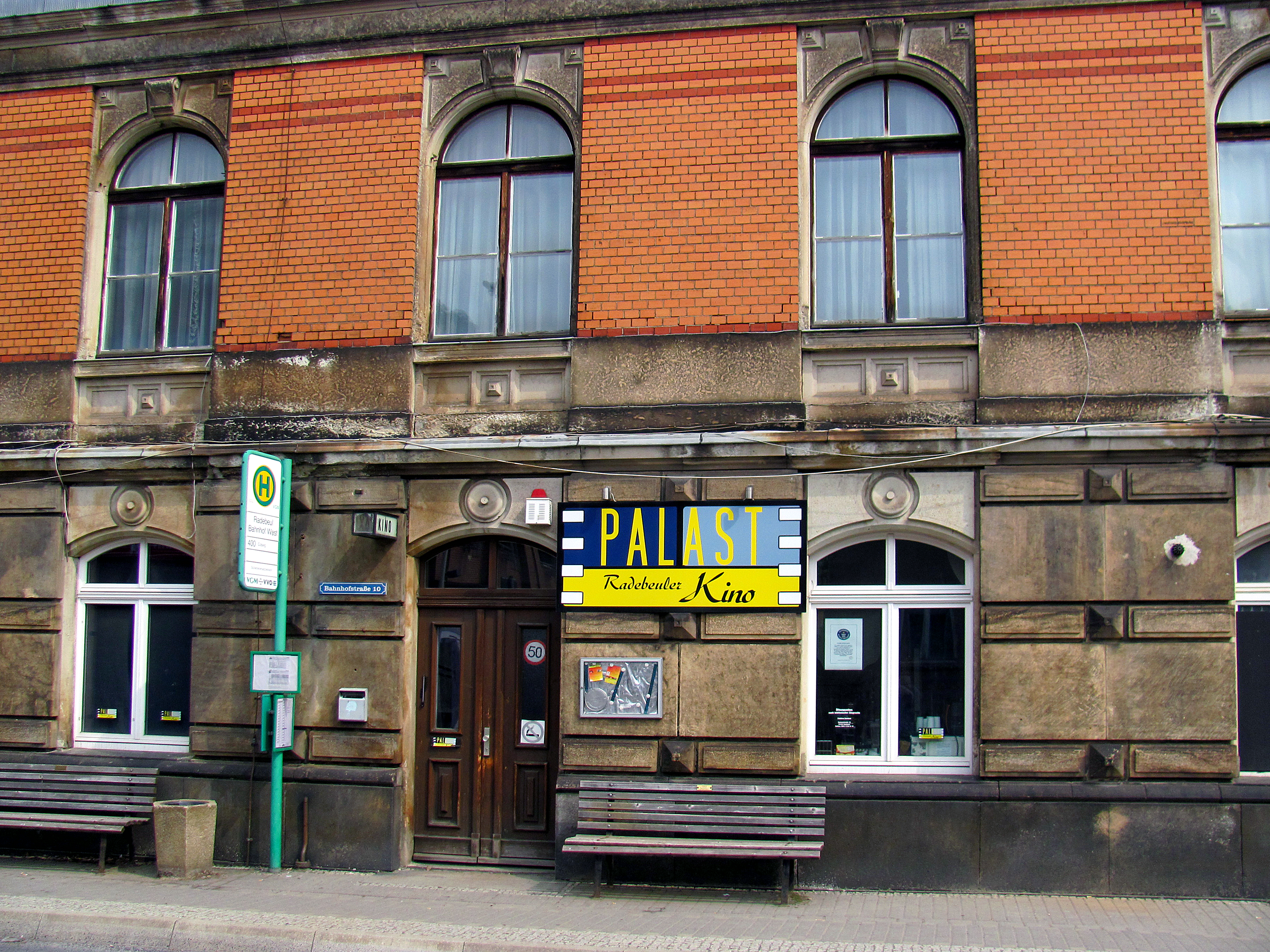
The Palastkino cinema

The station contained a nine-seater commercial cinema called the Palastkino, which was recognised as the "smallest cinema by seat capacity" by the Guinness Book of Records in 2006. It was closed in 2013.

== History ==
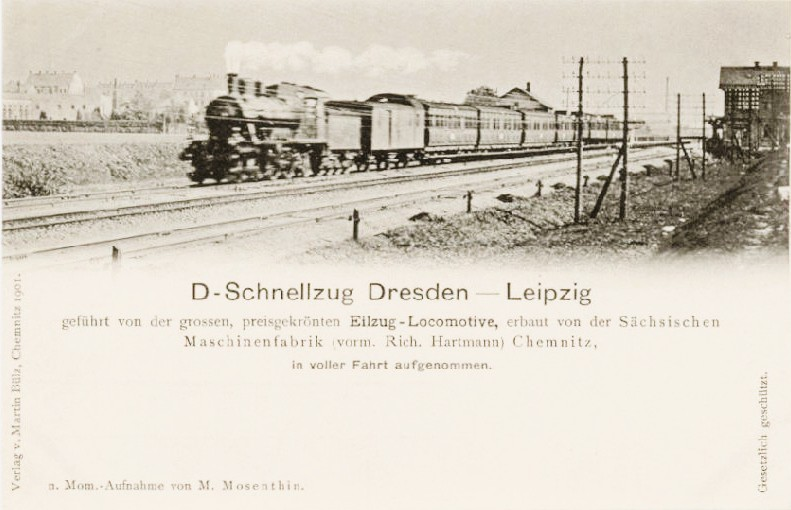
Dresden–Leipzig Express, hauled by a Saxon X V locomotive, running at full speed in Kötzschenbroda station in the summer of 1901

The construction of the Leipzig–Dresden railway between 1837 and 1839 was begun from both ends simultaneously. The section from Dresden to Weintraube was opened on 19 July 1838 and at the same time the first station was opened within the borders of the modern town of Radebeul at the location of the current Radebeul-Weintraube station.

The section from Weintraube via Coswig to Oberau was opened on 3 November 1838, prior to the completion of the Oberau Tunnel. After the opening of the entire Leipzig–Dresden line in 1839, the whole line was doubled and this was completed in 1840. Kötzschenbroda station was also opened in 1840.

Trains stopped in Kötzschenbroda and in Weintraube only on certain days in the early years.

Kötzschenbroda station gained a waiting room in 1868 and a freight facility was built on the Güterhofstraße to the south of the rail tracks and west of the station in 1871. As a result of the incorporation of sets of points, it was reclassified from Haltepunkt to Bahnhof (station). The first station building was built in 1872 in the garden of the Victoria Railway Hotel (Bahnhotels "Victoria") north of the tracks.

The Kötzschenbroda timetable of 1876 indicated that 37 daily passenger trains then stopped in Kötzschenbroda.

In the course of the installation of four tracks on the line in 1896, the level crossing at Bahnhofstrasse was replaced by a bridge for the two new tracks, which were built on an embankment to a newly rebuilt station. After trains were diverted on to these new tracks, the old tracks were closed so that the embankment and the station could be widened. Operations on all four tracks commenced in 1900.

As of 12 October 1899, a narrow-gauge interurban, the Lößnitz tramway (the Lößnitzbahn, popularly known as Lößnitzschaukel or "Lößnitz swing”) stopped a few metres from the station on the corner of Meißner Straße and Moritzburger Straße. This line ran to Mickten, where it was possible to change to Dresden trams.

With the incorporation of Kötzschenbroda into Radebeul, the station was renamed Radebeul-Kötzschenbroda in 1935 and Radebeul West in 1941.

In 1946, some tracks were dismantled for war reparations to the Soviet Union. The middle two tracks in Radebeul West station were removed; the remaining northern track was used for traffic to and from Zitzschewig and Berlin and the southern track for traffic to and from Coswig.

In the early 1960s Radebeul West Station was rebuilt in preparation for a future mixed-gauge operation and correspondingly large clearance gauge so that it could handle Soviet broad-gauge wagons (1520 mm gauge). A modern signal box with relay interlocking (WSSB GS II Sp 64 b type) was installed during the reconstruction of the station with four platform tracks. This was the first of this type installed by Deutsche Reichsbahn. It went into operation on 27 March 1969.

Since 1996, Radebeul-Kötzschenbroda has been a stop on S-Bahn line S1 of the Verkehrsverbund Oberelbe. The station's freight facility has since been demolished.

From October 2009 to February 2012, the covered section of platform 1 was closed because of the threat of a collapse of the platform canopy. Between February 2012 and November 2013, the platform canopy was secured by a housing, so that passengers could reach a temporary platform during its reconstruction. Since November 2013, the former platform on track 1 has not been used for rail purposes and public access to is now blocked.

In February 2012, the new long-distance tracks went into operation. Two makeshift platforms were used until November 2013 for boarding and alighting.

The northern, listed building (entrance and former waiting room) was demolished and a supporting wall was built in its place in April 2013. It previously served as the entrance to the platform tunnels. The only entrance to the new platform is now from Bahnhofstrasse; it has stairs and a lift.

Signs reading Radebeul-Kötzschenbroda were installed on the new platform in November 2013. There is also a sign reading Erlebnisweingut Schloss Wackerbarth ("Wackerbarth castle winery experience”).

At the timetable change on 15 December 2013, it was officially renamed Radebeul-Kötzschenbroda. The newly established junction in the western part of the former station was given the name of Radebeul Nord (north). The long-distance tracks have no platforms any more and allow the passage of trains at up to 160 km/h. The former station building is to be used in the future for non-railway purposes.

== S-Bahn ==
Since December 2013, the station has been served exclusively by line S1 of the Dresden S-Bahn. Trains depart at 30-minute intervals; in the future this is planned to be reduced to 15-minute intervals.

Line	Route	Frequency (min)
S 1	Meißen-Triebischtal – Meißen – Coswig (b Dresden) – Radebeul-Zitzschewig – Radebeul-Kötzschenbroda – Radebeul-Weintraube – Dresden-Neustadt – Dresden Hbf – Heidenau – Pirna – Bad Schandau – Schöna	30

== Construction ==
Radebeul West station was formerly a through station with two outside platforms and one island platform in the middle. The long-distance through traffic passed without stopping on the middle tracks and the S-Bahn trains stopped on the outside tracks.

From 2010 to 2012, two new tracks without platforms were built for long-distance traffic on the south side. By 2014, two new S-Bahn tracks were built on the north side. In the station area the island platform was connected by stairs and a lift to the road underpass to provide barrier-free access.
