= Radebeul-Weintraube station =

Railway station in Germany

Radebeul Weintraube
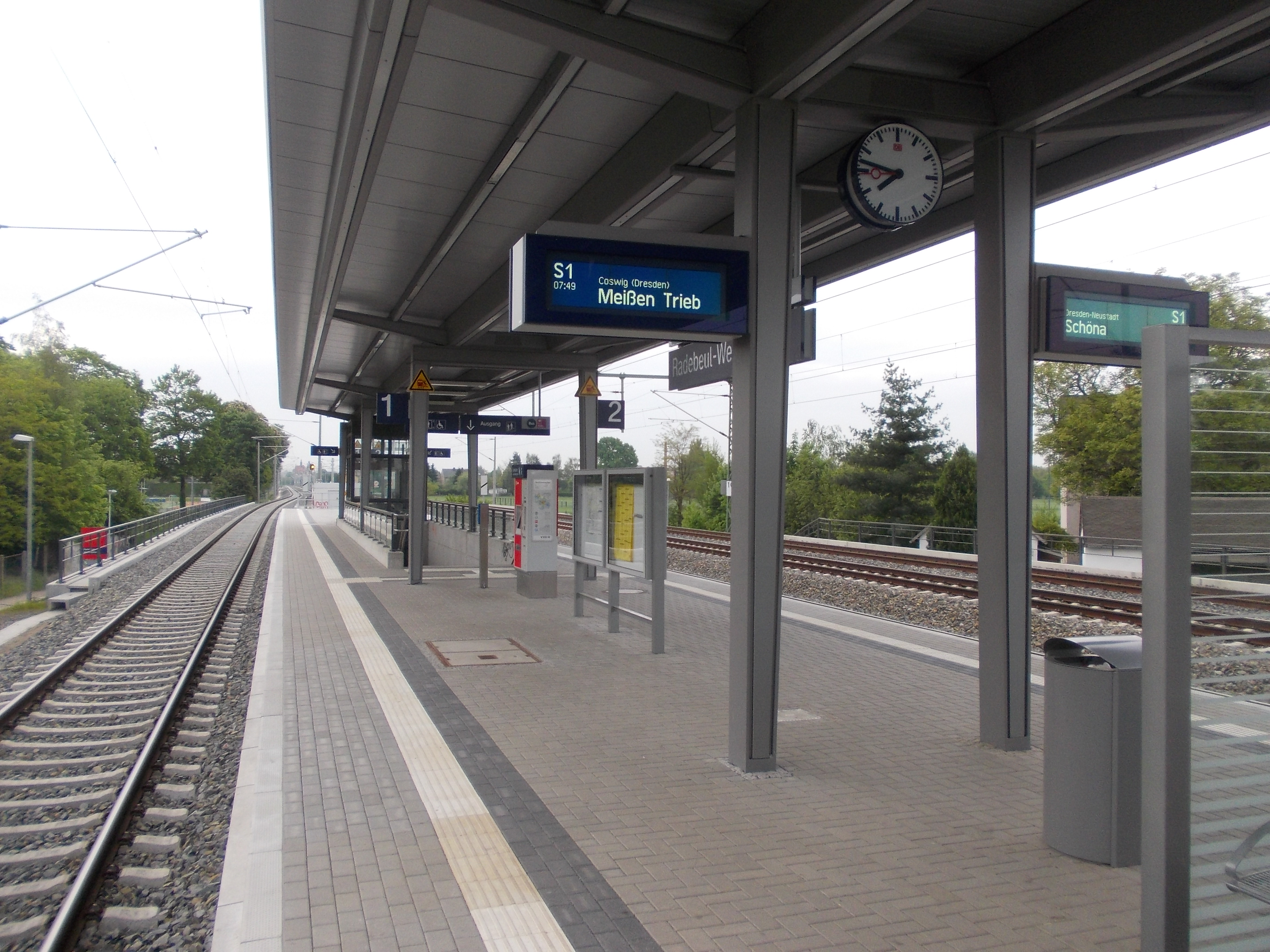
- Island platform between the S-Bahn tracks, long-distance tracks to the right (2014)

General information
- Location: Richard-Wagner-Str. 5, Radebeul, Saxony; Germany
- Coordinates: 51.103119°N 13.655936°E
- System: Through station
- Line: Schöna / Bad Schandau / Pirna–Meißen (S-Bahn) (km 29.1)
- Platforms: 2

Construction
- Accessible: Yes

Other information
- Station code: 5087
- DS100 code: DRBT
- IBNR: 8012700
- Category: 6
- Website: www.bahnhof.de

History
- Opened: 19 July 1838

Services
Preceding station	Dresden S-Bahn	Following station
Radebeul-Kötzschenbroda towards Meißen Triebischtal	S 1	Radebeul Ost towards Schöna
Location
- Location within Saxony

Radebeul-Weintraube station is in Radebeul in the German state of Saxony. It is classified by Deutsche Bahn as a Haltepunkt (“halt”, that is it has no sets of points). Weintraube (“bunch of grapes”) station was opened in 1838 in the Lößnitz fields (the banks of the Elbe downstream from Dresden) as the first station out of Dresden on Germany's oldest long-distance railway, the Leipzig–Dresden railway. It is now the oldest station still regularly served in Saxony.

== History ==
Construction of the Leipzig–Dresden railway was begun from both ends simultaneously and it was opened in stages between 1837 and 1839. The 8.18 km long section from Dresden-Neustadt to Weintraube was opened on 19 July 1838. The current Radebeul-Weintraube station was opened near the royal estate of Hoflößnitz as the first station on the line from Dresden and the first station in the borders of the modern town of Radebeul. It was named Weintraube after the name of the nearby vineyard the Goldene Weintraube (golden bunch of grapes) and its similarly named inn. The innkeeper took the opportunity to open an inn next to the station called Kleine Weintraube (small bunch of grapes).

By the end of August of that year, 68,000 people had already had taken the "steam ride" to the Lößnitz, which took twelve minutes according to a contemporary lithograph. It names the locomotives that ran there as: Blitz, Bury and Comet and the passenger carriages as: Guttenberg, Gustav, Wittekind and Tell.

The 13.44 km-long section from Weintraube via Coswig to Oberau at the end of the now demolished Oberau Tunnel, which was still under construction, was opened on 16 September 1838. The Leipzig–Dresden railway was completed in 1839, it was duplicated in 1839 and 1840, Kötzschenbroda station was opened to the west in 1840 and Radebeul Ost station was opened further east in Radebeul in 1860. These latter two stations later gained freight facilities.

The first waiting room in the Lößnitz area was built at Weintraube station, which had to be replaced, however, with the introduction of running on the right in 1883. A new building with a pedestrian subway was opened in 1887, but it was demolished in 1972.

Trains stopped in Weintraube and in Kötzschenbroda only on certain days in the early years. The Kötzschenbroda timetable of 1876 indicates that not all of the 37 daily trains stopped in Weintraube, some of them stopped only "as required".

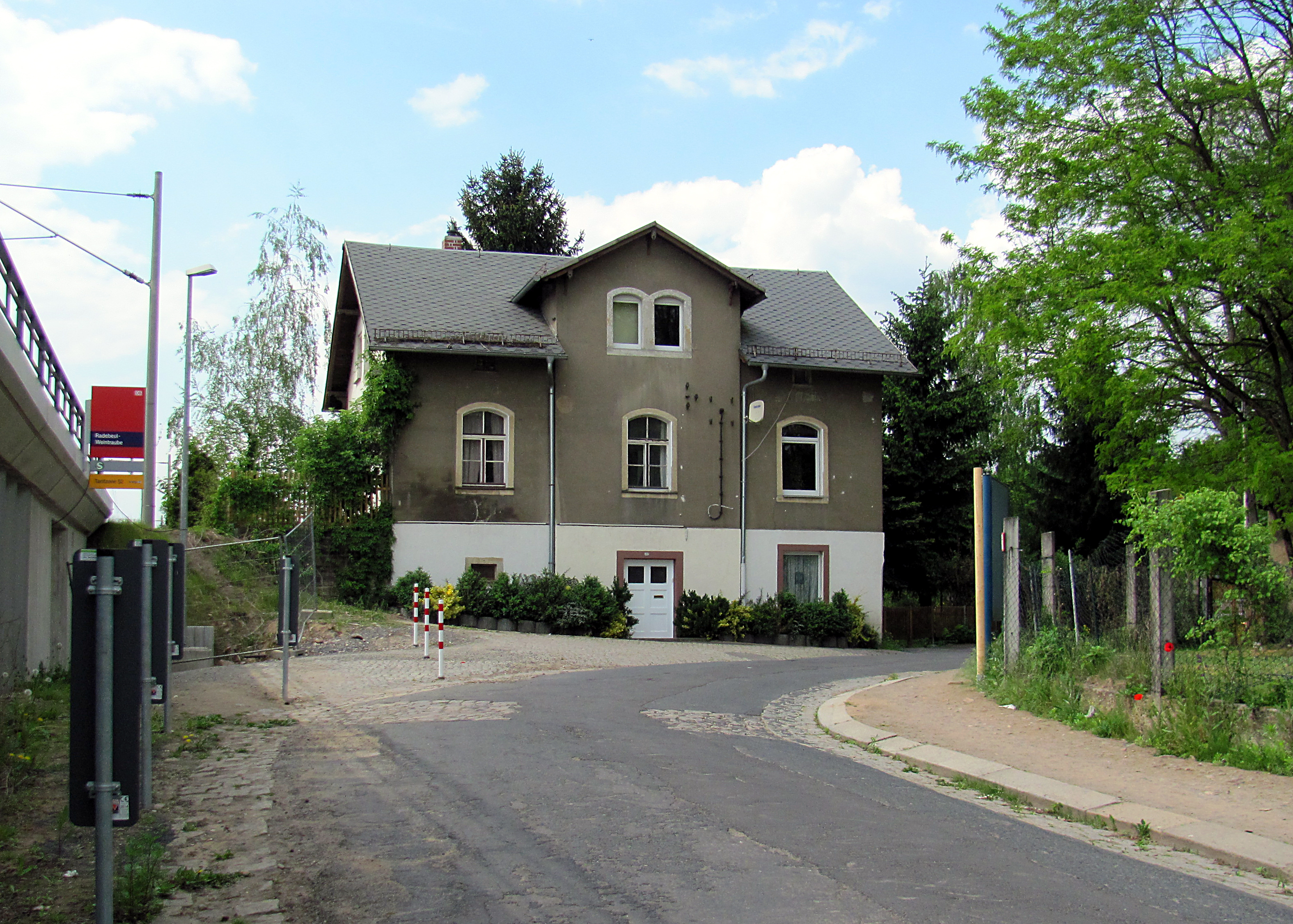
Former station building of 1898

The opera conductor Ernst von Schuch, who lived in nearby Niederlößnitz, commuted to work from Weintraube station for many years. A special train was put on for him, popularly known as the Schuch-Zug (Schuch train), that ran for each rehearsal.

Redevelopment of the railway as a four-track line began in 1900. The station was renamed after the surrounding village of Serkowitz on 1 May 1904 and, after the incorporation of Serkowitz into Radebeul, the original name of Weintraube was restored on 1 May 1905. The station has had its present name of Radebeul-Weintraube since 15 May 1934.

In 1945, after the Second World War, the three southerly tracks were dismantled for war reparations to the Soviet Union and only one platform remained in operation. Few trains stopped there, and often long-distance trains operated in one direction along the single track line.

In the early 1960s, the northern track was relaid and a central track was built in preparation for a future mixed-gauge operation with a correspondingly large clearance gauge so that it could handle Soviet broad-gauge wagons (1520 mm gauge). The run-down southern track was dismantled. Starting in 1982, the southern track was relaid and subsequently the other two tracks were rehabilitated. The middle track could be used for trains running in both directions, but they could not stop in Radebeul-Weintraube because it lacked a platform. Westbound traffic generally ran on the northern track and traffic to Dresden ran on the southern track. The middle track was used for express train running west to overtake or for a normal traffic towards Dresden.

From 2010 to 5 February 2012, services did not stop at the station, since only one track was available because of construction work. This caused constraints on the timetable. All trains ran through the area without stopping at up to 120 km/h.

Today, only services on line S 1 of the Dresden S-Bahn stop in Radebeul-Weintraube.

== Construction ==
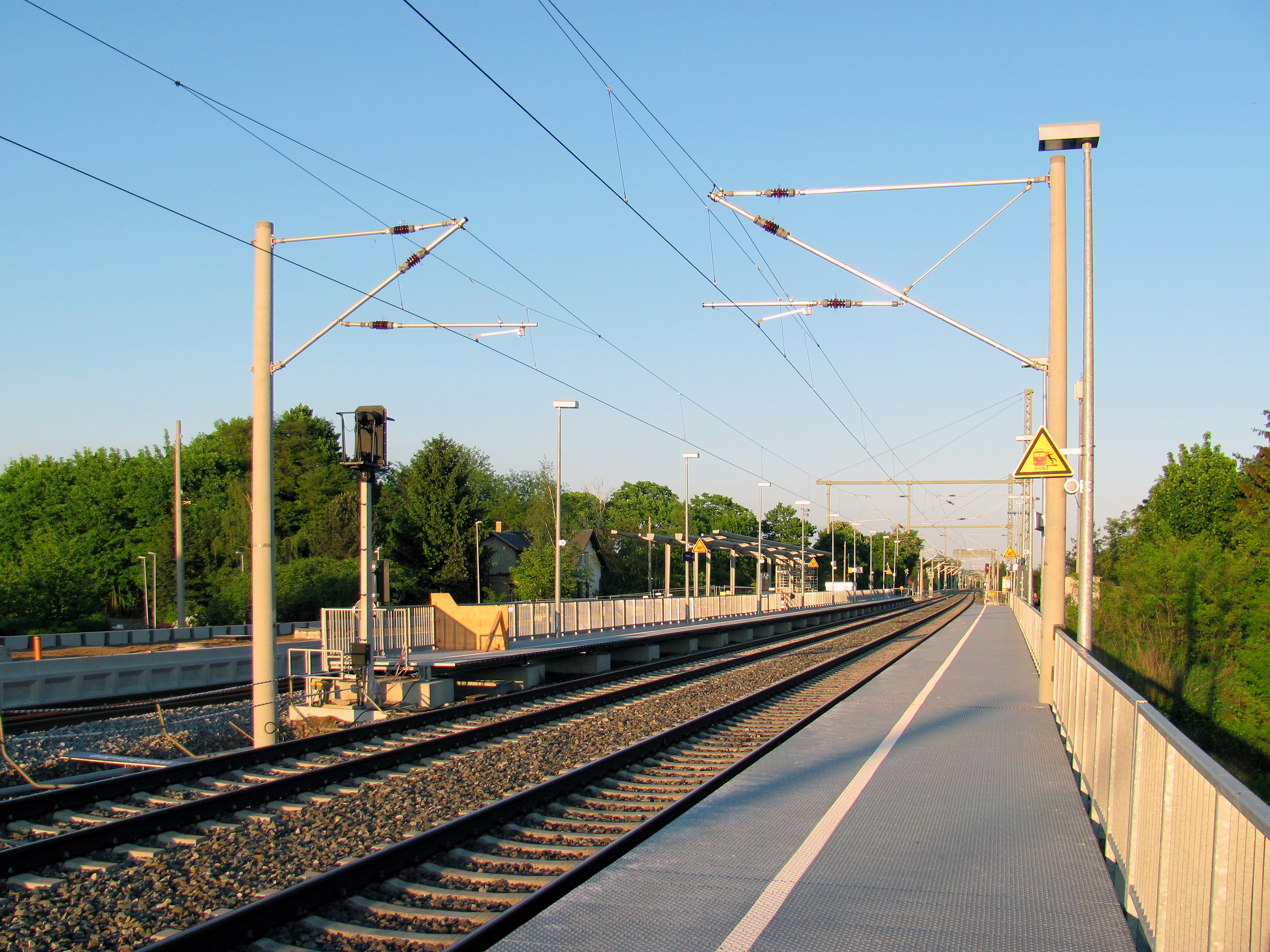
Radebeul-Weintraube during construction (2013) with temporary platforms on the already completed mainline tracks

Between 5 February 2012 and 17 November 2013, Radebeul-Weintraube station had two temporary platforms on the tracks that were subsequently operated as the long-distance tracks. The station now has an island platform with a lift and stairs.
