= Radebeul =

Town in Saxony, Germany

- Town
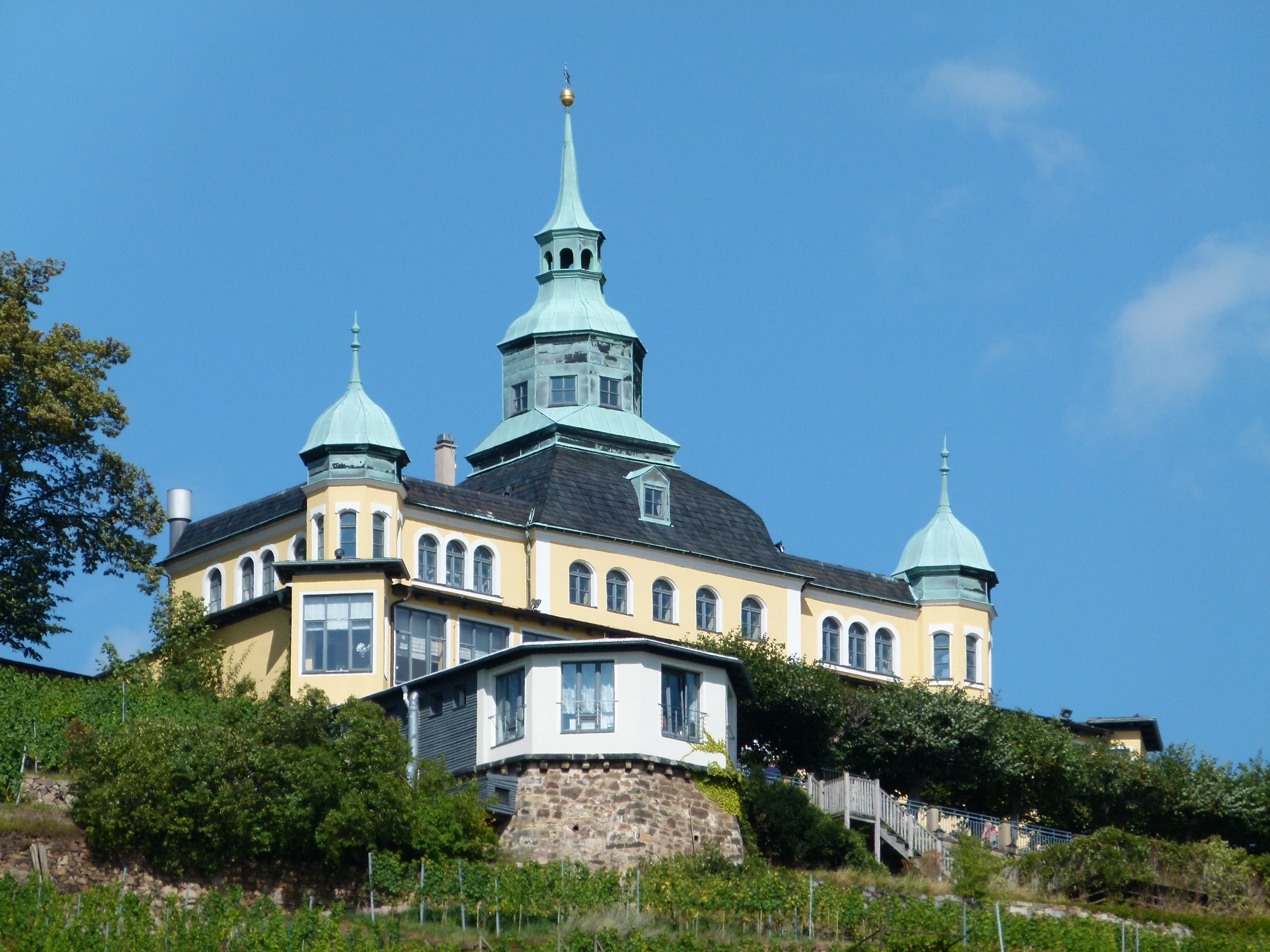
- Spitzhaus above the vineyards of Radebeul

- Coat of arms

- Location of Radebeul within Meißen district
- Interactive map of Radebeul
- Location within Germany Location within Saxony
- Coordinates: 51°06′N 13°39′E
- Country: Germany
- State: Saxony
- District: Meißen

Government
  - Mayor (2022–29): Bert Wendsche

Area
  - Total: 26.14 km^{2} (10.09 sq mi)
- Elevation: 101–256 m (331–840 ft)

Population (2025-12-31)
  - Total: 33,081
  - Density: 1,266/km^{2} (3,278/sq mi)
- Time zone: UTC+01:00 (CET)
  - Summer (DST): UTC+02:00 (CEST)
- Postal codes: 01435-01445
- Dialling codes: 0351
- Vehicle registration: MEI, GRH, RG, RIE
- Website: www.radebeul.de

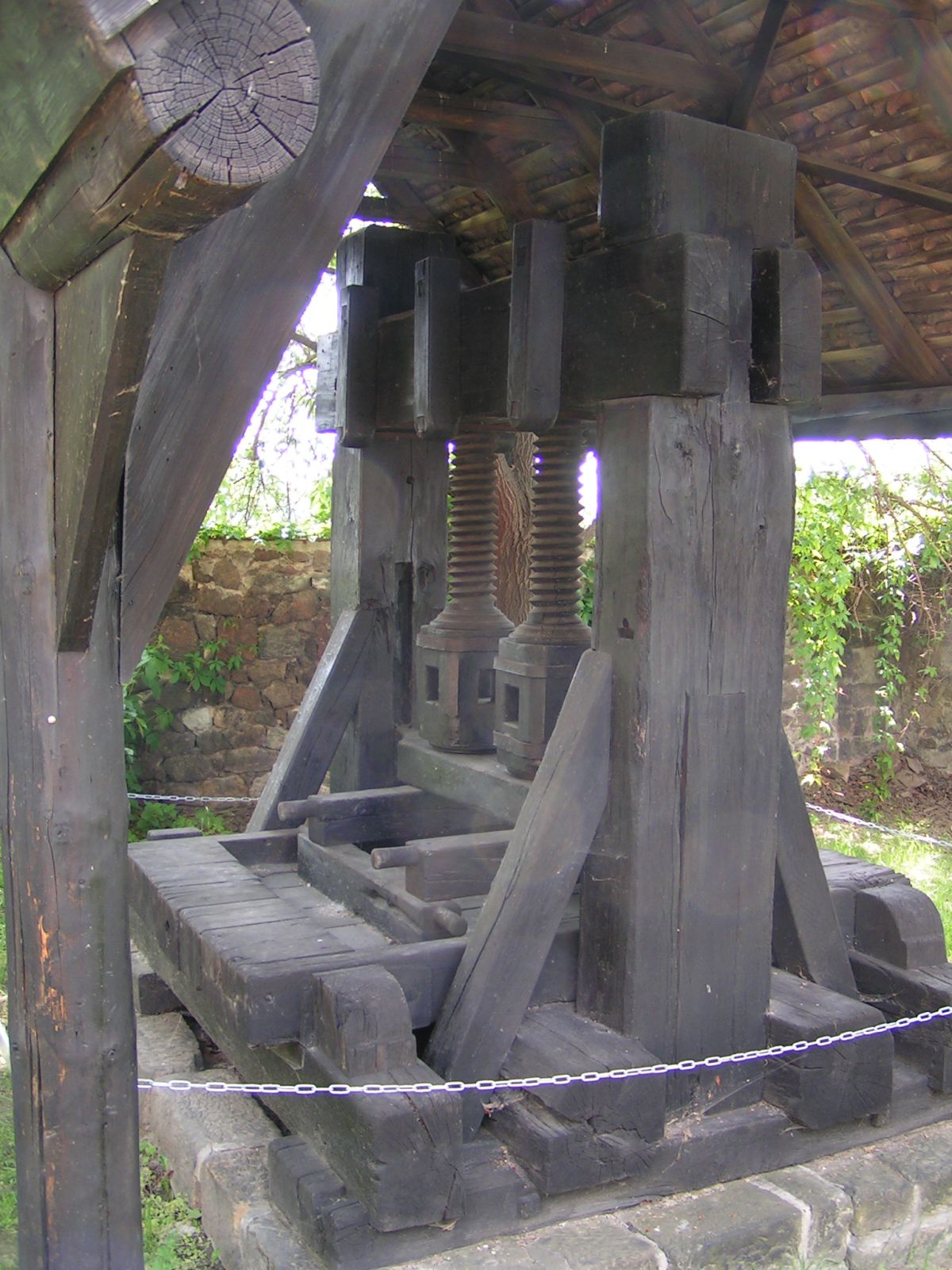
Antique wine press at the Hoflössnitz Castle in Radebeul

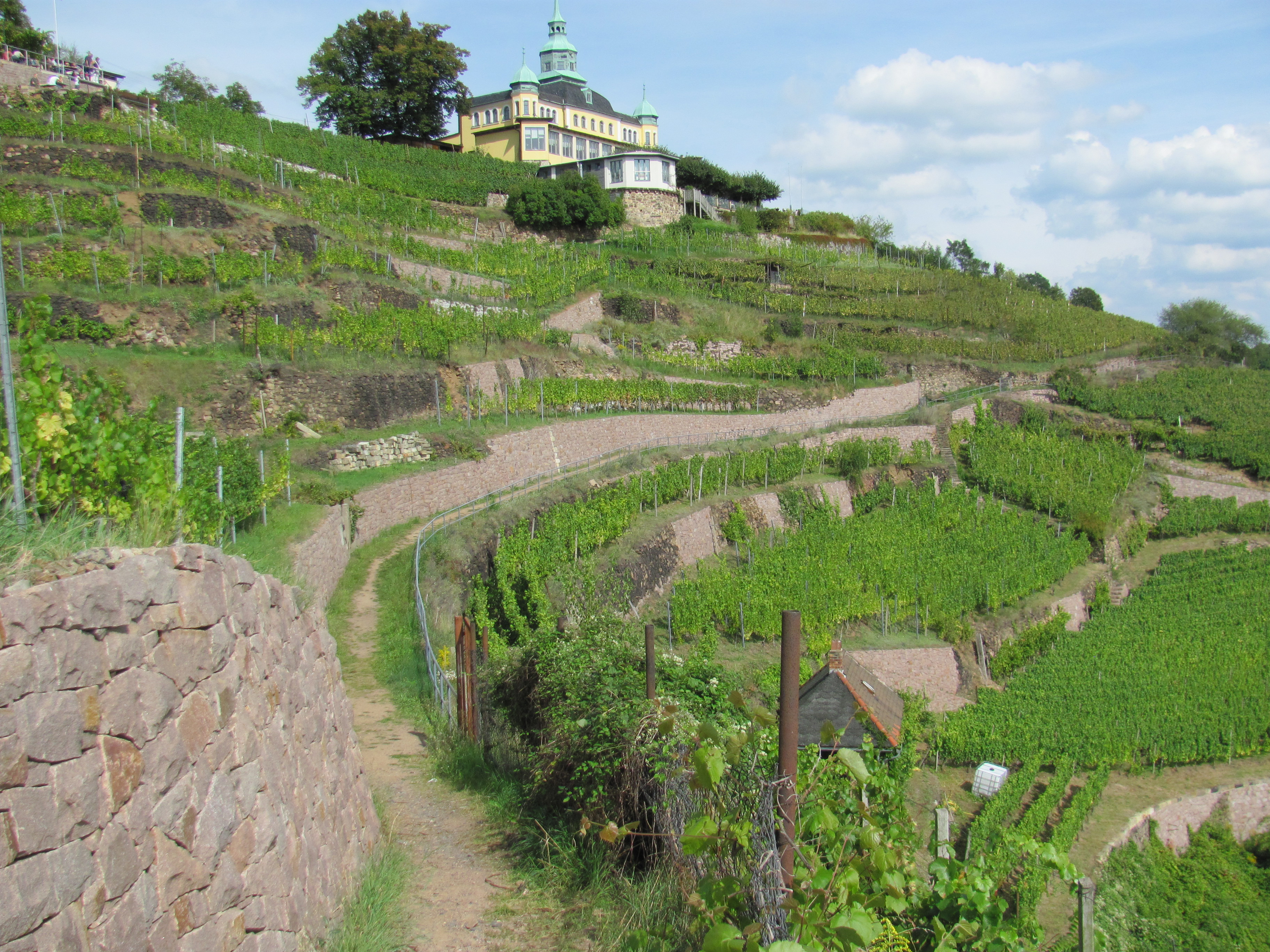
Vineyards of Radebeul

Radebeul (German pronunciation: [ˈʁaːdəˌbɔʏl]; Upper Sorbian: Radobyle) is a town (große Kreisstadt) in the Elbe valley in the district of Meißen in Saxony, Germany, a suburb of Dresden. It is well known for its viticulture, a museum dedicated to writer Karl May, and a narrow-gauge railway connecting Radebeul with the castle of Moritzburg and the town of Radeburg. The Meißen area, where Radebeul is located, is one of the northeasternmost areas where wine is grown in the 21st century.

It is sometimes called the "Nice of Saxony" for its pleasant landscape and mild climate.

== History ==
A village Radebeul was first mentioned in 1349. In 1905 it absorbed the neighboring village of Serkowitz. On 1 April 1924 Radebeul became a town.

Meanwhile, the neighboring village of Kötzschenbroda had taken over Lindenau in 1920, and Naundorf, Zitzschewig and Niederlößnitz by 1924, when it was made a town as well.

In 1934 Wahnsdorf and Oberlößnitz joined Radebeul, and on 1 January 1935 the towns of Kötzschenbroda and Radebeul were united under the name of Radebeul (As "Kötzschenbroda" had a Slavic root, this name was considered too "ungermanic" at the time). In 1947 Radebeul was made part of the district of Dresden.

In 1995 Radebeul was named a major town inside the rural district (große Kreisstadt). When the rural district of Dresden (Dresden-Land) was dissolved, Radebeul became part of the district of Meißen.

== Transport ==
The town can be reached by Dresdner Verkehrsbetriebe tram route 4 or by Dresden S-Bahn line S1, which serves four stations in Radebeul (Radebeul Ost, Radebeul-Weintraube, Radebeul Kötzschenbroda and Radebeul-Zitzschewig) on the Pirna–Coswig railway. Deutsche Bahn's Regional-Express 50 service also stops at Radebeul Ost. It is also the terminus of the historic Radebeul–Radeburg narrow-gauge steam railway and the station closest to the Karl May Museum.

== Public services ==
The volunteer fire department of Radebeul was founded in 1897. While volunteer, it is considered the oldest department of the city government. Today the volunteer fire department of Radebeul consists of four separate quarter departments: Radebeul-Ost, Kötzschenbroda (Naundorf), Lindenau and Wahnsdord. Each of the departments has his own junior firefighter section. The quarter department of Radebeul-Kötzschenbroda was founded 2008 in the course of the construction of a rescue central station in Radebeul West. In the process the volunteer fire departments of Radebeul-West and Naundorf were consolidated. The rescue central station also houses the "Technisches Hilfswerk Radebeul".

In 2011 the departments counted 136 members in total, 99 on active duty and 37 members in the elderly and honor department. The junior firefighter section had overall a number of 64 young members.

In 2012 the department raised money to create a flag of honor. The assets cost (including gear) totaled a sum of around 12000 Euro, which were gathered through donations (citizen and companies alike). Every donator was allowed to sign one of the flag nails with his name. Fundraising took place from March to the end of July 2012, and the flag was made in September.

The flag consecration took place at the 08.11.2012. The departments of Meißen, Moritzburg and Coswig were invited to this ceremony. The flag consecration sponsorship was picked up by the county fire fighter organization of Meißen. The president of the parliament of Saxony, Dr. Rößler, was patron. The flag is stored at the city hall in Radebeul.

== Twin towns – sister cities ==
Radebeul is twinned with:

- Cananea, Mexico
- Obukhiv, Ukraine
- Sankt Ingbert, Germany
- Sierra Vista, United States

== Notable people ==
- Karl May (1842–1912), author, lived and died in Radebeul
- Walter von Boetticher (1853–1945), historian and physician, died in Radebeul

=== Honorary citizens ===
- Martin Mutschmann, 1933
