= Coswig (b Dresden) station =

Railway station in Saxony, Germany

Coswig (Bz Dresden)
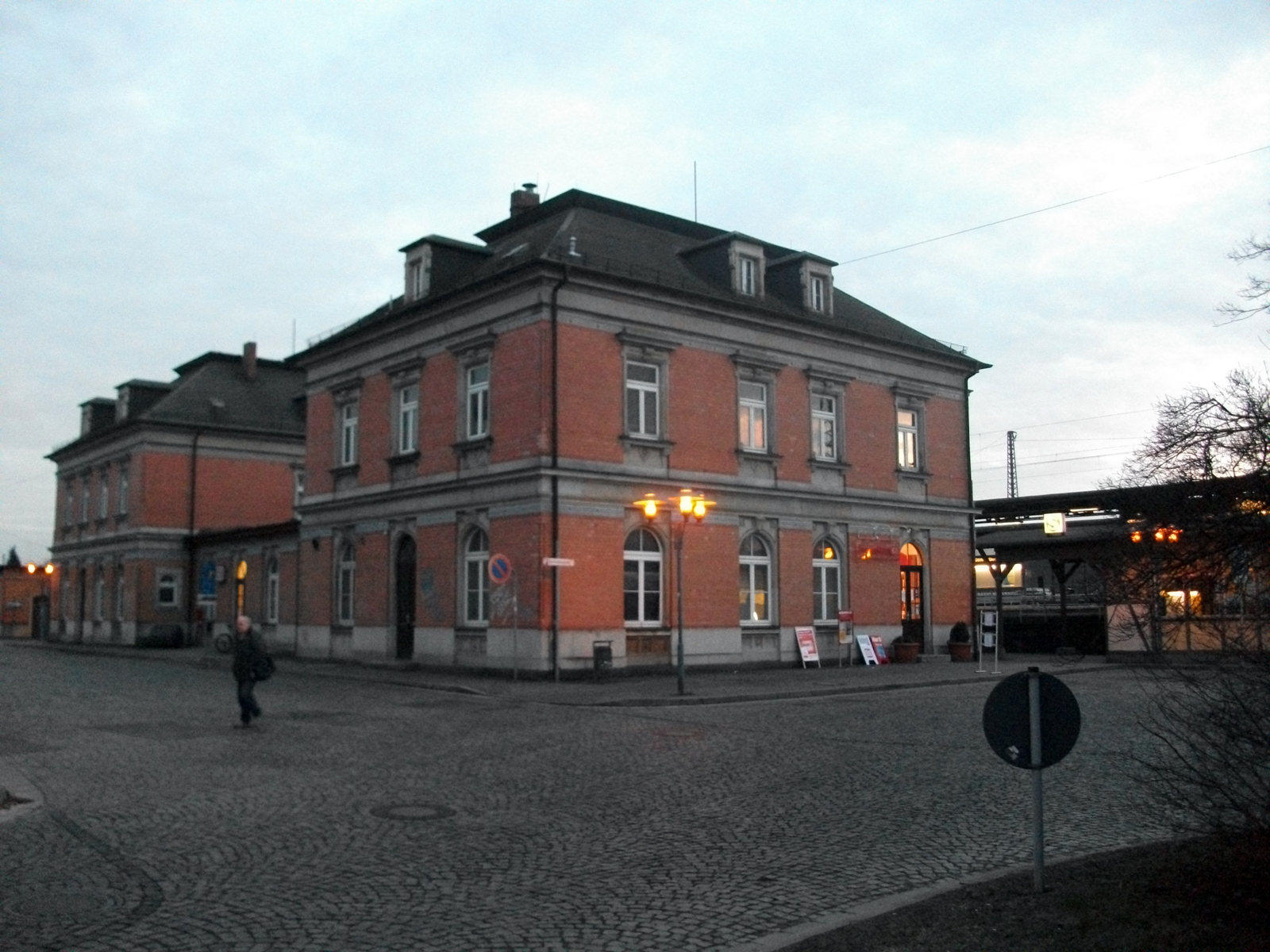
- Entrance building

General information
- Location: Coswig, Saxony; Germany
- Coordinates: 51°07′23″N 13°34′47″E
- Lines: Leipzig–Dresden (km 101.926); Borsdorf–Coswig (km 104.171); Radebeul-Naundorf–Coswig (km 1.95); Pirna–Coswig (S-Bahn) (km 35.09)
- Platforms: 5

Construction
- Accessible: Yes

Other information
- Station code: 1076
- DS100 code: DCW
- IBNR: 8010072
- Category: 3
- Website: www.bahnhof.de

History
- Opened: 1 December 1860

Services
Preceding station	DB Regio Nordost	Following station
Dresden-Neustadt towards Dresden Hbf	RE 15	Weinböhla towards Hoyerswerda
Dresden-Neustadt towards Dresden Hbf	RE 18	Weinböhla towards Cottbus Hbf
Radebeul-Naundorf towards Dresden Hbf	RB 31	Weinböhla towards Elsterwerda-Biehla
Preceding station	DB Regio Südost	Following station
Weinböhla towards Leipzig Hbf	RE 50	Radebeul Ost towards Dresden Hbf
Preceding station	Dresden S-Bahn	Following station
Neusörnewitz towards Meißen Triebischtal	S 1	Radebeul-Zitzschewig towards Schöna
Location

Coswig (b Dresden) station is a railway station in Coswig in the German state of Saxony. The station, which opened on 1 December 1860, is at the junction of the Borsdorf–Coswig railway, which terminates here, the Leipzig–Dresden railway, the Pirna–Coswig railway and a connecting curve from the Berlin–Dresden railway. In passenger transport it is served by Regional-Express and Regionalbahn services and by the Dresden S-Bahn. The station is classified as a cultural monument.

== History ==
At the opening of the section of the Leipzig–Dresden railway that passes through Coswig on 16 September 1838, the Leipzig–Dresden Railway Company had not built a station in Coswig. Nearly two years later, on 10 June 1840, the Coswig "stopping point" (Anhaltepunkt) was opened, which was about 900 metres from the location of the present station towards Leipzig. The first formal Coswig station was built with the opening of the branch line from Coswig to Meißen (now part of the Borsdorf–Coswig railway). Both were opened on 1 December 1860. This station was located between kilometer points 101.60 and 101.75 of the Leipzig–Dresden railway.

When connected to the railway network, Coswig developed into an important industrial community. This growth and technical progress meant that the construction of a new station building was required 30 years later. The new station building was built between 11 September 1893 and 4 June 1894. This building is still used as the entrance building. In addition, the railway tracks were rebuilt at a higher level and an island platform was built, which was connected by a pedestrian subway.

Due to its function as a junction station, some long-distance services stopped at the station for a long time, most recently in the mid-1990s, when occasional InterRegio services stopped at the ends of the day. Since then, passenger operations have been limited to commuter services. The long-distance services have generally run over the newly built Weißig–Böhla railway since 2010 and thus bypass Coswig Station to the east.

New passenger platforms with a height of 55 centimetres above the top of the rails were built between 2012 and 2015.

=== Station name ===
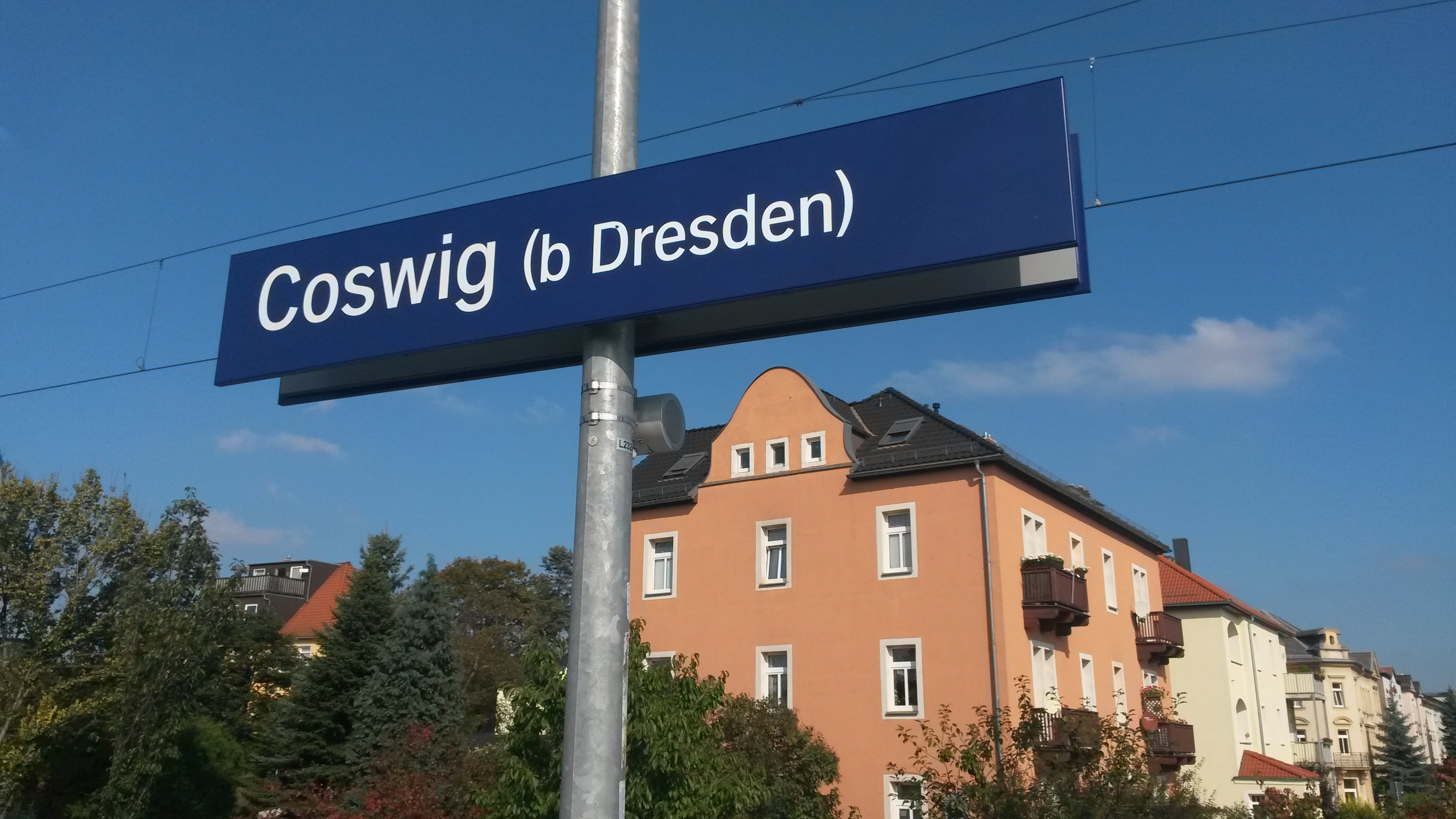
Station sign at "Coswig (b Dresden)" station

During its existence, the station has borne the following names:

- from 1 December 1860: Coswig
- from 1 July 1911: Coswig (Sa)
- from 4 October 1925: Coswig (Bez Dresden)
- from 31 March 1934: Coswig (Bz Dresden)
- from 14 December 2014: Coswig (b Dresden).

The current name means "Coswig near Dresden".

== Rail services ==
The station is on served by passenger services RE 15: Hoyerswerda–Dresden, RE 18: Cottbus–Dresden, RE 50: Leipzig–Dresden and RB 31: Elsterwerda-Biehla–Dresden and by Dresden S-Bahn line S1: Meissen-Triebischtal–Schöna (as of September 2014).

Line	Route	Frequency (min)	Operator
RE 15	Dresden Hbf – Dresden Mitte – Dresden-Neustadt – Coswig (b Dresden) – Großenhain Cottb Bf – Ruhland – Hoyerswerda	120	DB Regio Nordost
RE 18	Dresden Hbf – Dresden Mitte – Dresden-Neustadt – Coswig (b Dresden) – Großenhain Cottb Bf – Ruhland – Cottbus	120	DB Regio Nordost
RE 50	Dresden Hbf – Dresden Mitte – Dresden-Neustadt – Coswig (b Dresden) – Riesa – Leipzig Hbf	60	DB Regio Südost
S 1	Meißen-Triebischtal – Coswig (b Dresden) – Dresden-Neustadt − Dresden Hbf – Pirna – Bad Schandau – Schöna	30	DB Regio Südost
RB 31	Dresden Hbf – Dresden-Friedrichstadt – Coswig (b Dresden) – Großenhain Cottb Bf – Elsterwerda – Elsterwerda-Biehla	60	DB Regio Nordost

== Description of infrastructure ==
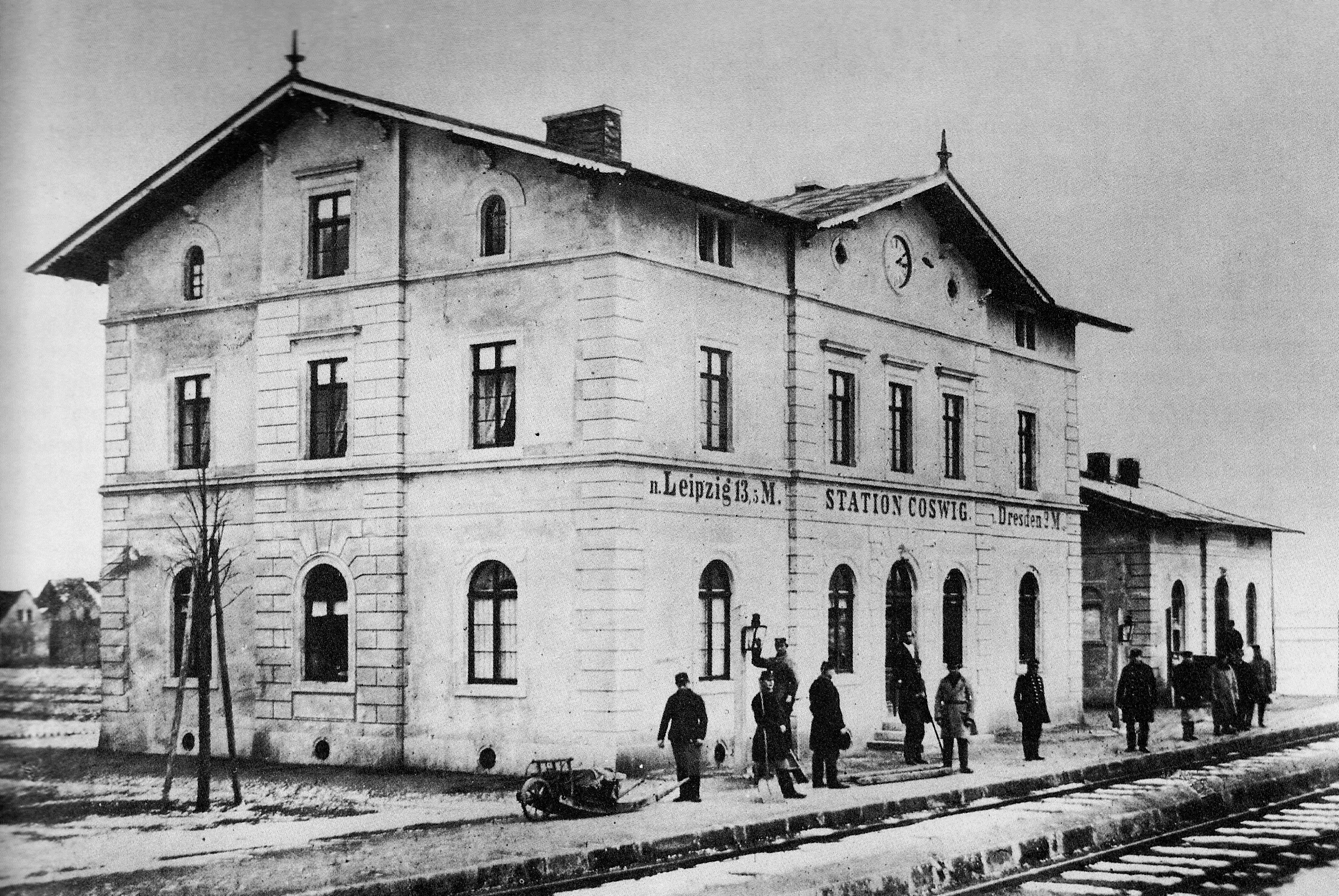
The first station building in 1860

=== Station building of 1860 ===
The station building of 1860 is built in the typical style of Saxon railway buildings as a plain stucco building with an avant-corps-like central section. It is built in ashlar with its facade decorated with plaster. It has been remodeled for residential purposes since the construction of the new station building and it is used as a residence. It still exists today.

=== Station building from 1894 ===
The station building from 1894 is a brick building with Renaissance Revival and eclectic elements with stone-accented corners, cornices and window surrounds and it has some Art Nouveau elements.
