= Dresden Leipzig railway station =

First railway station in Dresden, Germany

Dresden Leipzig Railway station
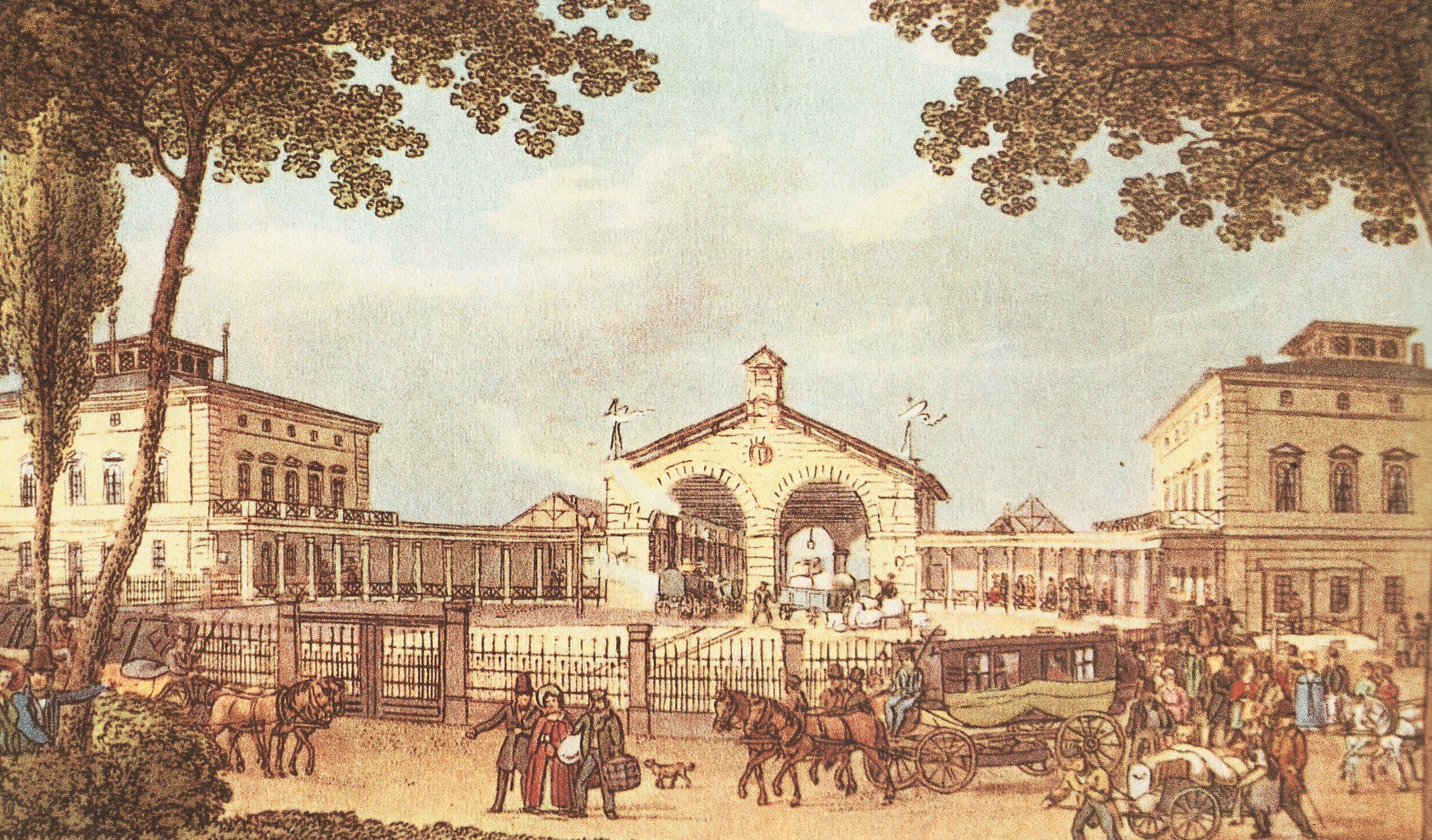
- Head building of the "Leipzig railway station" in Dresden (1839)

General information
- Location: Leipzig suburb, Dresden, Saxony; Germany
- Coordinates: 51.065710°N 13.737363°E
- Elevation: DE-SN
- System: Railway Station
- Line: Leipzig–Dresden railway

History
- Opening: 1839
Location

The Leipzig station was the first railway station in Dresden, the capital of Saxony. It was located not far from today's Dresden-Neustadt station in the Leipzig suburbs and was the terminus of the first German long-distance railway Leipzig–Dresden, which was inaugurated in 1839.

The rapid increase in traffic volume and the connection to newly built railway lines made significant expansions as well as conversions and new buildings necessary in the first decades of its existence. With the extensive redesign of Dresden's railway facilities at the end of the 19th century, the station finally lost its function for passenger traffic, which was henceforth taken over by the newly built Dresden-Neustadt station. The freight transport facilities, on the other hand, continue to be used today as the Dresden-Neustadt freight station.

== Location and surroundings ==
The Leipzig station was located in a northeast-southwest direction between Großenhainer and Leipziger Straße. To the southwest, the former Leipziger Platz originally bordered the railway facilities; today Eisenbahnstraße marks the end of the railway site. Towards the northeast, the railway expanded over time and reached its greatest extent shortly before today's Pieschen junction.

== History ==
=== In the operation of the Leipzig-Dresden Railway Company ===
Due to the more favourable topographical conditions, the board of directors of the Leipzig-Dresden Railway Company (LDE) decided to route the railway line between Dresden and Riesa on the right bank of the Elbe. Consequently, the Dresden terminus, the Leipzig station, had to be chosen on the Neustadt side of the Elbe, although this was generally considered disadvantageous. In 1837 construction work began on the station and from the 19th century onwards. July 1838 the station facilities were used for railway operations. From Dresden, trains initially ran on the already completed section to Weintraube, and from 16 August onwards. September 1838 to Oberau. However, the Leipzig station was not inaugurated until the ceremonial opening of the entire line to Leipzig on 7 April 1839, almost nine months after the start of operations.

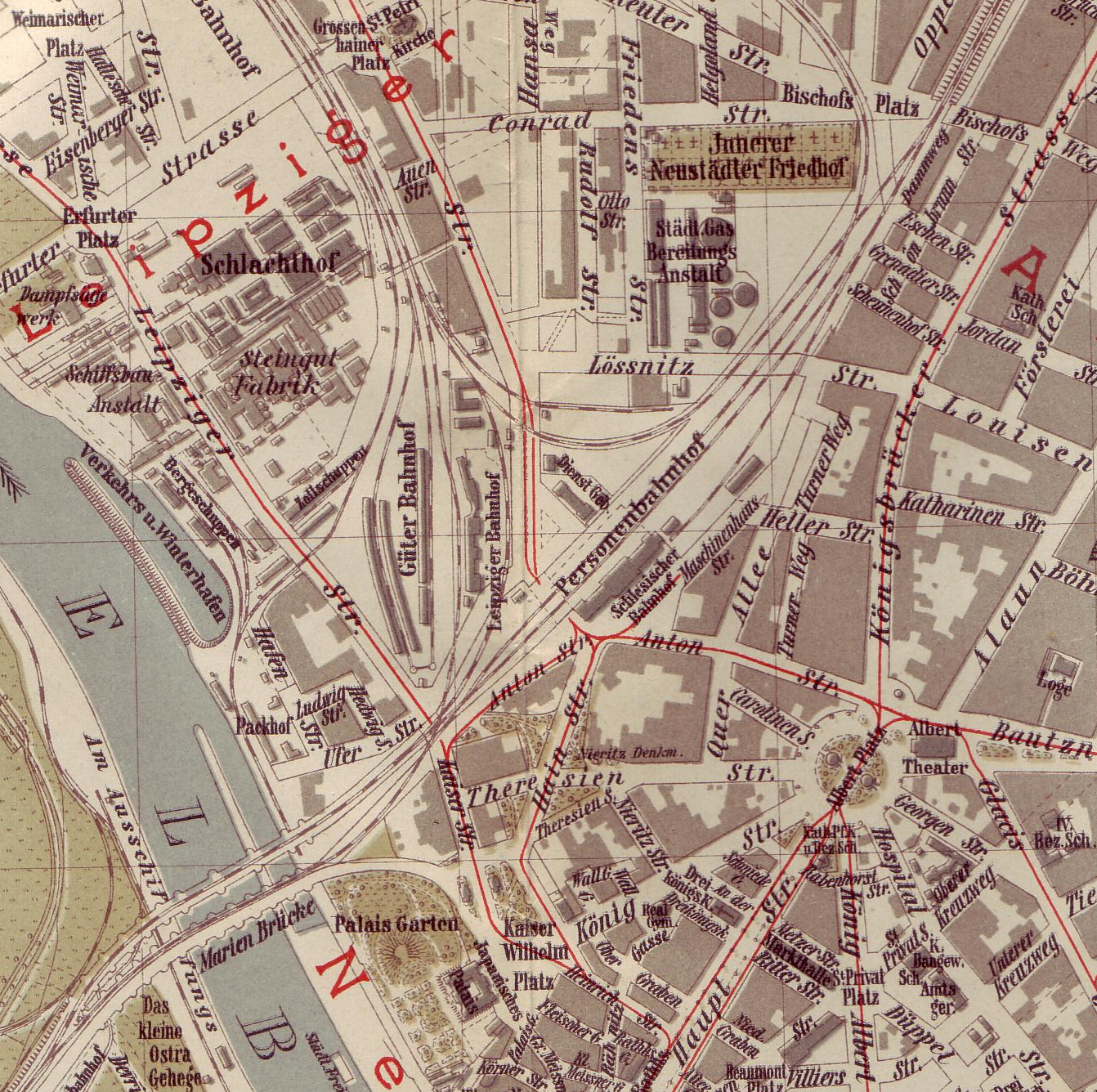
Leipzig and Silesian Railway Station around 1900

In 1846, the downhill main track in the direction of Leipzig favoured an invention in railway operation: gravity was used for the first time to shunt wagons at Leipzig station. A locomotive pulled the wagons to be shunted onto the inclined track and after setting the appropriate points, the wagons were unrolled onto the desired track. This principle is still used today at marshalling yards with a Drainage hill.

The Dresden–Görlitz railway, which opened on 1 September 1847, ended at the neighbouring Silesian Railway Station. The acute-angled position of the two stations in relation to each other did not allow for an operationally satisfactory connection. Nevertheless, a connecting track was built that connected the freight yard of the Schlesischer Bahnhof with the track apron of the Leipzig station. There, a turntable established the connection.

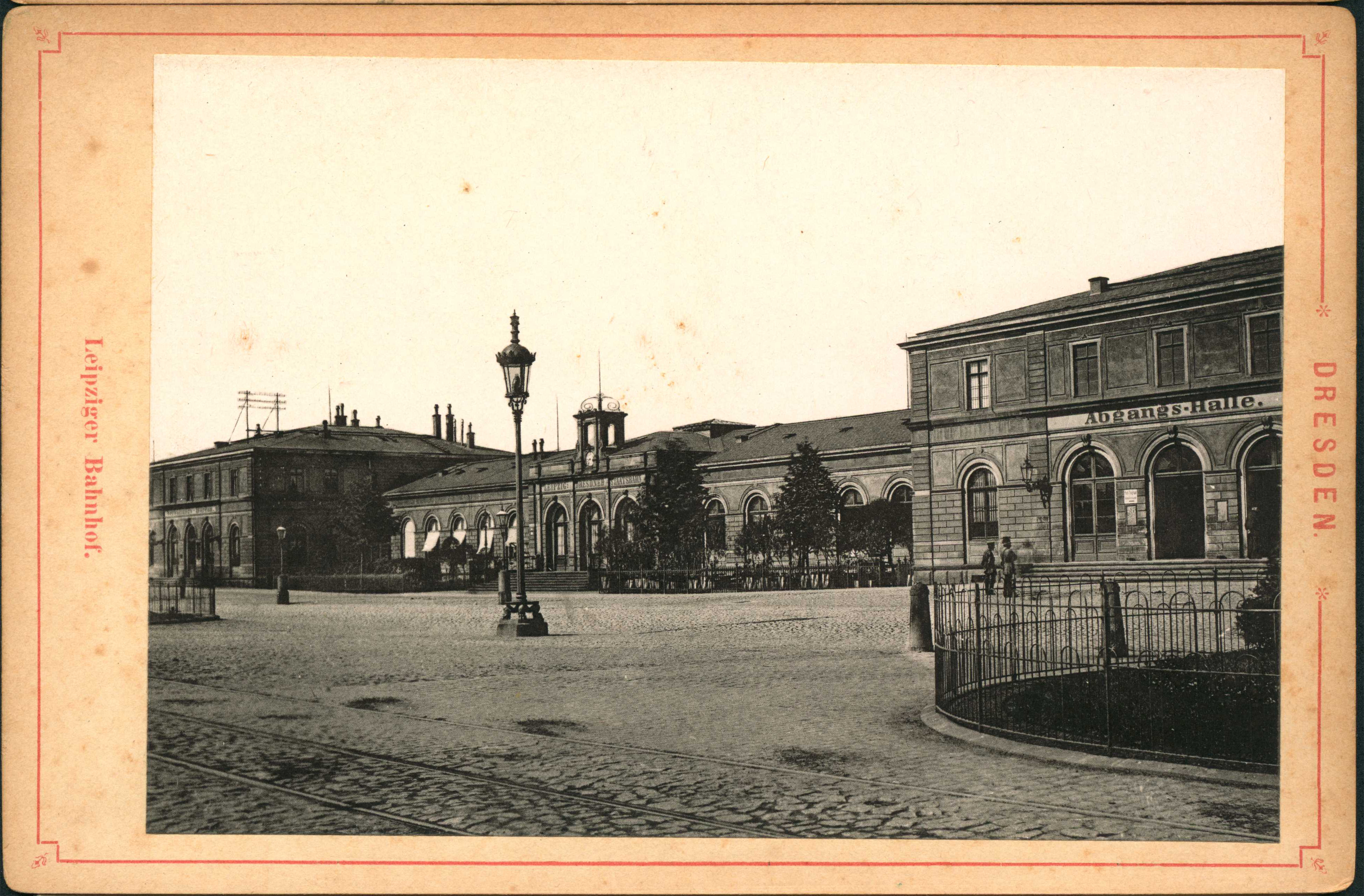
Station building ca. 1885

Soon, however, Leipzig's first station was too small and outdated. In 1847, the LDE rebuilt the railway facilities for the first time and erected a new, laterally arranged station building. Before 1852, the station received further new buildings, but these cannot be precisely classified chronologically, namely a machine house, two goods sheds, a customs shed, and a carriage shed. Shortly afterwards, the station underwent another major expansion and redesign from 1852 to 1857. The much larger reception complex, which was inaugurated on 19 May 1857 on the departure of King Johann, his wife Queen Amalie, and his children Sidonie and Sophie to Italy, remained in operation until the redesign of the Dresden railway facilities at the turn of the century.

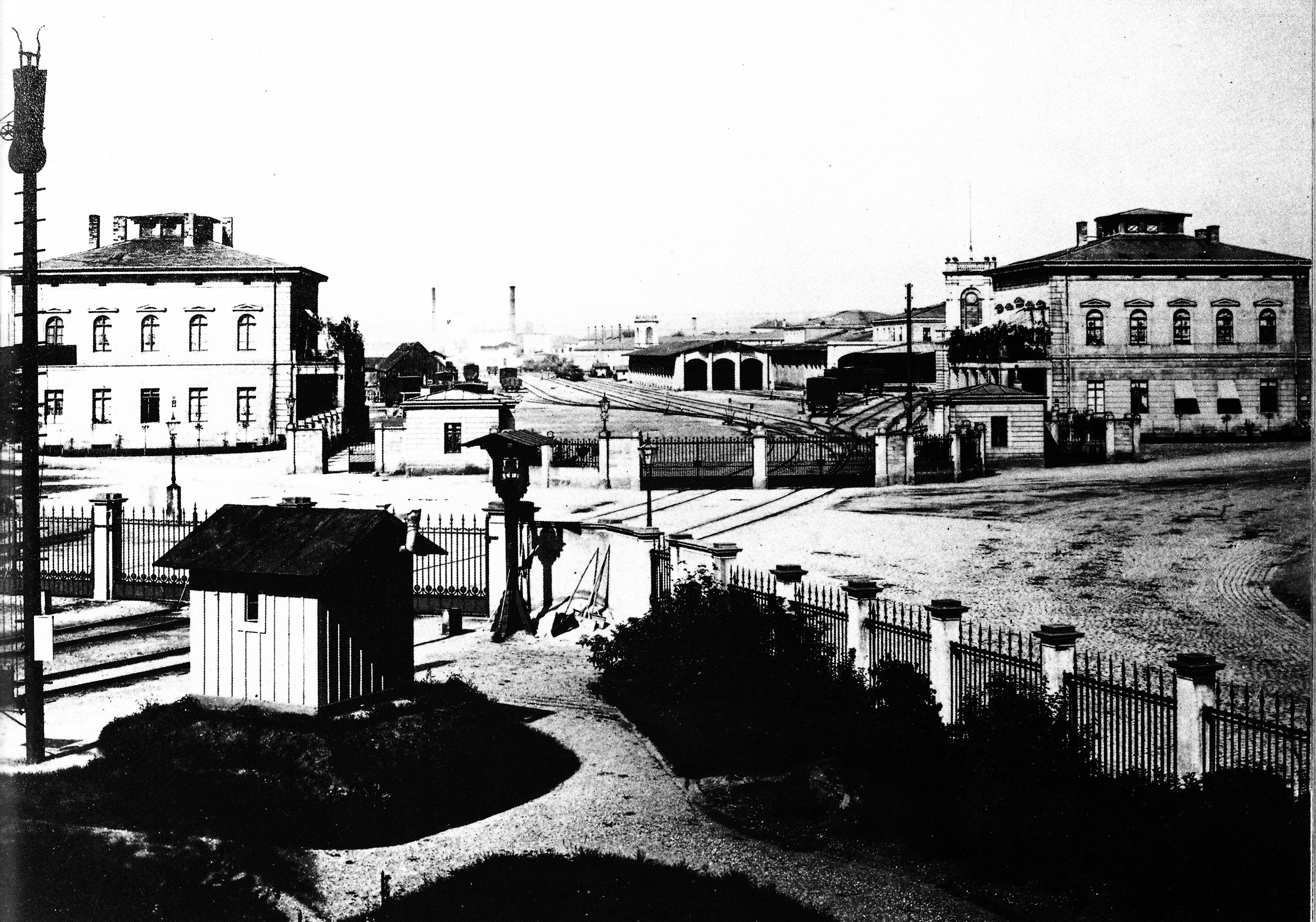
The station head in 1861; the connecting tracks in the foreground led over the Marienbrücke to the Saxon-Bohemian State Railway (Dresden–Bodenbach)

The reconstruction of the railway facilities at short intervals was due, among other things, to the significant increase in traffic volume. From three pairs of trains a day at the opening, the traffic volume grew to 44 passenger trains (56 in the summer) and 20 to 24 freight trains with 170 axles each per day by 1876. The total cargo throughput at Leipzig station in that year was almost 275,500 tons. In addition, both operating processes and equipment were still subject to a rapid process of change in the first decades of the railway. For example, the turntables used in the first station, with a diameter of only 3.4 m, could not be used for long.

Since 1852, there had been a railway connection between the Leipzig and Silesian stations on the Neustadt side of the Elbe and the stations on the Old Town side of the Elbe via the newly built Marienbrücke. This made direct connections Leipzig–Dresden–Prague–Vienna possible.

The operating facilities were renovated in 1868/1869. The new machine station consisted of a rectangular locomotive shed with 25 stands, a workshop with 20 stands, a coal shed and a coaling plant. Later, a roundhouse for twelve engines was added. With this, the facilities of the Leipzig station reached their greatest extent. The two locomotive sheds and the workshop building were retained until 2010.

=== After the nationalization of the LDE ===
On 1 January 1876, the Saxon state acquired the Leipzig-Dresden Railway. From then on, through trains ran between Leipzig and Bodenbach and the directional functions of the station's halls had to be partially abandoned. The structural substance of the station, on the other hand, was retained after the transfer to state ownership until the redesign of the Dresden railway junction.

This took place from 1892 to 1901 and required the demolition of the facilities furthest into the city. Since then, Eisenbahnstraße has bordered the railway facilities on this side. On 1 March 1901, the Bodenbach-Leipzig express train 2, which arrived at Leipzig station at 3:55 a.m. and continued towards Leipzig at 4:00 a.m., marked the end of passenger services at Leipzig station.

=== Continued operation as Dresden-Neustadt freight yard ===
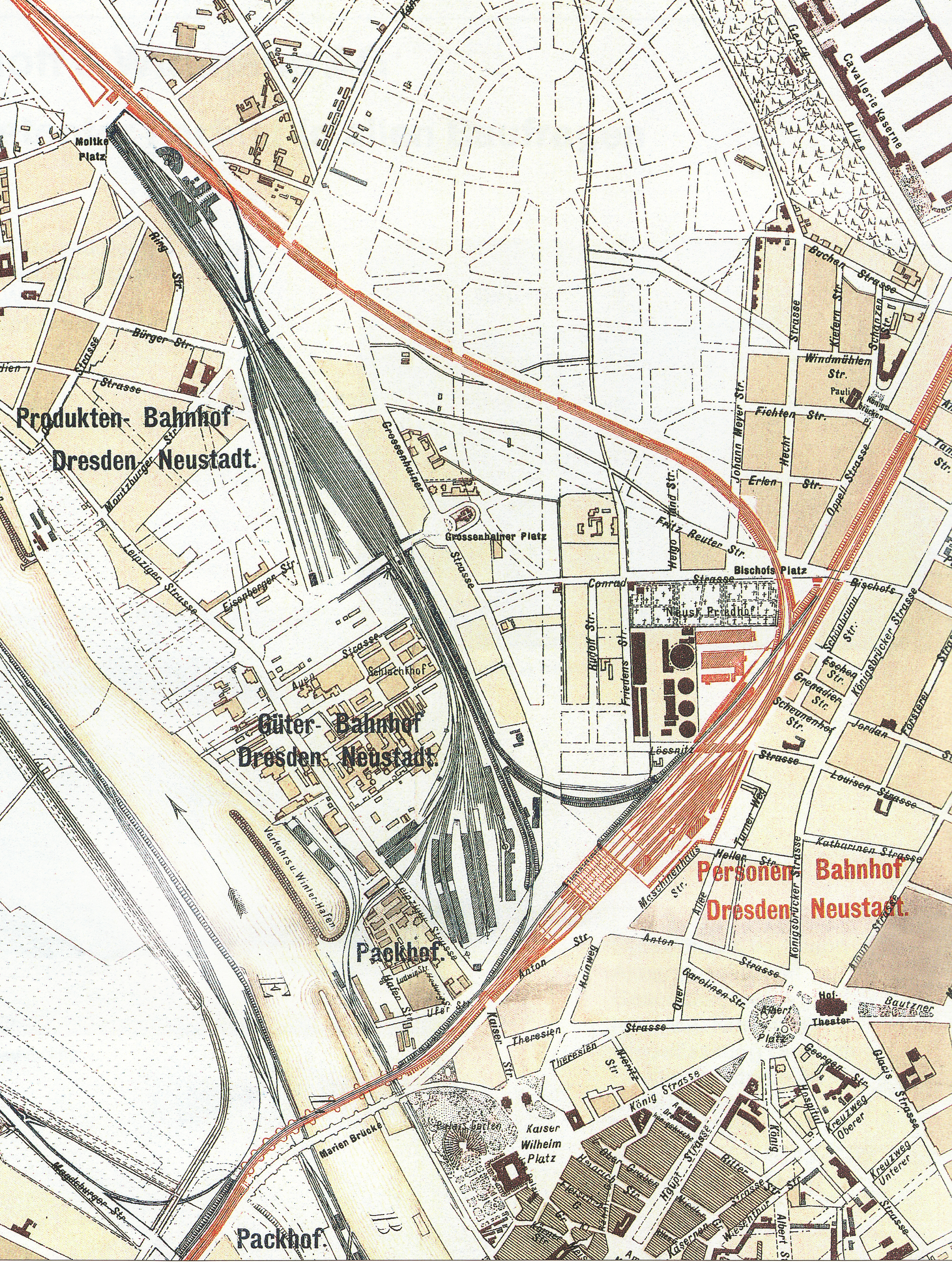
Design planning of the railway facilities of the passenger station and the freight station Dresden-Neustadt (1895)

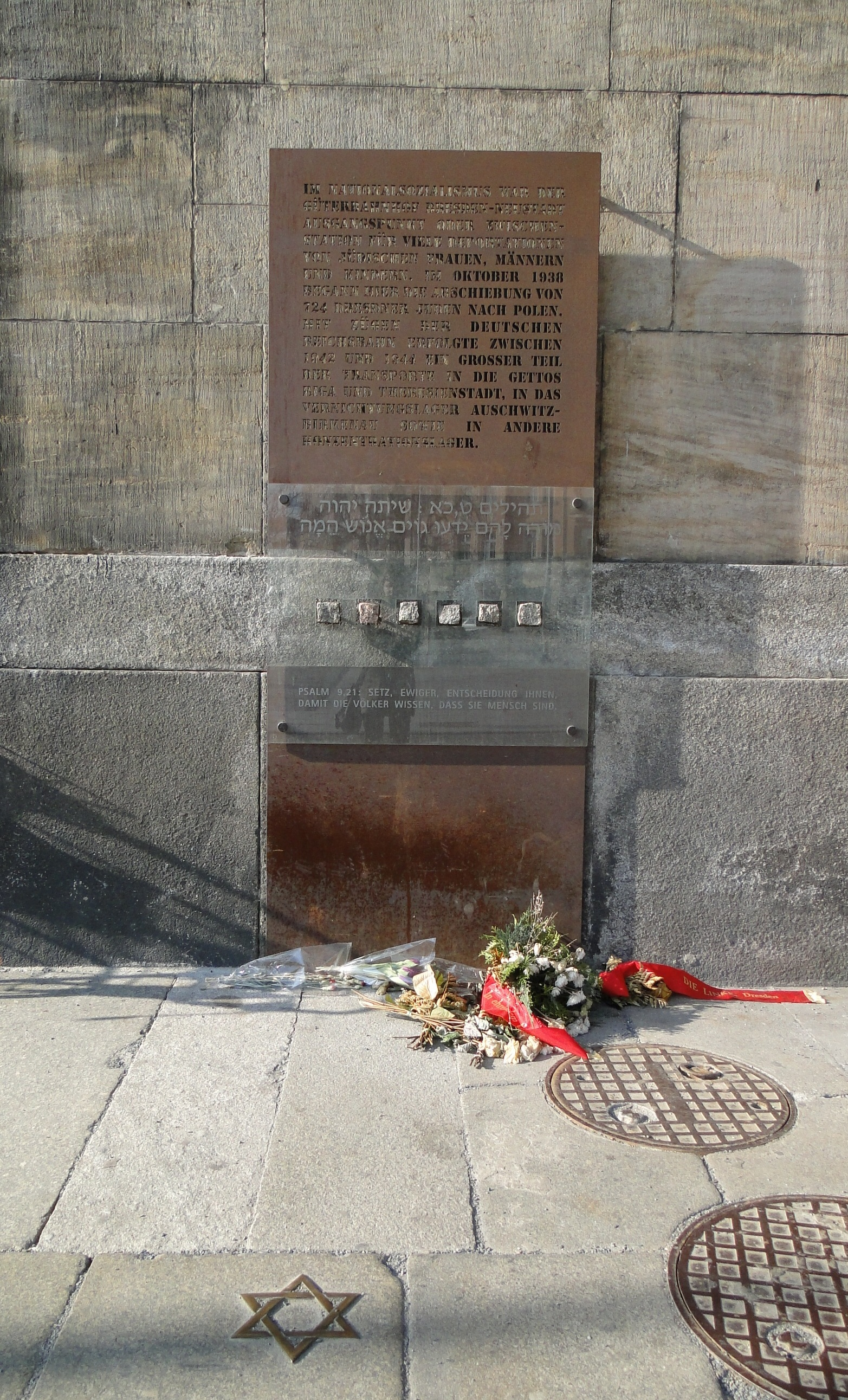
The deportation of Jews via the Neustadt freight station is commemorated by a memorial plaque and a Star of David in the footpath in front of the right entrance of the neighboring Dresden-Neustadt passenger station.

Converted into the Dresden-Neustadt freight station, the majority of the railway facilities continued to be used. The buildings taken over from the Leipzig station buildings were mainly used for general cargo handling, but mail and express freight trains also ended there. In addition, the station served local freight traffic, took over the operation of the Neustadt Elbe quays and partly handled long-distance freight traffic to and from Upper Lusatia. In local freight traffic, transfer runs linked the Neustadt freight yard with the Dresden-Friedrichstadt marshalling yard. Shunting locomotives distributed the wagons in Dresden-Neustadt and ran local freight trains to Coswig, Radebeul and the industrial area in Albertstadt.

During the Second World War, the Dresden-Neustadt freight station was the starting point for two deportation trains. On January 21, 1942, a train with 224 Jews from the administrative district of Dresden-Bautzen left the station in unheated freight cars and reached the Riga ghetto four days later. Just over a year later, on March 3, 1943, 293 Jews from Dresden were loaded onto another transport. They had previously had to do forced labor at Zeiss Ikon AG and lived in barracks in the Hellerberg Jewish Camp. The destination of the second transport with a total of 1500 deportees from different places was the Auschwitz-Birkenau concentration camp. Immediately after arrival, about 820 of them died in the gas chambers.

During the air raids on Dresden in 1945, several incendiary bombs hit the former station building; two parts of the building were then demolished.

In 1968, a container terminal (Dresden-Neustadt container station) with two gantry cranes was opened on Gehestraße. For a long time, it was the only facility of its kind in the greater Dresden area and from then on served as the starting and ending point for block train container traffic via Berlin to the overseas port of Rostock.

As late as 1989, a reconstruction of the destroyed parts of the building was planned, they were to be used for a centralization of express goods handling. However, the fall of the Berlin Wall put an end to these plans and represented a turning point in the history of the freight station. The service of the sidings and warehouses on the banks of the Elbe in Neustadt came to a complete standstill and general cargo traffic decreased significantly, as did postal traffic. In container traffic, only the main traffic direction initially changed and the terminal primarily handled east-west traffic. On 2 November 2005, however, the new container terminal in the Dresden-Friedrichstadt freight centre took over container handling. The terminal in Dresden-Neustadt no longer met the current performance standards and was closed.

== Subsequent use and outlook ==
In the future, the area around Neustädter Hafen could be redeveloped as part of the proposed Leipziger Vorstadt – Neustädter Hafen master plan. On the site of the Leipzig train station, Globus SB-Warenhaus Holding is planning a self-service store as well as other service providers and gastronomic facilities. In the former station building of the Leipzig train station, a small List museum is planned. The Globus project is controversial in Dresden, on the one hand the fallow site would be revitalized and the former station building could be handed over to a new use in accordance with monument protection, on the other hand the city already has a dense range of grocery stores and discounters, which fears cut-throat competition. In addition, another large food market opened in July 2015 with the Edeka at the high-rise building on Albertplatz, 700 meters away.

== Description ==
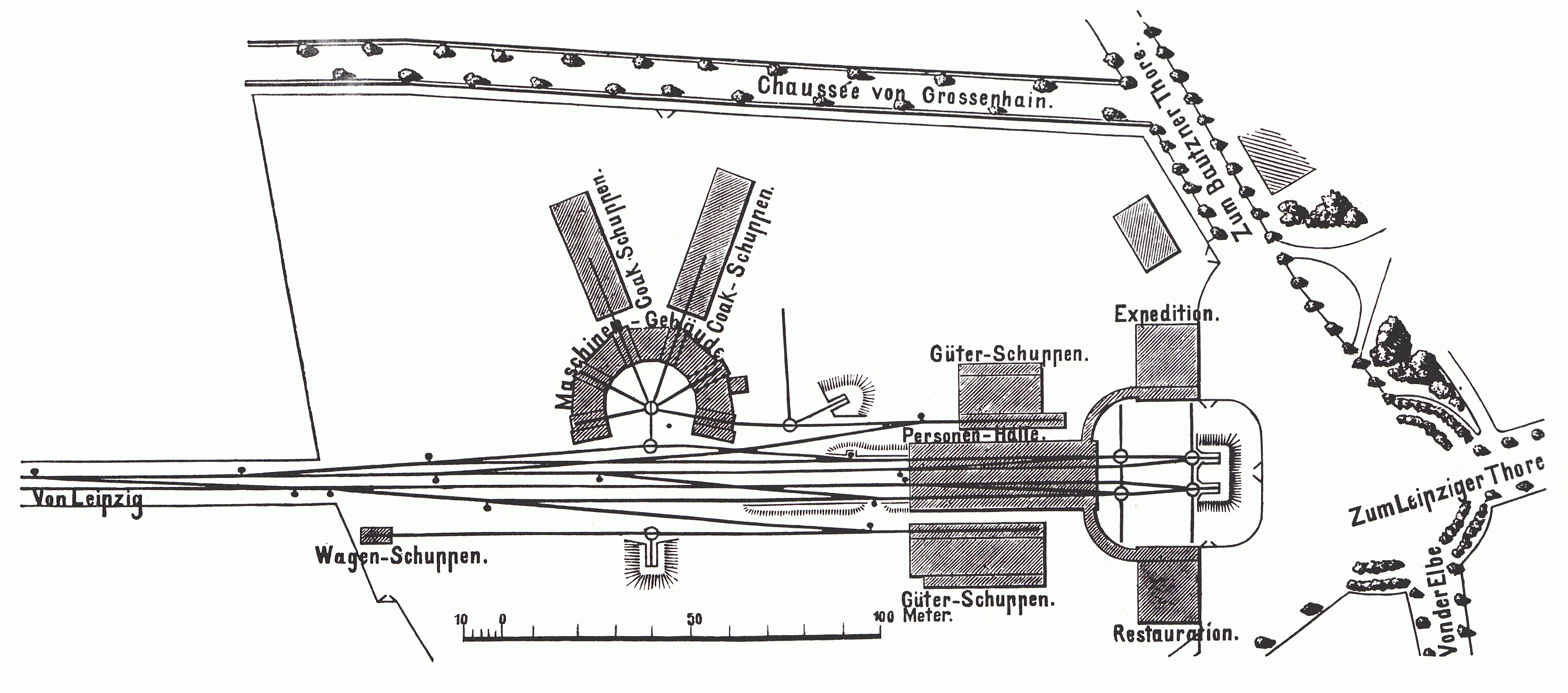
Site plan of the Leipzig station from the opening year 1839

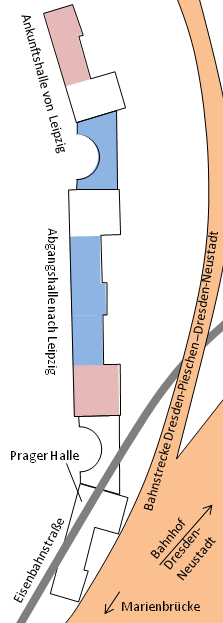
Overview of the surviving parts of the station complex (pink: renovated and in use; blue: in need of renovation or ruins; white: not preserved)

Located in the residential city, the station was designed to be particularly representative compared to the other stations on the line. The first station was built in the classicist style. Cubic two-storey buildings with attached mezzanines flanked the forecourt with its turntables on both sides. This pavilion-like type of building was widespread in Classicism. A stylistically very similar building that is still preserved today is the Luisium Castle, built by Friedrich Wilhelm von Erdmannsdorff.

== Dresden-Pieschen locomotive depot ==
The facilities of the Dresden Leipziger Bahnhof machine station were merged into the Dresden-Pieschen locomotive depot in 1899. Initially responsible for the use of steam locomotives in suburban traffic, the steam locomotive period only lasted until 14 November 1933. In particular, the large machine shed with a rectangular floor plan favoured the use of the facilities for the stationing of railcars, which were henceforth based in the Dresden-Pieschen locomotive depot. In addition, railway vehicles (for example, for transporting locomotives and wagons by means of road rollers) and diesel locomotives were also stationed here. The first eight railcars VT 137 058–137 065 stationed in Dresden-Pieschen ran fast trains on the two routes to Leipzig as well as those to Chemnitz, Görlitz and Zittau. Other classes followed, but with the beginning of the Second World War, the operation of the internal combustion engine railcars had to be discontinued due to a lack of fuel. The air raids on Dresden on 13. February and 17 April 1945 led to the extensive destruction of the facilities as well as some railcar sets still parked there.

In the post-war years, the railcar hall was provisionally restored in wooden construction and vehicles that were no longer operational were refurbished. In the summer timetable of 1947, the first post-war operations of the Dresden railcars took place. From 1963 onwards, the first new diesel locomotives of the DR class V 180 were housed in the depot and ensured an improvement in the quality of passenger train traffic. However, the Dresden-Pieschen locomotive depot was inadequately equipped for the maintenance of the V 180. The stationing of these locomotives was therefore transferred to the Dresden-Friedrichstadt locomotive depot, which had already been intended to house the modern types of traction during construction.

On 25 September 1965, the Dresden-Pieschen locomotive depot used pre-war diesel railcars for the last time before it was disbanded at the turn of the year 1965/66. From then on, the facilities were used by the Dresden Motor Vehicle Depot (Kbw Dresden), which was responsible for the maintenance and repair of the railway's own motor vehicles. Since its dissolution in the early 1990s, the buildings have stood empty and fallen into disrepair; from the end of 2010 they were demolished.

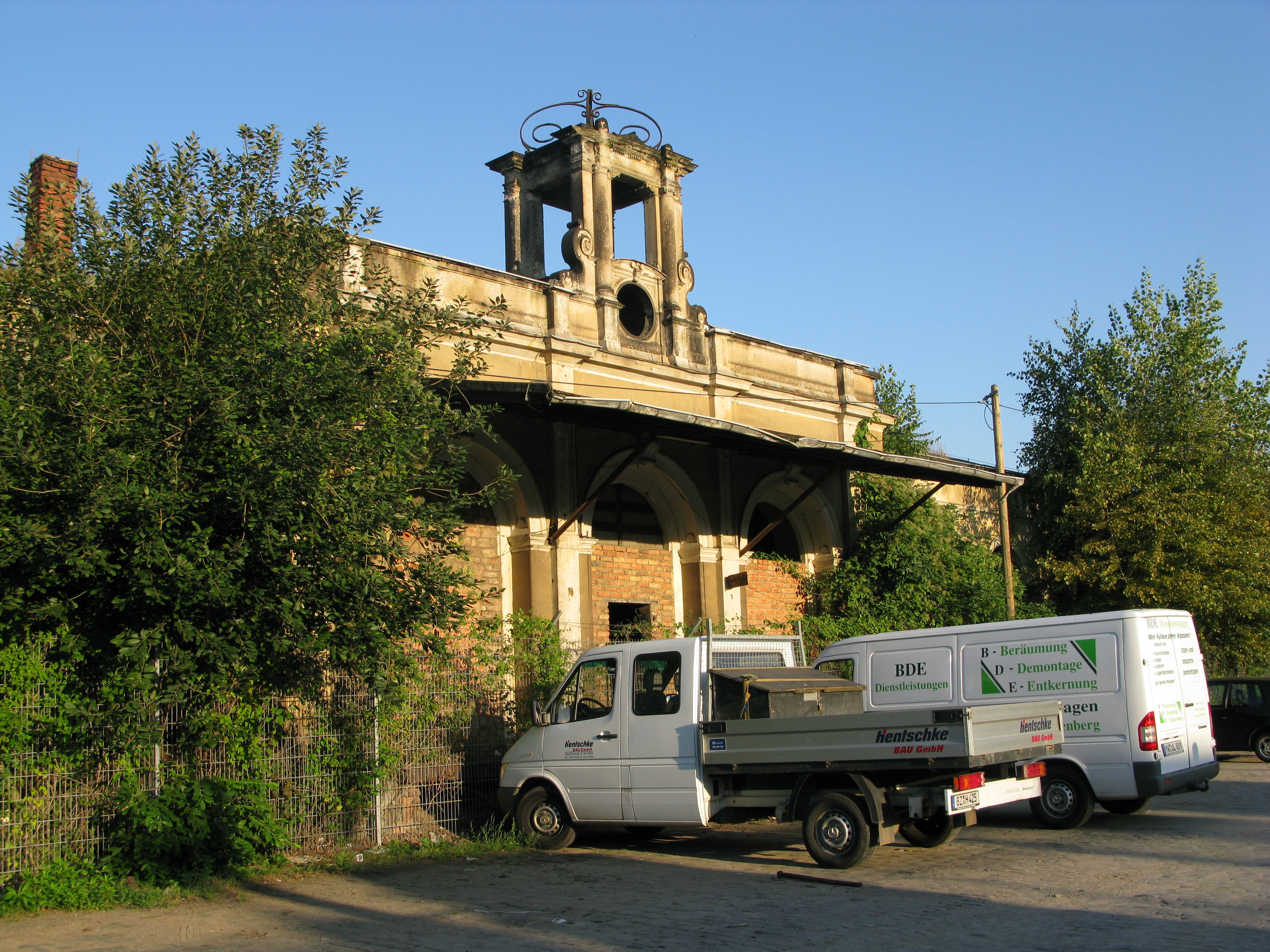
Main entrance of the station building from 1857 (2009)

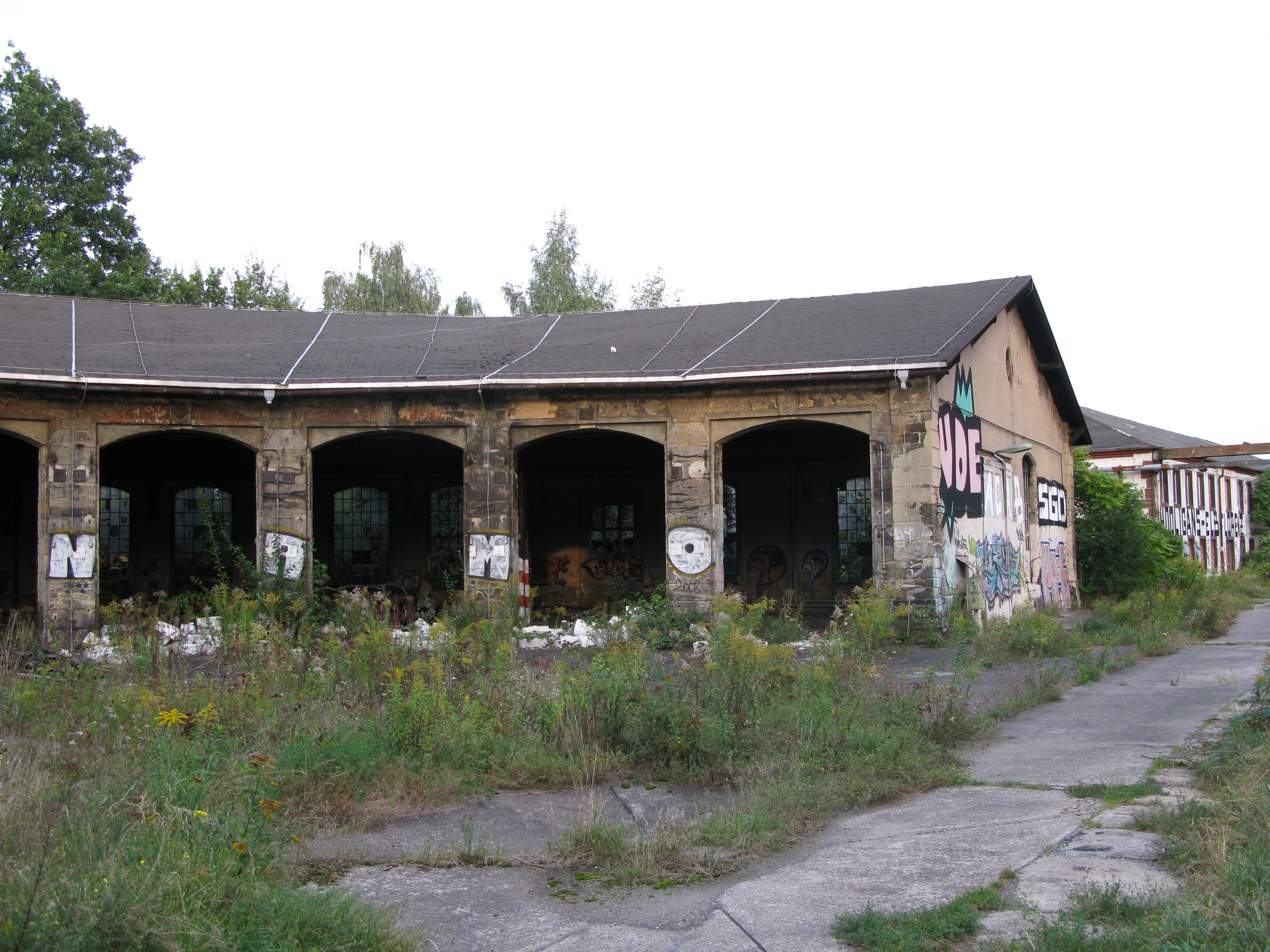
The now-demolished roundhouse from 1869 was only a ruin in 2009.

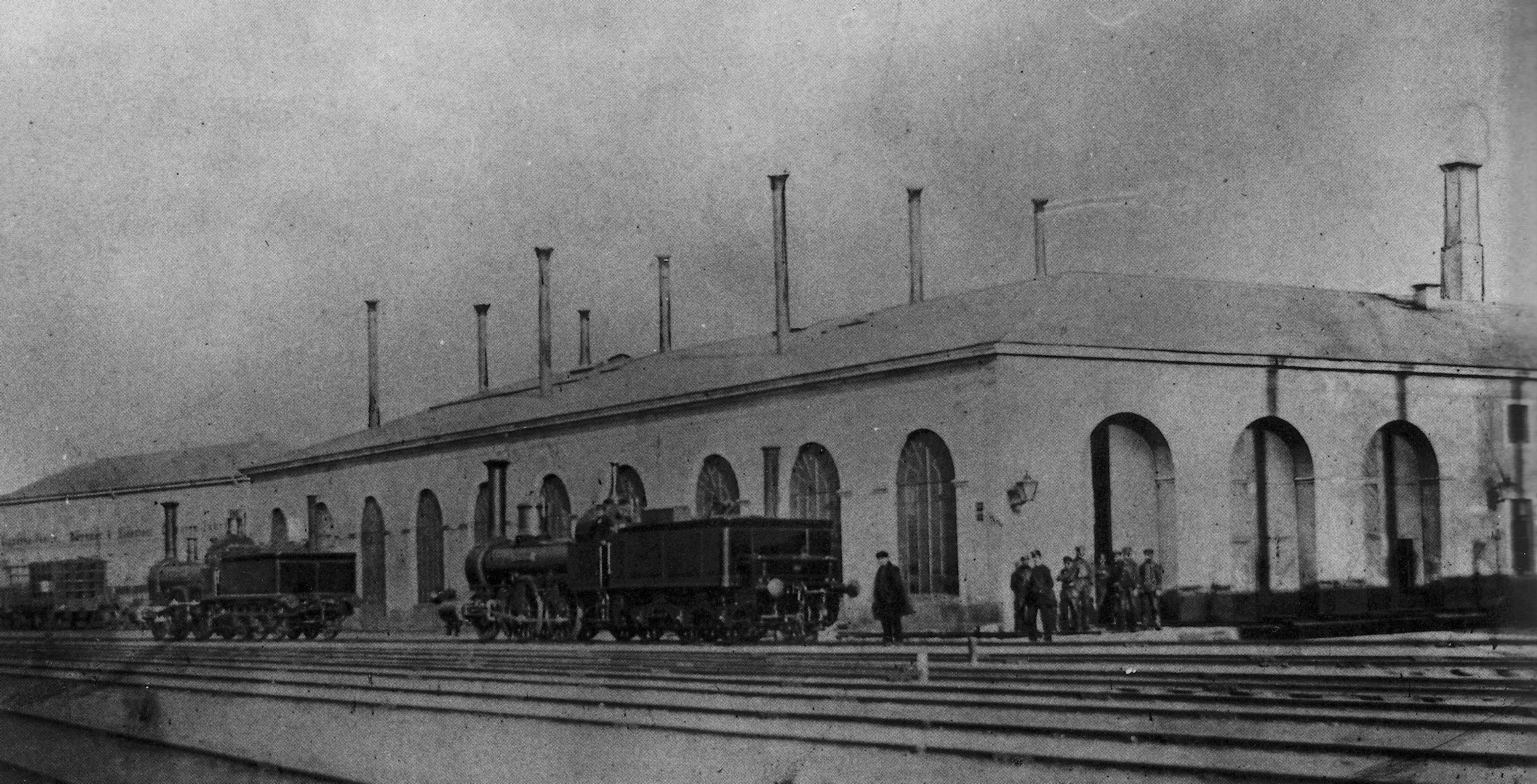
Machine house from 1852 (around 1860)

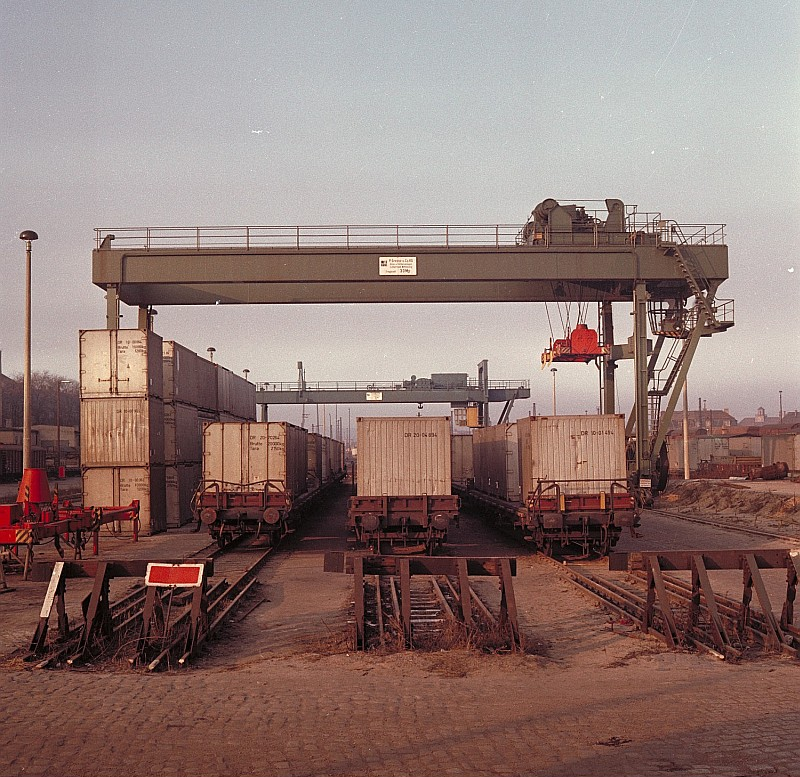
Container-Terminal am Güterbahnhof Dresden-Neustadt (1972)

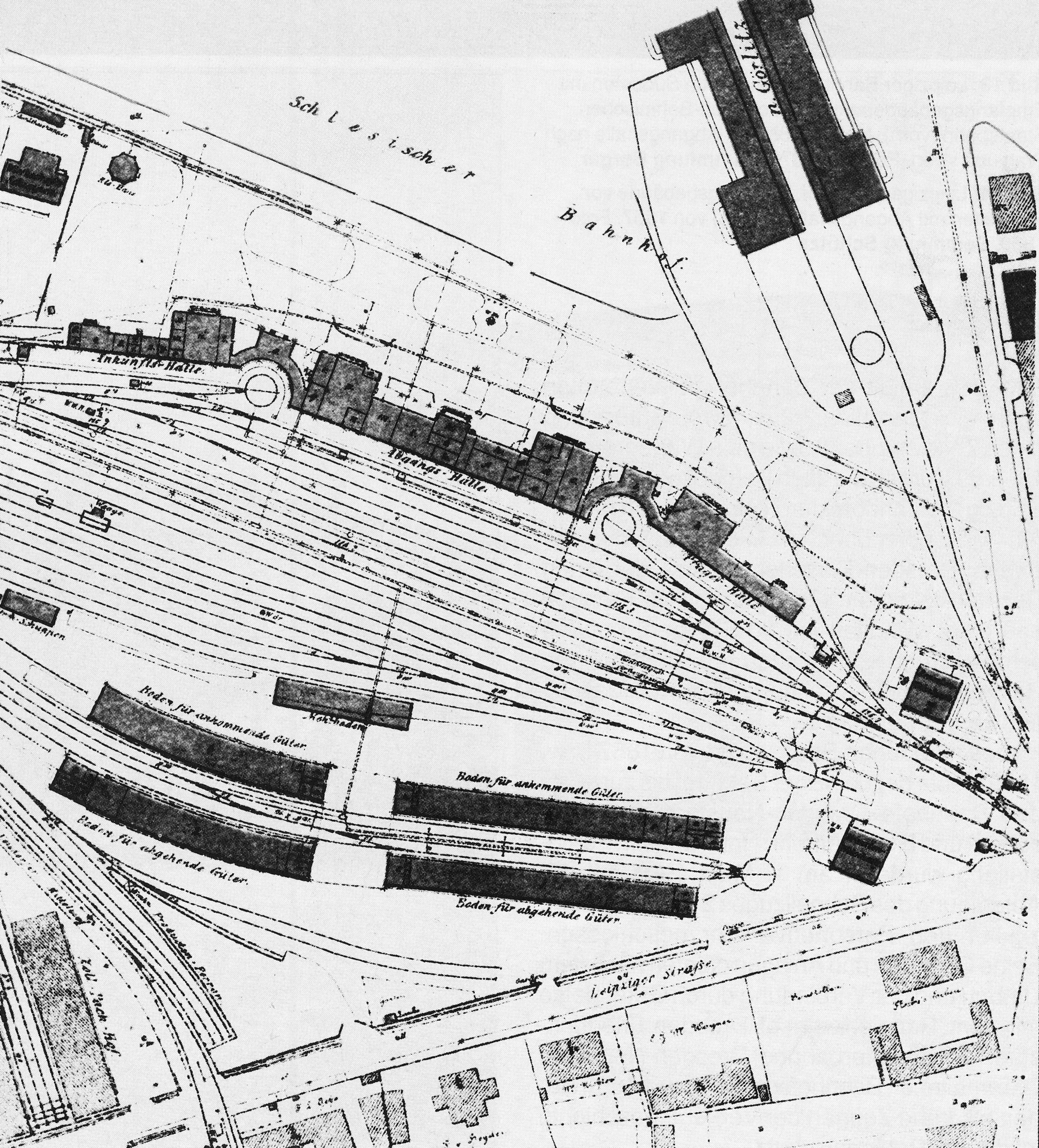
Site plan of the Leipzig station from 1877

== Bibliography ==
- Borchert, Fritz (1989). Die Leipzig-Dresdner Eisenbahn, Anfänge und Gegenwart einer 150-jährigen [The Leipzig-Dresden railway, the beginnings and present of a 150-year-old railway] (in German). Berlin: transpress VEB Verlag für Verkehrswesen. p. 109. ISBN 3-344-00354-2.
- Berger, Manfred; Weisbrod, Manfred (1991). Über 150 Jahre Dresdener Bahnhöfe [Over 150 years of Dresden railway stations]. Eisenbahn Journal Special-Ausgabe 6/91 (in German). Fürstenfeldbruck: Merker Verlag. ISBN 3-922404-27-8.
- Hoppe, Timon (2009). "Leipziger Bahnhof in Dresden – Deutschlands älteste Bahnhofsanlage" [Leipzig railway station in Dresden - Germany's oldest railway station complex]. Industrie-kultur (in German) (1). Klartext-Verlag: 42–43. ISSN 0949-3751.
- Kaiß, Kurt; Hengst, Matthias (1994). Dresdens Eisenbahn. 1894–1994 [Dresden's railway] (in German). Düsseldorf: Alba Publikation. ISBN 3-87094-350-5.
- DB Station & Service AG, Bahnhofsmanagement Dresden-Neustadt (2001). Hundert Jahre Bahnhof Dresden-Neustadt 1901–2001 [One hundred years of Dresden-Neustadt railway station 1901-2001] (in German). Dresden: HochlandVerlag Pappritz. ISBN 3-934047-10-6.
- Preuß, Erich (2001). Strüber, Oliver (ed.). Dresden Leipziger Bahnhof [Dresden Leipzig railway station]. Das große Archiv der deutschen Bahnhöfe (in German) (30. Ergänzungsausgabe ed.). Munich: GeraNova Zeitschriftenverlag. p. 4. ISSN 0949-2127.
