= German garden =

Style within garden architecture

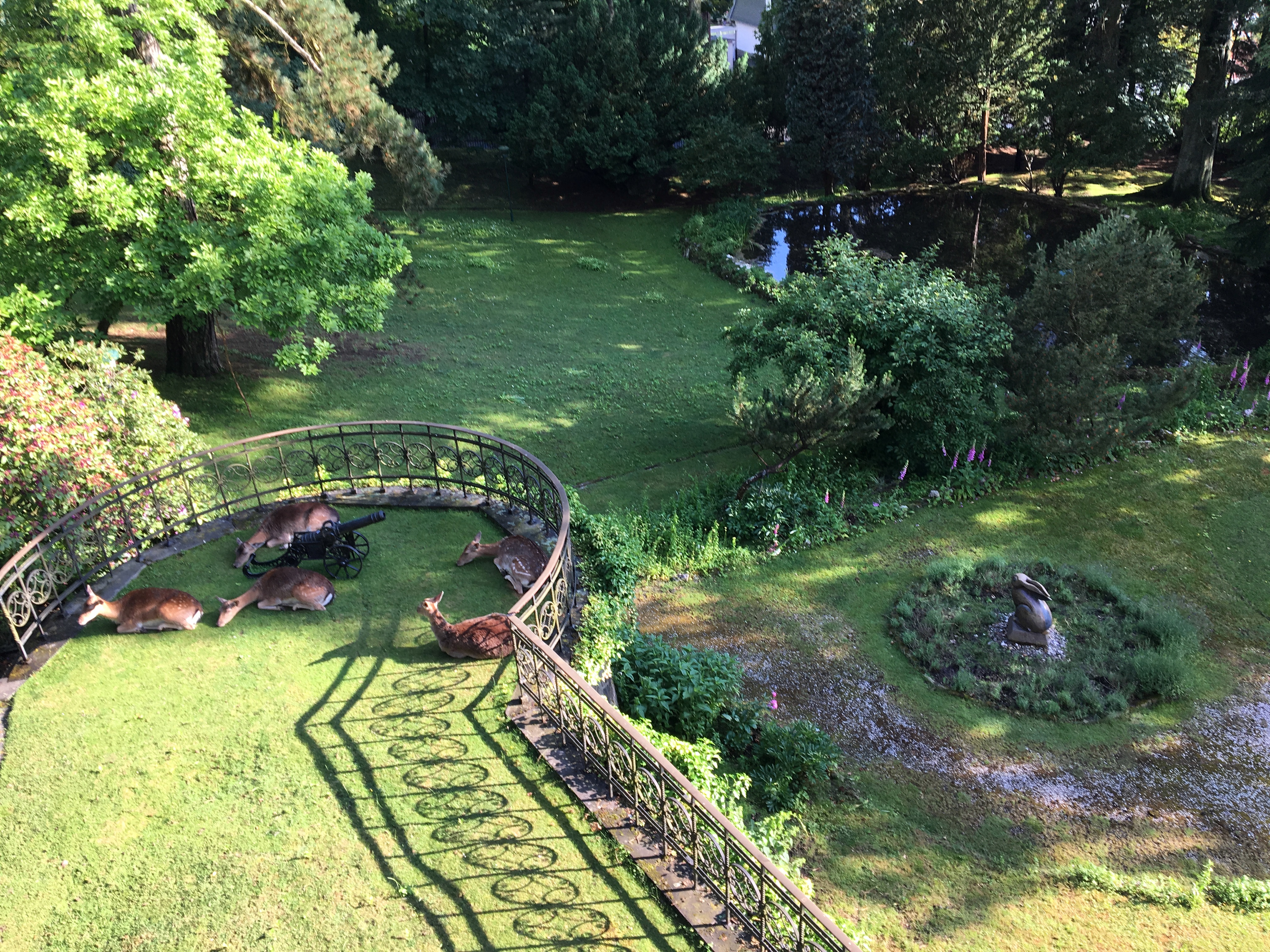
Evening idyll in the historistic park of Villa Haas – resting fallow deer around a decorative cannon on the roundel.

A German garden is a type of architecture of gardens, originating in Germany, influenced by the English garden concept. With staffages and embellishments (e.g. a grotto) and weeping trees, a sense of emotional aesthetics should be developed. Typical of this kind of park design is clear structure and domestic animals, a necessary component of the garden, as seen in former times in the Luisium Palace near Dessau in Germany or still existing the historistic park of Villa Haas (Hesse) from 1892. Livestock in the park serve to enhance the idyll (nature experience). The park area therefore had to be redesigned to protect the plants (walls, hedges, watercourses, fences).

The term "Ornamental Farm", which is still used today in manors with small park areas, forms a flowing border to this. Here, too, beauty always serves the useful. An own German garden style, as demanded by the leading German garden theorist Hirschfeld and his pupils, is never concretized in the literature compared to the French or English style. Therefore, in addition to the usual references to ancient mythology, the German style is limited to the decoration of statues, memorial stones, etc. of national importance.

If the English landscape garden mostly is the expression of a liberal bourgeoisie, the German garden is more oriented towards the model of the nobility and later incorporates elements of German Romanticism and other styles.

Often the style concept is confused with the "new German gardening". Here, more emphasis is placed on easy-care, location-loyal shrubs and colour aesthetics.

== Literature ==
- Theory of Garden Art C. C. L. Hirschfeld. Edited and translated by Linda B. Parshall ISBN 9780812235845
- Klaus F. Müller: Park und Villa Haas - Historismus Kunst und Lebensstil (Park and Villa Haas - Historism, art und lifestyle). Verlag Edition Winterwork, 2012, ISBN 978-3-86468-160-8. E-Book ISBN 978-3-86468-765-5, 2013.

== See also ==
- List of garden types
