= Friedrich Wilhelm von Erdmannsdorff =

German architect (1736–1800

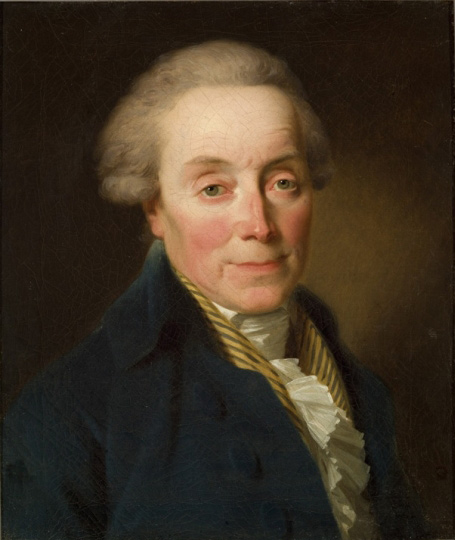
- Portrait by Johann Friedrich August Tischbein (1796)
- Born: 18 May 1736; Dresden
- Died: 9 March 1800 (aged 63); Dessau
- Occupations: architect, architectural theoretician

Friedrich Wilhelm Freiherr von Erdmannsdorff (18 May 1736 – 9 March 1800) was a German architect and architectural theoretician, and one of the most significant representatives of early German Neoclassicism during the Age of Enlightenment. His work included Wörlitz Palace in the present-day Dessau-Wörlitz Garden Realm, one of the earliest Palladian buildings on the European continent. His most well-known student was Friedrich Gilly, the teacher of Karl Friedrich Schinkel.

== Life ==
Erdmannsdorff was born in Dresden to the Saxon courtier, Baron Ernst Ferdinand von Erdmannsdorff, and his wife Henriette Margarethe, née von Heßler.

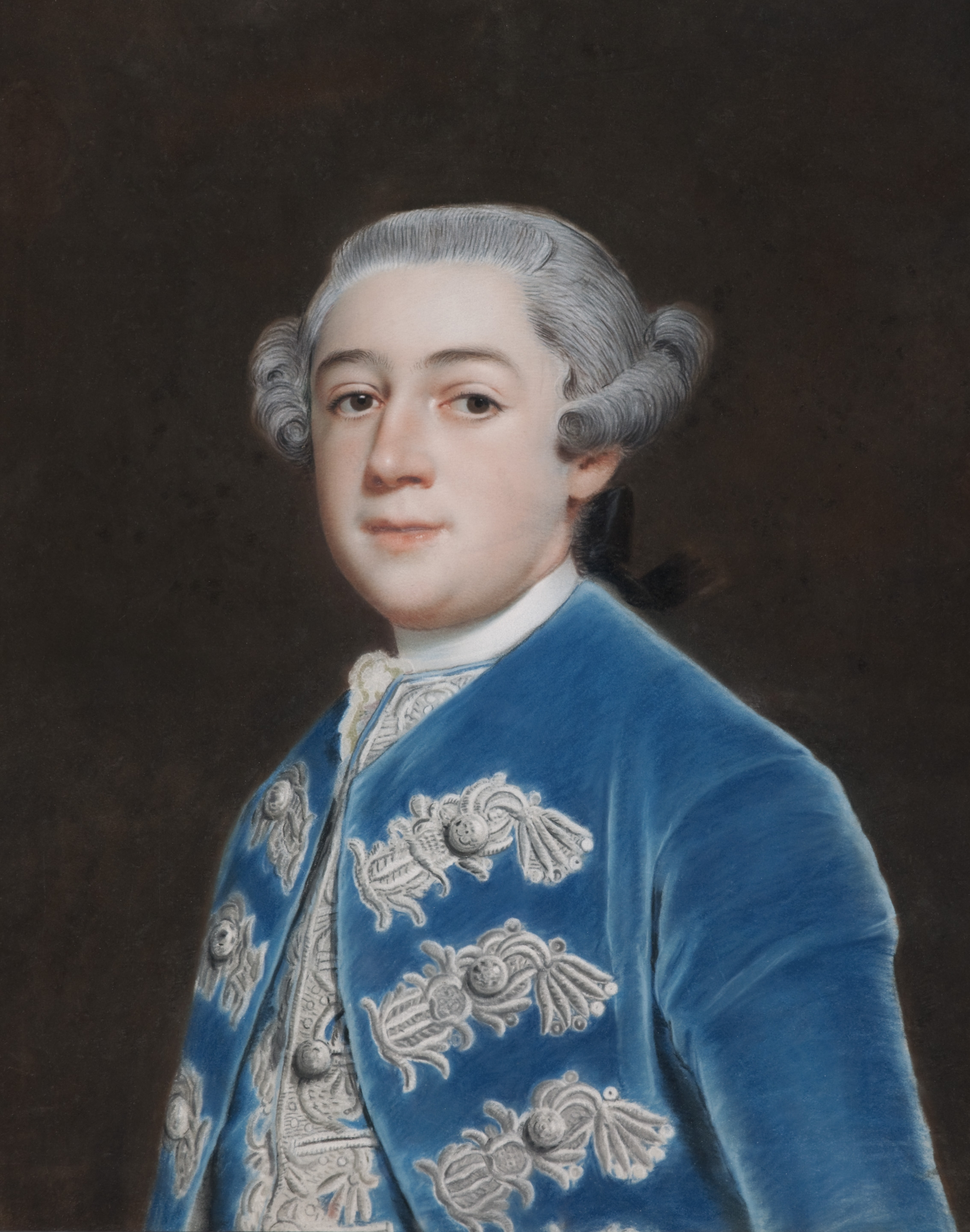
Prince Franz von Anhalt-Dessau, portrait by Christoph Friedrich Reinhold Lisiewski (1762)

After early stages of education with Jakob Mauvillon in Leipzig and at the Dresden knight academy from 1750 to 1754, Erdmannsdorff attended the University of Wittenberg in 1754–1758, where he encountered Prince Franz von Anhalt-Dessau, whose service he entered in 1758. His later fame is due his works for the prince in his Wörlitz pleasureground near the Dessau residence. At the age of twenty three Erdmannsdorff become a Freemason and was initiated at the illustrious Minerva Zu Den Drei Palmen (Minerva to the three palm trees) lodge on 23 August 1759.

In accordance with the educational ideals of the Enlightenment, the prince had the aim of reorganising his surrounding lands into a cohesive 'Garden Realm' (Gartenreich) in the style of an English landscape garden. In addition to the beautification of the landscape, cottages of various architectural styles, antique temples, bridges and memorials were to be erected and to be made accessible to everyone. Franz employed his friend and architect Erdmannsdorff to design the architectural arrangement of the grounds.

Between 1761 and 1775 on several grand tours to Italy, Holland, England, France and Switzerland, Erdmannsdorff gathered ideas for the architectural arrangement of the Wörlitz grounds. Accompanying the Prince, he got to know the style of the Scottish architects Robert and James Adam (the Adams Style). At the same time he was impressed by the architect William Chambers. In Rome Erdmannsdorff made the acquaintance of the archaeologist Johann Joachim Winckelmann and the painter Charles Louis Clérisseau, and contacted the master builder Giovanni Battista Piranesi and painter Jakob Philipp Hackert.

The contemporary art and culture of England made a particular impression on Erdmannsdorff as well as Prince Franz. The Palladian architecture in England, inspired by the Palladian Villas of the 16th century, can be seen replicated in Erdmannsdorff's later creations and was the strongest influence on his work next to the architecture and interior design of ancient Rome. In this artistic context he designed, amongst others, Wörlitz Palace, built from 1769 to 1773 for Prince Franz and his consort Louise of Brandenburg-Schwedt.

Although Erdmannsdorff favoured this particular architectural style, he also created buildings in the Neo-Gothic style preferred by Prince Franz. Among others, he converted the influences he had received on his trip to England into the building of the Gothic House in the Wörlitz Grounds.

During his time in Anhalt-Dessau, Erdmannsdorff married Wilhelmine von Ahlimb in 1781, with whom he had two daughters.

In 1786 King Frederick William II of Prussia called on his services to redecorate the bedroom and study of his predecessor, Frederick the Great, in Sanssouci Palace in Potsdam, as well a number of rooms in the Berliner Stadtschloss (Berlin City Palace). Consequently, the first consistently classical interior of the Potsdam and Berlin palaces was built to Erdmannsdorff's specifications. During his stay in Berlin and Potsdam which lasted until 1789, he became an honorary member of the 'Royal Academy of Arts and Mechanical Sciences' in Berlin. Apart from this work he was above all active as a consultant in the areas of art, culture and education in Brandenburg.

Between 1789 and 1790, Erdmannsdorff stayed again in Italy. In Rome he made the acquaintance of the painters Angelica Kauffman and Jakob Phillipp Hackert, as well as the sculptors Alexander Trippel, Antonio Canova and Bartolomeo Cavaceppi. After a trip to Weimar in 1791 with Prince Franz, he visited the courts of Gotha, Kassel and Karlsruhe. In 1796 he took over the artistic direction of the Chalkographische Gesellschaft in Dessau, founded in 1795, whose goal was to popularise artistic works through etchings. At this time he also worked as a lecturer at the Berlin School of Architecture, where he taught Friedrich Gilly among others.

Erdmannsdorff died in Dessau at the age of 64. His grave can be found at the New Graveyard (Neuer Begräbnisplatz, today known as Historical Cemetery I) in Dessau.

== Works ==
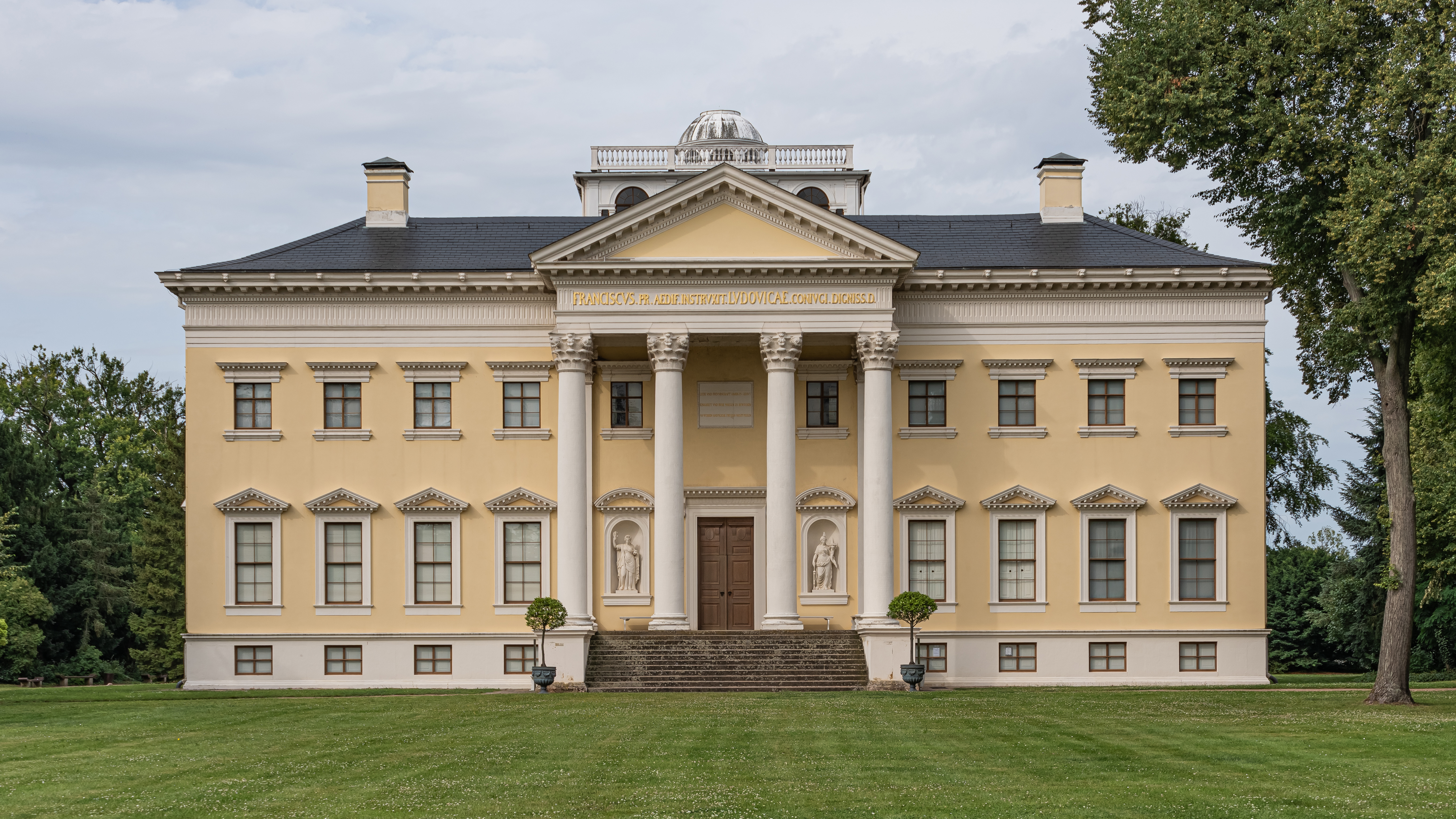
Wörlitz Palace

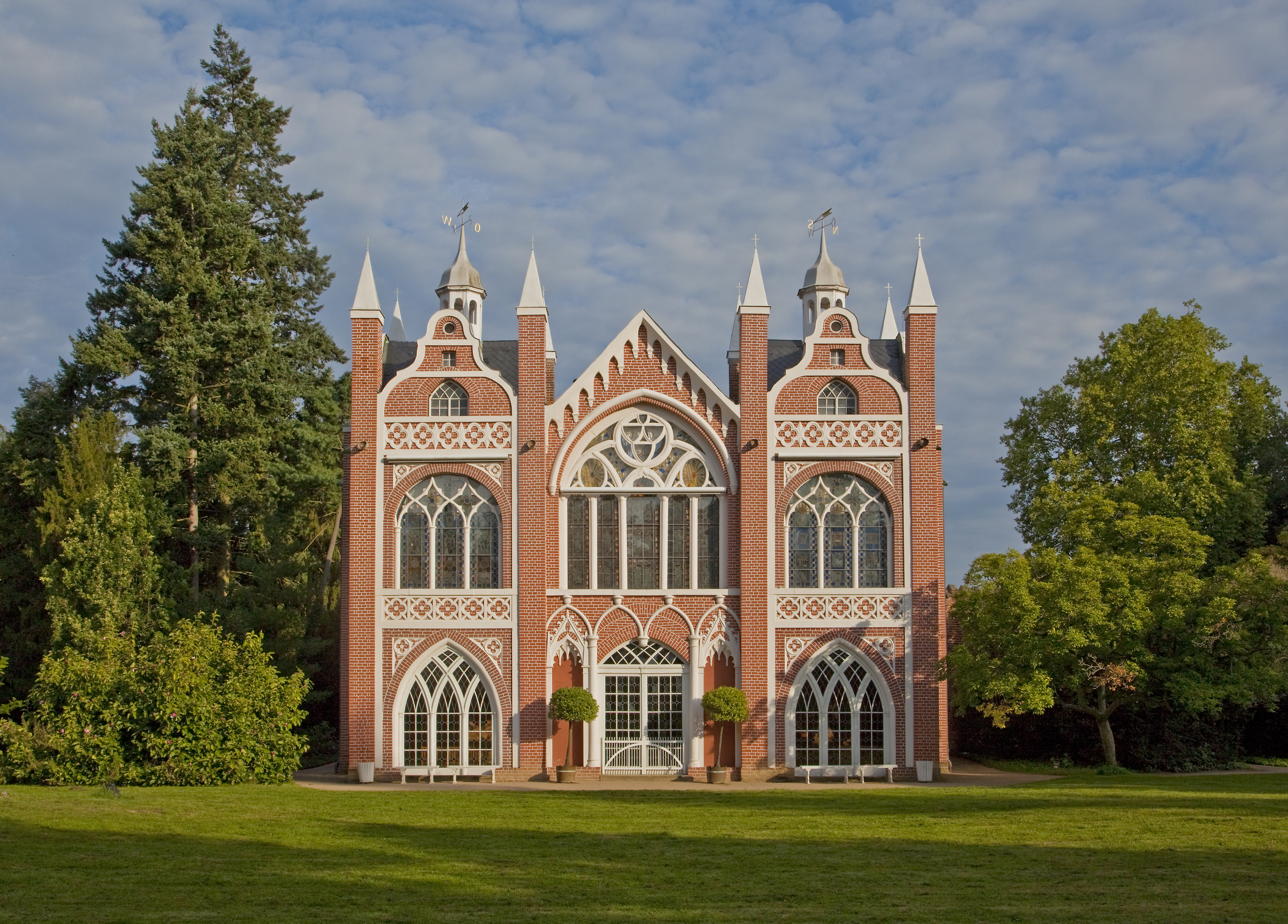
Gothic House, Wörlitz

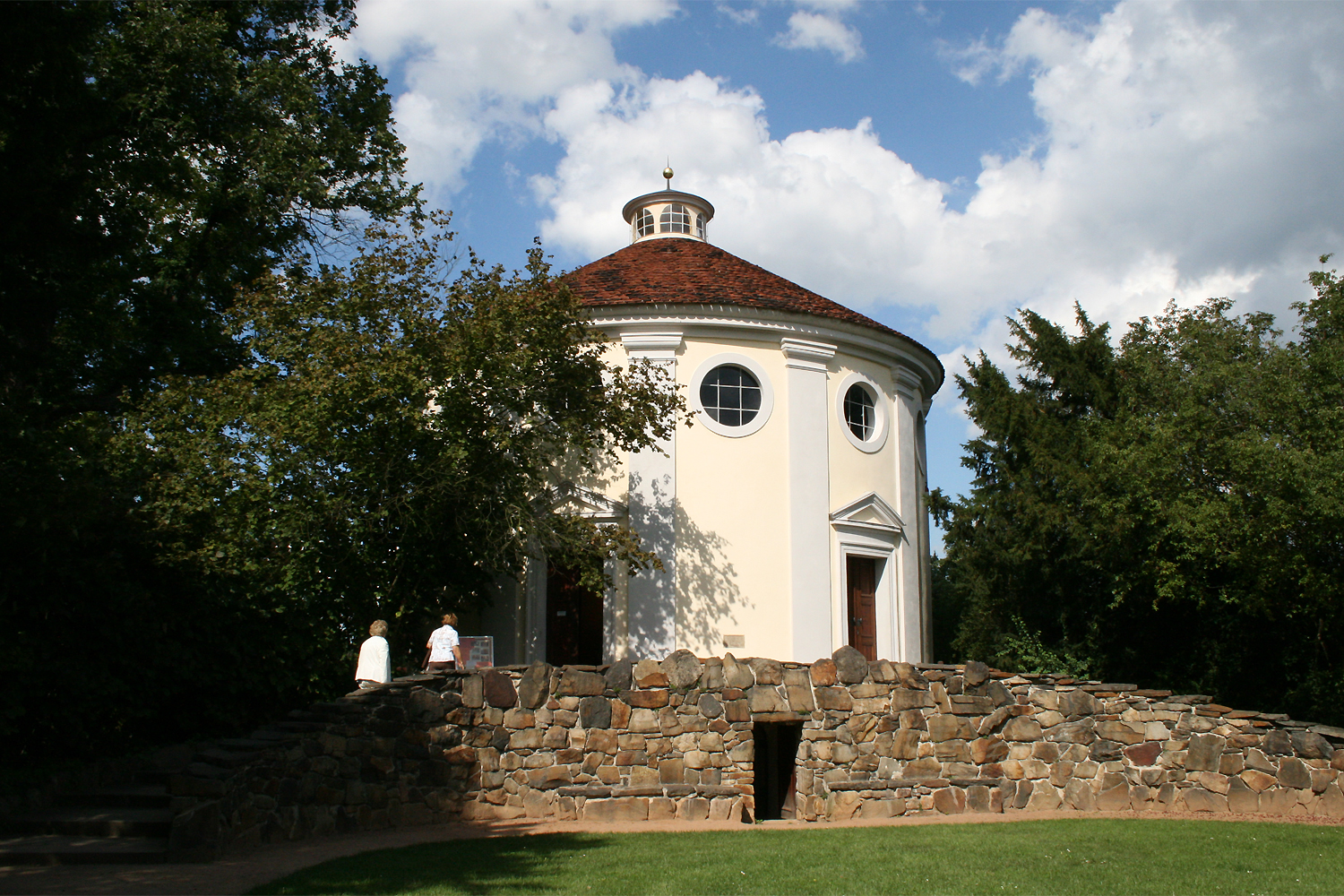
Wörlitz Synagogue

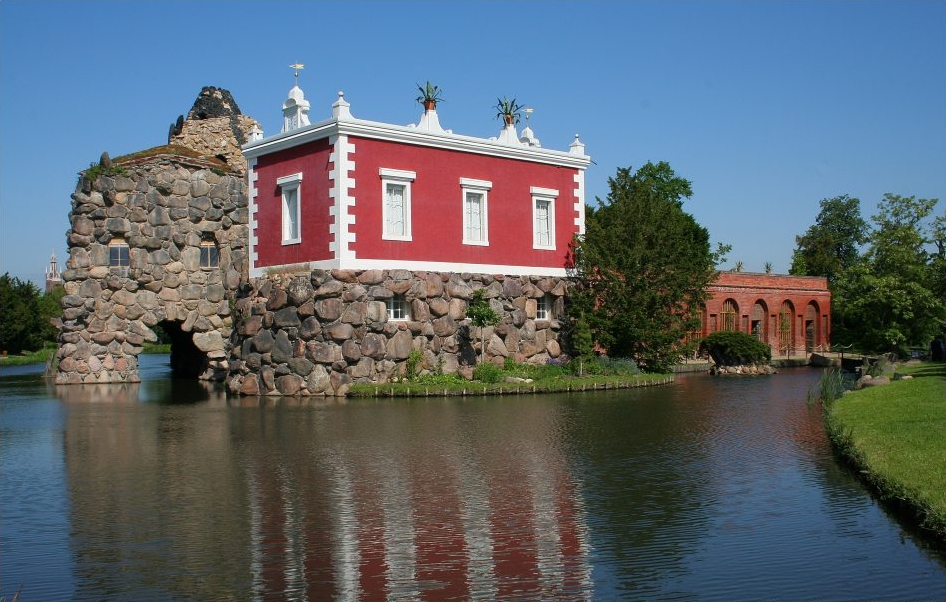
Villa Hamilton

=== Buildings in Wörlitz and the Wörlitz Grounds ===
- 1767–1768 Nymphaeum
- 1769–1773 Wörlitz Palace
- 1770–1772 Kitchen Building with Summer Hall
- 1769 Watchkeeper's house "the Horse" on the Elbe dyke
- 1772 Red Watchkeeper's house on the Elbe dyke
- 1773+1813 Gothic House
- 1785–1787 Inn "The Oak Wreath"
- 1787–1790 Wörlitz Synagogue
- 1788 Frederike's Bridge
- 1791–1794 Villa Hamilton (Rock island "Stone")
- 1792–1795 Townhall
- 1794 Temple of Venus
- 1795–1797 Pantheon
- 1796 Probstei
- 1797–1798 Temple of Flora

as well as a number of other garden follies.

=== Dessau ===
- 1767 Princess' Cabinet and Grand Ballroom in Dessau Palace
- 1774–1778 Luisium Country House
- 1780 Georgium Country House
- 1775 Pavilions in the Palace Gardens
- 1777 Palace Theatre
- nach 1780 Stranger's House and various small details in the Georgium Park
- nach 1780 House at 11/12 Poststraße
- nach 1780 House at 3 Schlossstraße
- nach 1780 52 Zerbster Straße
- 1787 New Graveyard and Graveyard Porch
- 1790–1791 Hippodrome
- 1792 Stables and Court Equerry Residence
- 1793 Orangery and Main Guards
- 1796 Houses on the Mulde Bridge
- 1798 House at 69 Zerbster Straße
- 1798 Court Theatre
- 1798 House at 10 Wallstraße

=== Potsdam ===
- 1786 Conversion of the bedroom and study of Frederick the Great in the classical style in Sanssouci Palace

=== Berlin ===
- 1787–1789 Conversion of a few rooms in the Berliner Stadtschloss (Rally Hall, Grand Column Hall, Blue French Chambers, Green French Chambers, Banquet Hall)
