= Villa Haas =

Villa in Sinn, Hesse, Germany

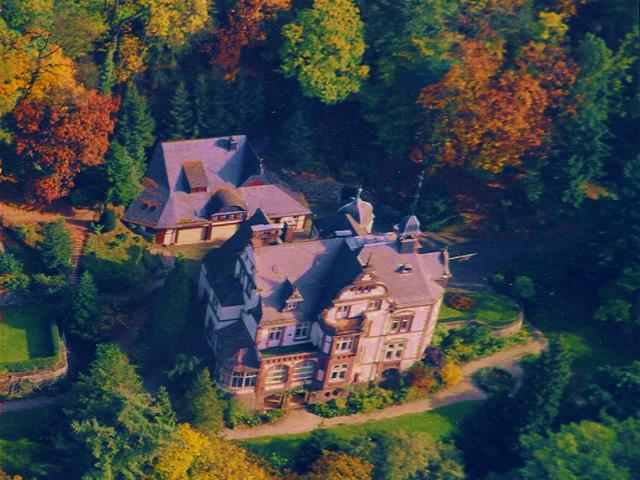
- Aerial view of Villa Haas

- Location within Germany

General information
- Type: Manor house German: Herrenhaus
- Architectural style: Renaissance Revival architecture
- Location: municipality of Sinn, Hesse, Rudolfstrasse, 35764 Sinn
- Coordinates: 50.6581°N 8.3274°E
- Construction started: 1892
- Renovated: 1930 1982 and 2021
- Client: Privy Councillor of Commerce Rudolf Haas
- Owner: Private

Height
- Height: 30 m

Technical details
- Floor count: 3

Design and construction
- Architect: Ludwig Hofmann (Architekt) 1862-1933

Villa Haas is a historical villa in the small city of Sinn, Hesse located at the western edge of the Hörre in Germany (Lahn-Dill-Kreis). The villa, the park, the surrounding streets "Hansastrasse / Rudolfstrasse" are Renaissance Revival architecture cultural monuments.

== History ==
The manor house, the outbuildings, and the garden are designed by the Herborner architect Ludwig Hofmann (1862–1933), who in 1892 was appointed by Privy Councillor of Commerce Rudolf Haas, owner of the opposite located "Neuhoffnungshütte". He was co-founder of the association of German “Eisenhüttenleute”, called today Steel Institute VDEh, and a member of the renominated Nassau Association of natural history. The “Neuhoffnungshütte” with its iron mines had from its Nassautic beginnings until the Second World War a high strategic importance; it was the economic basis for the metallic prosperity of this area. In 1978 Dr. Klaus F. Müller acquired the villa and park as a co-founder of German and European oral implantology; he used parts of the estate for practical laboratory and advanced training.

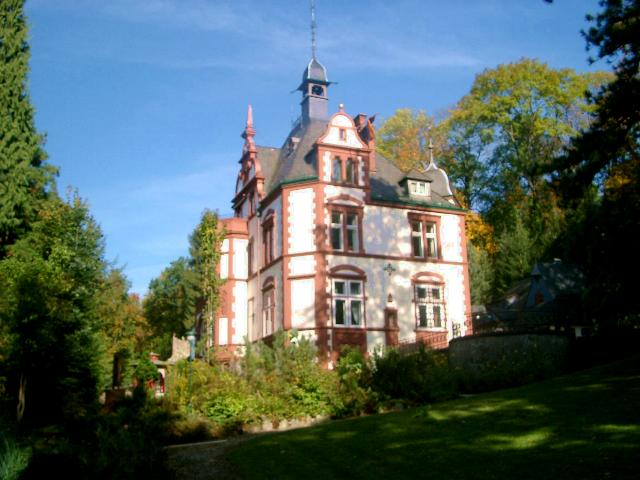

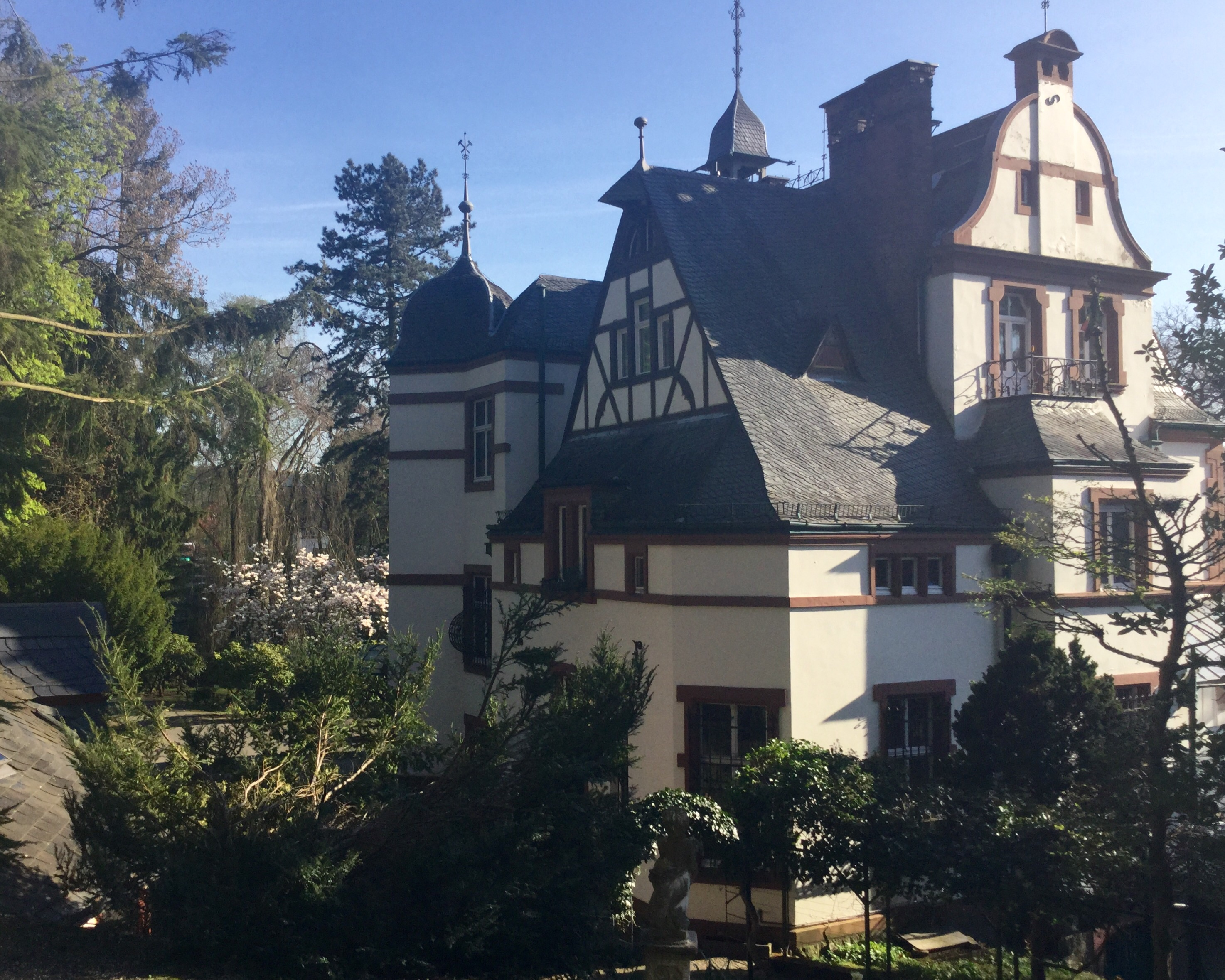

== Architecture ==
To the style elements of the two-story, high-volume estate belong rich carved stone formations above the basement level, and window and gable motifs framed with sandstone, in German Renaissance Revival architecture style. The roof and gable formations with the bell tower look very picturesque. This total impression is strengthened by the superior stairtower with roof helmet, the mining symbol, and the stained glass with motifs of Rhine romanticism from Johann Heinrich Schilbach as well as the detailed facades. The artistic interior décor consists of stucco and woodwork of different historical styles. Also worth protecting components are the small Chinese pavilion (tea house) and the wrought iron main gate.

== Technical unusual features ==
These include a dumbwaiter (elevator), electrical night storage heaters, and a lobster tank with, at this time, new air supply. The old mechanical tower clock was developed and constructed by Perrot (Calw). Later the clock gets a rare electro-mechanical addition. It combines chime works and winches with two electric motors. The mechanical circuit is steered by a mercury switch. The power transmission is made by a vee belt and is still working today.

== Garden ==
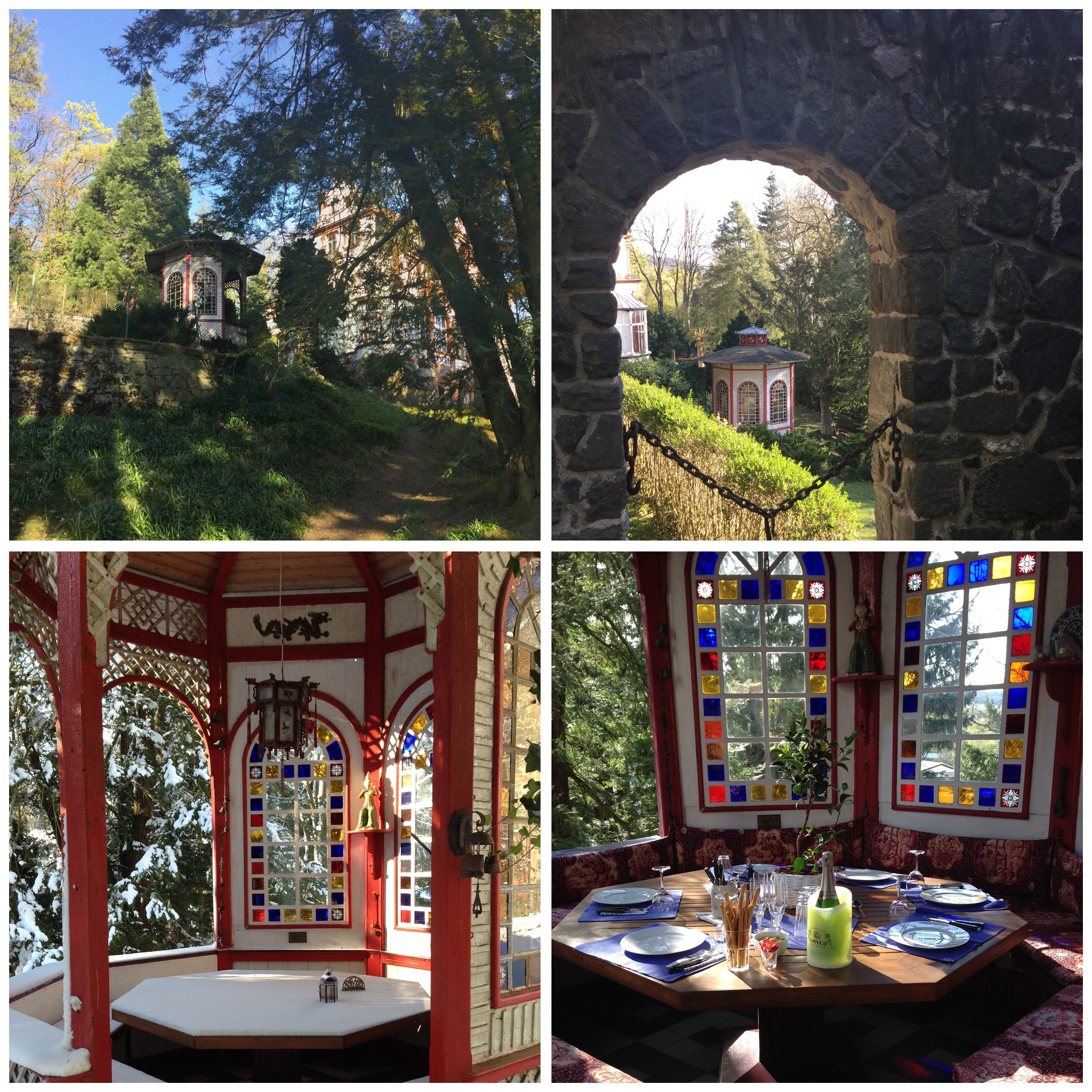
Chinese Tea House

The Grade II listed garden area contains, besides rare plants, shrubs, and trees, many stylistic elements of the historical park, like the ruin with the ice-house, the cave, the arcades, the pond, the rondell, the fountains, the cherubs, etc. The Chinese pavilion teahouse and the former pavilion which was located at the Dill (river) cliffs is going back to an idea of the German former colonial officer Retzlaff in Qingdao. The allusions to a horse path closed in the English style landscape garden are only rudimentarily available. The park is one of the few preserved recreations of historicism (art) and contains over one hundred different plant species. It is part of the territory Beilstein / Hörre, which was described by Johann Daniel Leers in his book "Flora Herbornensis" in the biodiversity with exact locations in 1775. These listings are according to Karl Löber "of unsurpassed precision and enable still today an effortless verification" (Quote translated from German).

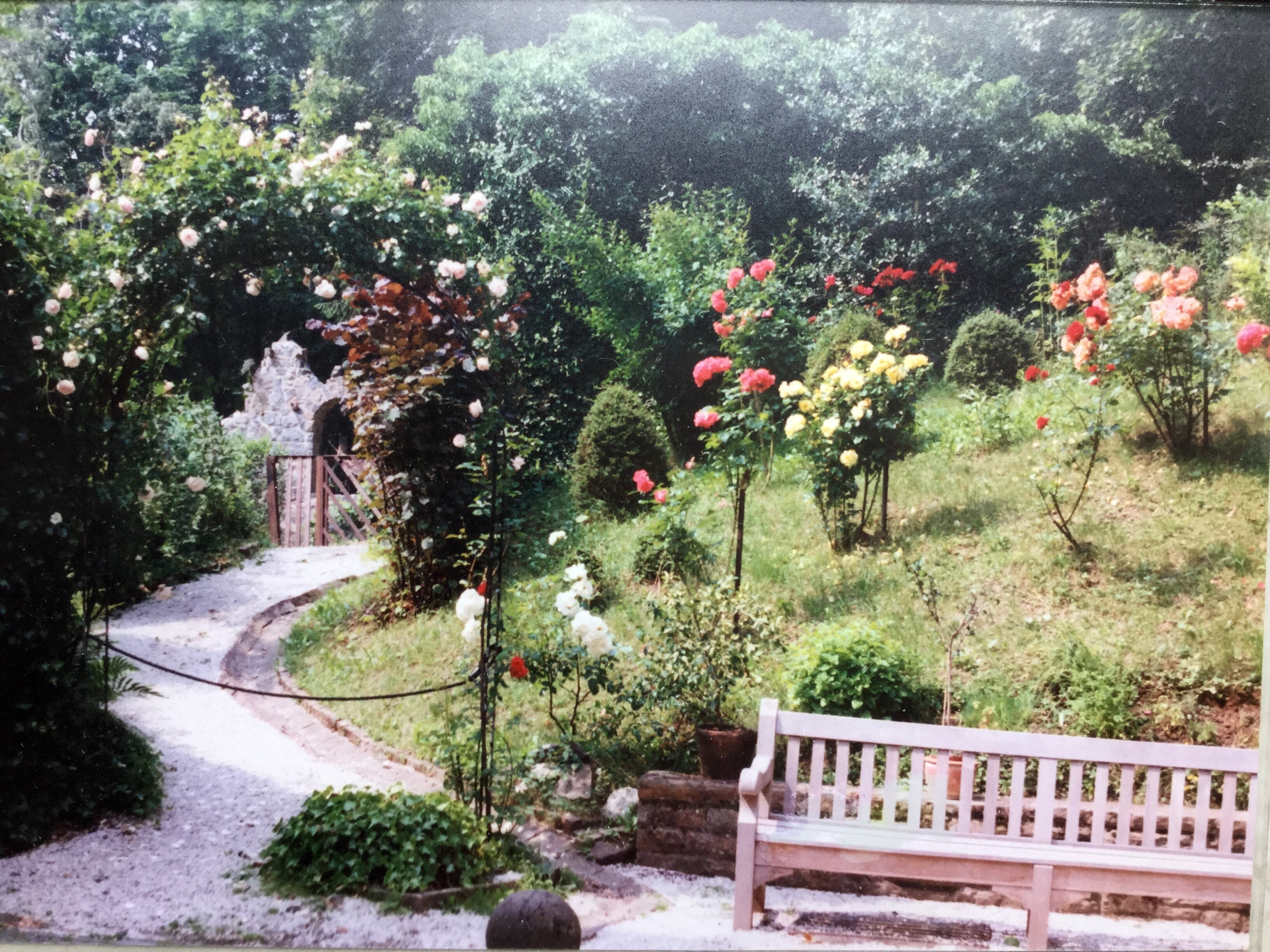
Rose plantation and Ruin

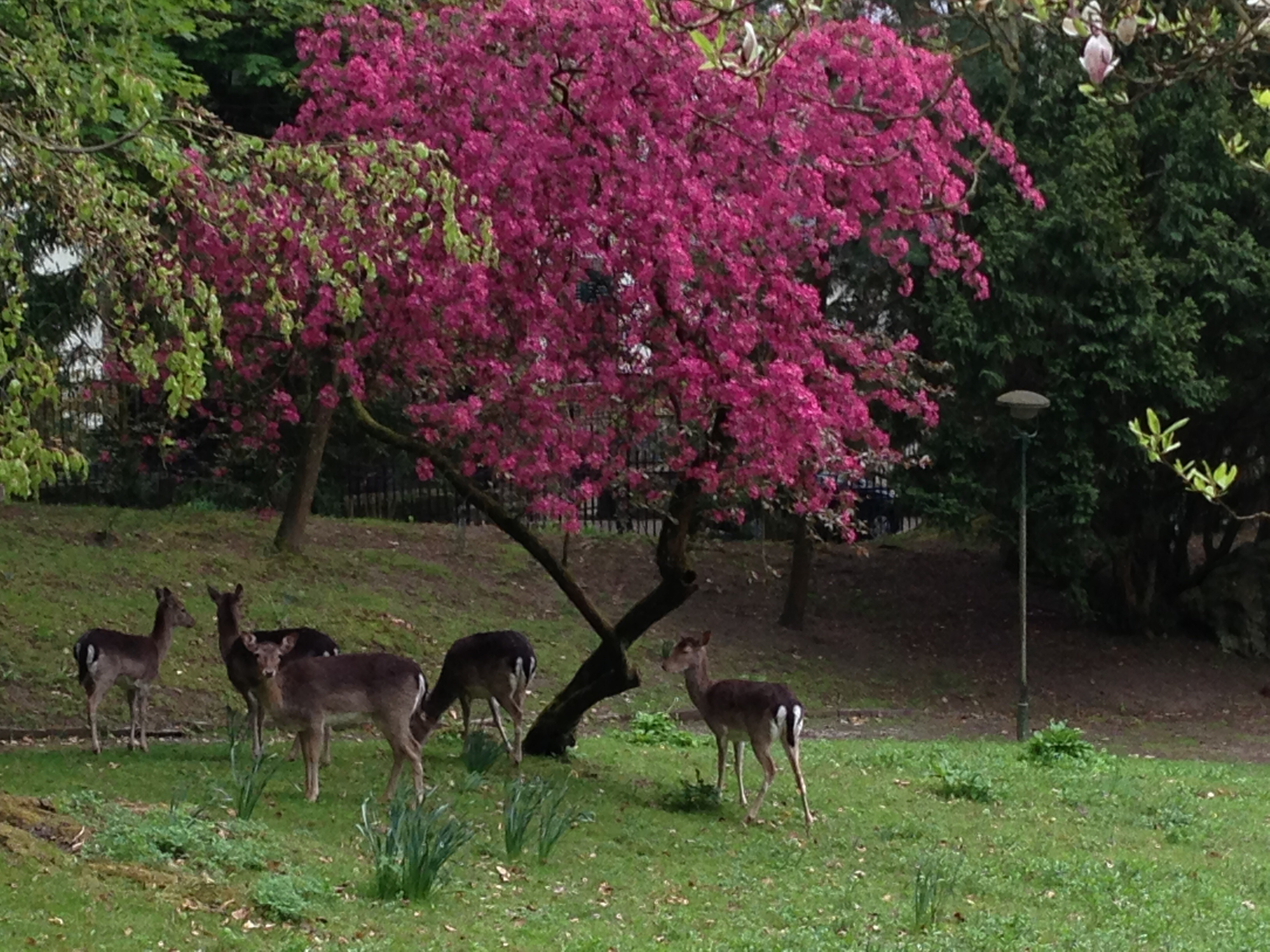
Flora and fauna

== Literature ==
- Landesamt für Denkmalpflege Hessen (Hrsg.): Lahn-Dill-Kreis I. (Denkmaltopographie Bundesrepublik Deutschland, Kulturdenkmäler in Hessen.) Friedr. Vieweg & Sohn, Braunschweig / Wiesbaden 1986, ISBN 3-528-06234-7.
- Friedhelm Gerecke: Historismus, Jugendstil, Heimatstil in Hessen und im Rheinland. Die Bauten des Architekten und Denkmalpflegers Ludwig Hofmann (1862–1933) aus Herborn. Verlag Michael Imhof, Petersberg 2010, ISBN 978-3-86568458-5.
- Otto Renkhoff: Nassauische Biographie, Seite 262, ISBN 3-922244-90-4.
- Rolf Georg, Rainer Haus, Karsten Porezag: Eisenerzbergbau in Hessen, Seite 329 und 415, ISBN 3-925619-00-3.
- Gerd Andriessen:, 100 Jahre W. Ernst Haas und Sohn, Sonderdruck Dillzeitung 26-05-1954.
- Klaus F. Müller: Park und Villa Haas - Historismus Kunst und Lebensstil. E-Book ISBN 978-3-86468-765-5, 2013
