= Luisium =

Coordinates: 51°51′2.5″N 12°16′19.5″E

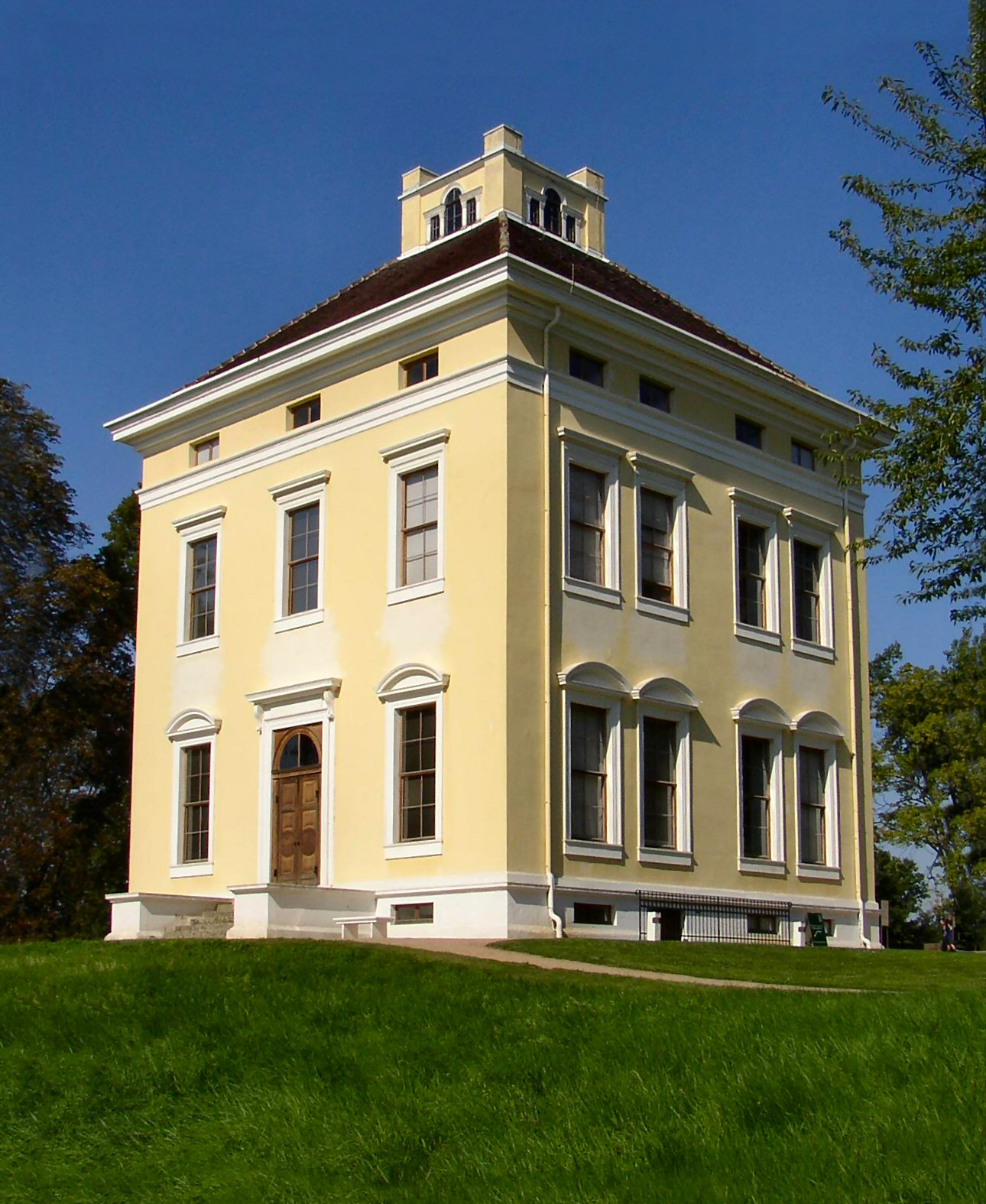
Schloss Luisium

Luisium is a palace and landscape garden in Dessau-Roßlau, Germany. It is a part of Dessau-Wörlitz Garden Realm, a UNESCO World Heritage Site. In 1774 work started on a small palace in the style of an English country house, which Leopold III, Duke of Anhalt-Dessau built for his wife Margravine Louise of Brandenburg-Schwedt, thus the name Luisium.

== Garden dreams ==
Luisium Villa and Park are part of the Saxony-Anhalt Garden Dreams project.
