= Siebenlehn =

- Town
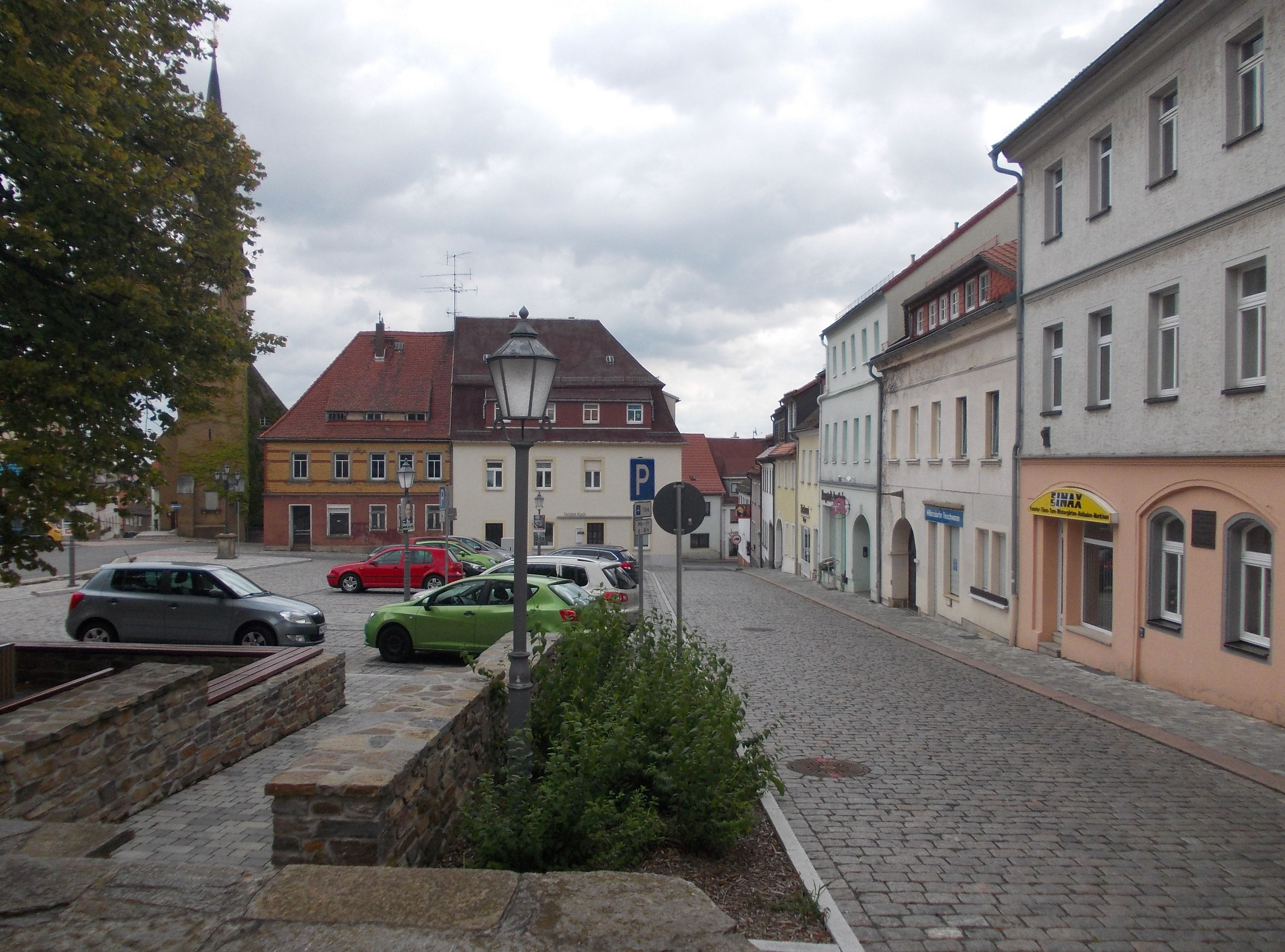
- Market square

- Coat of arms

- Siebenlehn in Saxony
- Coordinates: 51°1′55″N 13°18′30″E
- Country: Germany
- Federal state: Saxony
- District: Mittelsachsen
- Municipality: Großschirma
- founded: 12th century

Area
  - Total: 1,597 ha (3,950 acres)
- Elevation: 325 m (1,066 ft)

Population (2012)
  - Total: 1,496
  - Density: 93.68/km^{2} (242.6/sq mi)
- Time zone: UTC1 (CET)
  - Summer (DST): UTC2 (CEST)
- Post code: 09603
- Area code: 035242

Siebenlehn is a district of the town Großschirma in Landkreis Mittelsachsen. Until 2003 it was a separate town. Upon fusion with the neighbouring rural municipality Großschirma on 1 September 2003, the town privileges were transferred to the joint municipality.

== Geography ==
Siebenlehn is located about 3 km (1.9 mi) south of Nossen, on the eastern edge of Zellwald forest and west of Freiberger Mulde river. West of the town runs Bundesstraße 101 between Freiberg and Meißen, north of it the motorway A4. The junction of both is situated about 1 km (0.62 mi) north-west of the town centre.

== History ==
The original Waldhufendorf was founded in the middle of the 12th century during the eastward expansion of the Holy Roman Empire. Soon after, linked to mining activities which have been mentioned in records since 1346, a planned town arose. In 1370 it was awarded town and market privileges. The name of the town means "seven land grants".

In 1388 Sybenlehn was mentioned as Städtchen (small town) and market, in 1449 it was listed in records of the Freiberg district office as a Stetelin in Erzgebirgischer Kreis (ore Mountains district). Since 1439, Siebenlehn has had its own church parish. Until then, it was a filial church of Nossen. In 1552, Altzella Abbey had the manorial rights over Siebeln, as the town was then called. At this time it had 74 besessene Mann, 1 Häusler und 85 Inwohner. In 1723 Siebenlehn is recorded as a town subject to Amt Nossen, which it remained until 1816. It then passed to Amt Freiberg, back to Amt Nossen, and from 1875 it formed part of Amtshauptmannschaft Meißen. In 1913, the neighbouring village of Breitenbach was incorporated.

After World War II about 500 German deportees and refugees came to Siebenlehn, increasing the number of inhabitants temporarily to 2860. In the course of the administrative reforms of 1952 the town came to Kreis Freiberg in Bezirk Karl-Marx-Stadt.

Following the political changes 1989/1990 the number of inhabitants fell to about 1900. In 1994 the village of Obergruna joined Siebenlehn. In 1998 Siebenlehn entered an administrative cooperation with Reinsberg, Germany which was dissolved in 2003. Financial difficulties related to overspending on the establishment of a business park caused the heavily indebted town Siebenlehn to join the municipality of Großschirma. This was the first time in Saxony that a town joined a rural municipality. The town privileges were transferred to the merged municipality.

=== Number of inhabitants over time ===
Starting in 1998, numbers are given as of 31 December.

- 1834 – 1.422
- 1871 – 1.925
- 1890 – 2.231
- 1910 – 1.993
- 1925 – 2.305
- 1939 – 2.368
- 1946 – 2.860
- 1950 – 2.852
- 1964 – 2.499
- 1990 – 1.983
- 1998 – 2.313
- 1999 – 2.287
- 2000 – 2.273
- 2001 – 2.185
- 2002 – 2.142
- 2003 – 2.129 (30 September)

== Sights and attractions ==
The principal sights of the town include the market square, the church which was built in 1774/1775 with its 46 m (151 ft) tall tower, the motorway bridge which – with a height of 70 m (230 ft) above the mean level of Freiberger Mulde river – once was the highest of its kind in Europe, and the water tower.

== Economy ==
In the Middle Ages the bakers of wheat bread and the butchers of Siebenlehn gained a good reputation outside the town limits. Siebenlehn bakers are credited in early modern sources with the invention of Stollen, a famous Christmas specialty that was mentioned as a present to the Amtmann of Nossen. During the Thirty Years' War they supplied the town of Meißen which was besieged by Swedish troops. That way, the recipe of Stollen reached Dresden and became known all over the world.

Beginning around 1600, wax was processed, mostly as a side job. Leftover wax and spent honeycombs were processed into yellow wax. Siebenlehn was an important centre of the wax trade in Saxony.

From the 18th century on, the export-oriented shoemaking became increasingly important.

== Infrastructure ==
Siebenlehn is located directly on the motorway A4, the junction with Bundesstraße 101 is located north-west of the town. Dresden und Chemnitz can be reached within 20 min. By means of a junction with motorway A14 the city of Leipzig can be reached in about 45 min. The town is traversed by Bundesstraße 101 and Staatsstraße 195.

From 1899 to 1972 Siebenlehn had a station on the narrow-gauge railway line Freital-Potschappel – Wilsdruff – Nossen.

== Personalities ==
- Otto Altenkirch (1875–1945), painter
- Charitas Bischoff, (1848–1925), author, daughter of Amalie Dietrich
- Amalie Dietrich (1821–1891), née Nelle, botanist and zoologist specialising in the flora and fauna of Australia
- Johann Gottlob Mende (1787–1850), organ builder
- Friedrich Oswald Naupert (1841–1926), entrepreneur, communal politician, and honorary citizen of Roßwein
- Friedrich Wilhelm Putzger (1849–1913), educator and author of school books

== Gallery ==
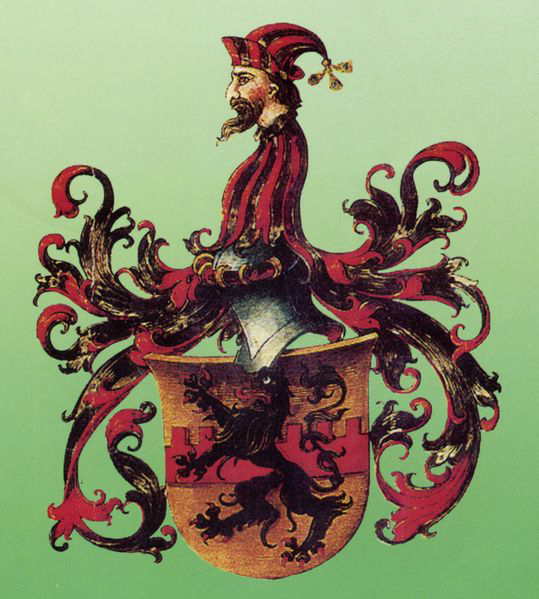
Coat of arms of Siebenlehn

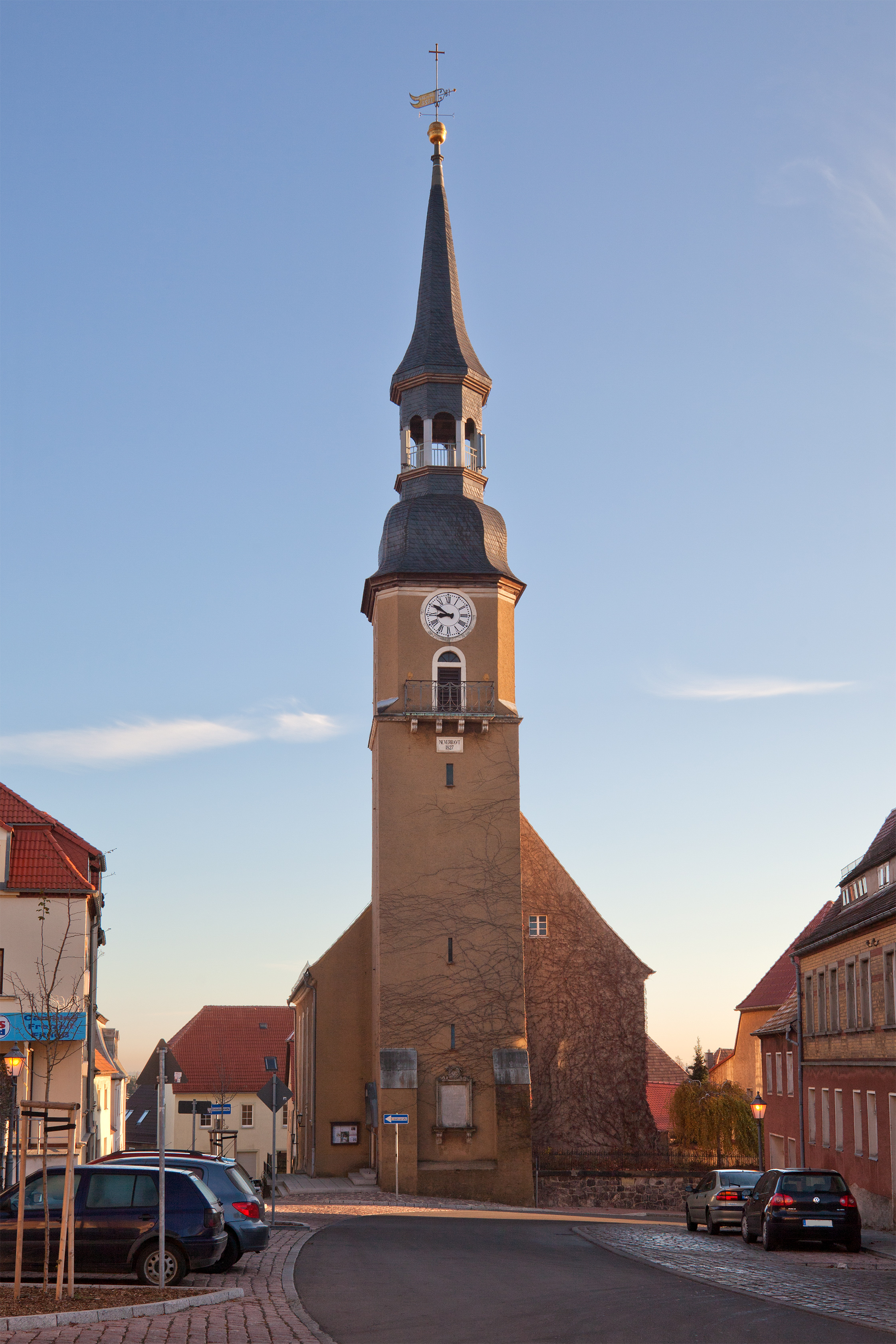
Church in Siebenlehn

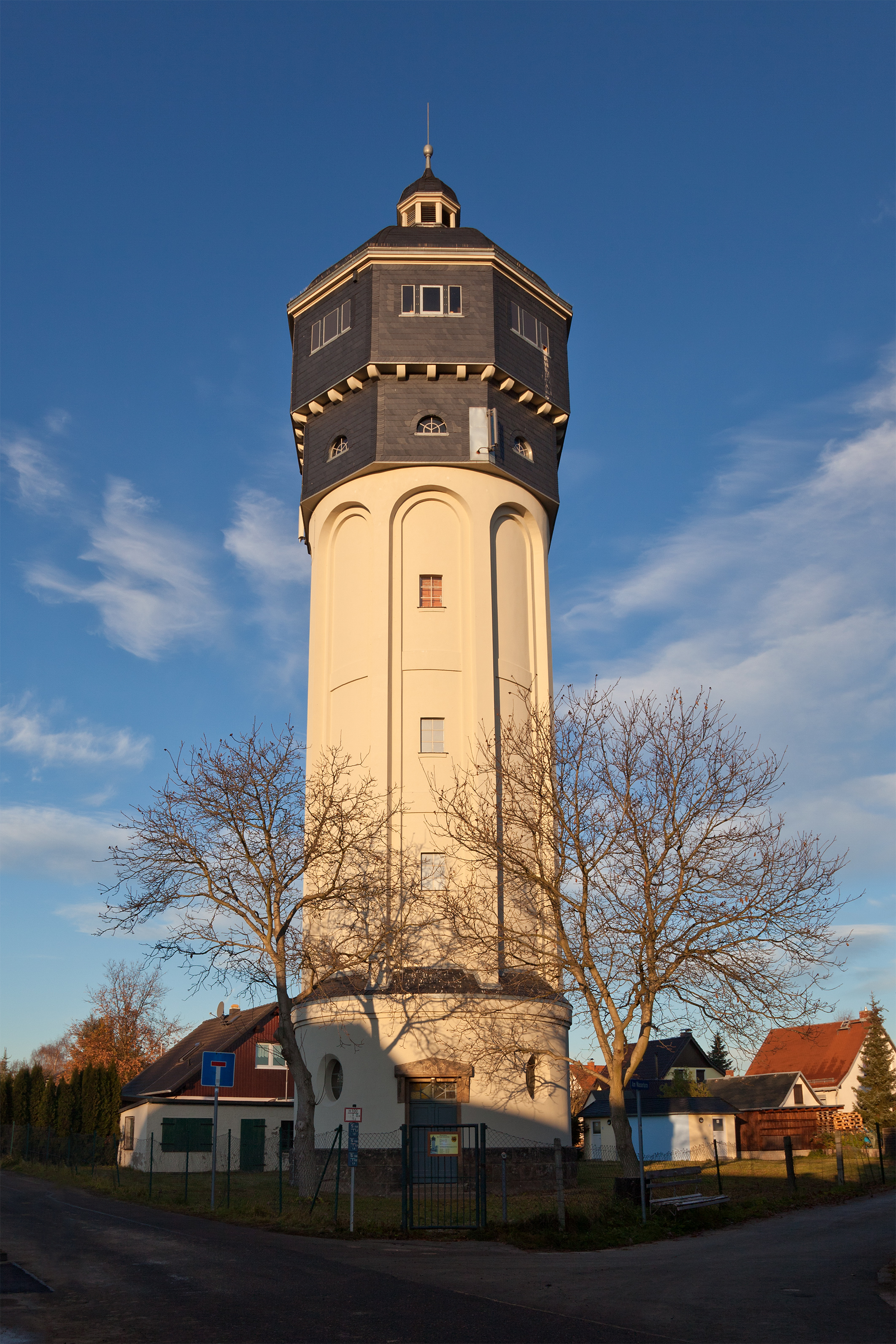
Water tower

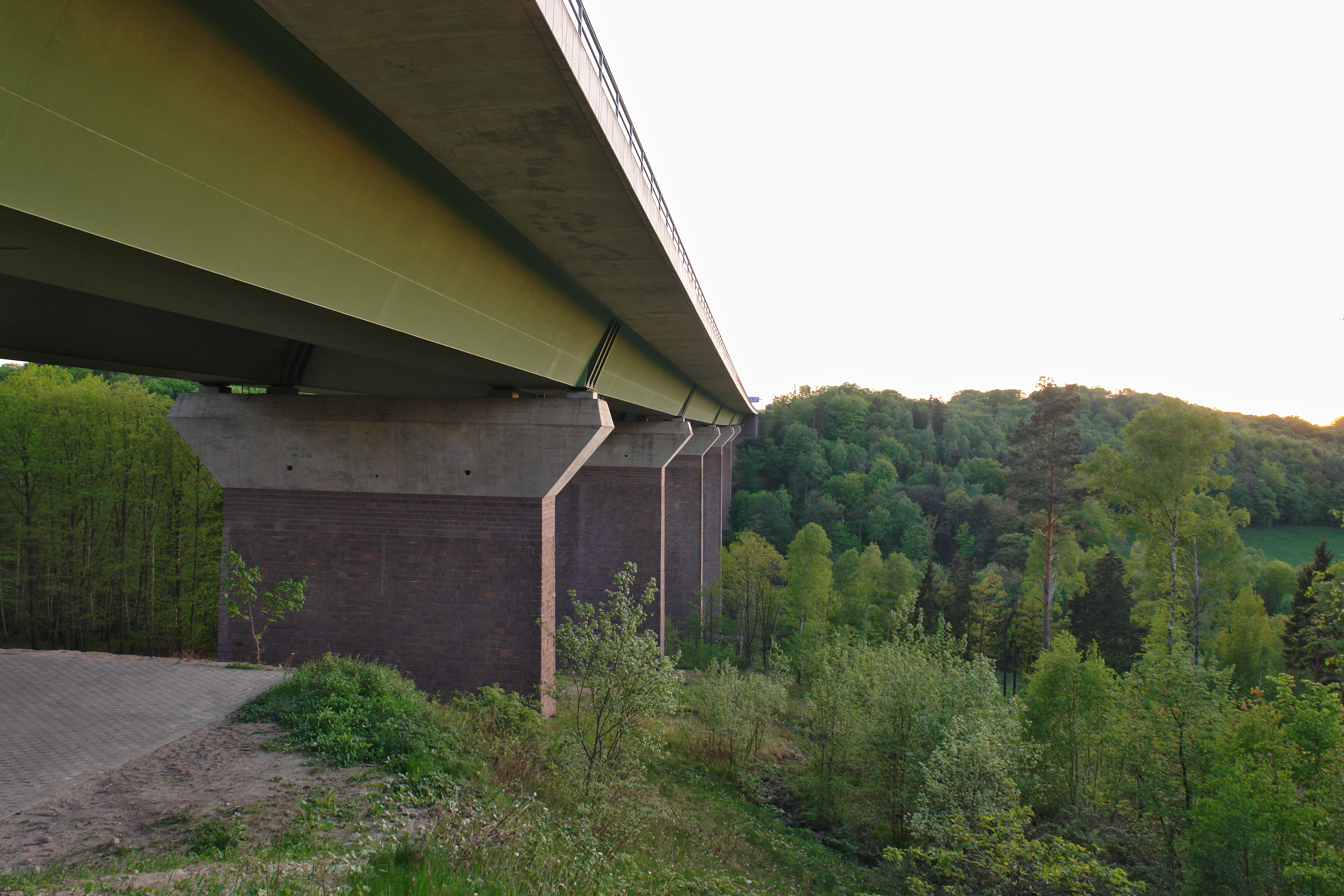
Motorway bridge Siebenlehn

== Bibliography ==
- Schumann, August (1824). "Siebenlehn". Vollständiges Staats-, Post- und Zeitungslexikon von Sachsen (in German). Vol. 11. Zwickau. p. 136.
- Cornelius Gurlitt: Siebenlehn. In: Beschreibende Darstellung der älteren Bau- und Kunstdenkmäler des Königreichs Sachsen, 41. Volume: Amtshauptmannschaft Meißen-Land. C. C. Meinhold, Dresden 1923, p. 481.
