= Bobritzsch =

Bobritzsch may refer to:

- Bobritzsch (municipality), former municipality in Saxony, Germany
  - Bobritzsch-Hilbersdorf, merger of the municipalities Bobritzsch and Hilbersdorf in 2012
- Bobritzsch (river), a river of Saxony, Germany
