= Colmnitzbach =

River in Germany

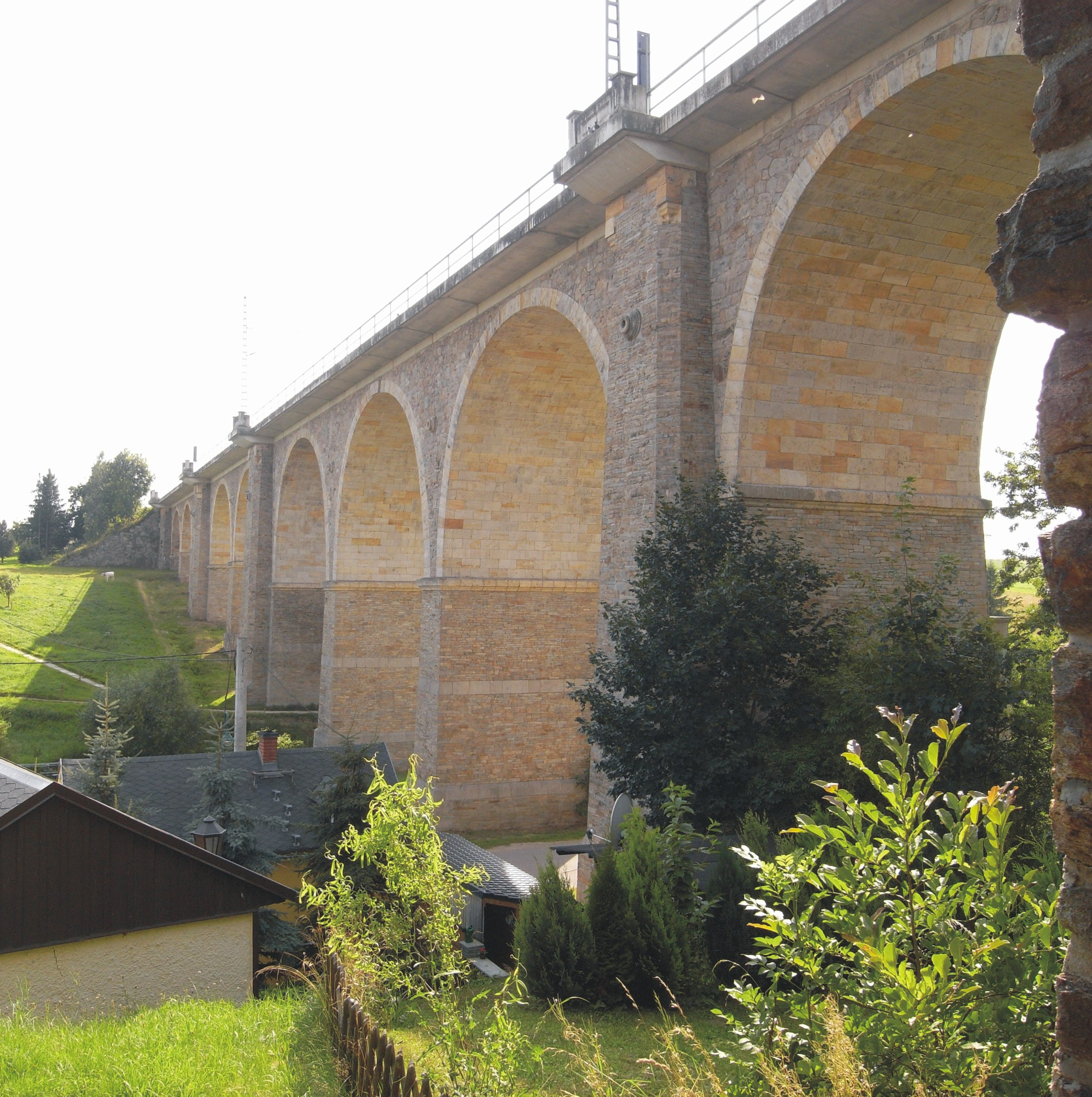

Location
- Country: Germany
- State: Saxony

Physical characteristics
- Mouth
  - location: Bobritzsch
  - coordinates: 50.9325°N 13.4367°E

Basin features
- Progression: Bobritzsch→ Freiberger Mulde→ Mulde→ Elbe→ North Sea

The Colmnitzbach is a river of Saxony, Germany. It is a right tributary of the Bobritzsch, which it joins in Naundorf (a district of Bobritzsch).

== See also ==
- List of rivers of Saxony
