= Bobritzsch (river) =

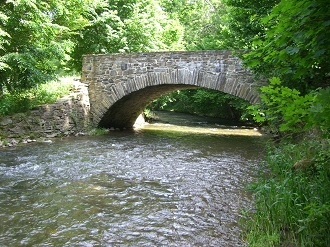
- Salzbrücke across Bobritzsch between Falkenberg and Krummenhennersdorf

Location
- Country: Germany
- State: Saxony

Physical characteristics
- Source
  - location: near Reichenau
  - coordinates: 50°46′56.4″N 13°35′59″E
  - elevation: 674 m (NHN)
- Mouth
  - location: near Reinsberg
  - coordinates: 51°1′14″N 13°20′22″E
  - elevation: 235 m (NHN)
- Length: 38 km (24 mi)
- Basin size: 131 km^{2} (51 sq mi)
- Discharge
  - location: Krummenhennersdorf
  - average: 1.53 m^{3}/s (54 cu ft/s)
  - minimum: 66 L/s (16.08.2000)
  - maximum: 160 m^{3}/s (5,700 cu ft/s) (13.08.2002)

Basin features
- Progression: Freiberger Mulde→ Mulde→ Elbe→ North Sea

The Bobritzsch is a river of Saxony, Germany. It is a right tributary of the Freiberger Mulde with a length of about 38 km (24 mi). Its Gewässerkennzahl is 5422.

== Course ==
The source of the river is located about 5 km (3.1 mi) south-east of Frauenstein in the Eastern Ore Mountains, above Hartmannsdorf-Reichenau on the edge of Kreuzwald forest and 600 m (2,000 ft) from Weicheltmühle (a watermill) on Gimmlitz river.

The river passes through Reichenau, Kleinbobritzsch, Hartmannsdorf, Friedersdorf, Oberbobritzsch and Niederbobritzsch, Naundorf, Falkenberg, Krummenhennersdorf, Reinsberg and Bieberstein.

A well-known hiking path along Bobritzsch river between Krummenhennersdorf and Reinsberg is called Grabentour. Reinsberg Castle is located on a rock above the right bank of the river, Bieberstein Castle above its left bank.

Bobritzsch river joins Freiberger Mulde between Reinsberg and Siebenlehn, 1 km (0.62 mi) north of Bieberstein castle.

== Origin of the name ==
The name of the river originates from Old Sorbian Bobrica, derived from bobr (beaver), and signifies a water course where beavers lived.

== Gallery ==
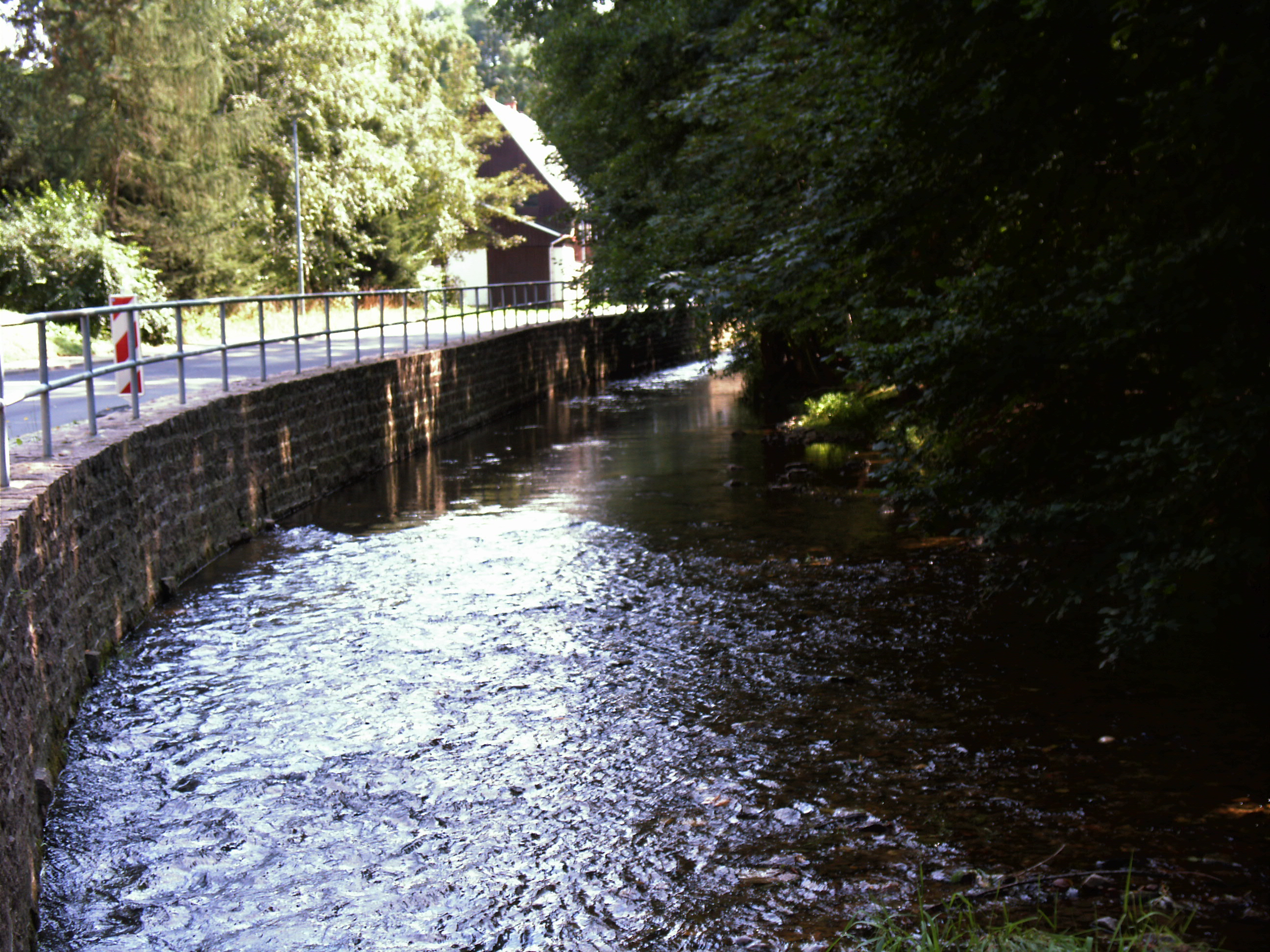
Between Oberbobritzsch and Niederbobritzsch

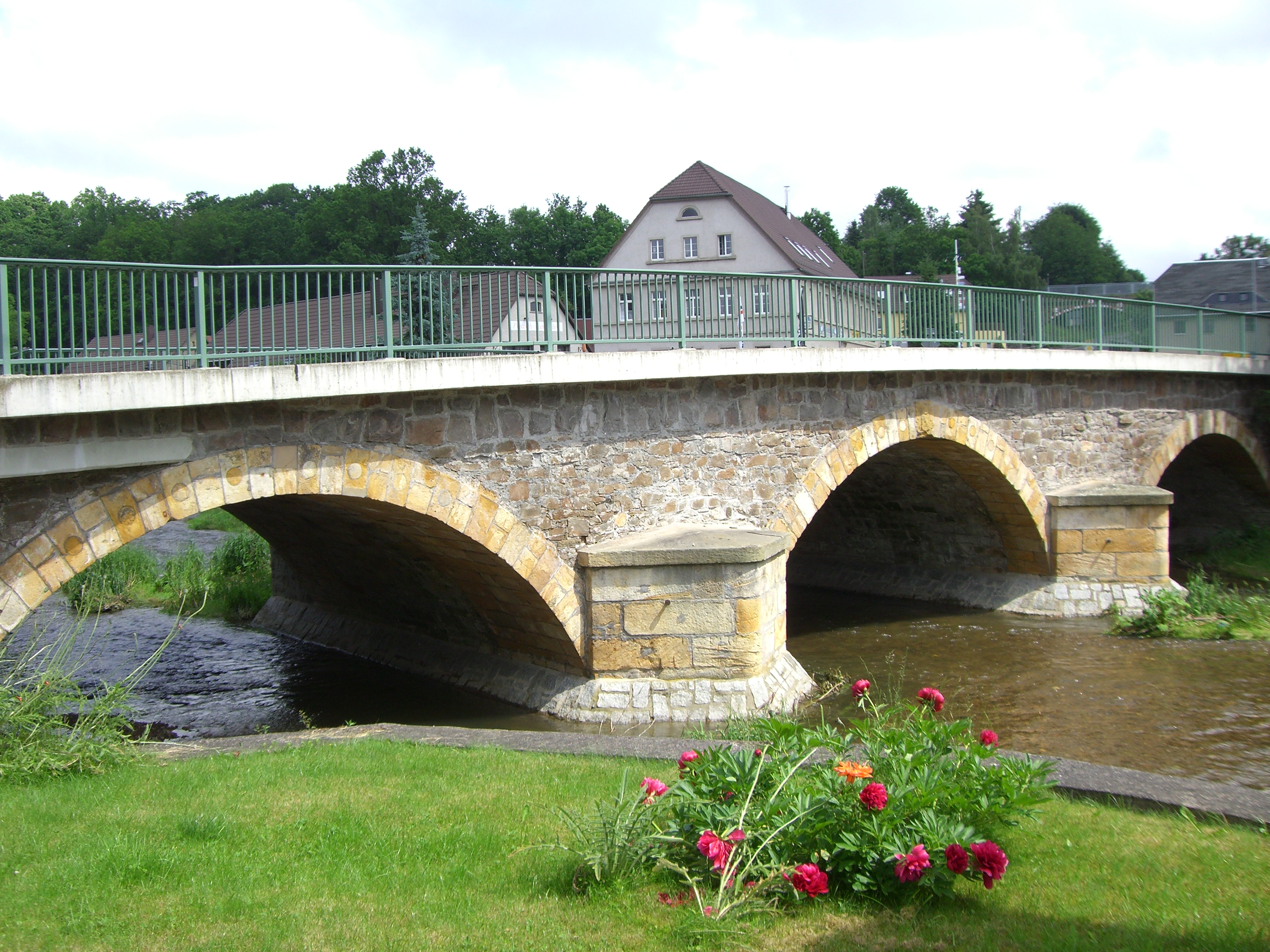
Bridge of Bundesstraße 173 in Naundorf

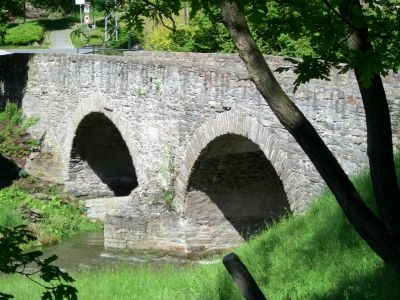
Arch bridge in Falkenberg, built in 1567

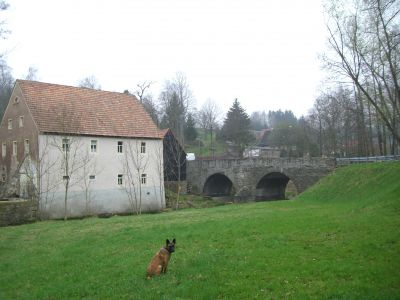
Former Erblehnmühle near the arch bridge

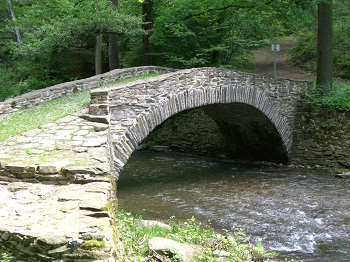
Schafbrücke ("sheep's bridge") near Oberschaar

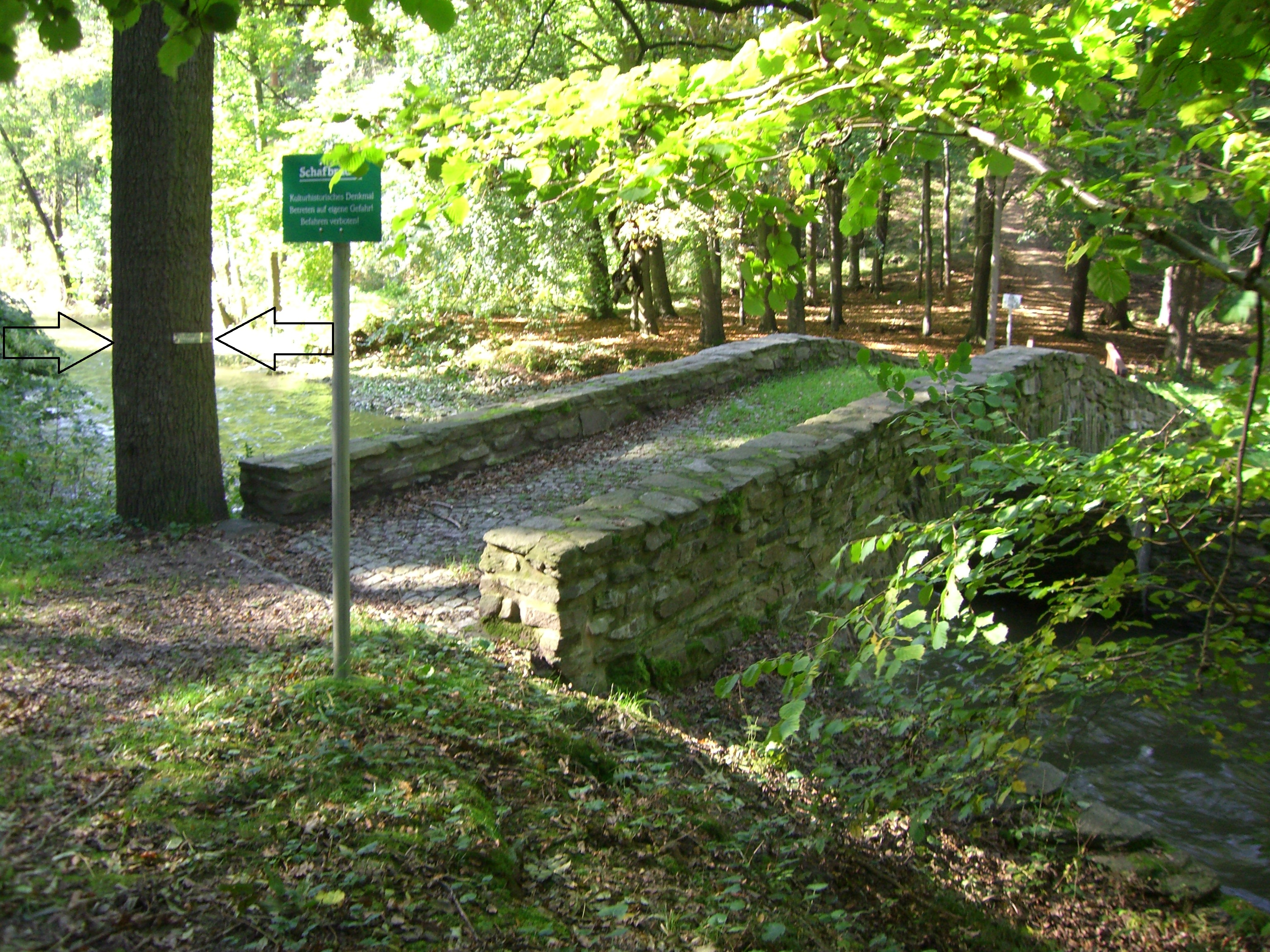
Flood level of August 2002 near Schafbrücke

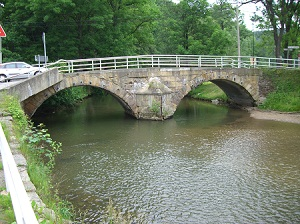
Bridge in Krummenhennersdorf, built in 1806

== See also ==
- List of rivers of Saxony
