= Otto Altenkirch =

German painter (1875–1945)

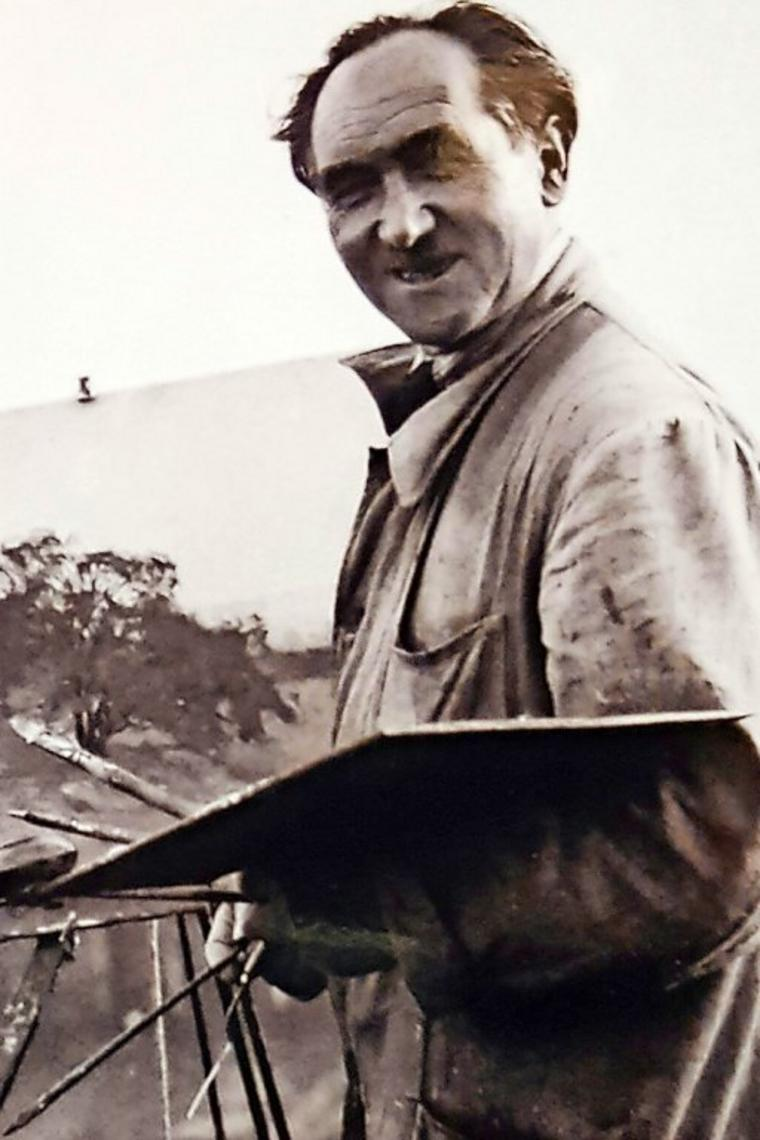
- Born: Otto Altenkirch; 2 January 1875; Ziesar
- Died: 20 July 1945 (aged 70); Siebenlehn
- Education: University of the Arts
- Occupations: Impressionist painter; Set designer

Otto Altenkirch (2 January 1875 – 20 July 1945) was a German Impressionist painter and set designer.

== Life and work ==
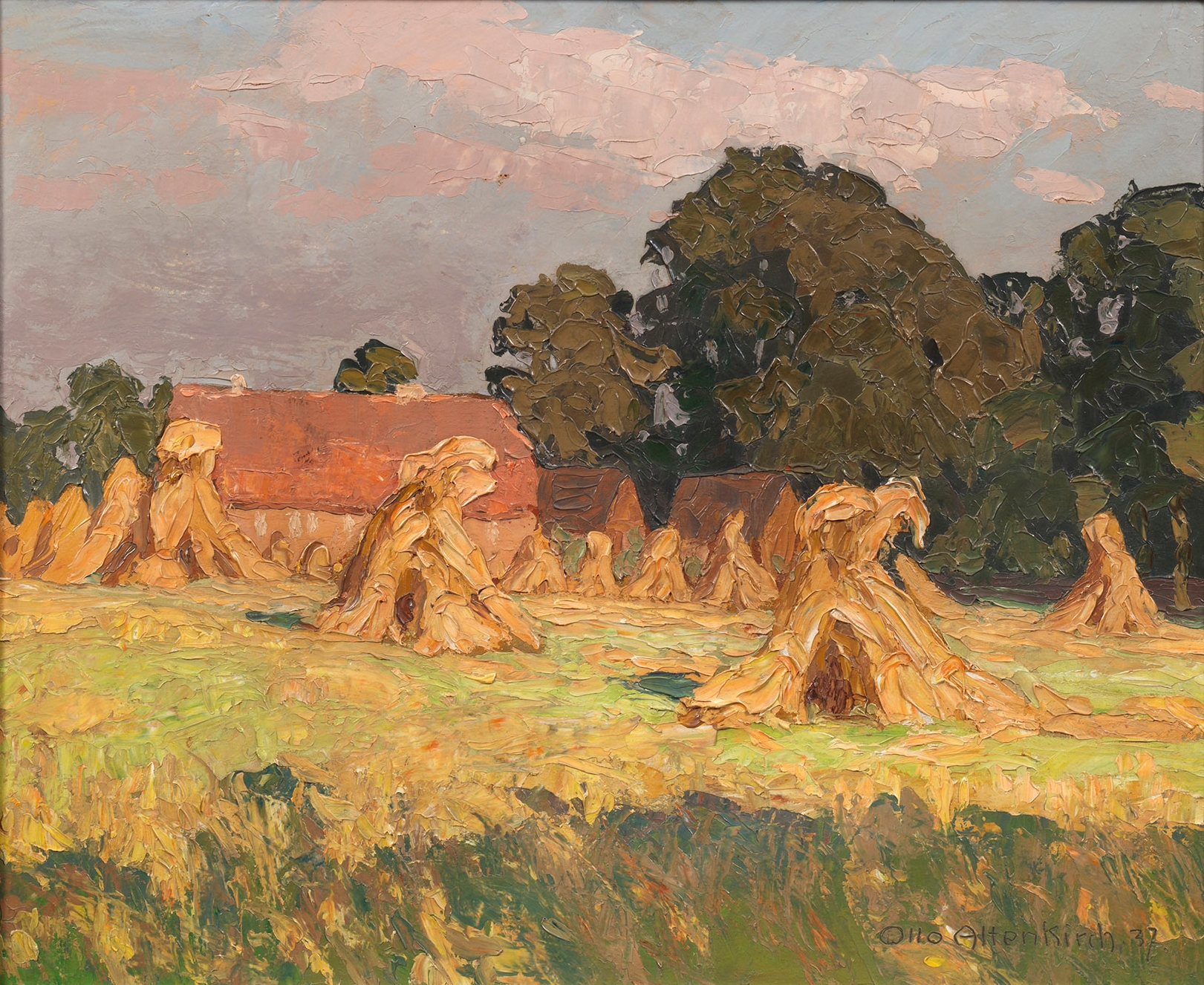
Stooks of Corn in the Hellergut

He was born in Ziesar as the sixth child born to Johann Christian Friedrich Altenkirch, a Master saddler, and his wife Dorothea Wilhelmine Auguste née Müller. In 1889, after completing primary school in Ziesar, he went to Berlin to serve a four-year apprenticeship as a decorative painter. He remained there, as a journeyman, while taking drawing lessons from Hugo Händler (1861 – c. 1941). This was followed by military service in Eastern Europe, and a study trip. He returned to Berlin in 1897.

In 1898, he enrolled at the University of the Arts, where his primary instructor was Paul Vorgang. After 1900, he was a full-time student of Eugen Bracht. In 1902, when Bracht moved to the Dresden Academy of Fine Arts, Altenkirch went with him and became his assistant. His first showing was at an Academy exhibition in 1903, and he was awarded a silver medal. He finally completed his studies in 1906; settling in Dresden and becoming a free-lance artist. He became a founding member of the Künstlervereinigung Dresden (artists' association) in 1910. He was also one of the artists who worked at the Dresden Opera House.

That same year, he was named Court Painter for the Royal Saxon Theatres. His work there included sets for Der Ring des Nibelungen in 1913, the 100th anniversary of the birth of Richard Wagner. In honor of his services, King Frederick Augustus III of Saxony awarded him the title of Professor in 1917.

In 1920, he retired from all of his professional positions, and settled in the small town of Siebenlehn, where he had inherited a house from his father-in-law. It was there that he created most of his familiar landscapes. For two decades, one of his favorite subjects was the avenue of linden trees in Reinsberg. In 1941 and 1943, his works were represented at the Große Deutsche Kunstausstellung; a display of Nazi-approved art in Munich. A few weeks before his death, he created one of his largest paintings, depicting the garden of the Saint Romanus Country Inn, near his home.

== Sources ==
- Otto Altenkirch, Website
- Biographical timeline @ the Siebenlehn website
- Walter Kunze (1953). "Altenkirch, Otto". Neue Deutsche Biographie (in German). Vol. 1. Berlin: Duncker & Humblot. p. 215. (full text online).
