= Reinsberg Castle =

Castle in Saxony, German

Coordinates: 51.0058°N 13.3556°E

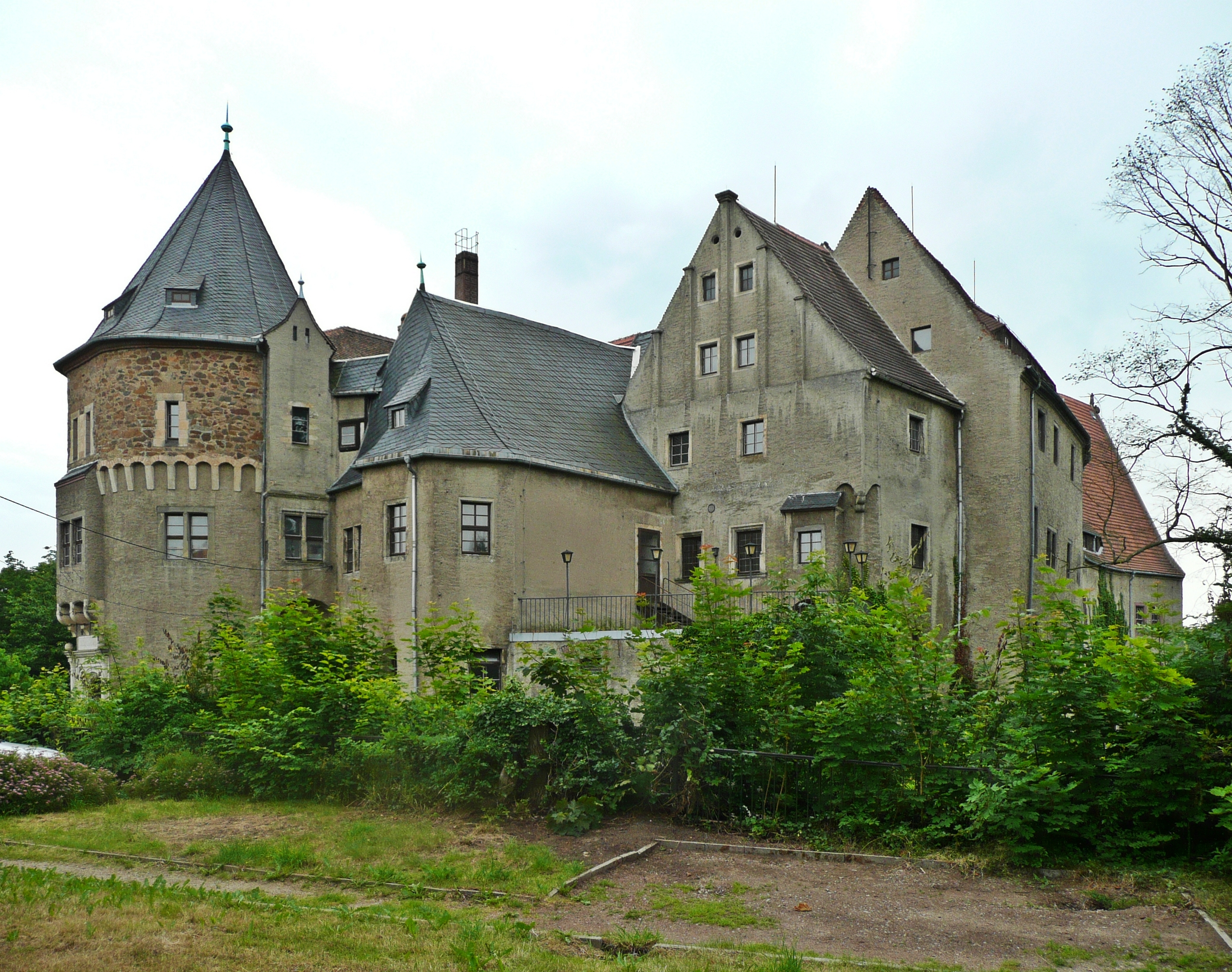
Reinsberg Castle in 2009

Reinsberg Castle is a castle in the village Reinsberg in Mittelsachsen district of Saxony.

== History and ownership ==
The founder and builder of the castle is not known with certainty. However, the establishment of castle and village Reinsberg is probably due to a German nobleman named Reinhardt who had the castle built in order to protect an agricultural settlement. Already in 1197, the castle is recorded as the seat of a noble family when a member of the Reinsberg (Regensberg) family appears as a witness in a document. Their lordship did not endure for long, as they already lost major parts of their ancestral properties in the 14th century to the Schönberg family who acquired the remainder, together with the castle, in 1411. The castle remained a seat of the Schönberg family for more than 500 years. Part of the estate was a folwark in Krummenhennersdorf which was operated as a separate manor.

In the GDR, Reinsberg castle was a holiday hostel for employees of Kombinat Schwarze Pumpe, afterwards it passed into private property and was used as a hotel until 1995. It stands currently (2019) empty. The park remains accessible to visitors on foot. A local initiative has formed to save the building from ruin. The adjacent bathing park has been the open-air swimming pool for Reinsberg since 1978. The hiking trail Grabentour passes in its immediate vicinity.

== Location ==
The steep slope towards Bobritzsch river is a likely reason for the choice of the site for a castle-like fortification. The unprotected eastern side of the castle is defended by a moat which could only be crossed on a drawbridge. The castle was crowned by a substantial tower.
