= Ryssel =

Ryssel may refer to:

- Carl Victor Ryssel, German theologian (1849-1905)
- Rijsel, the Dutch name for the French city of Lille, also Rysel in West Flemish.
