= Litania =

Litania is the Latin term for litany, the plural is litaniae.

Litania may also refer to:

Books

- Litania (1952), collection of poems by Werner Aspenström

Music

- Litaniae, compositions by Wolfgang Amadeus Mozart
- Litania, composition by Heinrich Schütz SWV 458
- Litania, composition by Friedrich Funcke
- Litania, composition by Carin Malmlöf-Forssling
- Litania, composition by Jeffrey Lewis (composer) (1993)
- Litania: Music of Krzysztof Komeda, album by Polish jazz trumpeter and composer Tomasz Stańko
- Litania (Litania (album Jacka Kaczmarskiego)), album by Jacek Kaczmarski 1986
- Litania, album by Margaret Leng Tan
- Litania, album by Giovanni Lindo Ferretti 2004

== See also ==
- Litany (disambiguation)
