= Kleinwaltersdorfer Bach =

River in Germany

Location
- State: Saxony, Germany

Physical characteristics
- Source
  - location: source region: near Freiberg
  - coordinates: 50°54′46.75″N 13°18′24″E
  - elevation: ca. 420 m above sea level (NHN)
- Mouth
  - location: near Großschirma into the Freiberger Mulde
  - coordinates: 50°57′50.25″N 13°18′44″E
  - elevation: ca. 293 m above sea level (NHN)
- Length: 7.6 km

Basin features
- Progression: Freiberger Mulde → Mulde → Elbe → North Sea
- River system: Elbe

The Kleinwaltersdorfer Bach is a 7.6-kilomentre-long, left tributary of the Freiberger Mulde in Saxony, Germany. The stream is assessed as moderately polluted (GKL II).

== Course ==
The stream, locally known as the Waltersbach, rises in Freiberg's Hospital Wood (Hospitalwald) and flows from there northwards through the village of Kleinwaltersdorf. After Kleinwaltersdorf it snakes its way through a water meadow landscape to Großschirma, where it empties into the Freiberger Mulde.

The villagers of Kleinwaltersdorf call the Waltersbach "the stream" (die Bach).

== Literature ==
- Flusslandschaft Kleinwaltersdorfer Bach – Kartierung, Analyse, Bewertung. In: Zeitschrift für Angewandte Geoökologie der TU Bergakademie Freiberg. 1/2004.

== See also ==
- List of rivers of Saxony
