= Bieberstein Castle =

Castle in eastern Germany

Coordinates: 51.0106°N 13.3426°E

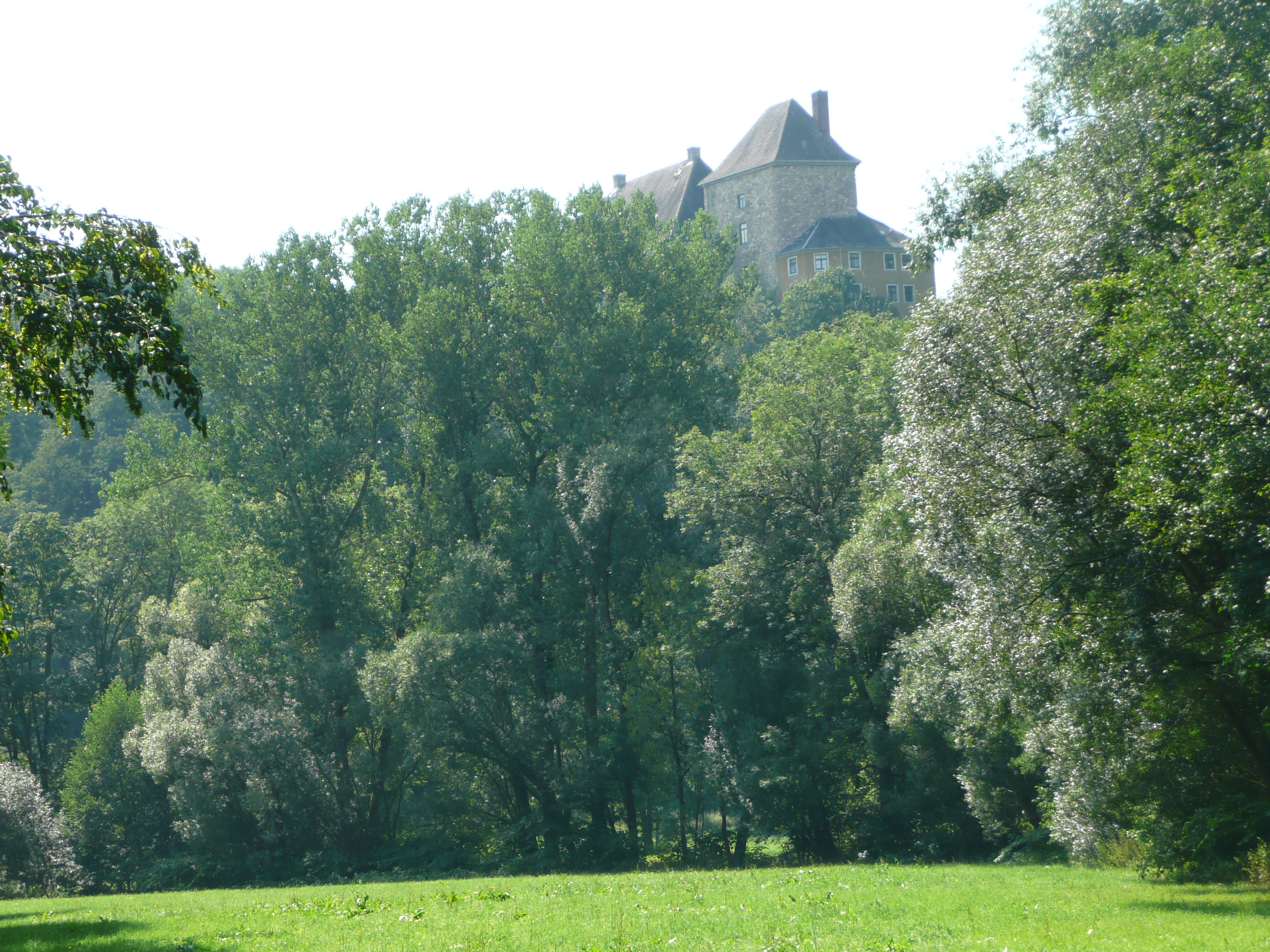
Bieberstein Castle seen from the former Freital–Nossen railway route

Bieberstein Castle (German: Schloss Bieberstein) is located on the left bank of the river Bobritzsch in Bieberstein, part of Reinsberg municipality, in Landkreis Mittelsachsen, Saxony.

A nobleman Günther von Bieberstein who named himself after the castle was first mentioned in a document of 1218. A bergfried with square footprint reminds of the medieval castle which was later transformed into an early modern castle. The latter was joined to the medieval bergfried into a contiguous building around 1600. Originally, the castle consisted of two parts called Ober- and Niederbieberstein. It was successively acquired by various members of the family von Schönberg. After 1650 parts of the lower castle were dismantled. Gotthelf Friedrich von Schönberg (1631–1708), counsellor of the Saxon prince-elector, bought the castle in 1656, had most of its upper part pulled down to the foundation walls in 1666 and had it rebuilt into its present-day shape. The outside staircase on the western side and the interior stairway with four flights were built between 1710 and 1720.

Bieberstein castle served as a youth hostel until 1992. It was acquired by Maritta Rogalla von Bieberstein Koch-Weser wife of Caio Koch-Weser, and is now used as a conference centre.
