= Carl Victor Ryssel =

German theologian (1849–1905)

Karl Victor Ryssel
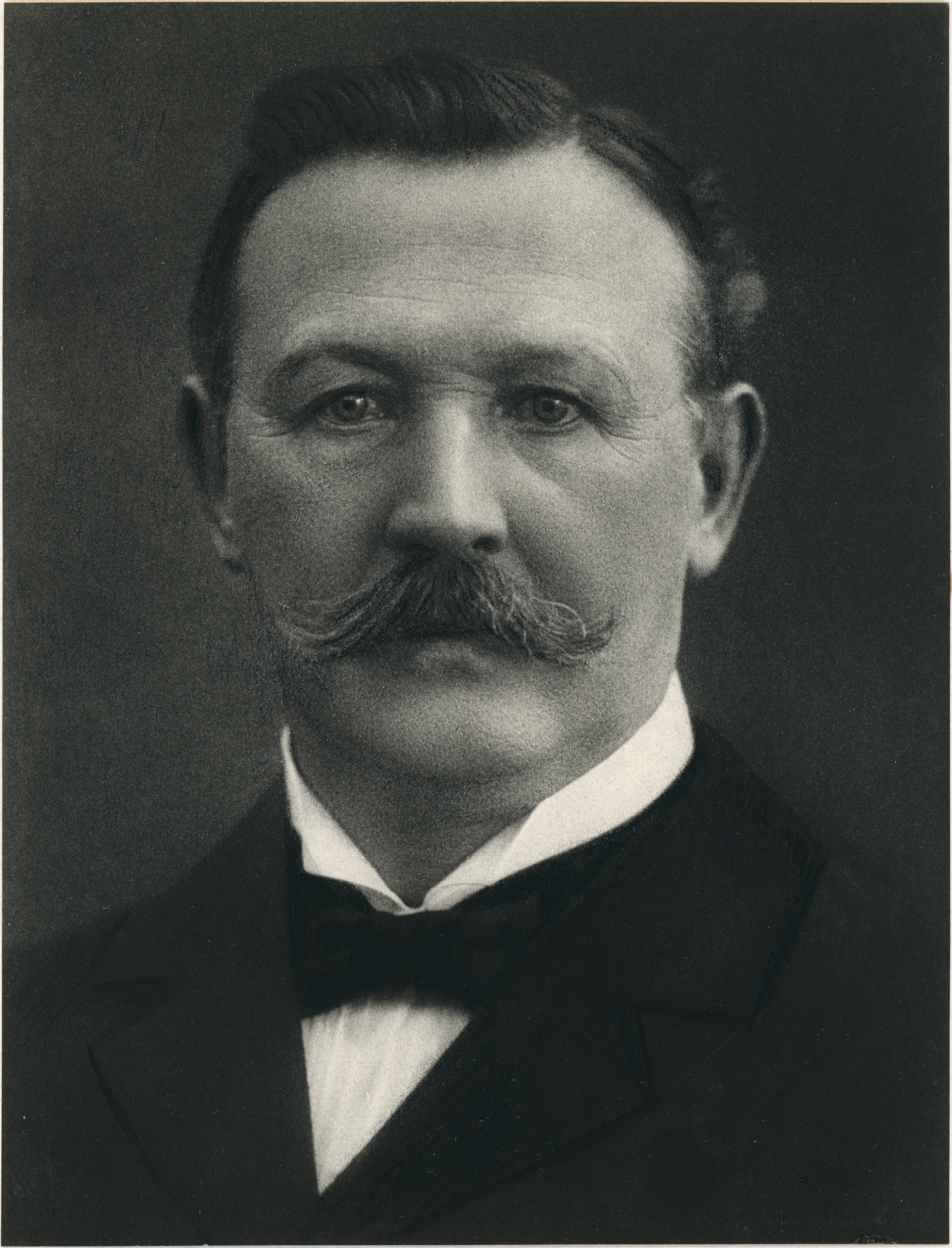
- Born: December 18, 1849; Reinsberg, Germany
- Died: March 1, 1905 (aged 55); Zürich, Switzerland

Karl Victor Ryssel, also Carl Victor Ryssel (18 December 1849 – 1 March 1905) was a Protestant theologian and professor in Leipzig and Zürich.

== Life ==
Ryssel was born in Reinsberg, Germany, near the town of Nossen. From 1861 to 1868 he went to the Gymnasium in Freiberg. From 1867 to 1871 he studied theology and oriental studies at the University of Leipzig. Subsequently, he became a teacher at the Old St Nicholas School in Leipzig (lecturer, 1878–85; associate professor 1885–89). In 1874 he married Clara Friederici, and they had a daughter Else.

In 1889 he went to the University of Zurich. There he was professor of Old Testament studies and oriental languages (1889–1905).

In 1880–81 he published Über den textkritischen Wert der syrischen Übersetzungen griechischer Klassiker ("On the text-critical value of the Syriac translations of Greek classics").
