= Hilbersdorf, Saxony =

Hilbersdorf
- Ortsteil of Bobritzsch-Hilbersdorf
- Interactive map of Hilbersdorf
- Location within Germany Location within Saxony
- Coordinates: 50°54′34″N 13°23′54″E
- Country: Germany
- State: Saxony
- District: Mittelsachsen
- Municipality: Bobritzsch-Hilbersdorf
- Subdivisions: 2

Area
  - Total: 5.54 km^{2} (2.14 sq mi)
- Elevation: 437 m (1,434 ft)

Population (2010-12-31)
  - Total: 1,411
  - Density: 255/km^{2} (660/sq mi)
- Time zone: UTC+01:00 (CET)
  - Summer (DST): UTC+02:00 (CEST)
- Postal codes: 09627
- Dialling codes: 03731
- Vehicle registration: FG

Hilbersdorf is a former municipality in Saxony, Germany. With effect from 1 January 2012, it has merged with Bobritzsch, forming the new municipality of Bobritzsch-Hilbersdorf.
