= Graben Tour =

Mining trail in Saxony, Germany

Graben Tour (Grabentour)
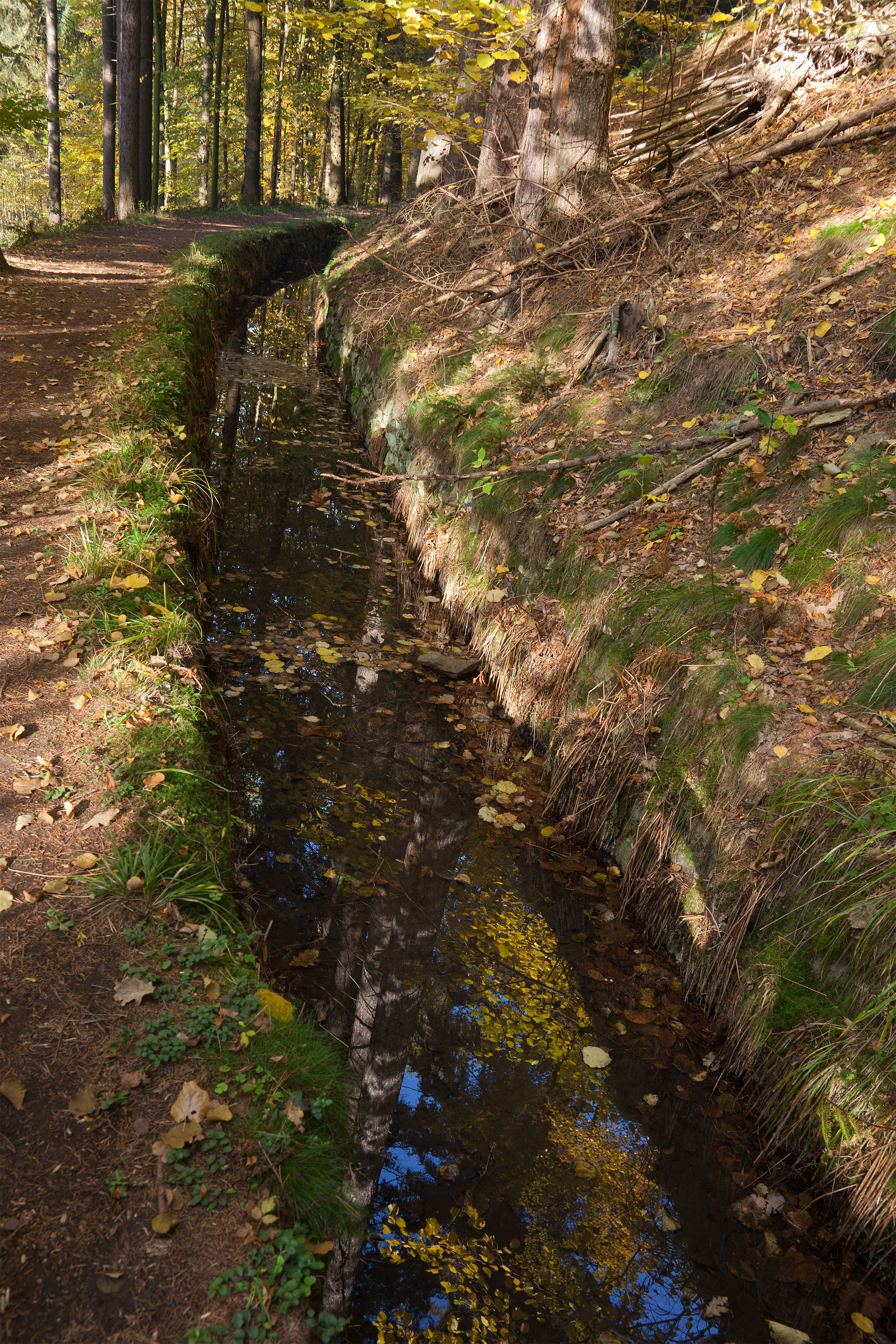

Location
- Location: Bobritzsch valley, Saxony, Germany

Physical characteristics
- Source
  - location: The Bobritzsch stream in Krummenhennersdorf
  - coordinates: 50°59′03″N 13°22′12″E
- Mouth
  - location: in Reinsberg (Saxony) into the Reinsberger Dorfbach stream
  - coordinates: 51°00′27″N 13°22′00″E
- Length: 3557 m

Basin features
- River system: Bobritzsch

The Graben Tour (German: Grabentour) is a mining history footpath in the north of the former district of Freiberg in the German Free State of Saxony. It follows the course of an old mining water channel, in the valley of the Bobritzsch, from Krummenhennersdorf to Reinsberg.

== History ==
The name of the walk is derived from the artificial water channel or Kunstgraben that was laid here between 1844 and 1847 to supply water for the mining industry, Graben being German for "ditch". The channel was used to make water available for overshot wheels (Kunsträder) and reversible wheels (Kehrräder) at the 4th Shaft (IV. Lichtloch) and the two Schwamkrug turbines at the 5th Shaft (V. Lichtloch), which were used to transport the rock extracted from the Rothschönberger Stolln mine and for water management.

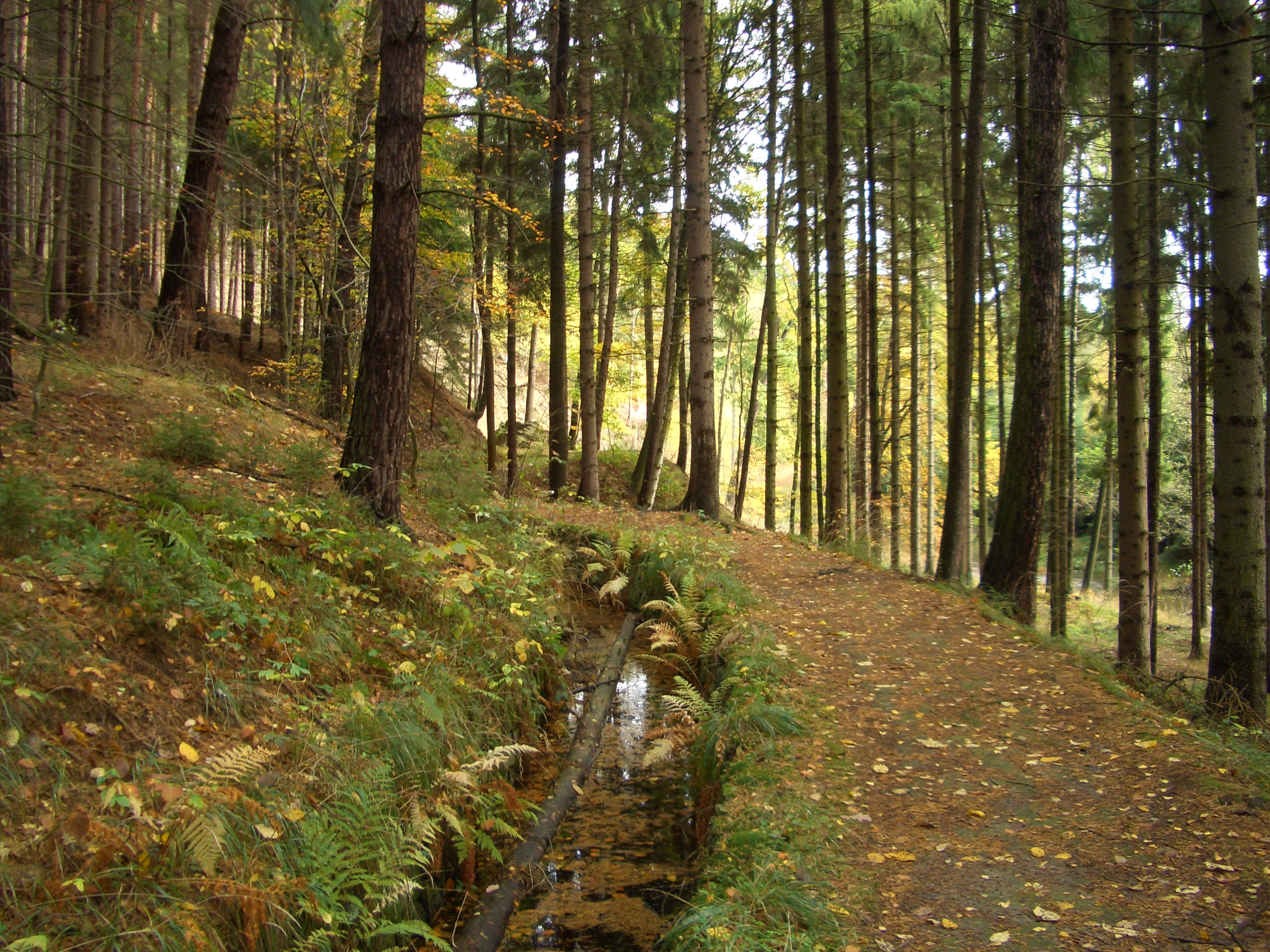
The Graben Tour walk. Left: the old water channel

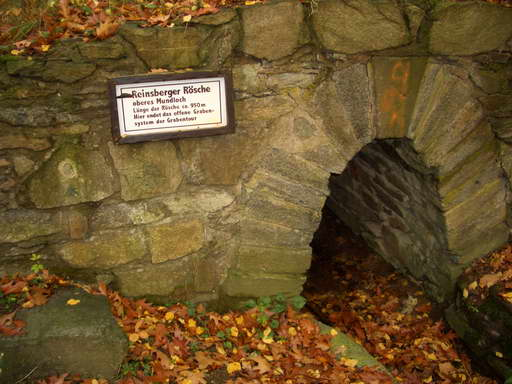
Oberes Mundloch der Reinsberger Rösche

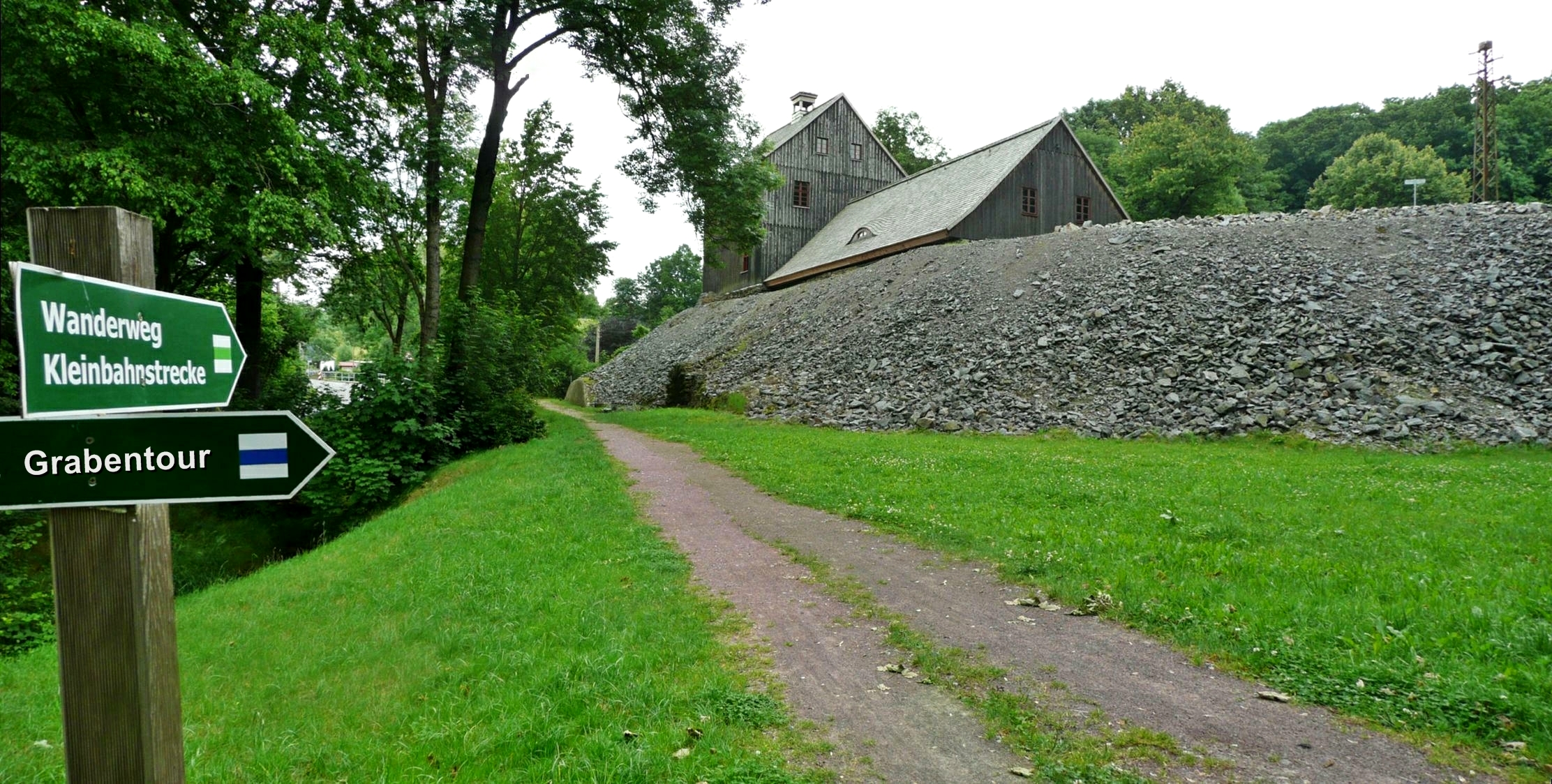
Pithead stocks (Halde), engine house (Treibehaus) and wheelhouse (Radstubenkaue) of IV Shaft of the Rothschönberger Stolln mine.

== Literature ==
- Otfried Wagenbreth (1988), Eberhard Wächtler (ed.), Der Freiberger Bergbau : Technische Denkmale und Geschichte. (in German) (2. ed.), Leipzig: Deutscher Verlag für Grundstoffindustrie, ISBN 3-342-00117-8
- Lysann Petermann (2005), "Der Rothschönberger Stolln", Reihe Bergbauhistorie der Klosterregion Altzella (in German), Reinsberg
