= Joachim Nitsche =

German mathematician

Joachim A. Nitsche (September 2, 1926, Nossen – January 12, 1996) was a German mathematician and professor of mathematics in Freiburg, known for his important contributions to the mathematical and numerical analysis of partial differential equations. The duality argument for estimating the error of the finite element method and a scheme for the weak enforcement of Dirichlet boundary conditions for Poisson's equation bear his name.

== Biography ==
=== Education ===
Nitsche graduated from school at Bischofswerda in 1946. Starting in summer 1947, he studied mathematics the University of Göttingen, where he received his Diplom (under supervision of Franz Rellich) after only six semesters. In 1951, he received his degree (Dr. rer. nat.) at Technische Universität Berlin. After only two years, he received his Habilitation at the Free University of Berlin.

=== Marriage and children ===
In 1952, Nitsche married Gisela Lange, with whom he had three children.

=== Professional career ===
From 1955 to 1957, Nitsche held a teaching position at the Free University of Berlin, which he left for a position at IBM in Böblingen. He became professor at the Albert Ludwigs University of Freiburg in 1958 and received the chair for applied mathematics there in 1962. He remained in this position until he became emeritus in 1991.

== Works ==
=== Publications ===
Praktische Mathematik, BI Hochschulskripten 812*, Bibliographisches Institut, Mannheim, Zurich, 1968.
