= Romy Penz =

German politician (born 1970)

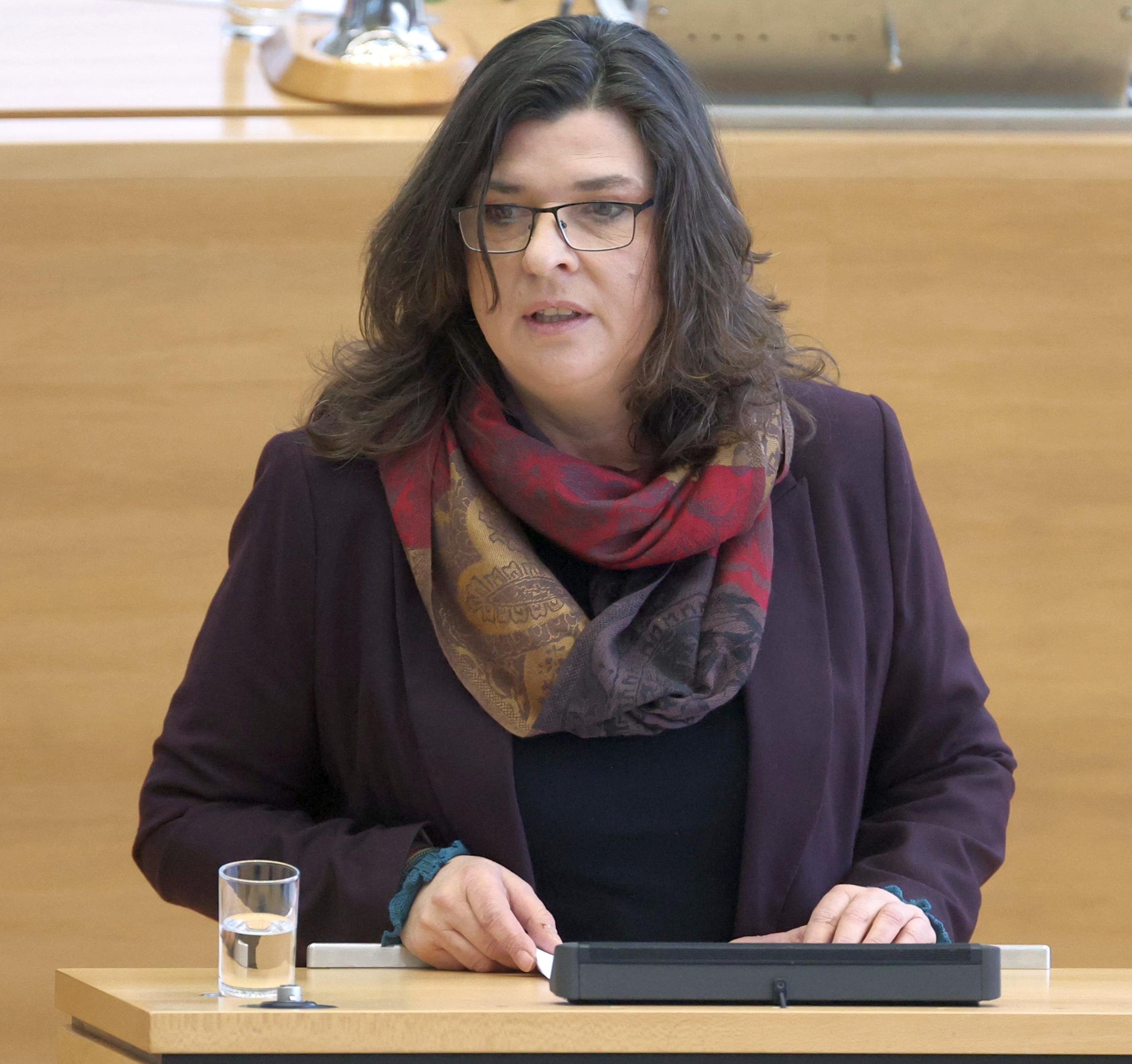
- Penz in 2024

Member of the Landtag of Saxony
- Incumbent
- Assumed office 1 October 2019
- Constituency: Mittelsachsen 2 (2024–present)

Personal details
- Born: 1970 (age 55–56)
- Party: Alternative for Germany (since 2013)

Romy Penz (born 1970) is a German politician serving as a member of the Landtag of Saxony since 2019. She has been a city councillor of Flöha and a district councillor of Mittelsachsen since 2014.
