= Mittelsachsen 2 =

State electoral district of Germany

18: Mittelsachsen 2
- Electoral district for the Landtag of Saxony
- Mittelsachsen 2 in 2024
- District: Mittelsachsen
- Electorate: 58,262 (2024)
- Major settlements: Augustusburg, Brand-Erbisdorf, Flöha, Frankenberg, Hainichen, and Oederan

Current electoral district
- Party: AfD
- Member: Romy Penz

Mittelsachsen 2 is an electoral constituency (German: Wahlkreis) represented in the Landtag of Saxony. It elects one member via first-past-the-post voting. Under the constituency numbering system, it is designated as constituency 18. It is within the district of Mittelsachsen.

== Geography ==
The constituency comprises the towns of Augustusburg, Brand-Erbisdorf, Flöha, Frankenberg, Hainichen, and Oederan, and the districts of Eppendorf, Großhartmannsdorf, Leubsdorf, Niederwiesa, and Oberschöna within Mittelsachsen.

There were 58,262 eligible voters in 2024.

== Members ==
Election	Member	Party	%
2014	Steve Ittershagen	CDU	42.2
2019	Rolf Weigand	AfD	33.7
2024	Romy Penz	AfD	39.8

== Election results ==
=== 2024 election ===
State election (2024): Mittelsachsen 2
Notes:	Blue background denotes the winner of the electorate vote. Pink background denotes a candidate elected from their party list. Yellow background denotes an electorate win by a list member, or other incumbent. A ✓ or ✗ denotes status of any incumbent, win or lose respectively.						
Party	Candidate	Votes	%	±%	Party votes	%	±%
AfD	Romy Penz	17,191	39.8	▲7.5	15,539	35.9	▲4.3
CDU	Susan Leithoff	15,368	35.6	▼0.4	14,539	33.6	▼2.3
BSW	Jörg Scheibe	4,893	11.3		5,533	12.8	
FW	Timo Ahnert	1,608	3.7	▼3.7	957	2.2	▼2.1
SPD	Sven Kaden	1,573	3.6	▼2.9	2,391	5.5	▼1.5
Left	Laura Kunze	1,279	3.0	▼6.5	954	2.2	▼6.6
Greens	Markus Scholz	645	1.5	▼3.0	734	1.7	▼2.4
FDP	Marko Trautmann	359	0.8	▼2.9	264	0.6	▼3.0
Freie Sachsen	Wilko Winkler	282	0.7		1,194	2.8	
APT					429	1.0	
PARTEI					225	0.5	▼0.5
BD					133	0.3	
Values					101	0.2	
dieBasis					85	0.2	
Bündnis C					75	0.2	
Pirates					56	0.1	
V-Partei3					51	0.1	
ÖDP					27	0.1	
BüSo					20	0.0	
Informal votes		527			418		
Total valid votes		43,198			43,307		
Turnout		43,725	75.0	▲5.9			
AfD hold	Majority	1,823	4.2				

=== 2019 election ===
State election (2019): Mittelsachsen 2
Notes:	Blue background denotes the winner of the electorate vote. Pink background denotes a candidate elected from their party list. Yellow background denotes an electorate win by a list member, or other incumbent. A ✓ or ✗ denotes status of any incumbent, win or lose respectively.						
Party	Candidate	Votes	%	±%	Party votes	%	±%
AfD	Rolf Weigand	13,114	33.7		12,552	32.2	▲22.6
CDU	✗ Steve Ittershagen	12,477	32.1	▼10.1	12,154	31.2	▼11.4
Left	Jana Pinka	4,615	11.9	▼13.0	3,395	8.7	▼9.6
FW	Holger Gustmann	3,175	8.2		2,080	5.3	▲3.9
SPD	Alexander Geissler	2,406	6.2	▼4.7	2,642	6.8	▼4.5
Greens	Markus Scholz	1,854	4.8	▼1.6	2,467	6.3	▲1.5
FDP	Benjamin Karabinski	1,216	3.1	▼2.5	1,522	3.9	Steady
PARTEI					552	1.4	▲0.6
APT					516	1.3	▲0.3
Verjüngungsforschung					213	0.5	
NPD					196	0.5	▼4.1
ÖDP					145	0.4	
The Blue Party					142	0.4	
Pirates					107	0.3	▼.0.8
Humanists					81	0.2	
Awakening of German Patriots - Central Germany					62	0.2	
BüSo					39	0.1	▼0.3
PDV					38	0.1	
DKP					German Communist Party	26	0.1
Informal votes		475			403		
Total valid votes		38,857			38,929		
Turnout		39,332	69.3	▲17.5			
AfD gain from CDU	Majority	637	1.6				

=== 2014 election ===
State election (2014): Mittelsachsen 2
Notes:	Blue background denotes the winner of the electorate vote. Pink background denotes a candidate elected from their party list. Yellow background denotes an electorate win by a list member, or other incumbent. A ✓ or ✗ denotes status of any incumbent, win or lose respectively.						
Party	Candidate	Votes	%	±%	Party votes	%	±%
CDU	Steve Ittershagen	12,662	42.2		12,905	42.6	
Left		7,473	24.9		5,542	18.3	
SPD		3,262	10.9		3,427	11.3	
AfD					2,894	9.6	
NPD		1,964	6.5		1,400	4.6	
Greens		1,909	6.4		1,457	4.8	
FDP		1,687	5.6		1,195	3.9	
FW					429	1.4	
Pirates		587	2.0		320	1.1	
APT					302	1.0	
PARTEI					231	0.8	
BüSo		481	1.6		92	0.3	
Pro Germany Citizens' Movement					64	0.2	
DSU					45	0.1	
Informal votes		635			357		
Total valid votes		30,035			30,303		
Turnout		30,660	51.8	▼10.8			
CDU win new seat	Majority	5,189	17.3				

== See also ==
- Politics of Saxony
- Landtag of Saxony
