= Litani =

Litani may refer to:

- Litani River (Nahr al-Līţānī; from Greek: Λέοντες Leontes), a river in Lebanon
  - Battle of the Litani River (1941)
  - 1978 South Lebanon conflict or Operation Litani, invasion by Israel of Lebanon up to the Litani River
  - Operation Change of Direction 11 or Litani offensive, by Israel during the 2006 Lebanon War
- Litani (Maroni) (or Itany), a river forming part of the boundary between Suriname and French Guiana

== See also ==
- Litany (disambiguation)
