= Rolf Weigand =

German politician (born 1984)

Member of the Landtag of Saxony
- In office 1 January 2018 – 1 October 2024
- Preceded by: Detlev Spangenberg
- Constituency: Mittelsachsen 2 (2019–2024)

Personal details
- Born: 8 June 1984 (age 42) Chemnitz
- Party: Alternative for Germany (since 2013)

Rolf Weigand (born 8 June 1984 in Chemnitz) is a German politician serving as mayor of Großschirma since 2024. From 2018 to 2024, he was a member of the Landtag of Saxony.
