= Litany (disambiguation) =

A litany is part of Christian liturgy.

== Music ==
Compositional forms

- Litany Tetrachord#Compositional forms

Classical music

- Litany, composition by John Musto
- Litany, composition by Arvo Pärt
- Litany, composition by Toru Takemitsu
- Litany, composition by Thomas Tallis
- Litany, album by The Hilliard Ensemble
- Litanies, organ composition by Jehan Alain

Popular music

- Litany (album), by Vader

== See also ==
- Litani (disambiguation)
- Litania (disambiguation)
