= Friedrich Wilhelm Putzger =

German cartographer (1849–1913)

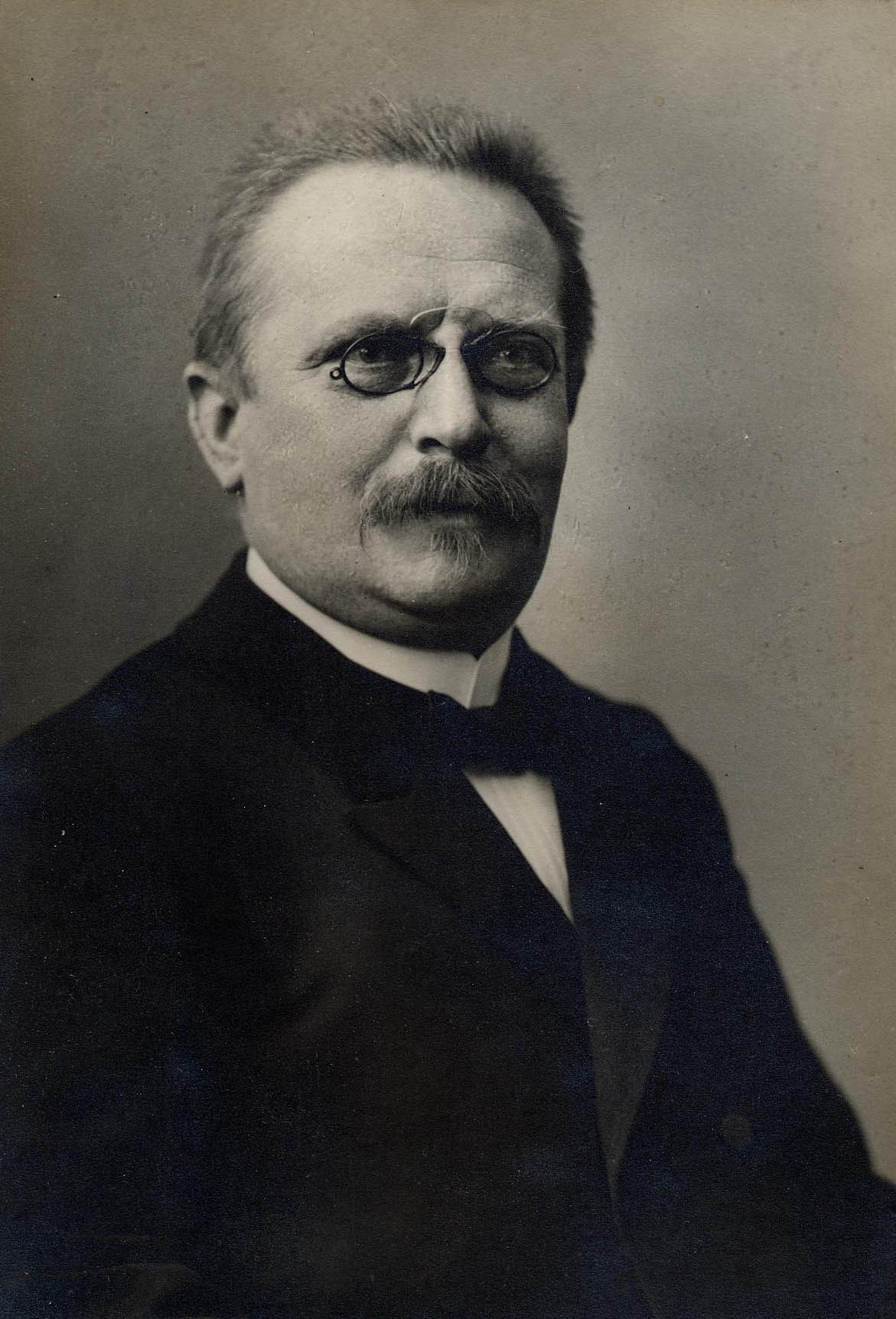
Friedrich Wilhelm Putzger at about 1900

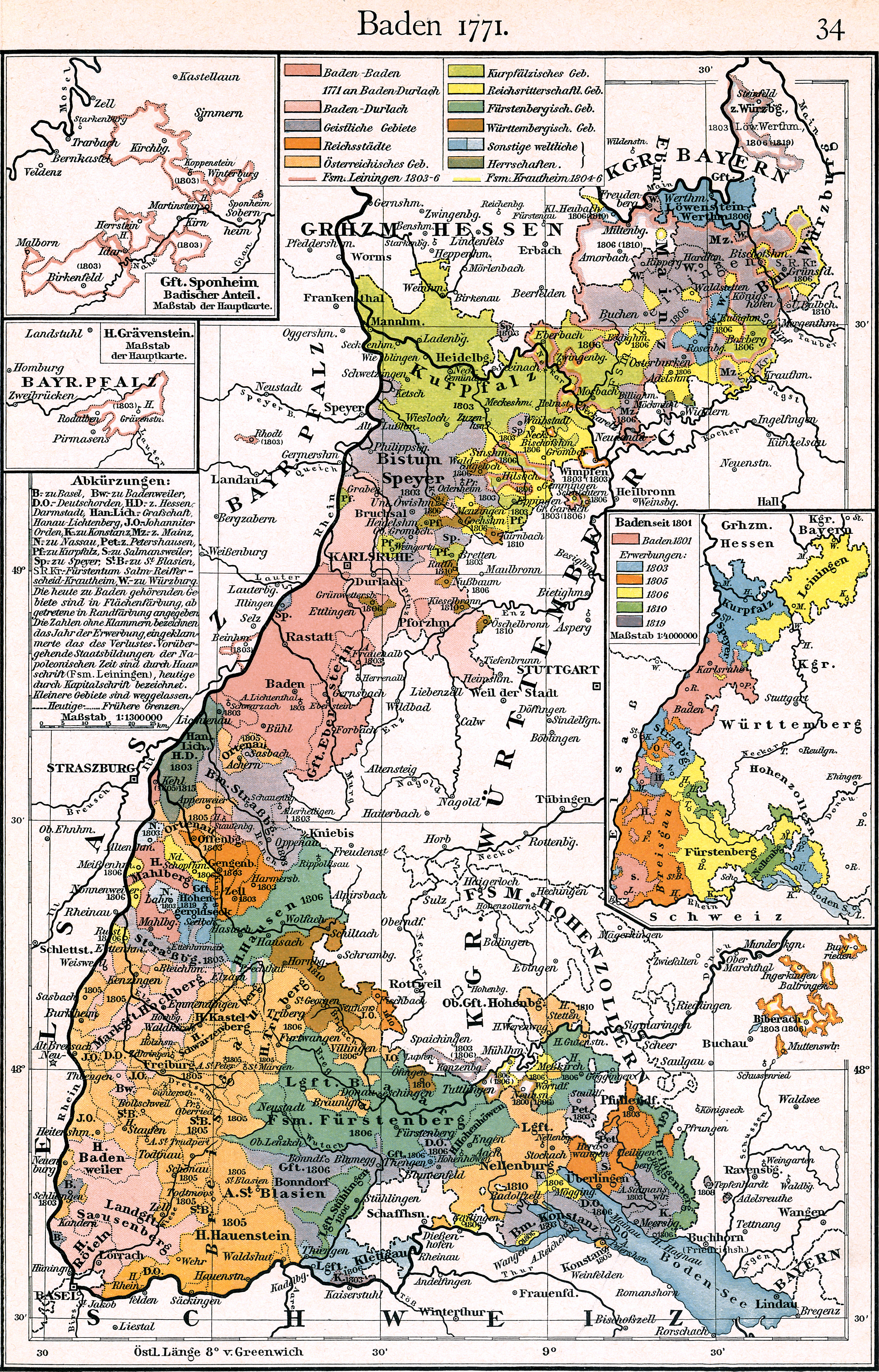
Baden in 1771

Friedrich Wilhelm Putzger (10 January 1849, Siebenlehn – 3 August 1913, Plauen) was a German teacher and cartographer.

He updated the Physikalisch-statistischer Atlas des deutschen Reiches (Richard Andree, Oskar Peschel, Verlag Velhagen & Klasing) and in 1877 in Leipzig first published the F. W. Putzgers Historischer Schul-Atlas intended for use in schools.

Due to its low price, it was a success. It is still commonly used in schools. The current edition is Putzger - Atlas und Chronik zur Weltgeschichte. Cornelsen, Berlin 2002,

== Literature ==
- Irmgard Hantsche, Friedrich Wilhelm Putzger (1849 bis 1913). Atlasautor und sächsischer Schulmann, in: Sächsische Heimatblätter 44 (1998), Heft 1, S. 1–12.
- Irmgard Hantsche, Friedrich Wilhelm Putzger und der Putzger. Zur Anfangsgeschichte eines Historischen Atlas, in: Internationale Schulbuchforschung 19 (1997), Heft 1, S. 5–34.
