= Friedrich Funcke =

German composer

Friedrich Funcke (1642 – 20 October 1699) was a German composer.

== Life ==
Funcke was born in Nossen. After studies in Wittenberg in 1660–61 he became Kantor at Perleberg. In 1664 he was appointed Kantor at St Johannis, Lüneburg where he stayed till 1694. He moved to Römstedt where he spent his last years. He died at Lüneburg.

He is the composer of a St Matthew Passion that is quite important in the history of the oratorio. The passion has come down to us in two versions: one without and one with continuo (probably not written by Funcke).

== Works ==
=== Secular works ===
- Glückwünschender Zuruff (Wohlauff, mein schwacher Geist), S, 2 vn, bc (1664)
- Trauer-Ode (Ach! was ist doch unser Leben), 6vv, bc (1664)
- Klag- und Trost-Zeilen (Ach! Hertzeleid! Ja diss Leben-lose Leben), 6vv, bc (1665)
- Seliger Abschied (Ach! Herr, ich warte auff dein Heil), 5vv, bc (1665)
- Seeliger Abschied (Mensch, was ist des Lebens Zier), 6vv (1665)
- Letzte Pflicht (Hier kurtze Zeit, ach leid), 6vv (1666)
- Danck- und Denck-Mahl, 8vv, insts a 5, bc (Hamburg, 1666)
- Hochzeit-Freude (Was des Himmels Raht erfunden), S, 2 inst, bc (1667)
- Trauer-Thoon (Was ist doch diese Welt), 5vv (1669)
- Der ewig-feste und unüberwindliche Gottes Schutz (Ist Gott für uns), 4vv, 5 insts, bc (Hamburg, 1682)
- New Year cantata (Herr, hebe an zu segnen) 4vv, chorus 4vv, str, bc, 1684, D-Lr

=== Sacred works ===
- St Matthew Passion, c1668–74, D-Lr (anon., attrib. Funcke by Birke)
- St Luke Passion, 1683, music lost
- 43 melodies, 7 texts, in Lüneburgisches Gesangbuch (Lüneburg, 1686)
- Litania, 8vv (2 choirs), insts

=== Theoretical works ===
- Janua Latino-germanica ad artem musicam, clavibus facilioribus in usum scholae ... Lunaeburgensi (Hamburg, 1680), lost

== Sources ==
- Martin Ruhnke's article in New Grove Dictionary of Music
- H. Walter: Musikgeschichte der Stadt Lüneburg vom Ende des 16. bis zum Anfang des 18. Jahrhunderts (Tutzing, 1967)
- J. Birke: ‘Eine unbekannte anonyme Matthäuspassion aus der zweiten Hälfte des 17. Jahrhunderts’
- H. Walter: Musikgeschichte der Stadt Lüneburg vom Ende des 16. bis zum Anfang des 18. Jahrhunderts (Tutzing, 1967)
