= Großschirma =

- Town
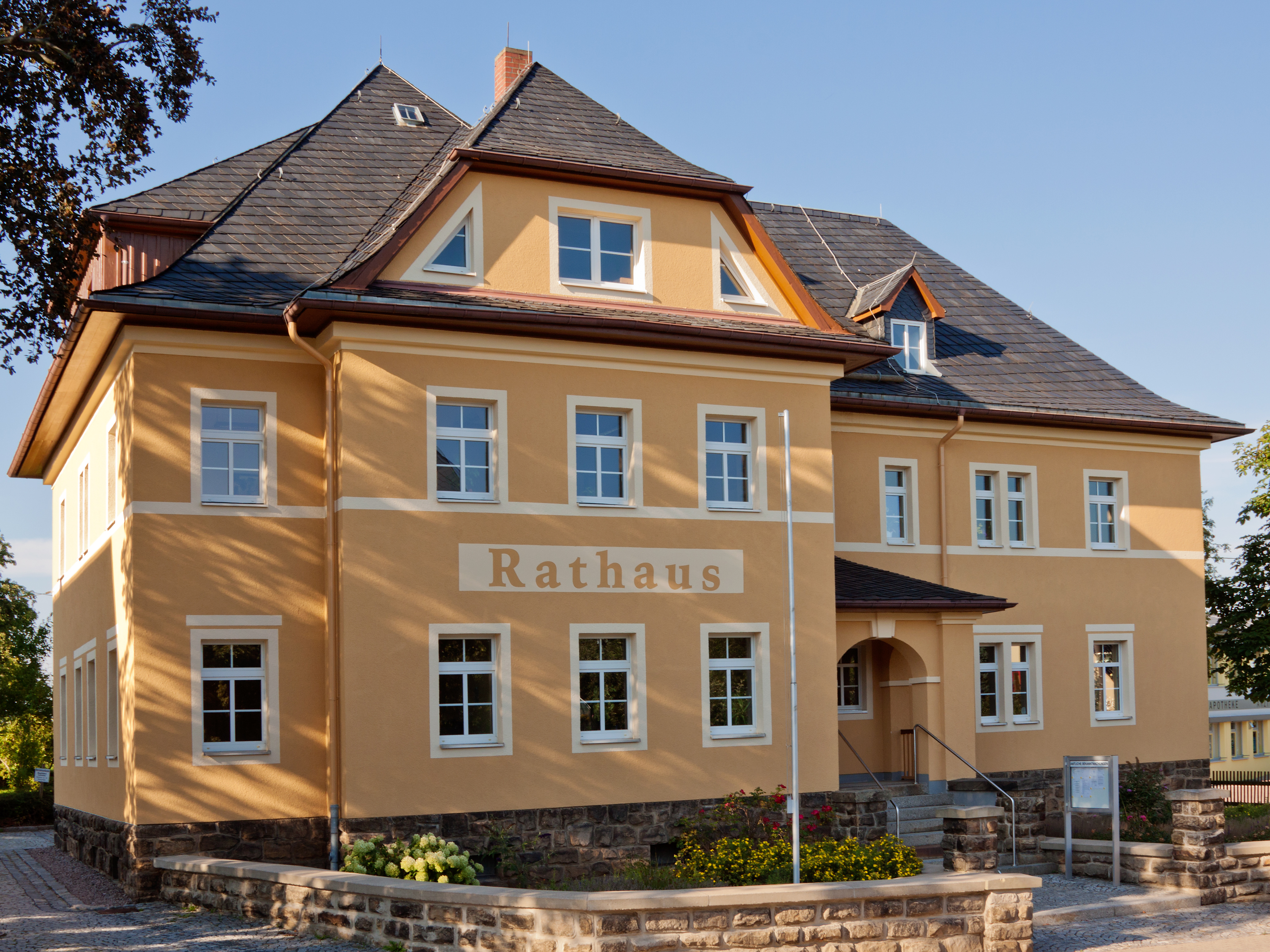
- Großschirma town hall

- Coat of arms

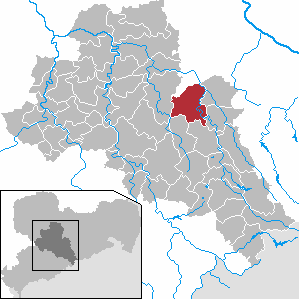
- Location of Großschirma within Mittelsachsen district
- Interactive map of Großschirma
- Location within Germany Location within Saxony
- Coordinates: 50°57′59″N 13°16′41″E
- Country: Germany
- State: Saxony
- District: Mittelsachsen
- Subdivisions: 9

Government
  - Mayor (2024–): Rolf Weigand (AfD)

Area
  - Total: 61.63 km^{2} (23.80 sq mi)
- Elevation: 330 m (1,080 ft)

Population (2025-12-31)
  - Total: 5,203
  - Density: 84.42/km^{2} (218.7/sq mi)
- Time zone: UTC+01:00 (CET)
  - Summer (DST): UTC+02:00 (CEST)
- Postal codes: 09603
- Dialling codes: 037328
- Vehicle registration: FG
- Website: www.grossschirma.de

Großschirma (German pronunciation: [ˈɡʁoːsˌʃɪʁma], lit. 'Big Schirma', in contrast to "Little Schirma") is a town in the district of Mittelsachsen, in Saxony, Germany. It is situated 7 km northwest of Freiberg. It was formed from the administrative union of the municipality of Großschirma and the town of Siebenlehn, including their districts, on 1 September 2003.

== History ==
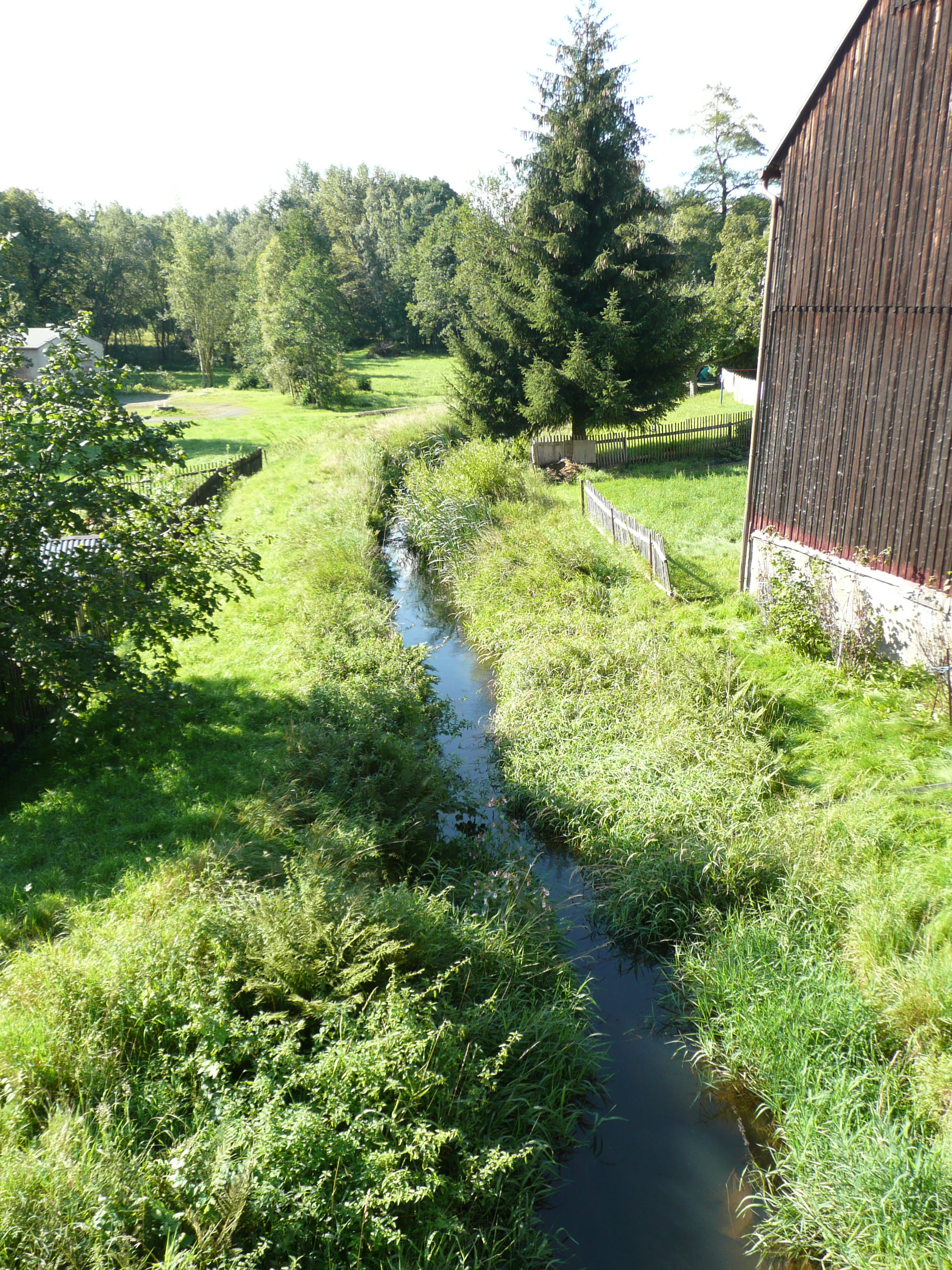
Churprinzer Bergwerkskanal

The eponymous village Großschirma was founded in the middle of the 12th century. Claims by local historians that it was already founded in 956 could not be proved. Until the Protestant Reformation Großschirma belonged to Altzella Abbey. In 1555, prince-elector Augustus sold Großschirma and 14 other villages that were part of the estate of the dissolved abbey to his councillor Ulrich von Mordeisen. Rudolph Mordeisen, one of the sons of the latter, sold Großschirma and at least nine more villages in the property of his family to prince-elector Christian.

Großschirma benefited from the growth of mining in the Freiberg Mining Field. The state-owned mine Churprinz Friedrich August Erbstolln (short: Churprinz) on the west bank of the river Freiberger Mulde was one of the most profitable mines in the field. The ore extracted there was conveyed to the smelters in Halsbrücke on an artificial waterway, the Churprinzer Bergwerkskanal.

In 2003, the hitherto separate town Siebenlehn offered to join the municipality of Großschirma due to financial difficulties. The two municipalities merged on 1 September 2003, whereby the town privileges of Siebenlehn were transferred to the joint municipality. This was the first case of a town being incorporated into a rural municipality in Saxony.

=== Districts and their incorporations ===
Former municipality	Date of incorporation	Note	Inhabitants (2009)
Breitenbach	1 January 1913	incorporated into Siebenlehn	
Großschirma, Gutsbezirk	around 1922		1467
Großvoigtsberg	1. March 1994		690
Hohentanne	1 January 1994		263
Kleinvoigtsberg	1. März 1994		264
Obergruna	1 January 1994	incorporated into Siebenlehn	498
Reichenbach	1 January 1999		592
Rothenfurth	1 July 1950		313
Seifersdorf	1 March 1994	incorporated into Reichenbach	315
Siebenlehn	1 September 2003		1527 (with Breitenbach)
Teichhäuser			

== Infrastructure ==
Bundesstraße 101 traverses the area of the municipality from north to south. Motorway A4 runs along the northern boundary of the town, with a junction north-west of Siebenlehn. Nossen–Moldau railway also traverses the town from north to south and has stations in Großvoigtsberg and Großschirma. It is principally used by museum trains and occasional freight trains.

A network of hiking paths and cycling routes, integrated into long-distance routes is maintained by local associations.

=== Sons and daughters of the city ===
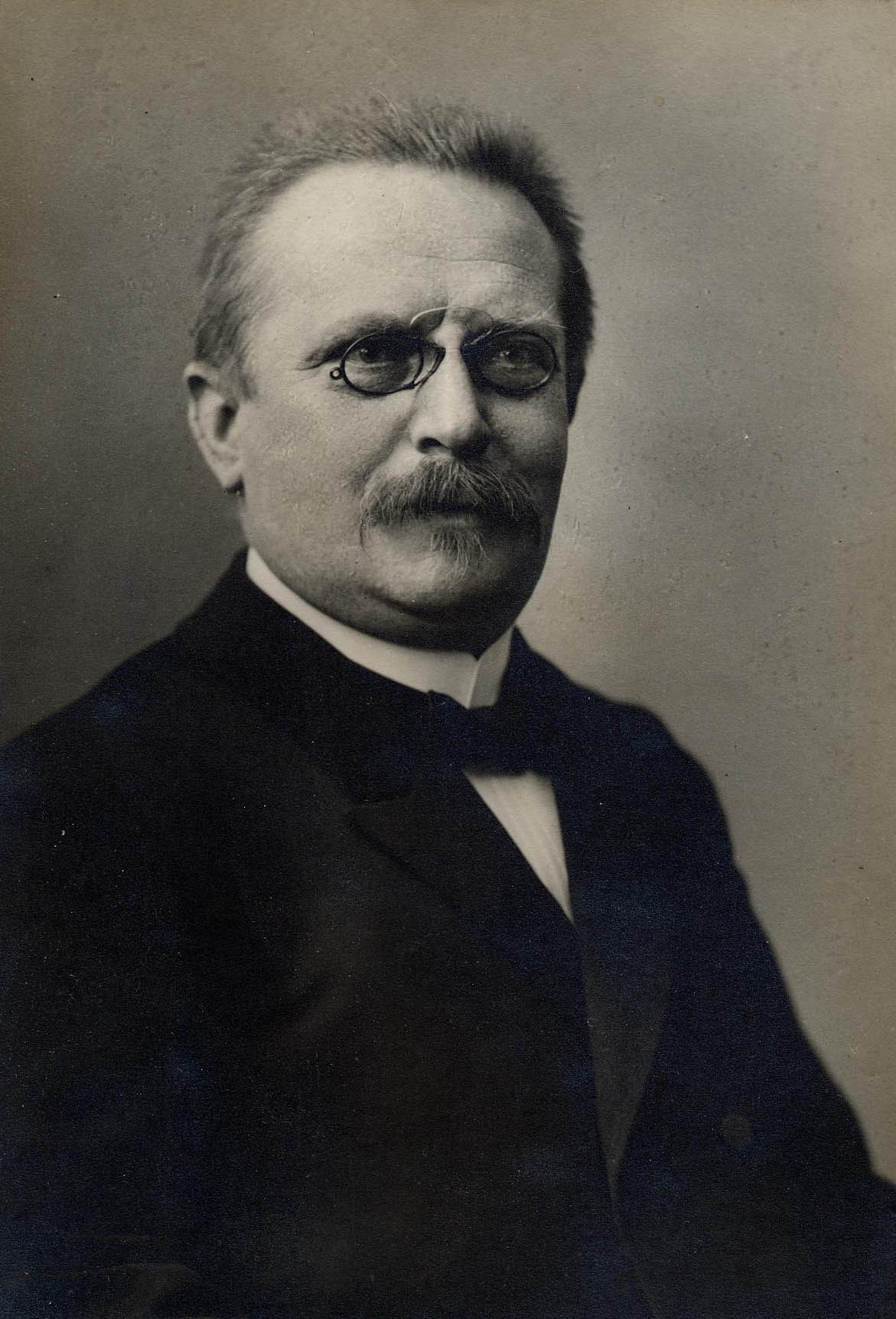
Friedrich Wilhelm Putzger around 1900

Otto Rühle (1874–1943) born in Siebenlehn. Foremost radical Marxist associated with Rosa Luxemburg and Alfredd Ardler.

- Amalie Dietrich (1821–1891), born in Siebenlehn, naturalist, botanist, zoologist and plant hunter
- Friedrich Wilhelm Putzger (1849–1913), born in Siebenlehn, educator, schoolbook author
