= Nossen =

- Town
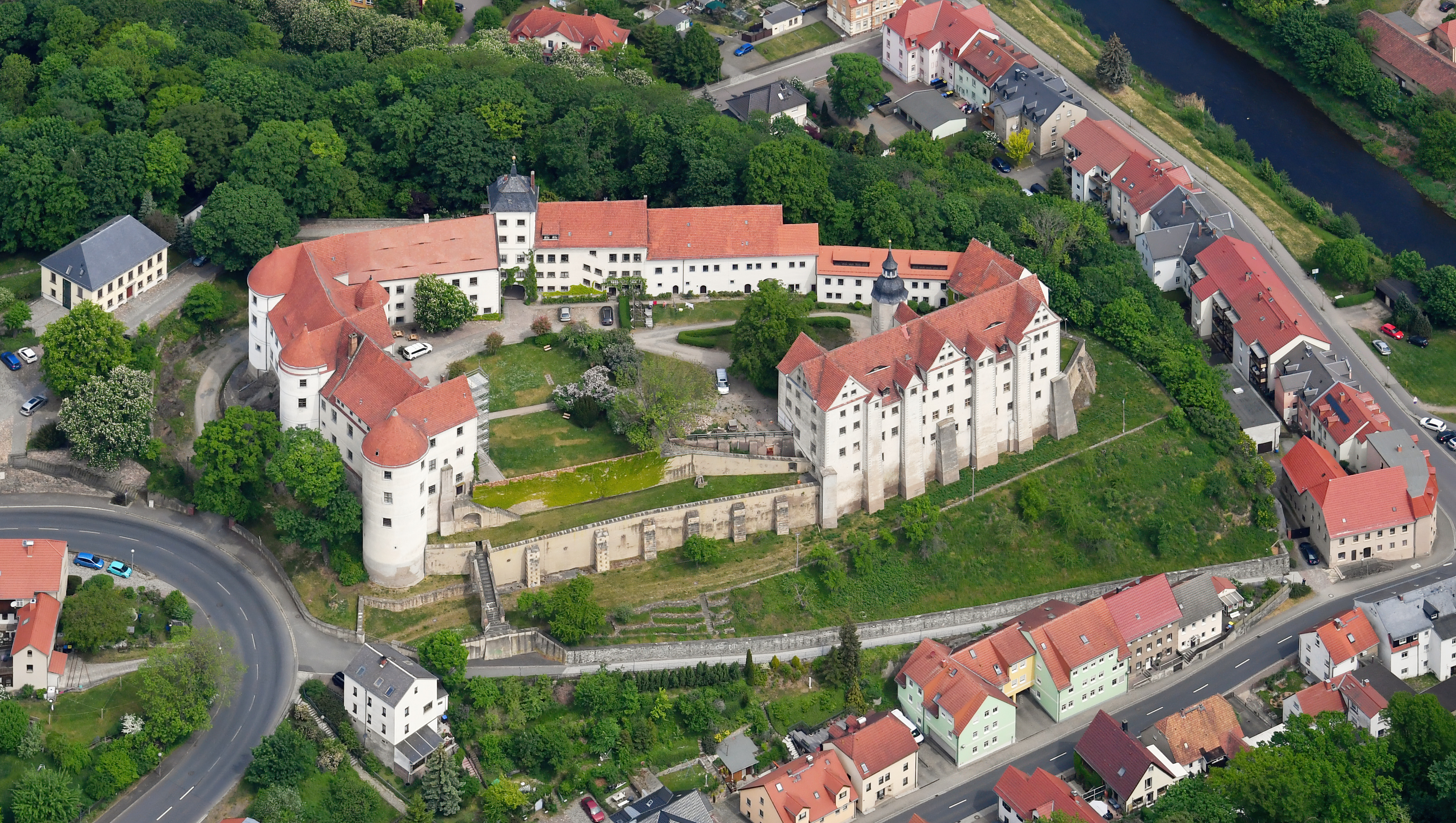

- Coat of arms

- Location of Nossen within Meissen district
- Interactive map of Nossen
- Location within Germany Location within Saxony
- Coordinates: 51°03′N 13°18′E
- Country: Germany
- State: Saxony
- District: Meissen

Government
  - Mayor (2020–27): Christian Bartusch (SPD)

Area
  - Total: 122.74 km^{2} (47.39 sq mi)
- Elevation: 259 m (850 ft)

Population (2025-12-31)
  - Total: 10,370
  - Density: 84.49/km^{2} (218.8/sq mi)
- Time zone: UTC+01:00 (CET)
  - Summer (DST): UTC+02:00 (CEST)
- Postal codes: 01623, 01665, 01683
- Dialling codes: 035242, 035246, 035241
- Vehicle registration: MEI, GRH, RG, RIE
- Website: www.nossen.de

Nossen (German pronunciation: [ˈnɔsn̩]; Upper Sorbian: Nosyn, pronounced [ˈnɔsɨn]) is a town in the district of Meissen, in Saxony, Germany. It is located 80 km southeast of Leipzig. The town is dominated by a large Renaissance castle. Nossen is best known for its proximity to a motorway junction where the A14 merges onto the A4.

== Geography ==
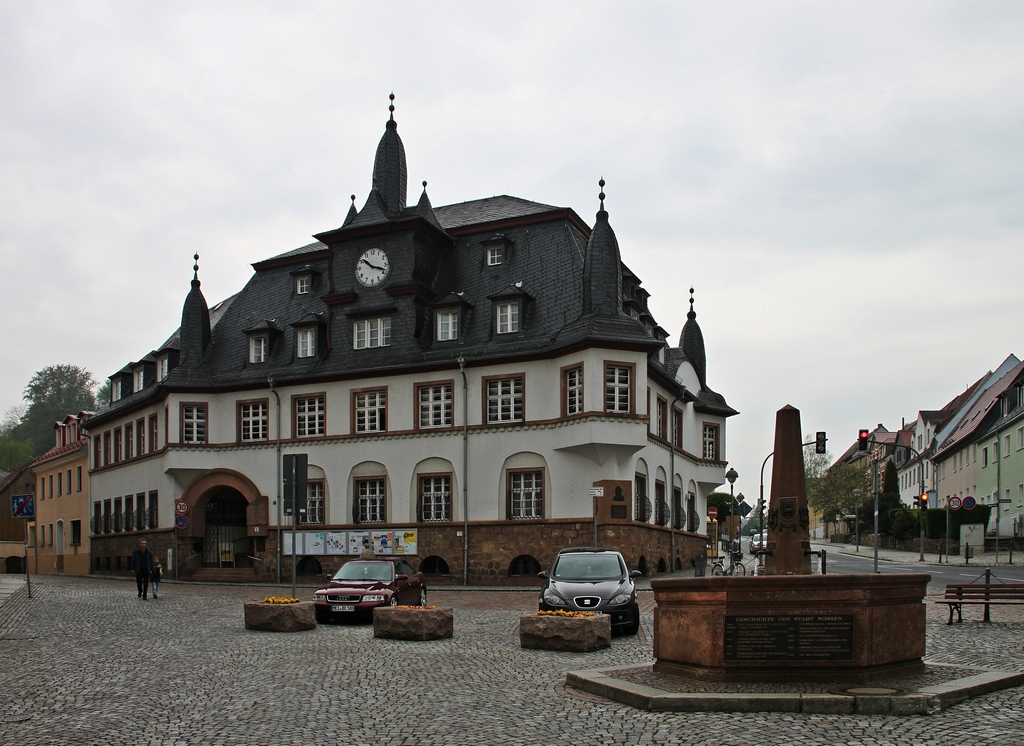
Townhall

=== Neighboring towns ===
Nearest towns are Roßwein, Großschirma, Reinsberg and Striegistal in the Mittelsachsen district and Käbschütztal, Lommatzsch and Klipphausen in the Meißen district.

== History ==
During World War II, a subcamp of Flossenbürg concentration camp was located here.

=== Historical population ===
From 1995, recorded on 31 December, unless otherwise noted:

Historical population

Year	Pop.	±%
1834	1,778	—
1885	3,945	+121.9%
1960	7,881	+99.8%
1990	6,999	−11.2%
1998	6,552	−6.4%

Year	Pop.	±%
2000	6,487	−1.0%
2002	7,781	+19.9%
2004	7,626	−2.0%
2006	7,363	−3.4%
2009	7,142	−3.0%

== Personalities ==
=== Sons and daughters of the city ===
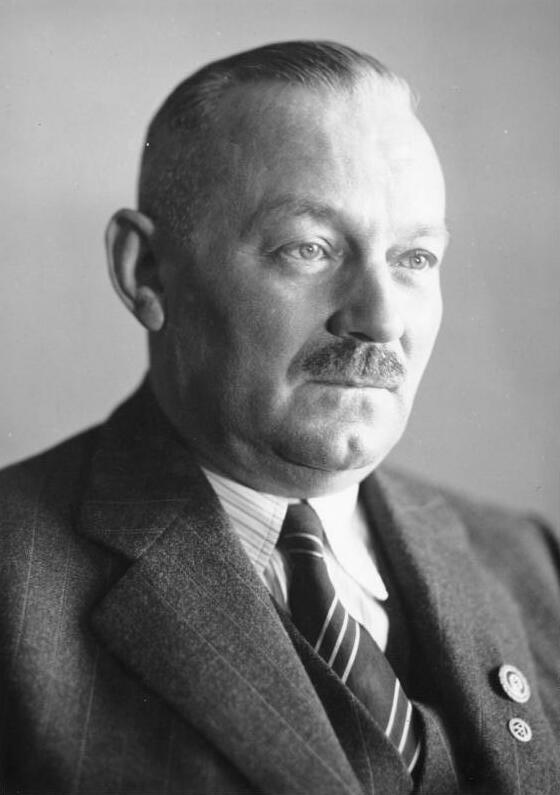
Manfred von Killinger (1940)

- Friedrich Funcke (1642–1699), clergyman, cantor and composer
- Paul Richter (1859–1944), architect
- Manfred von Killinger (1886–1944) Nazi politician and diplomat, born on Gut Lindigt
- Joachim Nitsche (1926–1996), German mathematician
- Wolfgang Mieder (born 1944) professor of German Language and Folklore at the University of Vermont
