= Gimmlitz =

River in Germany

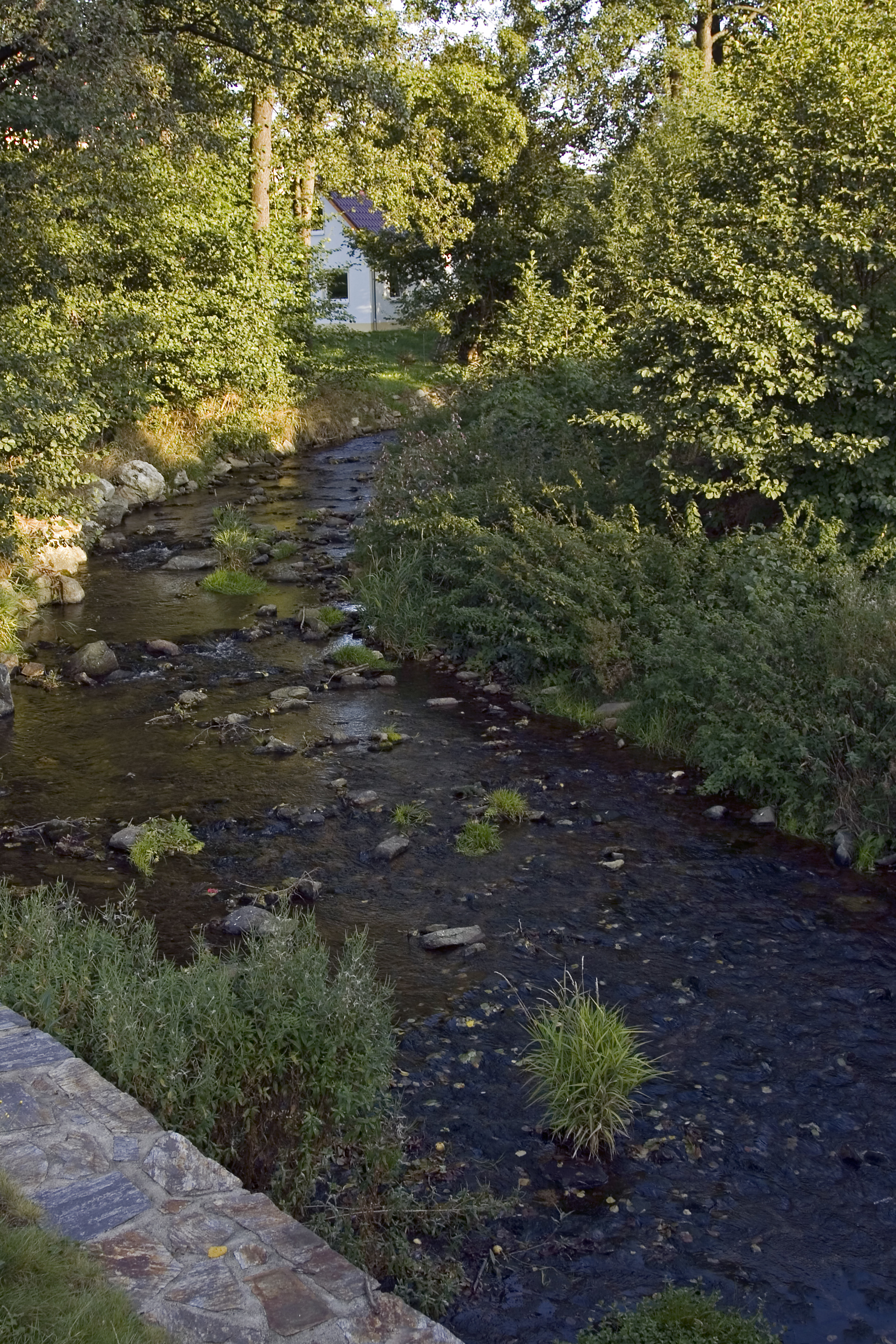

Location
- Country: Germany
- States: Saxony

Physical characteristics
- Mouth
  - location: Freiberger Mulde
  - coordinates: 50.8477°N 13.4027°E

Basin features
- Progression: Freiberger Mulde→ Mulde→ Elbe→ North Sea

The Gimmlitz is a river of Saxony, Germany. It is a right tributary of the Freiberger Mulde, which it joins in Lichtenberg.

== See also ==
- List of rivers of Saxony
