= Bobritzsch (municipality) =

- Municipality
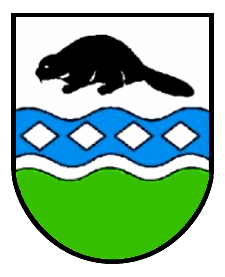
- Coat of arms
- Interactive map of Bobritzsch
- Location within Germany Location within Saxony
- Coordinates: 50°53′58″N 13°26′0″E
- Country: Germany
- State: Saxony
- District: Mittelsachsen
- Disbanded: 2012
- Subdivisions: 4

Area
  - Total: 49.70 km^{2} (19.19 sq mi)
- Elevation: 458 m (1,503 ft)

Population (2010-12-31)
  - Total: 4,530
  - Density: 91.1/km^{2} (236/sq mi)
- Time zone: UTC+01:00 (CET)
  - Summer (DST): UTC+02:00 (CEST)
- Postal codes: 09627
- Dialling codes: 037325
- Vehicle registration: FG
- Website: www.bobritzsch.de

Bobritzsch is a former municipality in the district of Mittelsachsen, in Saxony, Germany. With effect from 1 January 2012, it has merged with Hilbersdorf, forming the new municipality of Bobritzsch-Hilbersdorf.

Bobritzsch is located some 28 km southwest of Dresden, 15 km west of Dippoldiswalde, 9 km northwest of Frauenstein, 10 km east of Brand-Erbisdorf and about 8 km east of Freiberg. Bobritzsch lies at the foot of the Eastern Ore Mountains. The small river Bobritzsch flows through Bobritzsch from south to north. The Ortsteil Naundorf is on the Bundesstraße 173, between Freiberg and Dresden.
