= Freiberger Mulde =

River in Germany

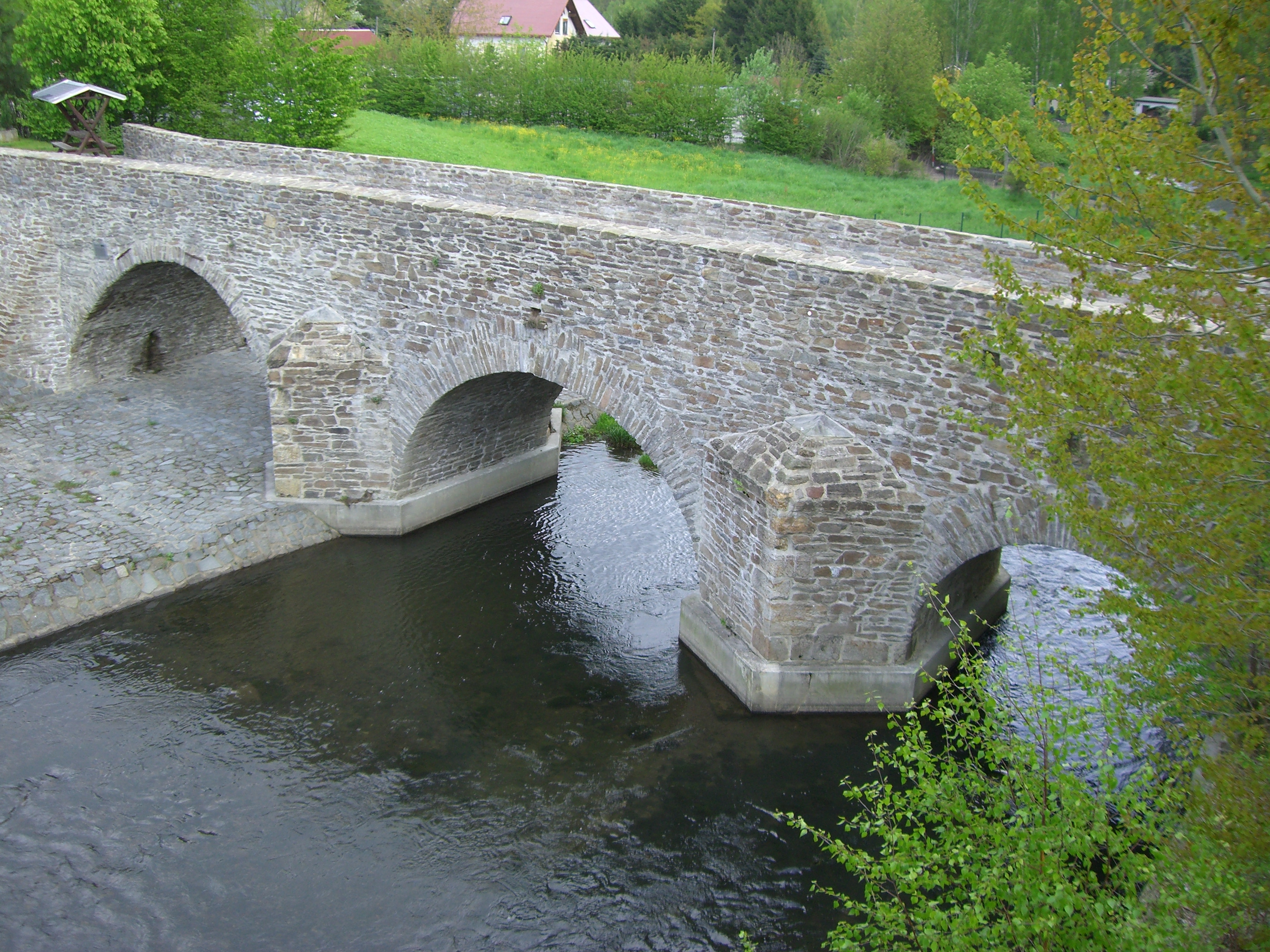
- The Freiberger Mulde and 1501 bridge in Conradsdorf (a district of Halsbrücke)

Location
- Countries: Czech Republic; Germany
- Reference no.: DE: 542

Physical characteristics
- Source
  - location: Moldava, Czech Republic
  - coordinates: 50°42′26″N 13°40′18″E
  - elevation: ca. 850 m above sea level (NHN)
- Mouth
  - location: Near Sermuth (a district of Colditz) (confluence with the Zwickauer Mulde)
  - coordinates: 51°09′37″N 12°47′53″E
  - elevation: 132.4 m above sea level (NHN)
- Length: 124 km (77 mi)
- Basin size: 2,981 km^{2} (1,151 sq mi)

Basin features
- Progression: Mulde→ Elbe→ North Sea
- Landmarks: Large towns: Freiberg, Döbeln; Small towns: Nossen, Roßwein, Leisnig, Colditz; Villages: Rechenberg-Bienenmühle
- Tributaries
  - left: Münzbach, Kleinwaltersdorfer Bach, Striegis, Zschopau
  - right: Gimmlitz, Bobritzsch

The Freiberger Mulde (also called the Östliche Mulde or Eastern Mulde; Czech: Freiberská Mulda) is the right-hand, 124-kilometre-long (77 mi) headstream of the river Mulde, whose catchment covers an area of 2,981 km^{2} (1,151 sq mi) in the Czech Republic and Germany in central Saxony. It has a volumetric flow of 35.3 m^{3}/s (1,250 cu ft/s) which is greater than that of the other headstream, the Zwickauer Mulde (or Westliche Mulde or Western Mulde) who flow is about 26.4 m^{3}/s (930 cu ft/s), which is nevertheless the longer stream.

The source of the river is in the Ore Mountains, near Moldava, in the Czech Republic. It runs northwest, crossing the border with Germany after a few kilometers, to Freiberg (hence the name), and further northwest through Nossen, Döbeln and Leisnig. A few kilometers north of Colditz, the Freiberger Mulde is joined by the Zwickauer Mulde to form the Mulde. The Mulde is a tributary of the Elbe.

== See also ==
- List of rivers of the Czech Republic
- List of rivers of Saxony
