= Bobritzsch-Hilbersdorf =

- Municipality
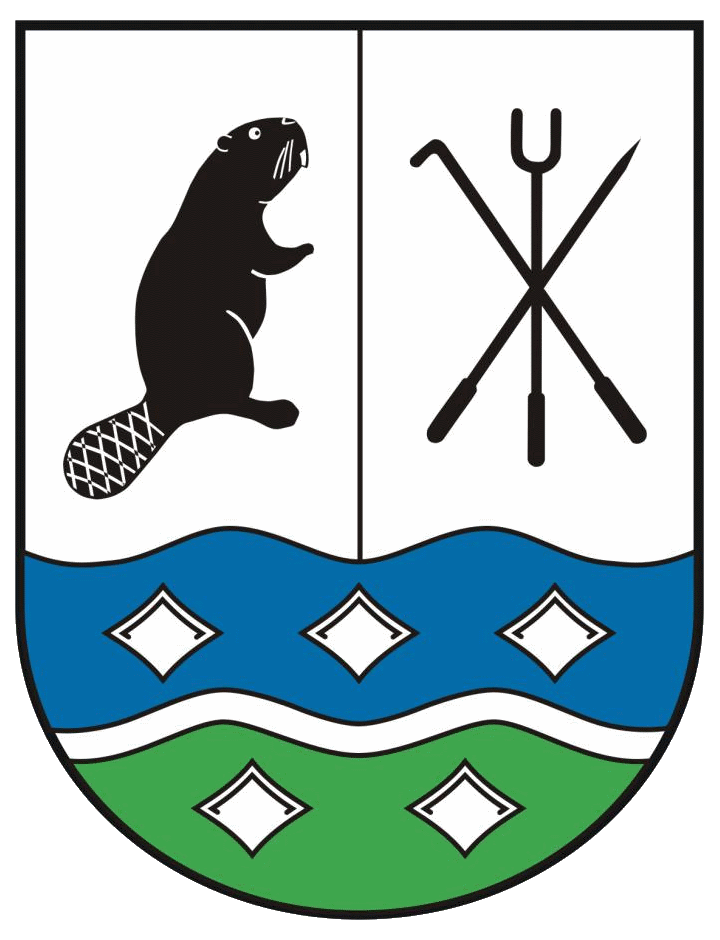
- Coat of arms

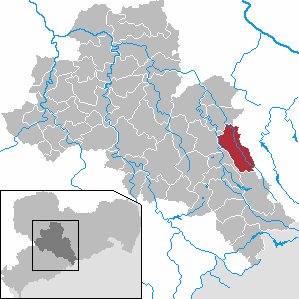
- Location of Bobritzsch-Hilbersdorf within Mittelsachsen district
- Interactive map of Bobritzsch-Hilbersdorf
- Location within Germany Location within Saxony
- Coordinates: 50°54′N 13°26′E
- Country: Germany
- State: Saxony
- District: Mittelsachsen

Government
  - Mayor (2019–26): René Straßberger (CDU)

Area
  - Total: 55.24 km^{2} (21.33 sq mi)
- Elevation: 458 m (1,503 ft)

Population (2025-12-31)
  - Total: 5,651
  - Density: 102.3/km^{2} (265.0/sq mi)
- Time zone: UTC+01:00 (CET)
  - Summer (DST): UTC+02:00 (CEST)
- Postal codes: 09627
- Dialling codes: 03731, 037325
- Vehicle registration: FG
- Website: www.bobritzsch.de

Bobritzsch-Hilbersdorf is a municipality in the Mittelsachsen district of Saxony, Germany, created with effect from 1 January 2012 by the merger of Bobritzsch and Hilbersdorf.
