= Reinsberg, Germany =

Reinsberg
- Municipality
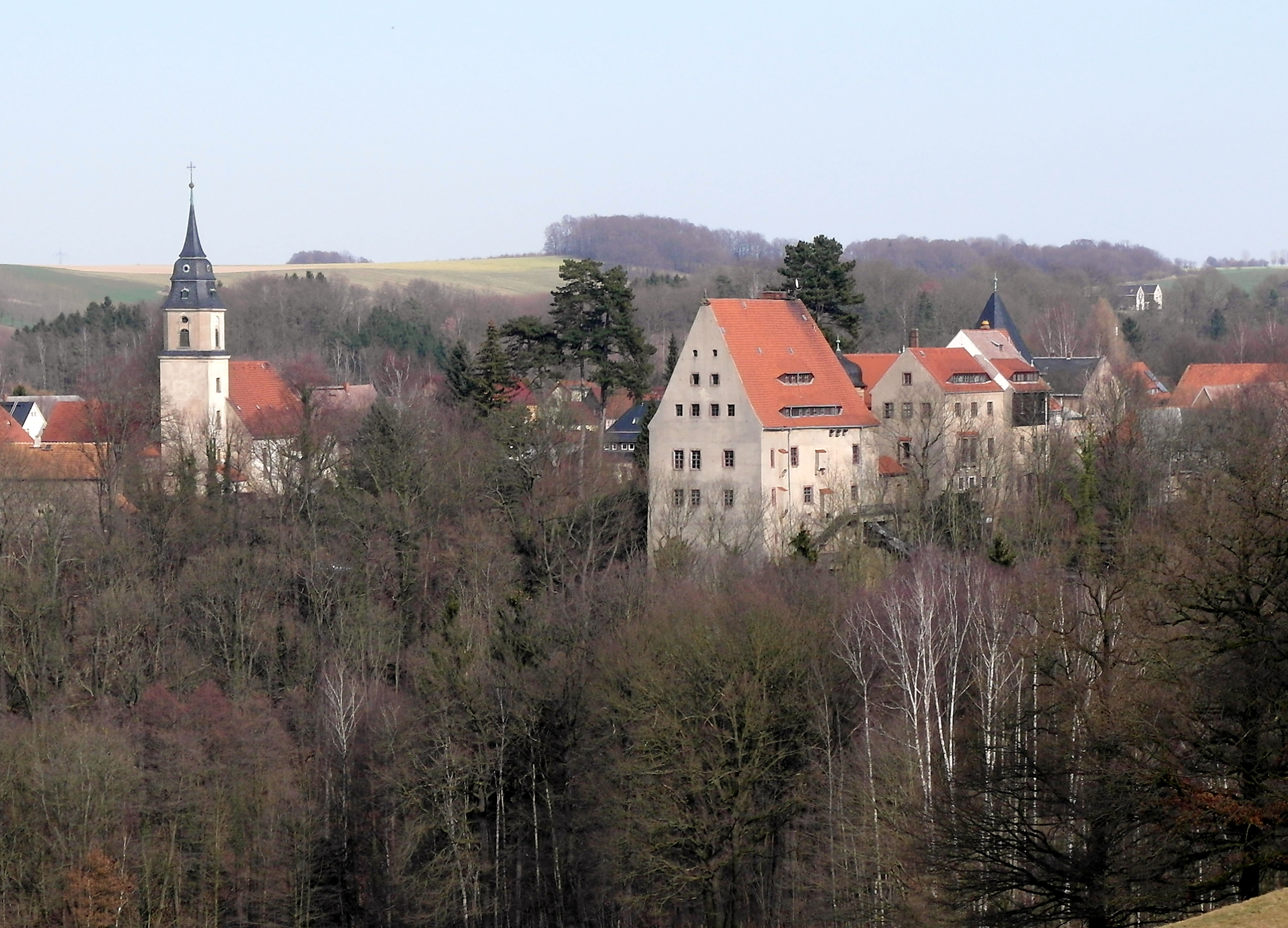
- View of the church and Reinsberg Castle

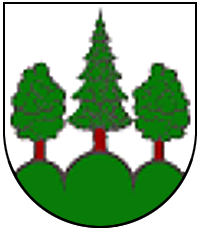
- Coat of arms

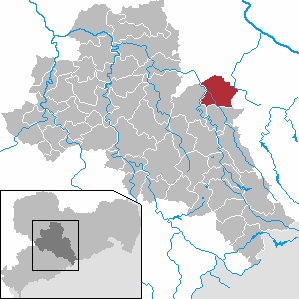
- Location of Reinsberg within Mittelsachsen district
- Interactive map of Reinsberg
- Location within Germany Location within Saxony
- Coordinates: 51°00′30″N 13°21′50″E
- Country: Germany
- State: Saxony
- District: Mittelsachsen

Government
  - Mayor (2022–29): Markus Buschkühl

Area
  - Total: 49.71 km^{2} (19.19 sq mi)
- Elevation: 335 m (1,099 ft)

Population (2025-12-31)
  - Total: 2,773
  - Density: 55.78/km^{2} (144.5/sq mi)
- Time zone: UTC+01:00 (CET)
  - Summer (DST): UTC+02:00 (CEST)
- Postal codes: 09629
- Dialling codes: 037324
- Vehicle registration: FG
- Website: www.gemeinde-reinsberg.de

Reinsberg (German pronunciation: [ˈʁaɪnsbɛʁk]) is a municipality in the district of Mittelsachsen, in Saxony, Germany.

== Notable people ==
Carl Victor Ryssel, theologian
