= Mittweida (district) =

Coordinates: 50°59′24″N 12°58′48″E

- District
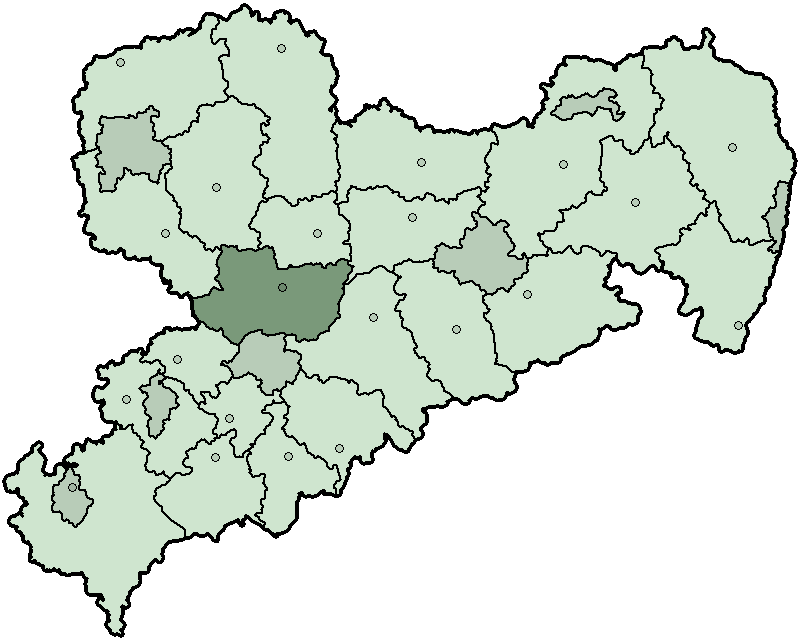
- Country: Germany
- State: Saxony
- Adm. region: Chemnitz
- Disbanded: 2008-08-01
- Capital: Mittweida

Area
  - Total: 773.18 km^{2} (298.53 sq mi)

Population (2001)
  - Total: 136,684
  - Density: 180/km^{2} (460/sq mi)
- Time zone: UTC+01:00 (CET)
  - Summer (DST): UTC+02:00 (CEST)
- Vehicle registration: MW
- Website: www.landkreis-mittweida.de

Mittweida (German pronunciation: [mɪtˈvaɪda]) is a former district in Saxony, Germany. It was bounded by (from the north and clockwise) the districts Muldentalkreis, Döbeln, Freiberg, the district-free city Chemnitz and the district Chemnitzer Land, the district Altenburger Land in Thuringia and the district Leipziger Land.

== History ==
In 1994 the district was created, when the previous districts Hainichen, Rochlitz and part the district Chemnitz were merged. In August 2008, as a part of the district reform in Saxony, the districts of Döbeln, Freiberg and Mittweida were merged into the new district Mittelsachsen.

== Geography ==
The district was located in the foothills of the Ore Mountains, only the area in the northwest around Rochlitz belongs to the Leipzig Bay. In this area is also the lowest elevation with 144 m above sea level; the highest elevation is in Hausdorf (part of Frankenberg) with 488 m. The three main rivers in the district are the Zwickauer Mulde, Chemnitz and Zschopau.

== Coat of arms ==
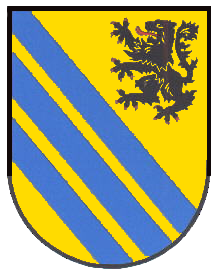
The coat of arms show the lion of Meißen in the topright corner, as most of the district area belonged to Meißen historically. The three blue bars symbolize the three main rivers of the district: Zwickauer Mulde, Chemnitz and Zschopau river.

== Towns and municipalities ==
Cities
1. Burgstädt
2. Frankenberg
3. Geringswalde
4. Hainichen
5. Lunzenau
6. Mittweida
7. Penig
8. Rochlitz
Municipalities
1. Altmittweida
2. Claußnitz
3. Erlau
4. Hartmannsdorf
5. Königsfeld
6. Königshain-Wiederau
7. Kriebstein
8. Lichtenau
Municipalities
9. Mühlau
10. Rossau
11. Seelitz
12. Striegistal
13. Taura
14. Wechselburg
15. Zettlitz
