= Freiberg (district) =

Coordinates: 50°54′36″N 13°20′24″E

- District
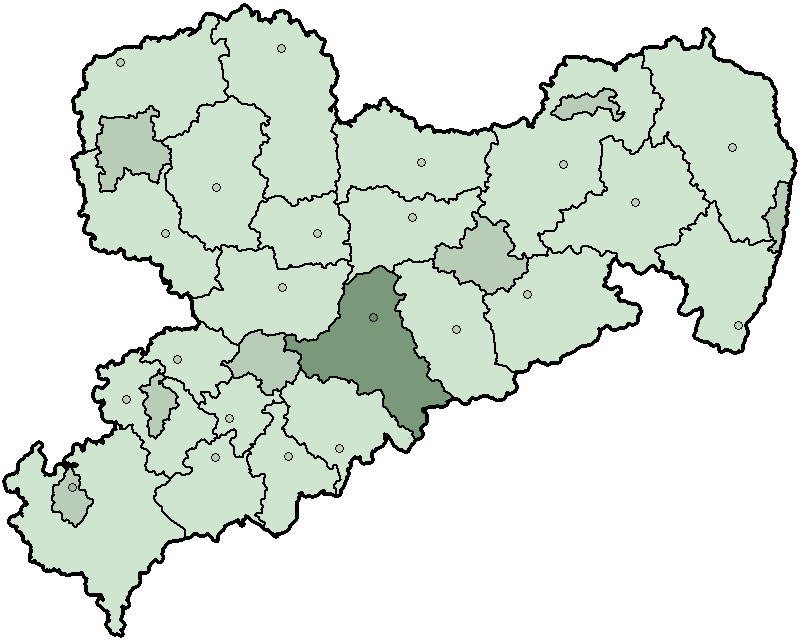
- Country: Germany
- State: Saxony
- Adm. region: Chemnitz
- Disbanded: 2008-08-01
- Capital: Freiberg

Area
  - Total: 914 km^{2} (353 sq mi)

Population (2001)
  - Total: 151,600
  - Density: 170/km^{2} (430/sq mi)
- Time zone: UTC+01:00 (CET)
  - Summer (DST): UTC+02:00 (CEST)
- Vehicle registration: FG
- Website: www.freiberg-regional.de

Freiberg is a former district in Saxony, Germany. It was bounded by (from the west and clockwise) the district of Mittlerer Erzgebirgskreis, the city of Chemnitz, the districts of Mittweida, Meißen and Weißeritzkreis, and by the Czech Republic.

== History ==
The district was established in 1994 by merging the former districts of Freiberg, Brand-Erbisdorf and Flöha. In August 2008, as a part of the district reform in Saxony, the districts of Döbeln, Freiberg and Mittweida were merged into the new district Mittelsachsen.

== Geography ==
The district was located on the northern slopes of the Ore Mountains. The largest river of the region is the Freiberger Mulde, which rises on Czech territory and from there runs northwards.

== Coat of arms ==
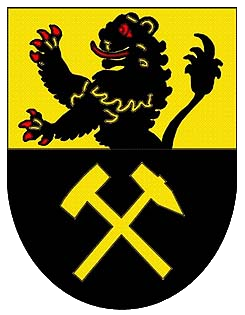
The coat of arms displays:
- the lion is the heraldic animal of Saxony
- the tools symbolise the mining tradition in the Ore Mountains

== Towns and municipalities ==
Towns
1. Augustusburg
2. Brand-Erbisdorf
3. Flöha
4. Frauenstein
5. Freiberg
6. Großschirma
7. Oederan
8. Sayda
Municipalities
1. Bobritzsch
2. Dorfchemnitz
3. Eppendorf
4. Falkenau
5. Frankenstein
6. Großhartmannsdorf
7. Halsbrücke
8. Hilbersdorf
9. Leubsdorf

10. Lichtenberg
11. Mulda
12. Neuhausen
13. Niederwiesa
14. Oberschöna
15. Rechenberg-Bienenmühle
16. Reinsberg
17. Weißenborn
