= Freiberg Mining Field =

Ore field in Saxony, eastern Germany

Coordinates: 50°55′10″N 13°21′00″E

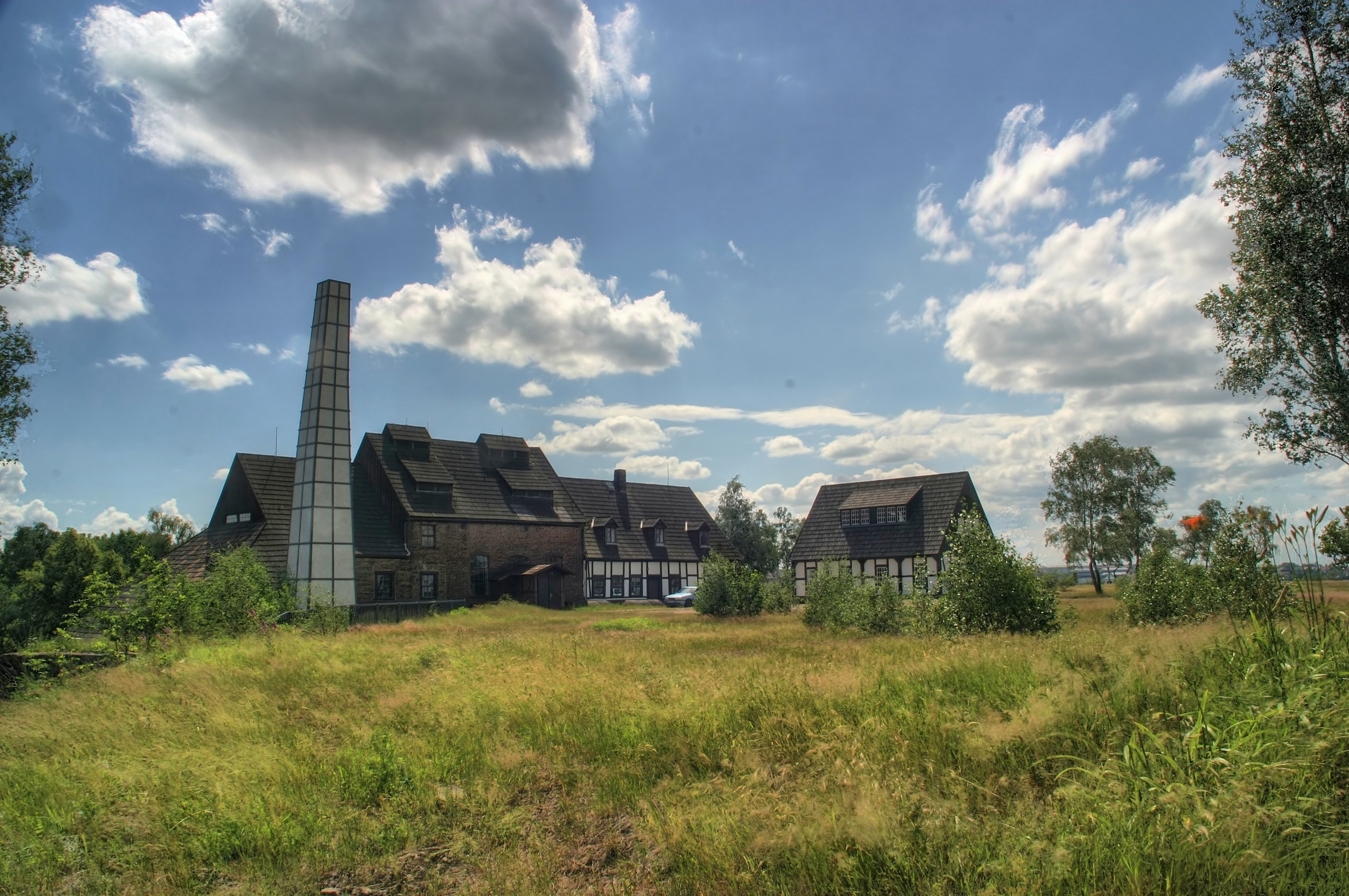
The historic Alte Elisabeth silver works in Freiberg

The Freiberg Mining Field (German: Freiberger Revier or Freiberger Bergbaurevier) is an ore field which is located on an ore deposit of precious and non-ferrous metals roughly 35 x 40 kilometres in area in the lower Eastern Ore Mountains of Saxony, Germany. Mining has been carried out here since the last third of the 12th century. Parts of this region, along with other nearby sites in the Erzgebirge/Krušnohoří Mining Region were inscribed on the UNESCO World Heritage List in 2019 because of its testimony of continuous extraction for centuries and its status as the nexus for many technological developments in ore mining.

The mining region, in the broadest sense, is centred on Freiberg, but extends beyond that town's borough into the municipalities of Halsbrücke, Hilbersdorf, Bobritzsch, Weißenborn, Oberschöna and the boroughs of Brand-Erbisdorf and Großschirma. In a narrower sense the name refers to the area covered by the Freiburg and Halsbrück mining territories (Freiberger and Halsbrücker Grubenfelder). The Brand Mining Field (Brander Revier) immediately to the south comprises just the one mining territory, the Brander Grubenfeld.

The most important mineral deposits are the ores blue lead (galena), zincblende (sphalerite), fool's gold (pyrite), arsenical iron (arsenopyrite), argentiferous grey copper ore (freibergite), dark-red silver ores (Pyrargyrite), and silver glance. The most important non-metallic materials are: quartz, calcareous spar (calcite), heavy spar (baryte) and fluorspar (fluorite).

Mining in the Freiberg area began here in the 12th century. This includes a steadily developed water supply system for the benefit of the mining industry, the Revierwasserlaufanstalt Freiberg. Within this mining region there were, historically, a large number of smelteries and, even today, there are still various active smelting works, for example in Muldenhütten.
