= Wiederau =

Wiederau may refer to:

- Wiederau (Pegau), a small village in the Leipzig district of Saxony, part of the municipality of Pegau
- Wiederau (Saxony), a small village in the Mittelsachsen district of Saxony, part of the municipality of Königshain-Wiederau
- Wiederau (Uebigau-Wahrenbrück), a village in the Elbe-Elster district of Brandenburg, part of the municipality of Uebigau-Wahrenbrück

== See also ==
- Königshain-Wiederau, a municipality in the district of Mittelsachsen, Saxony, Germany
