= Mittelsachsen =

Coordinates: 50°55′N 13°11′E

- District
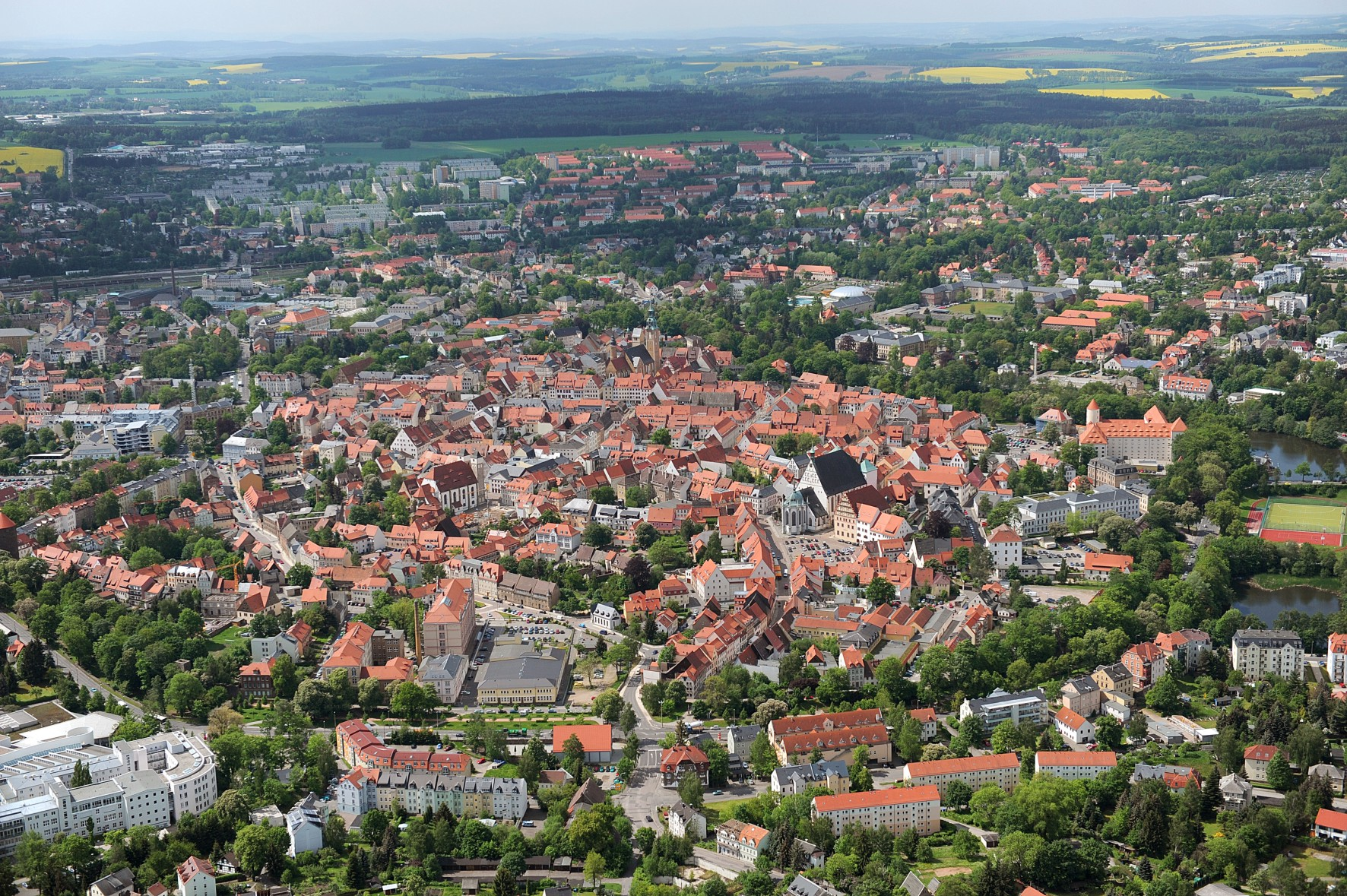
- Ariel view of Freiberg, the seat of and largest city in Mittlesachsen district

- Flag Coat of arms
- Country: Germany
- State: Saxony
- Capital: Freiberg

Government
  - District admin.: Sven Krüger (Ind.)

Area
  - Total: 2,112 km^{2} (815 sq mi)

Population (31 December 2024)
  - Total: 296,431
  - Density: 140.4/km^{2} (363.5/sq mi)
- Time zone: UTC+01:00 (CET)
  - Summer (DST): UTC+02:00 (CEST)
- Vehicle registration: FG, BED, DL, FLÖ, HC, MW, RL
- Website: www.landkreis-mittelsachsen.de

Mittelsachsen (German pronunciation: [ˈmɪtl̩ˌzaksn̩], lit. 'Central Saxony') is a district (Kreis) in the Free State of Saxony, Germany.

== History ==
The district was established by merging the former districts of Döbeln, Freiberg and Mittweida as part of the district reform of August 2008.

== Geography ==
The district stretches from the Ore Mountains on the Czech Republic–Germany border to the plains between Leipzig and Dresden. The district borders (from the west and clockwise) the state Thuringia, the districts of Leipzig, Nordsachsen, Meißen, Sächsische Schweiz-Osterzgebirge, the Czech Republic, Erzgebirgskreis, the urban district Chemnitz, and the district of Zwickau.

The geography of the district varies considerably, stretching from the northern part which almost reaches the North German Plain, to the southern part in the Ore Mountains region. The lowest point is at 140 metres above sea level, in the valley of the Freiberger Mulde near Leisnig. The highest point is 855 metres above sea level on the Czech border.

The most important rivers in Mittelsachsen are the Zwickauer and Freiberger Mulde, and the Zschopau river. Other notable rivers include Bobritzsch, Striegis, Gimmlitz and Flöha. The district also contains the reservoirs Kriebstein, Lichtenberg and Rauschenbach. Part of the Erzgebirge/Vogtland national park is located in the southern part of Mittelsachsen.

== Politics ==
=== Coat of arms ===
In 2008, upon the creation of the Mittelsachsen district, the heraldic society "Schwarzer Löwe" in Leipzig, in collaboration with graphics studio Eberhard Heinicker, put forward several proposals for a new coat of arms. Six proposals in total were put to the district council. The district council eventually chose the current design on 10 June 2009. The coat of arms shows the lion of Meißen, representing the Margravate of Meissen, and a hammer and pick representing the local mining heritage. The blue waves are derived from the coat of arms of Mittweida, and the three black lozenges from the former arms of Döbeln.

=== District council ===
The elections for the Mittelsachsen district happened on 7 June 2015. The former mayor of Mittweida, Matthias Damm (CDU), won with an absolute majority (65.74% of votes).

== Transport ==
=== Road ===
The district is served by three motorways, the A4 being the main east–west route, with the A14 branching off to the north-west. In the far west, the A72 runs through the district. The district is also served by the B7, B101, B107, B169, B171, B173, B175, B176, and B180 federal roads and major state roads.

=== Rail ===
Four main railway lines run through the district: Dresden-Freiberg-Chemnitz-Werdau, Riesa-Döbeln-Chemnitz, Neukieritzsch-Chemnitz and Borsdorf-Döbeln-Coswig.

Long-distance passenger trains do not run through the district and can only be reached by changing trains at Dresden Hbf, Riesa, Elsterwerda or Leipzig Hbf. The interregional Dresden-Nuremberg connection via Freiberg and Flöha, which existed until 2014 and was most recently marketed as the Franken-Sachsen-Express, was interrupted at Hof in order to be able to run between Dresden, Freiberg, Flöha and Hof with electric traction and barrier-free vehicles in the future. In addition to the mainline stations mentioned above, regional centres such as Chemnitz, Zwickau, Plauen and Hof, but also regional destinations such as Olbernhau, Annaberg-Buchholz and Grimma can be reached by local trains. The district town of Freiberg is also integrated into the Dresden S-Bahn network. Burgstädt, Mittweida, Frankenberg and Hainichen are integrated into the Chemnitz model and served by the City-Bahn Chemnitz.

The once dense rail network had already been severely thinned out by Deutsche Bahn before the district reform in 2008. Entire junctions such as Rochlitz with the Glauchau-Rochlitz-Wurzen, Rochlitz-Penig and Waldheim-Rochlitz lines were closed. Other junctions such as Nossen and Freiberg lost considerable importance. Today, the Nossen-Holzhau, Berthelsdorf-Brand-Erbisdorf, Flöha-Marienberg, Pockau-Lengefeld-Neuhausen, Hainichen-Niederwiesa and Hartmannsdorf-Wittgensdorf branch lines in the Ore Mountains are still in operation, although not all sections have regular passenger services. Some of these lines are operated by non-federal railway infrastructure companies.

The entire district belongs to the Verkehrsverbund Mittelsachsen.

=== Flight ===
The closest airports for commercial travel are Leipzig–Altenburg Airport (15 km), Dresden Airport (28 km), and Leipzig/Halle Airport (58 km). However, there is an airfield at Langhennersdorf which is used for recreational flight.

== Academic Education ==
The Landkreis is home to two universities, the TU Bergakademie in Freiberg (focused on Geo-science) and the University of Applied Sciences in Mittweida (MINT, Social, Media).

== Towns and municipalities ==
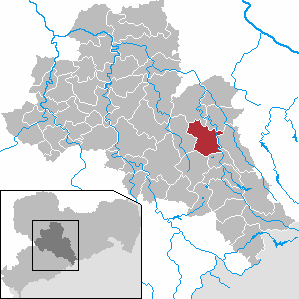
Clickable map of towns and municipalities in the district

Towns
Municipalities
1. Augustusburg
2. Brand-Erbisdorf
3. Burgstädt
4. Döbeln
5. Flöha
6. Frankenberg
7. Frauenstein
8. Freiberg
9. Geringswalde
10. Großschirma
11. Hainichen
12. Hartha
13. Leisnig
14. Lunzenau
15. Mittweida
16. Oederan
17. Penig
18. Rochlitz
19. Roßwein
20. Sayda
21. Waldheim
1. Altmittweida
2. Bobritzsch-Hilbersdorf
3. Claußnitz
4. Dorfchemnitz
5. Eppendorf
6. Erlau
7. Großhartmannsdorf
8. Großweitzschen
9. Halsbrücke
10. Hartmannsdorf
11. Jahnatal
12. Königsfeld
13. Königshain-Wiederau
14. Kriebstein
15. Leubsdorf
16. Lichtenau
17. Lichtenberg
18. Mühlau
19. Mulda
20. Neuhausen
21. Niederwiesa
22. Oberschöna
23. Rechenberg-Bienenmühle
24. Reinsberg
25. Rossau
26. Seelitz
27. Striegistal
28. Taura
29. Wechselburg
30. Weißenborn
31. Zettlitz
