= Döbeln (district) =

Coordinates: 51°07′12″N 13°06′36″E

- District
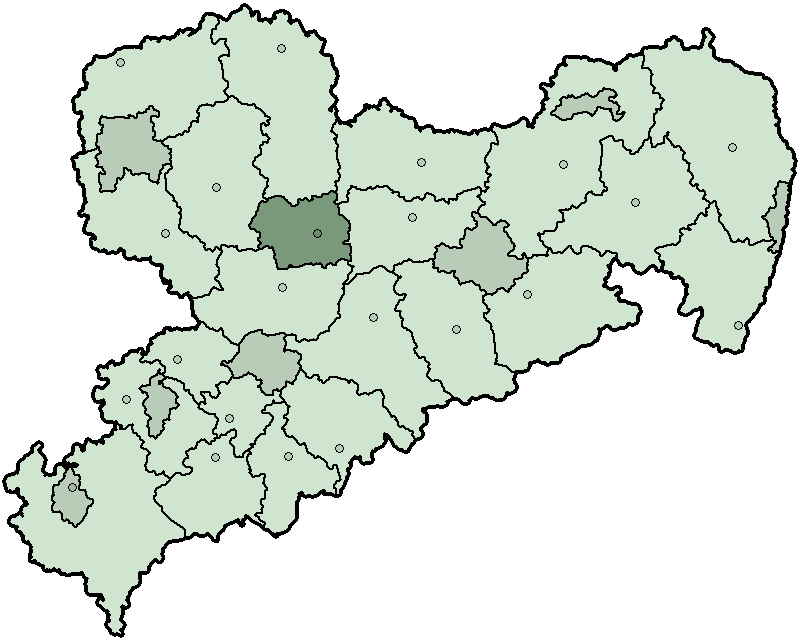
- Country: Germany
- State: Saxony
- Adm. region: Leipzig
- Disbanded: 2008-07-31
- Capital: Döbeln

Area
  - Total: 424 km^{2} (164 sq mi)

Population (2007)
  - Total: 70,533
  - Density: 166/km^{2} (431/sq mi)
- Time zone: UTC+01:00 (CET)
  - Summer (DST): UTC+02:00 (CEST)
- Vehicle registration: DL

Döbeln is a former district in Saxony, Germany. It was bounded by (from the north and clockwise) the districts of Torgau-Oschatz, Riesa-Großenhain, Meißen, Mittweida and Muldentalkreis.

== History ==
The region was originally populated by Sorbic peoples. In the early Middle Ages, the Daleminzian people settled along this section of the Mulde River. They were driven away by Germans after the Battle of Jahna in 928.

The present borders of the district were established in 1952, when the government of East Germany formed the new districts. Döbeln was one of the few districts which had not been changed directly after the German reunification. In August 2008, as a part of the district reform in Saxony, the districts of Döbeln, Freiberg and Mittweida were merged into the new district Mittelsachsen.

== Geography ==
The district was located on the banks of the Freiberger Mulde in the triangle between the cities of Dresden, Leipzig and Chemnitz.

== Coat of arms ==
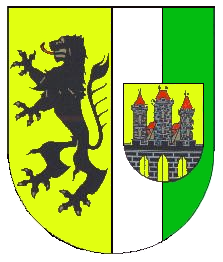
The lion is the heraldic animal of Saxony. Green and white are the colours of the flag of Saxony. The shield on the right side displays the arms of the city of Döbeln.

== Towns and municipalities ==
Towns
1. Döbeln
2. Hartha
3. Leisnig
4. Roßwein
5. Waldheim
Municipalities
1. Bockelwitz
2. Ebersbach
3. Großweitzschen
4. Mochau
5. Niederstriegis
6. Ostrau
7. Ziegra-Knobelsdorf
8. Zschaitz-Ottewig
