= Mittweida =

- Town
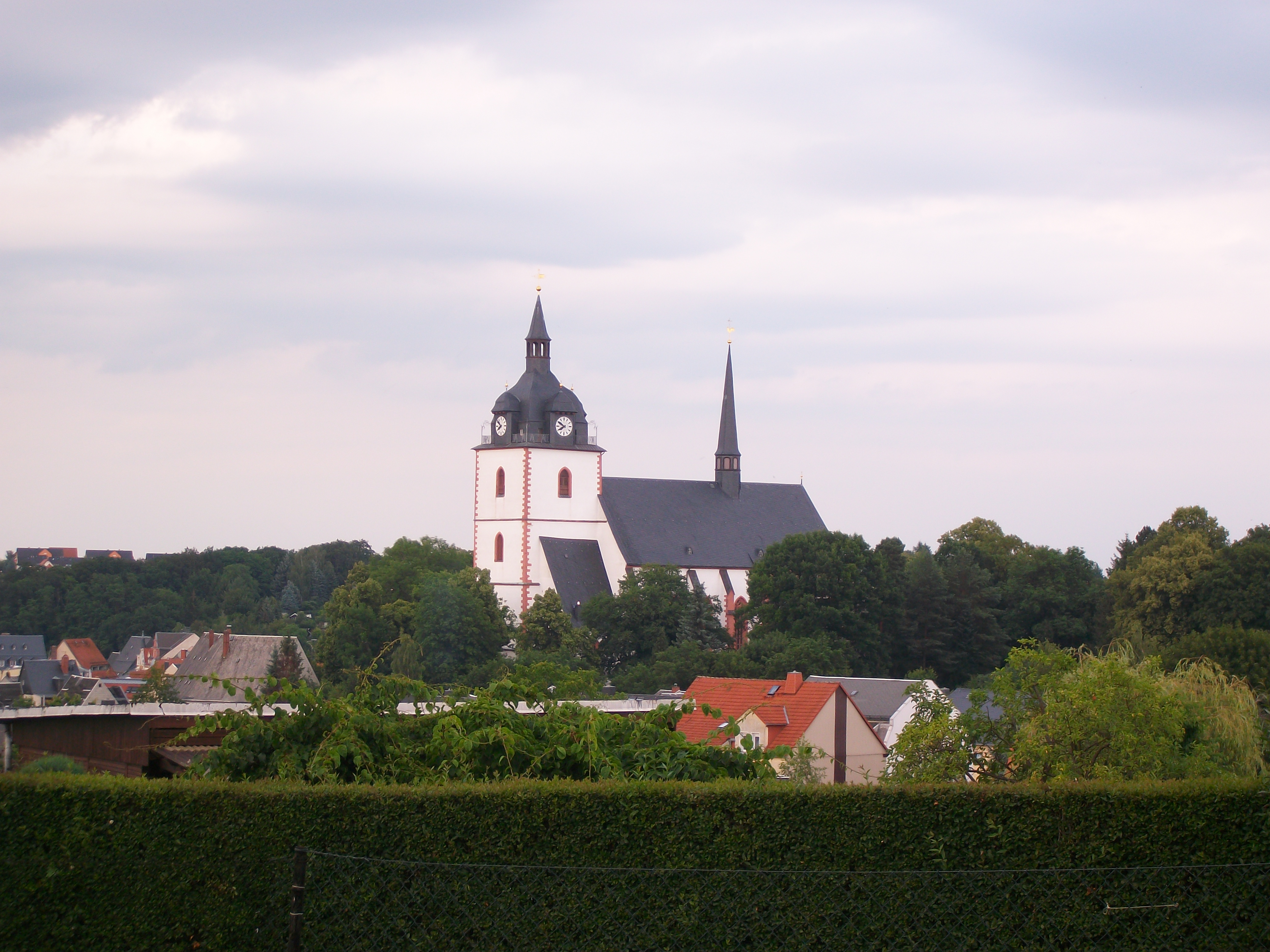
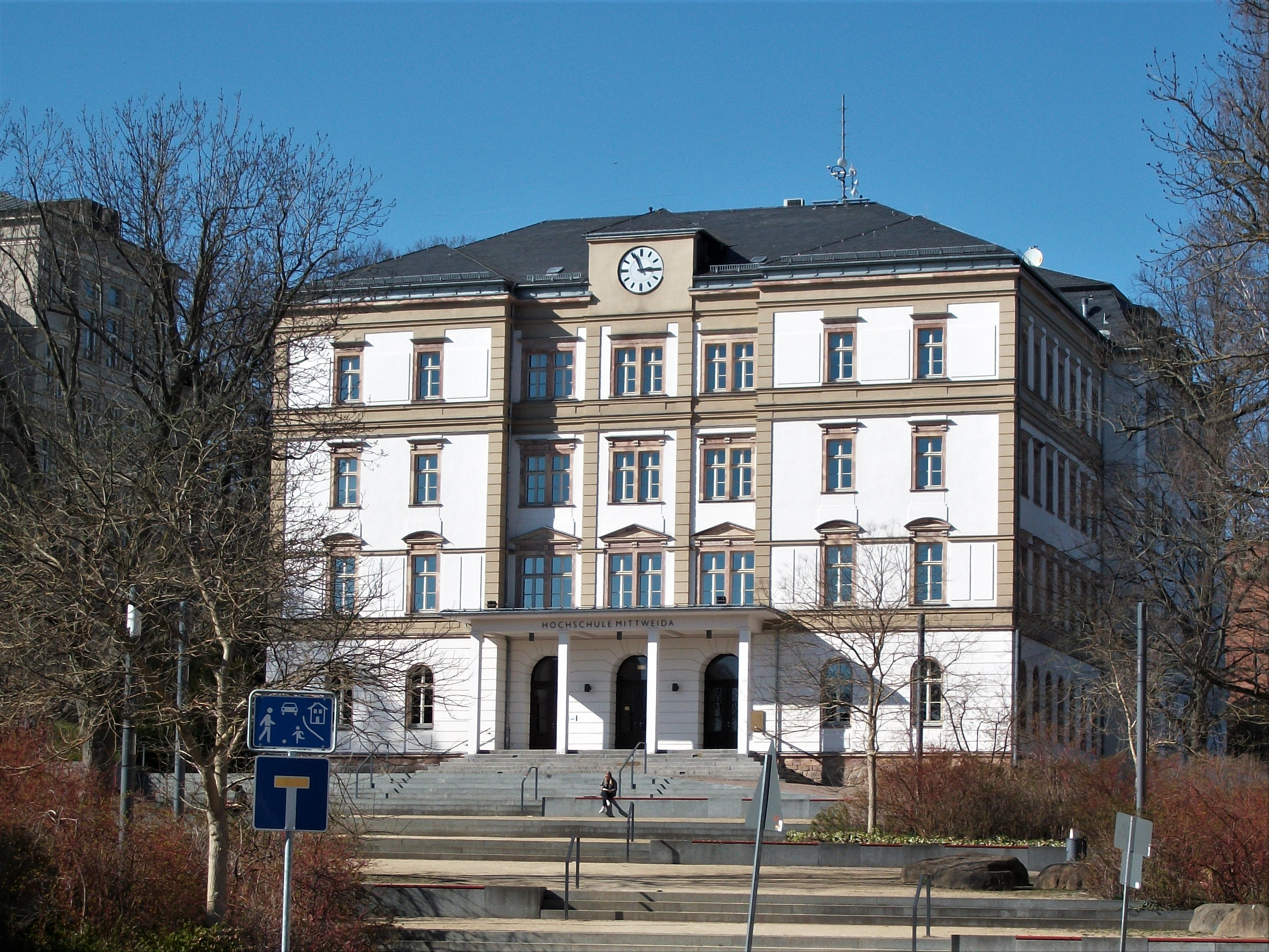
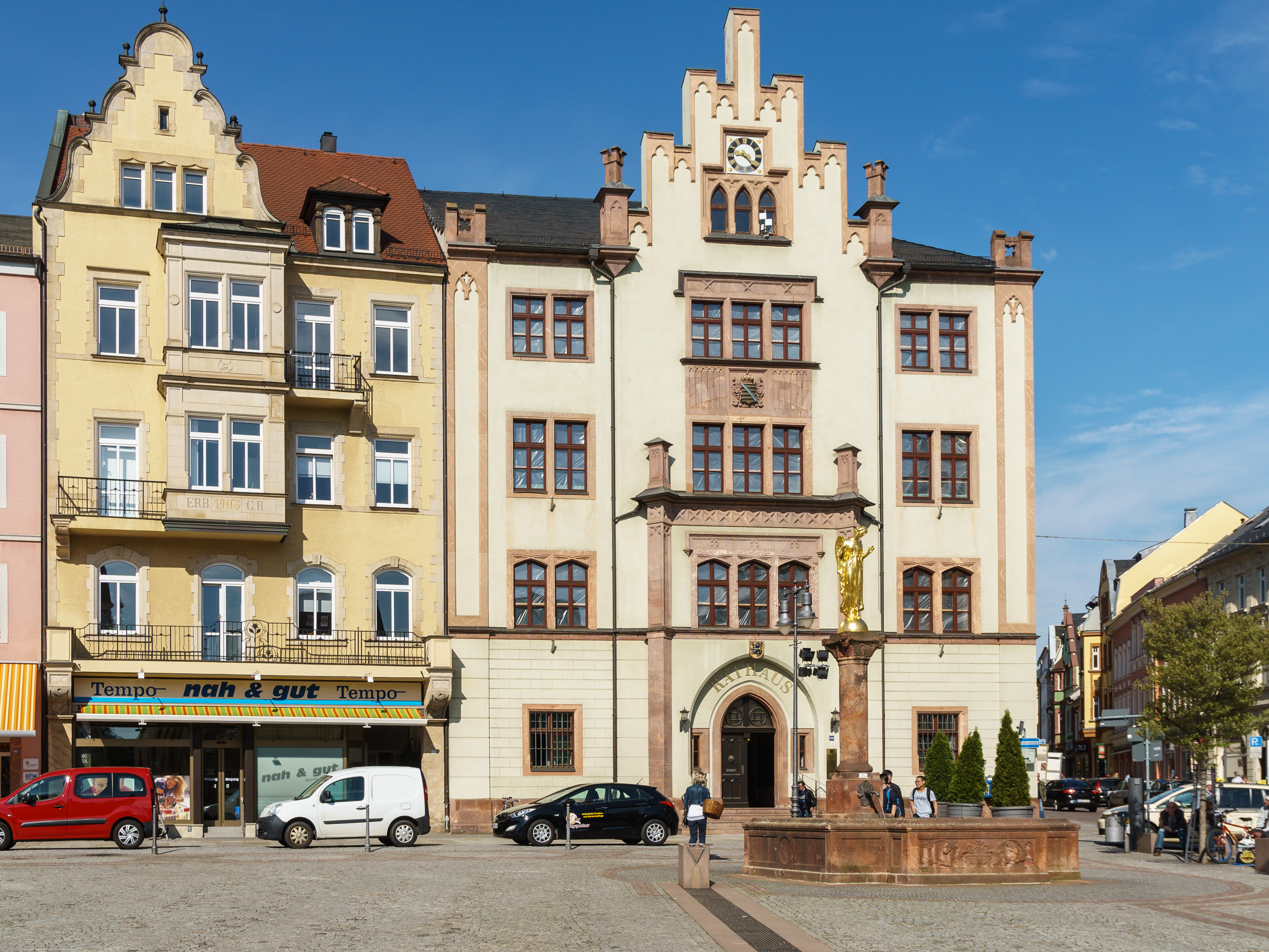
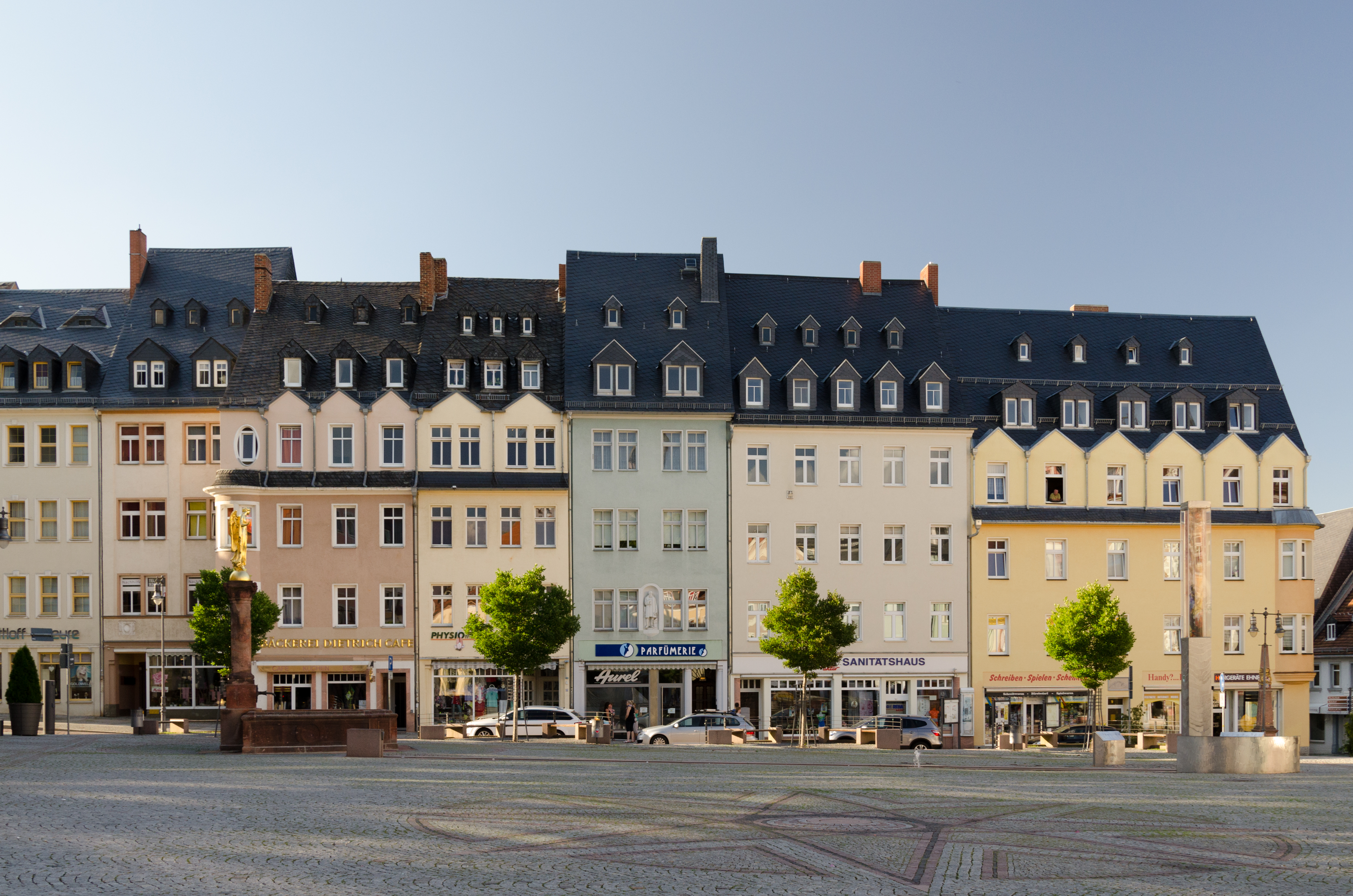
- St. Marien church Mittweida Hochschule Mittweida Townhall Houses on the market square

- Coat of arms

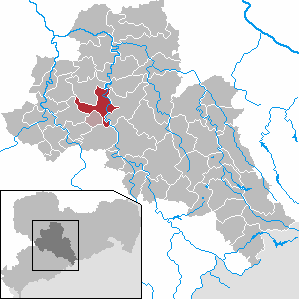
- Location of Mittweida within Mittelsachsen district
- Interactive map of Mittweida
- Location within Germany Location within Saxony
- Coordinates: 50°59′8″N 12°58′52″E
- Country: Germany
- State: Saxony
- District: Mittelsachsen

Government
  - Mayor (2022–29): Ralf Schreiber (CDU)

Area
  - Total: 41.26 km^{2} (15.93 sq mi)
- Elevation: 288 m (945 ft)

Population (2025-12-31)
  - Total: 13,730
  - Density: 332.8/km^{2} (861.9/sq mi)
- Time zone: UTC+01:00 (CET)
  - Summer (DST): UTC+02:00 (CEST)
- Postal codes: 09648
- Dialling codes: 03727
- Vehicle registration: FG, BED, DL, FLÖ, HC, MW, RL
- Website: www.mittweida.de

Mittweida (German: [mɪtˈvaɪda]) is a town in Saxony, Germany, in the Mittelsachsen district.

== Geography ==
Mittweida is situated on the river Zschopau, 18 km north of Chemnitz, and 54 km west of Dresden. Embedded within the steep hills and valleys of the river and two smaller creeks, the town is green and picturesque.

Mittweida has a station on the Riesa–Chemnitz railway. A branch line, closed in 1997, served the industries in nearby Dreiwerden and Ringethal. Major roads are the state roads S200, S201, and S247, connecting the town with various federal roads and the motorway A4 which passes south-east of Mittweida.

== History ==
The town was first mentioned in 1209. In 1286 it was known as civitas and oppidum. Weaving of wool and linen were major occupations of the inhabitants in the Middle Ages, and after a spinning mill was founded in 1816, the town grew into one of the major textile-producing centers in Saxony of the 20th century. Mittweida was already a sizeable town in the mid-16th century, and despite having more inhabitants than Rochlitz, it had remained part of Amt and Amtshauptmannschaft Rochlitz for many years. In 1924 it became a separate urban district. During World War II, a subcamp of Flossenbürg concentration camp was located in Mittweida. In 1946 the town was reintegrated into Landkreis Rochlitz and was transferred to Kreis Hainichen in 1952. Landkreis Mittweida was formed from the districts Rochlitz and Hainichen in 1994, it was integrated into Landkreis Mittelsachsen in 2008.

== Buildings and culture ==
Of interest are the Gothic church from the 15/16th century, the old town, the historic and technical museums and the nearby Kriebstein castle.

Mittweida is home to a University of Applied Sciences with about 5000 students. Founded in the late 19th century, it is known far beyond the Saxon borders. Among its students were August Horch, Walter Bruch, Jørgen Skafte Rasmussen, and Gerhard Neumann.

== Mayors ==
- 1960–1972 Günter Kluge (SED)
- 1972–1988 Max Gerhard Imhof (SED)
- 1988–1989 Hans Günter Beulich (SED)
- 1990 Helene Gerda Wunderlich (SED)
- 1990–2001 Bruno Rudolf Kny (CDU)
- 2001–2015 Matthias Damm (CDU)
- since 2015 Ralf Schreiber

== Notable people ==
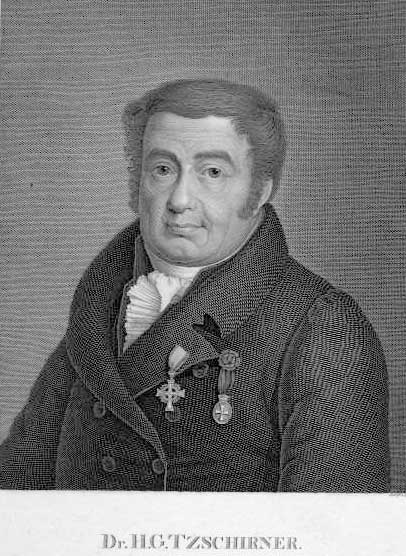
Heinrich Gottlieb Tschirner

- Manfred Halpern (1924–2001), political scientist
- Heinrich Gottlieb Tzschirner (1778–1828), Protestant theologian
- Johannes Schilling (1828–1910), sculptor
- Rudolf Hasse (1906–1942), racing driver
- Paul Dittel (1907-1976?), Head of Amt VII of the Reichsicherheitshauptamt and SS Obersturmburführer
- Erich Loest (1926–2013), writer
- Peter Moreth (born 1941), politician (LDPD)
- Andreas Klöden (born 1975), cyclist
- Antje Traue (born 1981), actress

== Twin towns – sister cities ==
Mittweida is twinned with:

- Bornheim, Germany
- Česká Lípa, Czech Republic
- Gabrovo, Bulgaria
- Viersen, Germany
