= Lunzenau =

- Town
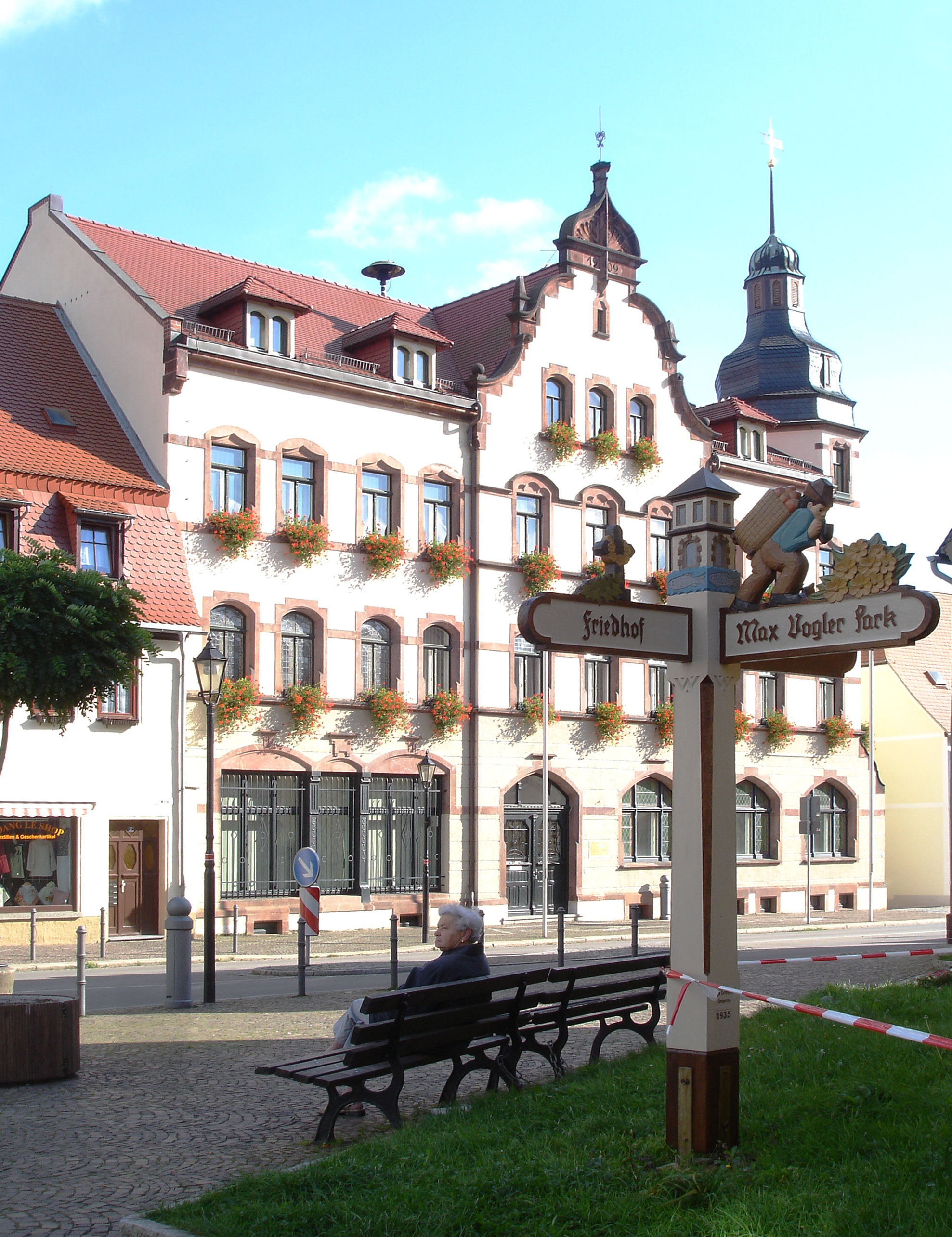
- Town hall

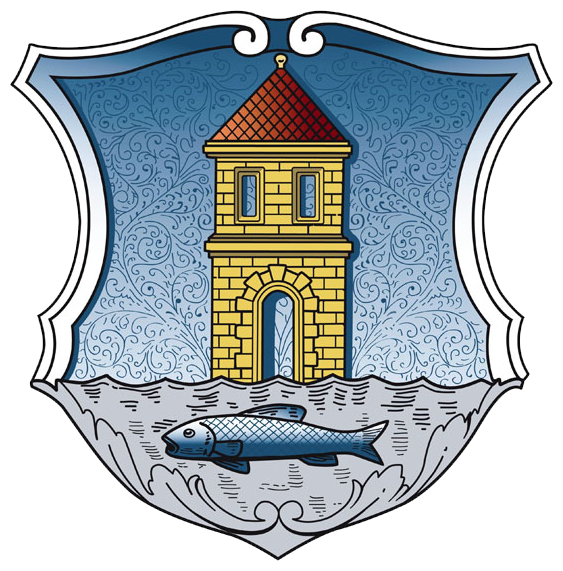
- Coat of arms

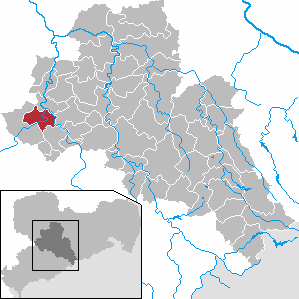
- Location of Lunzenau within Mittelsachsen district
- Interactive map of Lunzenau
- Location within Germany Location within Saxony
- Coordinates: 50°57′47″N 12°45′11″E
- Country: Germany
- State: Saxony
- District: Mittelsachsen

Government
  - Mayor (2022–29): Ronny Hofmann (CDU)

Area
  - Total: 28.33 km^{2} (10.94 sq mi)
- Elevation: 225 m (738 ft)

Population (2025-12-31)
  - Total: 3,851
  - Density: 135.9/km^{2} (352.1/sq mi)
- Time zone: UTC+01:00 (CET)
  - Summer (DST): UTC+02:00 (CEST)
- Postal codes: 09328
- Dialling codes: 037383
- Vehicle registration: FG
- Website: www.lunzenau.de

Lunzenau (German pronunciation: [ˈlʊntsənaʊ]) is a town in the district of Mittelsachsen, in Saxony, Germany. It is situated on the river Zwickauer Mulde, 16 km west of Mittweida, and 18 km northwest of Chemnitz.
