= Leubsdorf, Saxony =

Leubsdorf
- Municipality
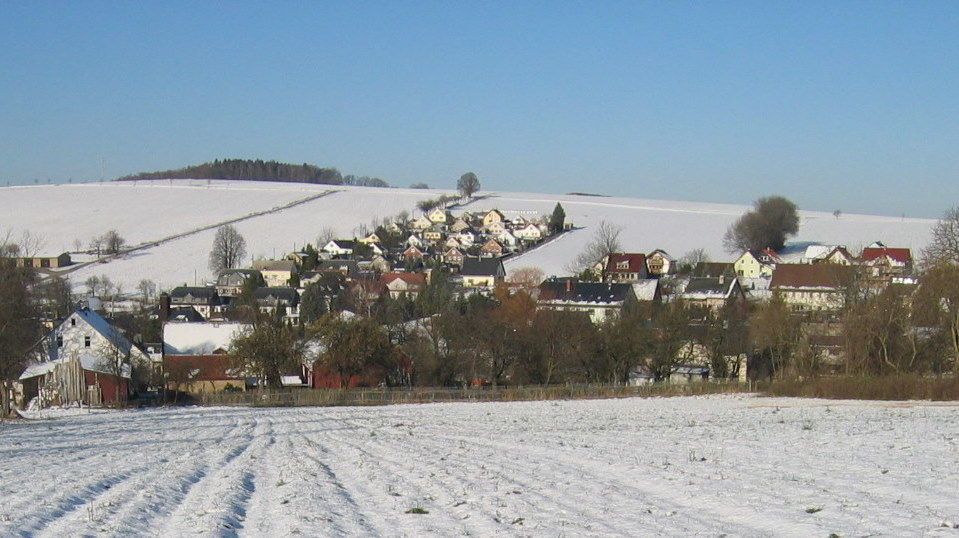
- Leubsdorf in winter

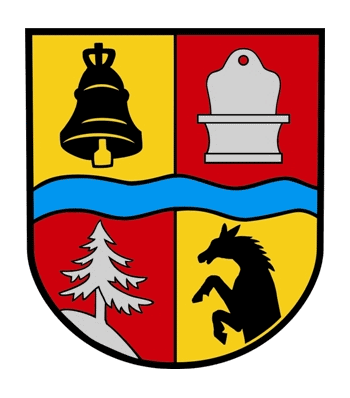
- Coat of arms

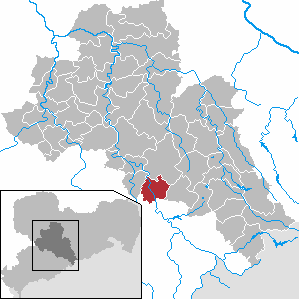
- Location of Leubsdorf within Mittelsachsen district
- Interactive map of Leubsdorf
- Location within Germany Location within Saxony
- Coordinates: 50°48′N 13°10′E
- Country: Germany
- State: Saxony
- District: Mittelsachsen
- Subdivisions: 4

Government
  - Mayor (2022–29): Dirk Fröhlich (CDU)

Area
  - Total: 34.47 km^{2} (13.31 sq mi)
- Elevation: 396 m (1,299 ft)

Population (2025-12-31)
  - Total: 3,163
  - Density: 91.76/km^{2} (237.7/sq mi)
- Time zone: UTC+01:00 (CET)
  - Summer (DST): UTC+02:00 (CEST)
- Postal codes: 09573
- Dialling codes: 037291
- Vehicle registration: FG
- Website: www.leubsdorf-sachsen.de

Leubsdorf (German pronunciation: [ˈlɔʏpsdɔʁf]) is a municipality in the district of Mittelsachsen, in Saxony, Germany.
