= Lichtenau, Saxony =

Lichtenau
- Municipality
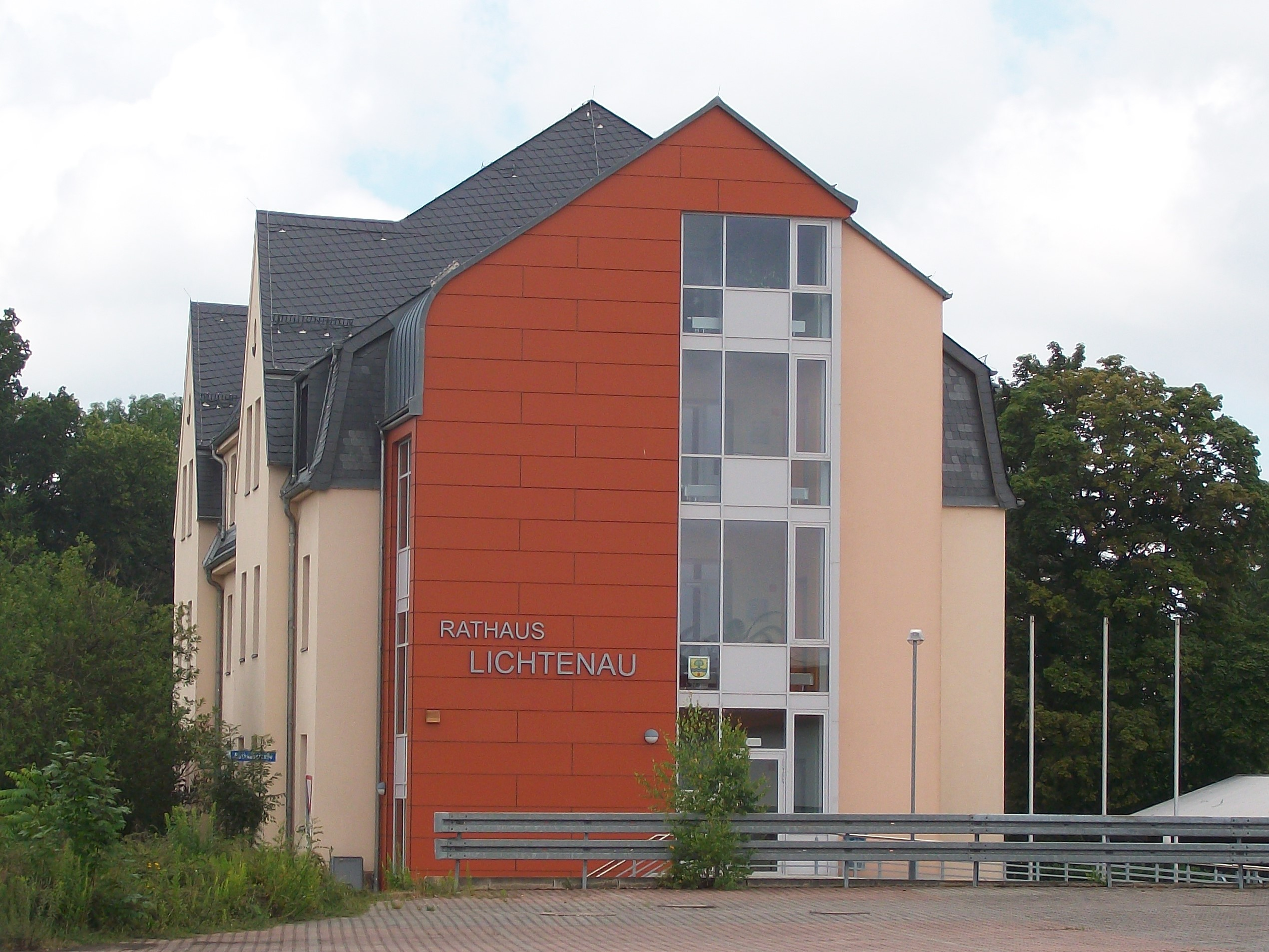
- Town hall

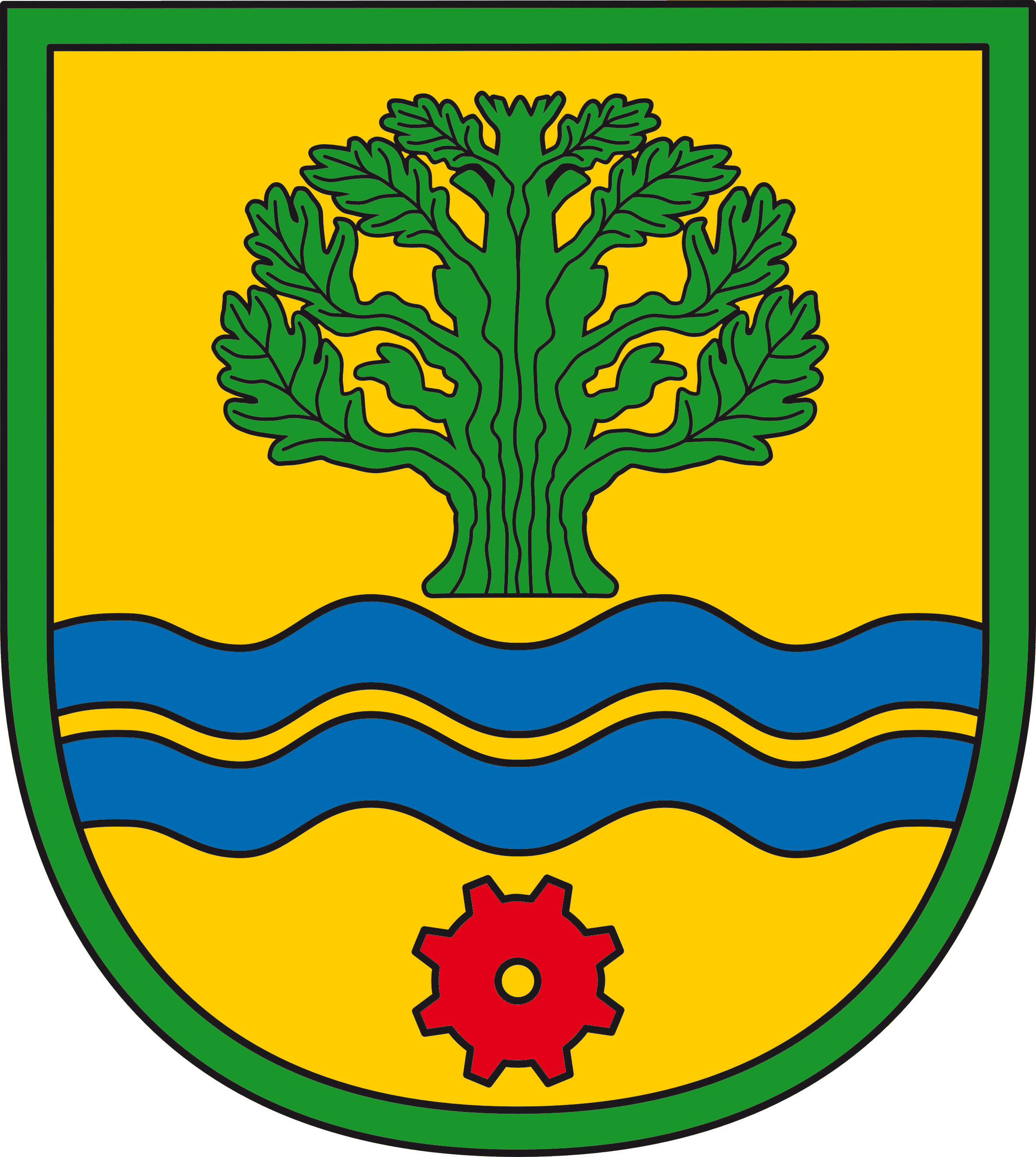
- Coat of arms

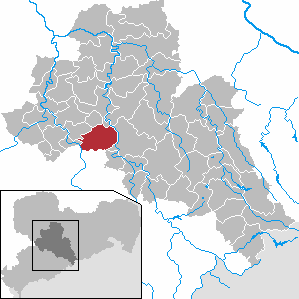
- Location of Lichtenau within Mittelsachsen district
- Interactive map of Lichtenau
- Location within Germany Location within Saxony
- Coordinates: 50°54′30″N 12°59′30″E
- Country: Germany
- State: Saxony
- District: Mittelsachsen
- Subdivisions: 8

Government
  - Mayor (2021–28): Andreas Graf

Area
  - Total: 49.15 km^{2} (18.98 sq mi)
- Elevation: 349 m (1,145 ft)

Population (2025-12-31)
  - Total: 6,854
  - Density: 139.5/km^{2} (361.2/sq mi)
- Time zone: UTC+01:00 (CET)
  - Summer (DST): UTC+02:00 (CEST)
- Postal codes: 09244
- Dialling codes: 037208
- Vehicle registration: FG
- Website: www.gemeinde-lichtenau.de

Lichtenau (German pronunciation: [ˈlɪçtənaʊ]) is a municipality in the district of Mittelsachsen, in Saxony, Germany.
