= Sayda, Saxony =

- Town
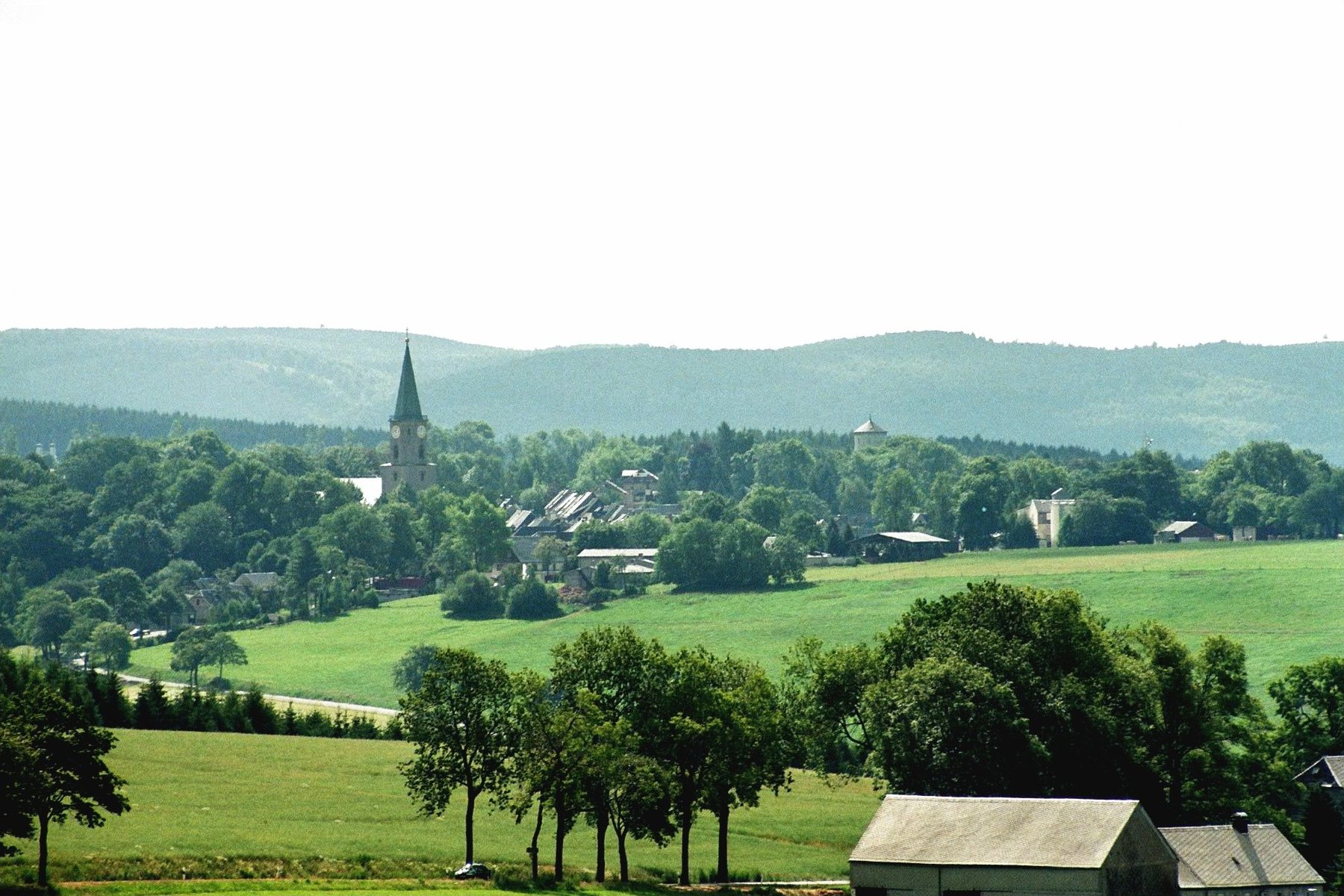
- Sayda

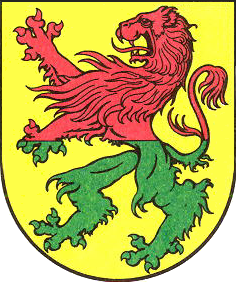
- Coat of arms

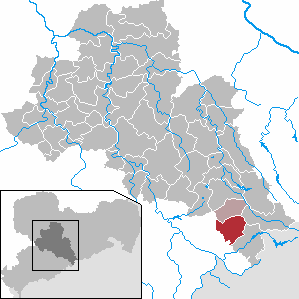
- Location of Sayda, Saxony within Mittelsachsen district
- Interactive map of Sayda, Saxony
- Location within Germany Location within Saxony
- Coordinates: 50°43′N 13°25′E
- Country: Germany
- State: Saxony
- District: Mittelsachsen

Government
  - Mayor (2022–29): Stefan Wanke

Area
  - Total: 35.3 km^{2} (13.6 sq mi)
- Elevation: 680 m (2,230 ft)

Population (2025-12-31)
  - Total: 1,642
  - Density: 46.5/km^{2} (120/sq mi)
- Time zone: UTC+01:00 (CET)
  - Summer (DST): UTC+02:00 (CEST)
- Postal codes: 09619
- Dialling codes: 037365
- Vehicle registration: FG
- Website: www.sayda.eu

Sayda (German pronunciation: [ˈzaɪda]) is a town in the district of Mittelsachsen, in Saxony, Germany. It is situated 24 km south of Freiberg, and 28 km north of Chomutov.

== Twin towns – sister cities ==
Sayda is twinned with:

- Sogliano al Rubicone, Italy
- Meziboří, Czech Republic
