= Mulda, Germany =

Mulda
- Municipality
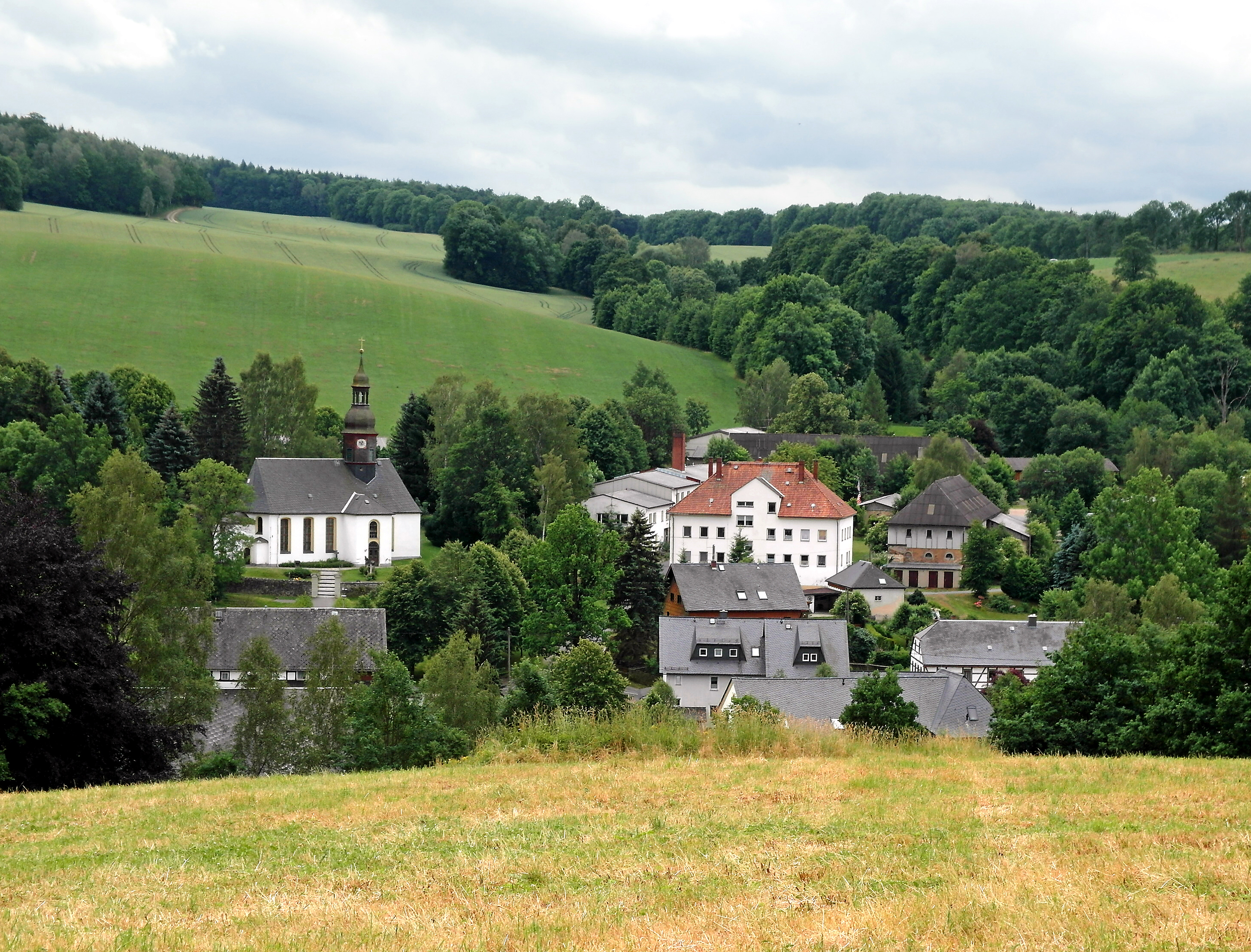
- View of the town centre

- Coat of arms

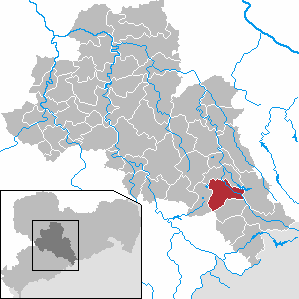
- Location of Mulda within Mittelsachsen district
- Interactive map of Mulda
- Location within Germany Location within Saxony
- Coordinates: 50°48′30″N 13°24′39″E
- Country: Germany
- State: Saxony
- District: Mittelsachsen

Government
  - Mayor (2021–28): Michael Wiezorek

Area
  - Total: 43.14 km^{2} (16.66 sq mi)
- Elevation: 505 m (1,657 ft)

Population (2025-12-31)
  - Total: 2,302
  - Density: 53.36/km^{2} (138.2/sq mi)
- Time zone: UTC+01:00 (CET)
  - Summer (DST): UTC+02:00 (CEST)
- Postal codes: 09619
- Dialling codes: 037320
- Vehicle registration: FG

Mulda (German pronunciation: [ˈmʊlda]) is a municipality in the district of Mittelsachsen, in Saxony, Germany.
