= Niederwiesa =

- Municipality
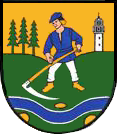
- Coat of arms

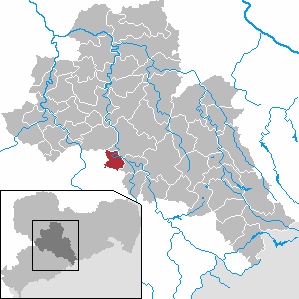
- Location of Niederwiesa within Mittelsachsen district
- Interactive map of Niederwiesa
- Location within Germany Location within Saxony
- Coordinates: 50°51′48″N 13°1′21″E
- Country: Germany
- State: Saxony
- District: Mittelsachsen

Government
  - Mayor (2019–26): Raik Schubert

Area
  - Total: 16.17 km^{2} (6.24 sq mi)
- Elevation: 300 m (980 ft)

Population (2025-12-31)
  - Total: 4,693
  - Density: 290.2/km^{2} (751.7/sq mi)
- Time zone: UTC+01:00 (CET)
  - Summer (DST): UTC+02:00 (CEST)
- Postal codes: 09577
- Dialling codes: 03726, 037206
- Vehicle registration: FG
- Website: www.gemeinde-niederwiesa.de

Niederwiesa is a municipality in the district of Mittelsachsen, in Saxony, Germany.

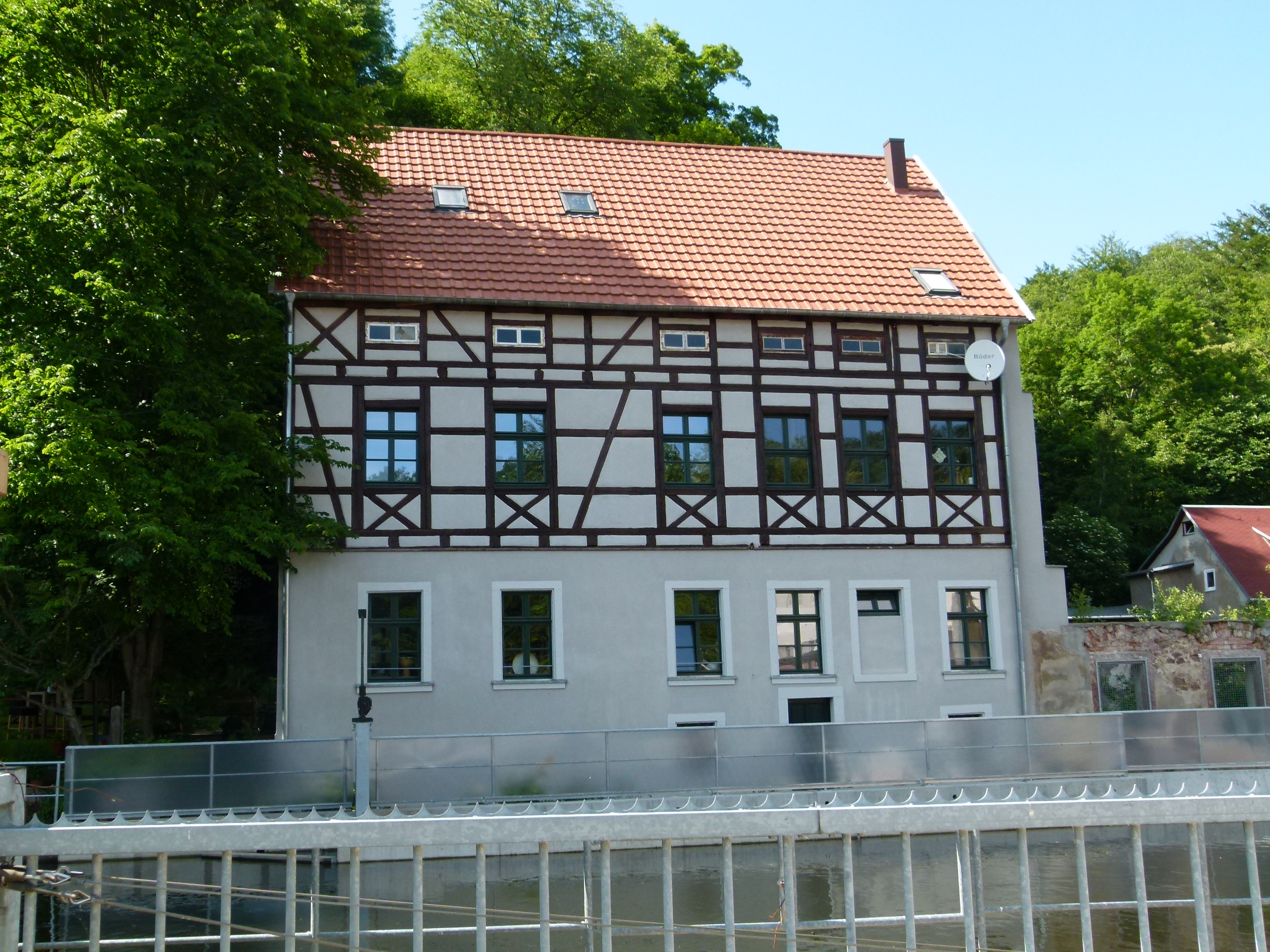
Old mill in Braunsdorf district Niederwiesa
