= Claußnitz =

- Municipality
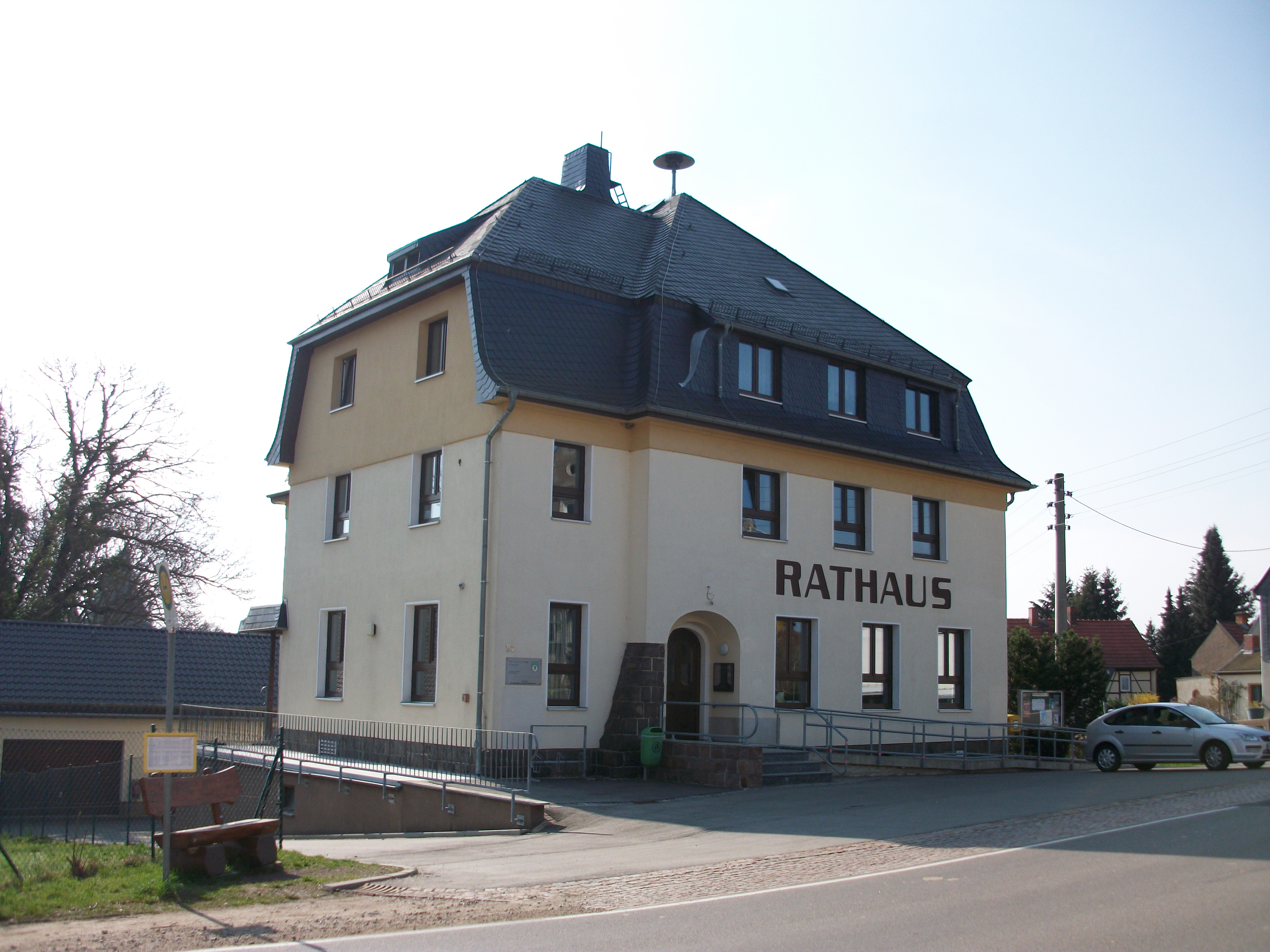
- Claußnitz town hall

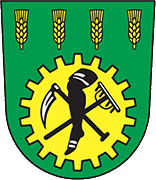
- Coat of arms

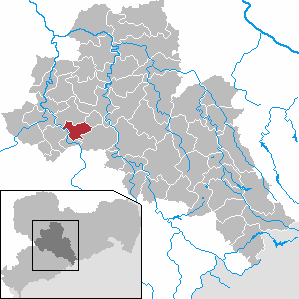
- Location of Claußnitz within Mittelsachsen district
- Interactive map of Claußnitz
- Location within Germany Location within Saxony
- Coordinates: 50°56′10″N 12°53′0″E
- Country: Germany
- State: Saxony
- District: Mittelsachsen

Government
  - Mayor (2019–26): Andreas Heinig

Area
  - Total: 21.38 km^{2} (8.25 sq mi)
- Elevation: 309 m (1,014 ft)

Population (2025-12-31)
  - Total: 2,868
  - Density: 134.1/km^{2} (347.4/sq mi)
- Time zone: UTC+01:00 (CET)
  - Summer (DST): UTC+02:00 (CEST)
- Postal codes: 09236
- Dialling codes: 037202
- Vehicle registration: FG
- Website: www.claussnitz.de

Claußnitz (German pronunciation: [ˈklaʊsnɪts]) is a municipality in the district of Mittelsachsen, Saxony, Germany.

== Twin towns ==
- Nová Ľubovňa, Slovakia
