= Königsfeld, Saxony =

Königsfeld
- Municipality
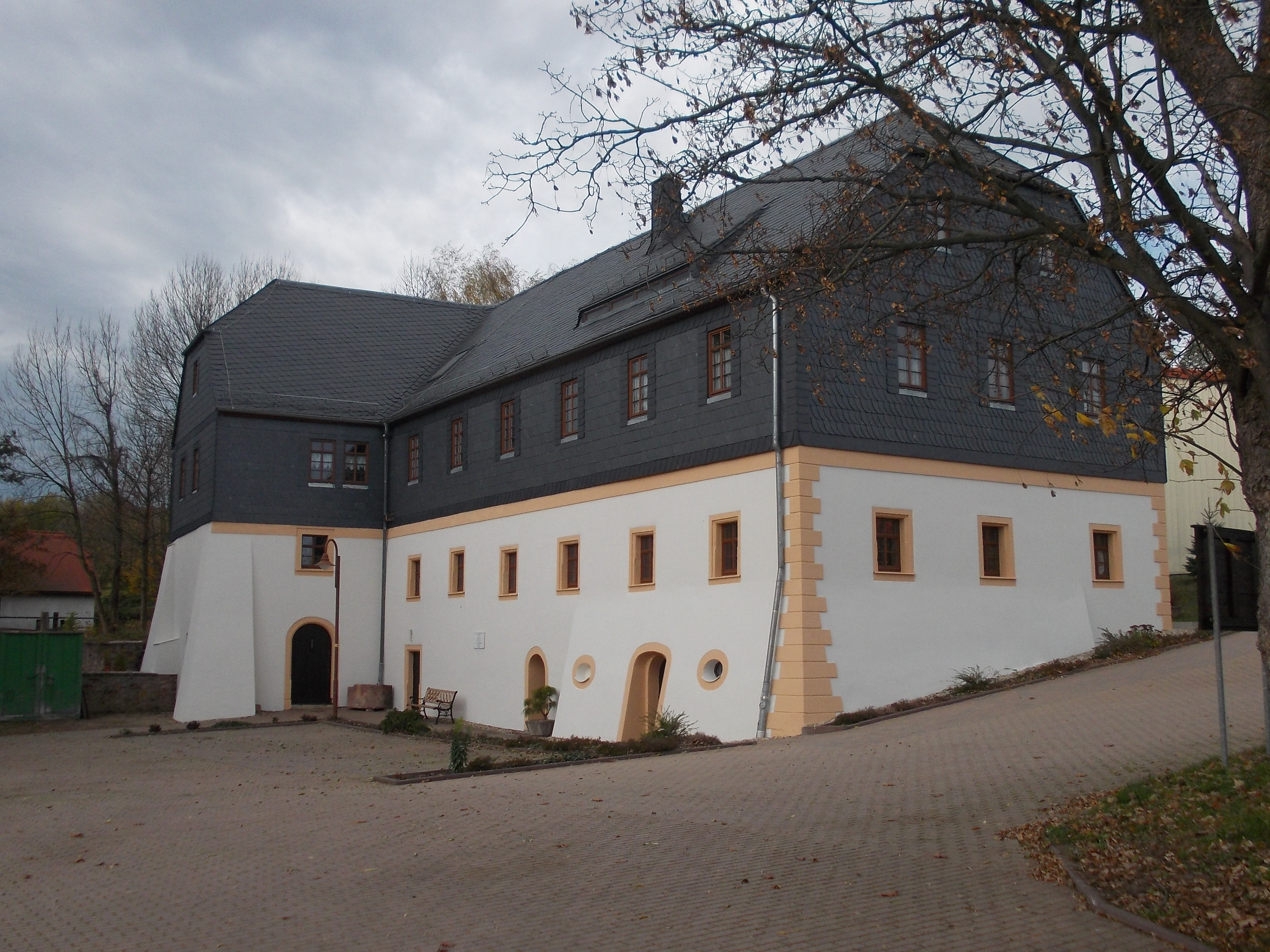
- Königsfeld town hall

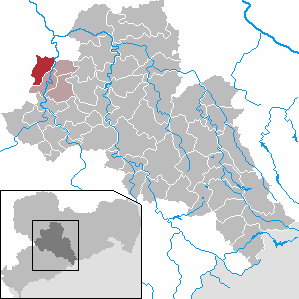
- Location of Königsfeld within Mittelsachsen district
- Interactive map of Königsfeld
- Location within Germany Location within Saxony
- Coordinates: 51°3′50″N 12°45′13″E
- Country: Germany
- State: Saxony
- District: Mittelsachsen
- Subdivisions: 9

Area
  - Total: 28.42 km^{2} (10.97 sq mi)
- Elevation: 209 m (686 ft)

Population (2025-12-31)
  - Total: 1,360
  - Density: 47.9/km^{2} (124/sq mi)
- Time zone: UTC+01:00 (CET)
  - Summer (DST): UTC+02:00 (CEST)
- Postal codes: 09306
- Dialling codes: 03737
- Vehicle registration: FG

Königsfeld (German pronunciation: [ˈkøːnɪçsˌfɛlt]) is a municipality in the district of Mittelsachsen, in Saxony, Germany.
