= Mühlau, Germany =

Mühlau
- Municipality
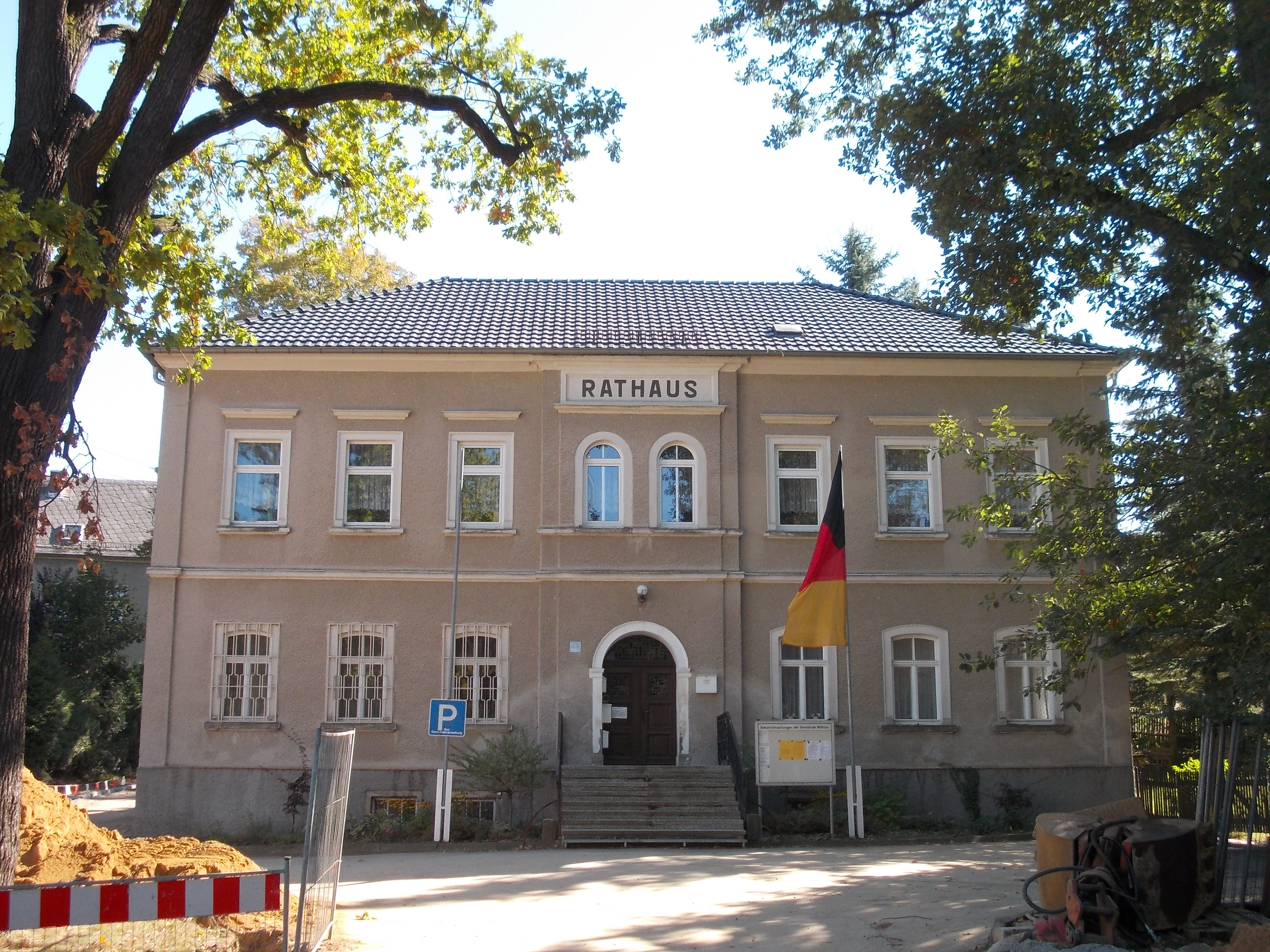
- Mühlau town hall

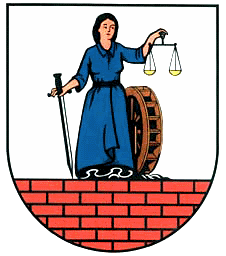
- Coat of arms

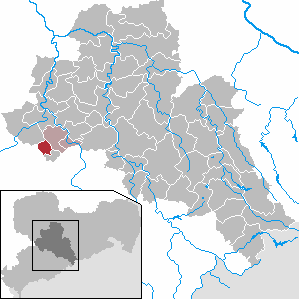
- Location of Mühlau within Mittelsachsen district
- Interactive map of Mühlau
- Location within Germany Location within Saxony
- Coordinates: 50°54′N 12°46′E
- Country: Germany
- State: Saxony
- District: Mittelsachsen

Government
  - Mayor (2021–28): Frank Rüger

Area
  - Total: 8.09 km^{2} (3.12 sq mi)
- Elevation: 329 m (1,079 ft)

Population (2025-12-31)
  - Total: 2,060
  - Density: 255/km^{2} (660/sq mi)
- Time zone: UTC+01:00 (CET)
  - Summer (DST): UTC+02:00 (CEST)
- Postal codes: 09241
- Dialling codes: 03722
- Vehicle registration: FG
- Website: www.muehlau-sachsen.de

Mühlau (German pronunciation: [ˈmyːlaʊ]) is a municipality in the district of Mittelsachsen, in Saxony, Germany. Mühlau lies in the arch mountain foothills approximately 3 kilometers to the north of Limbach-Oberfrohna, and 15 kilometers northwest of Chemnitz. The settlers of Mühlau originally came from Mehlem (currently part of Bonn) on the Rhine. The local name Mühlau is derived from the former home town.
