= Lichtenberg, Mittelsachsen =

Lichtenberg
- Municipality
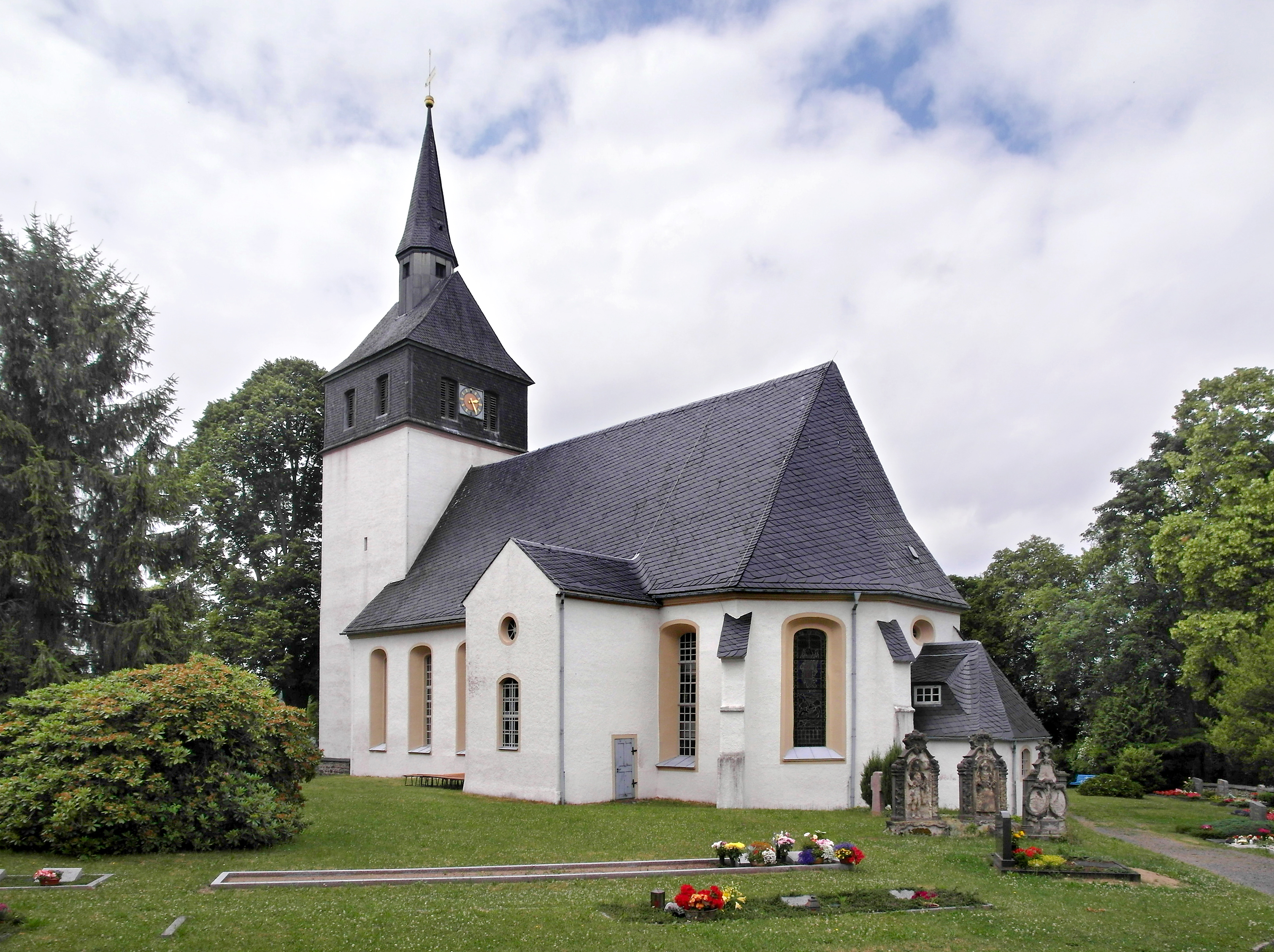
- Lichtenberg Church

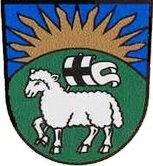
- Coat of arms

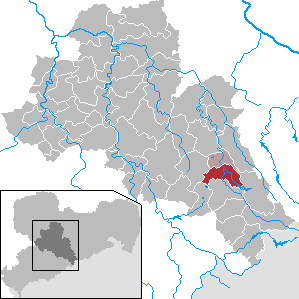
- Location of Lichtenberg within Mittelsachsen district
- Interactive map of Lichtenberg
- Location within Germany Location within Saxony
- Coordinates: 50°50′6″N 13°25′20″E
- Country: Germany
- State: Saxony
- District: Mittelsachsen
- Subdivisions: 3

Government
  - Mayor (2022–29): Steffi Schädlich

Area
  - Total: 33.39 km^{2} (12.89 sq mi)
- Elevation: 311 m (1,020 ft)

Population (2025-12-31)
  - Total: 2,598
  - Density: 77.81/km^{2} (201.5/sq mi)
- Time zone: UTC+01:00 (CET)
  - Summer (DST): UTC+02:00 (CEST)
- Postal codes: 09638
- Dialling codes: 037323
- Vehicle registration: FG
- Website: www.lichtenberg-erzgebirge.de

Lichtenberg (German pronunciation: [ˈlɪçtn̩bɛʁk]) is a municipality in the district of Mittelsachsen, in Saxony, Germany.
