= Altmittweida =

- Municipality
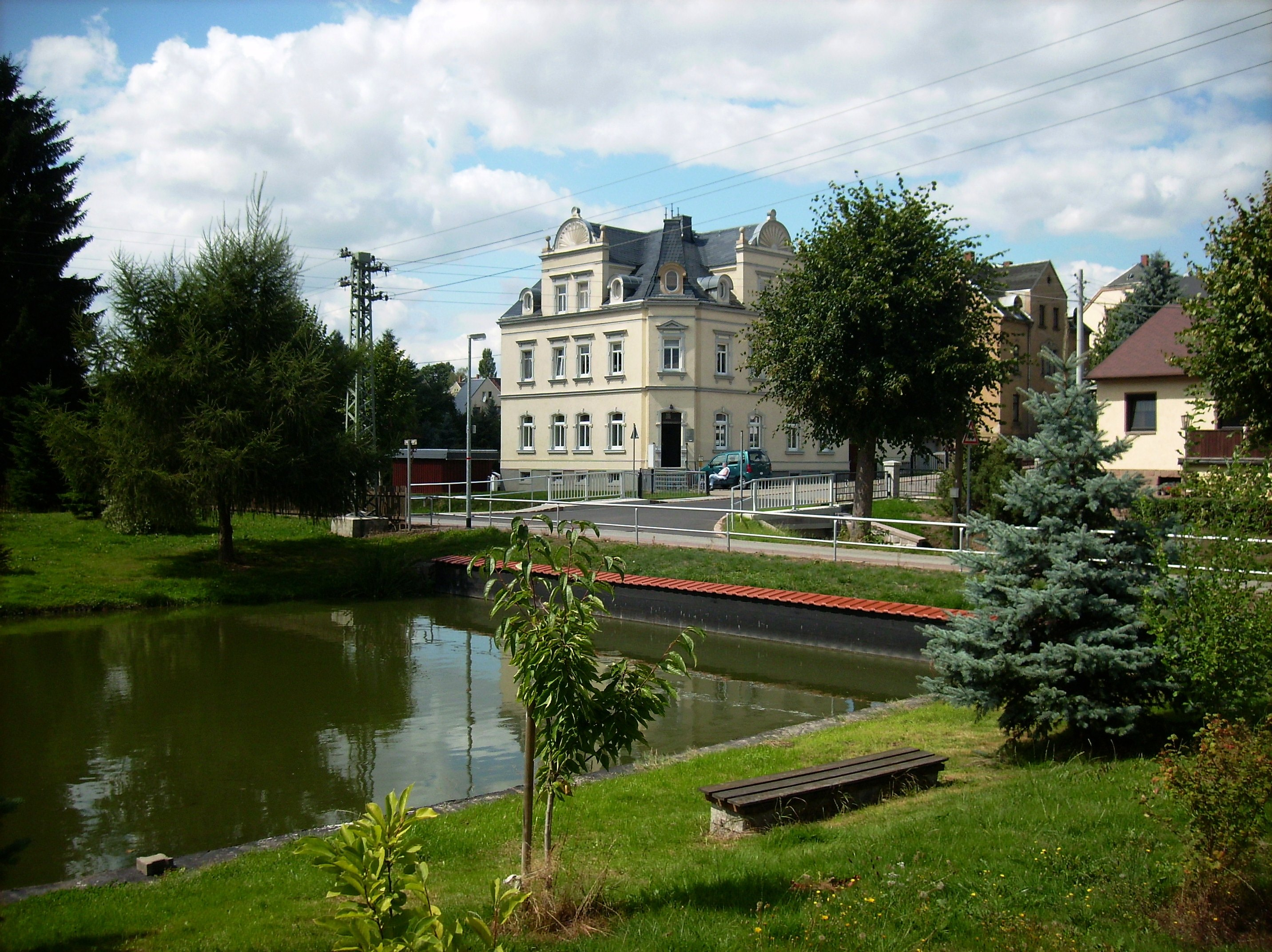
- Pond in Altmittweida

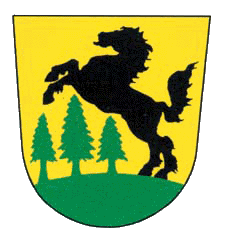
- Coat of arms

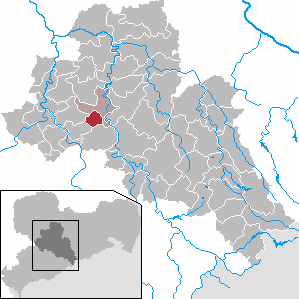
- Location of Altmittweida within Mittelsachsen district
- Interactive map of Altmittweida
- Location within Germany Location within Saxony
- Coordinates: 50°58′4″N 12°57′28″E
- Country: Germany
- State: Saxony
- District: Mittelsachsen

Government
  - Mayor (2018–25): Jens-Uwe Miether

Area
  - Total: 14.07 km^{2} (5.43 sq mi)
- Elevation: 286 m (938 ft)

Population (2025-12-31)
  - Total: 1,831
  - Density: 130.1/km^{2} (337.0/sq mi)
- Time zone: UTC+01:00 (CET)
  - Summer (DST): UTC+02:00 (CEST)
- Postal codes: 09648
- Dialling codes: 03727
- Vehicle registration: FG
- Website: Gemeinde Altmittweida

Altmittweida is a municipality in the district of Mittelsachsen, in Saxony, Germany.
