= Rossau, Saxony =

Rossau
- Municipality
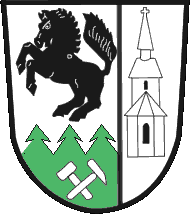
- Coat of arms

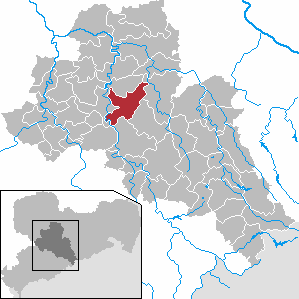
- Location of Rossau within Mittelsachsen district
- Interactive map of Rossau
- Location within Germany Location within Saxony
- Coordinates: 50°59′50″N 13°3′58″E
- Country: Germany
- State: Saxony
- District: Mittelsachsen
- Subdivisions: 9

Government
  - Mayor (2023–30): Dietmar Gottwald

Area
  - Total: 53.59 km^{2} (20.69 sq mi)
- Elevation: 318 m (1,043 ft)

Population (2025-12-31)
  - Total: 3,281
  - Density: 61.22/km^{2} (158.6/sq mi)
- Time zone: UTC+01:00 (CET)
  - Summer (DST): UTC+02:00 (CEST)
- Postal codes: 09661
- Dialling codes: 03727
- Vehicle registration: FG
- Website: www.gemeinde-rossau.de

Rossau (German pronunciation: [ˈʁɔsaʊ]) is a municipality in the district of Mittelsachsen, in Saxony, Germany.
