= Zettlitz =

- Municipality
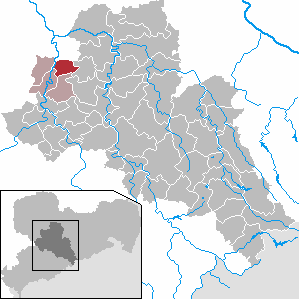
- Location of Zettlitz within Mittelsachsen district
- Interactive map of Zettlitz
- Location within Germany Location within Saxony
- Coordinates: 51°4′22″N 12°50′17″E
- Country: Germany
- State: Saxony
- District: Mittelsachsen
- Subdivisions: 6

Government
  - Mayor (2023–30): Thomas Arnold

Area
  - Total: 15.68 km^{2} (6.05 sq mi)
- Elevation: 262 m (860 ft)

Population (2025-12-31)
  - Total: 639
  - Density: 40.8/km^{2} (106/sq mi)
- Time zone: UTC+01:00 (CET)
  - Summer (DST): UTC+02:00 (CEST)
- Postal codes: 09306
- Dialling codes: 03737
- Vehicle registration: FG

Zettlitz (German pronunciation: [ˈtsɛtlɪts]) is a municipality in the district of Mittelsachsen, in Saxony, Germany.

== Population history ==
With 668 inhabitants on 31 December 2020, Zettlitz is the second smallest (by number of inhabitants) municipality in Saxony after Rathen with its 339 inhabitants.

- 1998: 1092
- 1999: 1118
- 2000: 1063
- 2001: 1053
- 2002: 1015
- 2003: 957
- 2004: 898
- 2005: 882
- 2007: 832
- 2009: 810
- 2010: 807
- 2011: 800

Data source: Statistisches Landesamt Sachsen
