= Königshain-Wiederau =

- Municipality
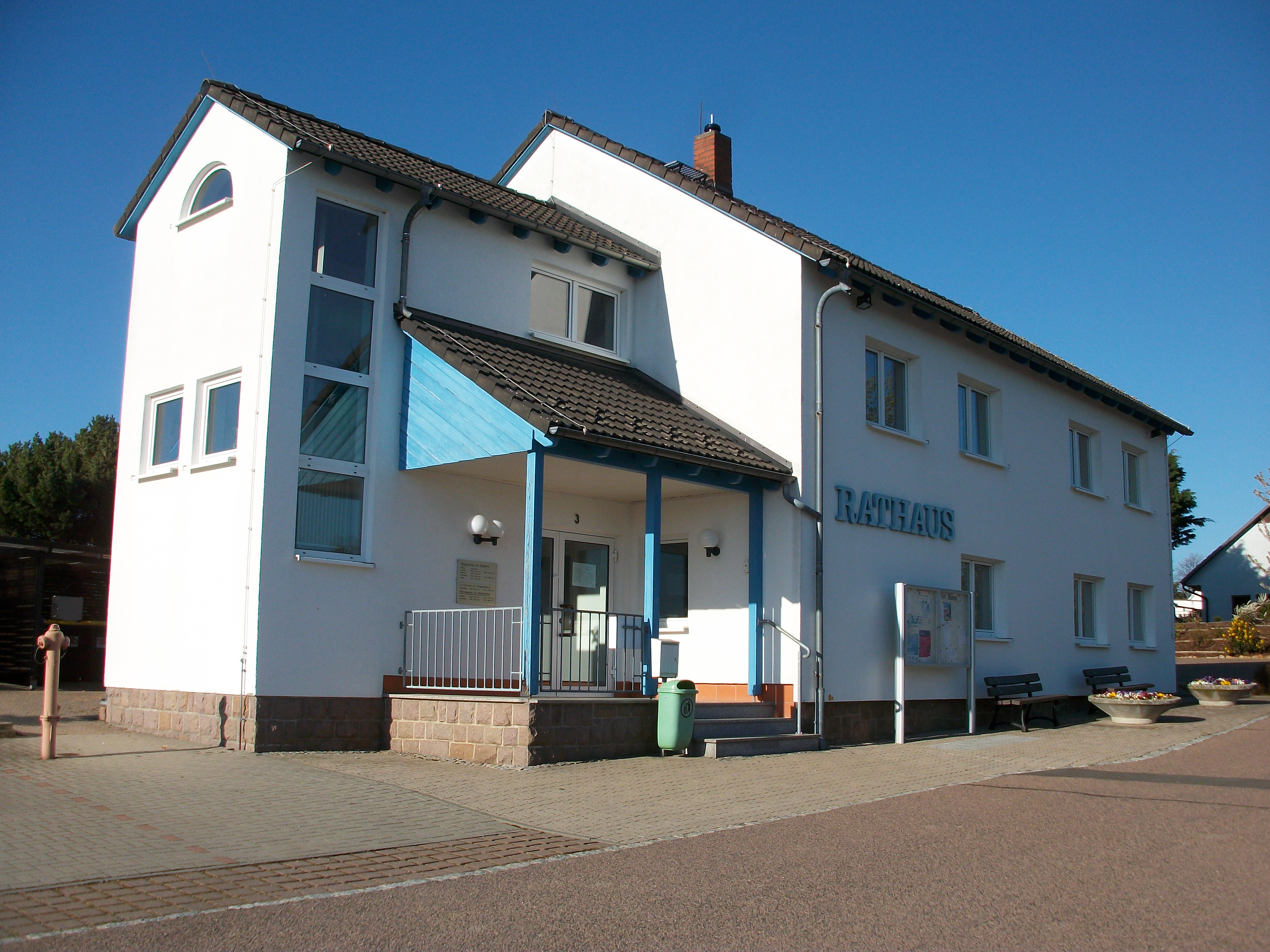
- Town hall

- Coat of arms

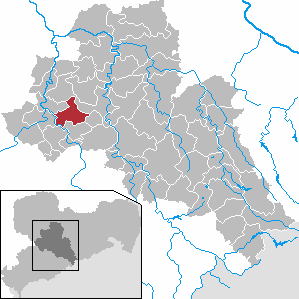
- Location of Königshain-Wiederau within Mittelsachsen district
- Interactive map of Königshain-Wiederau
- Location within Germany Location within Saxony
- Coordinates: 50°58′15″N 12°51′45″E
- Country: Germany
- State: Saxony
- District: Mittelsachsen
- Subdivisions: 4

Government
  - Mayor (2022–29): Johannes Voigt (CDU)

Area
  - Total: 30.89 km^{2} (11.93 sq mi)
- Elevation: 300 m (980 ft)

Population (2025-12-31)
  - Total: 2,481
  - Density: 80.32/km^{2} (208.0/sq mi)
- Time zone: UTC+01:00 (CET)
  - Summer (DST): UTC+02:00 (CEST)
- Postal codes: 09306
- Dialling codes: 037202
- Vehicle registration: FG
- Website: www.koenigshain-wiederau.de

Königshain-Wiederau is a municipality in the district of Mittelsachsen, in Saxony, Germany.

One area, Wiederau, is the birthplace of Clara Zetkin.
