= Halsbrücke =

- Municipality
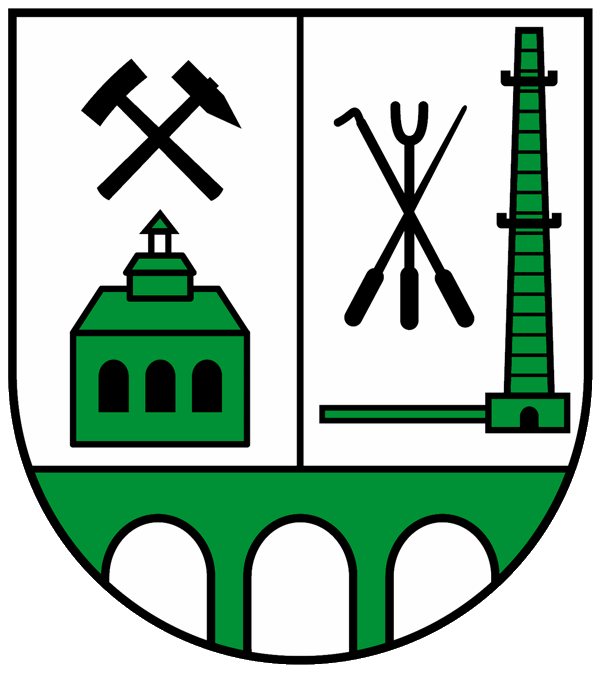
- Coat of arms

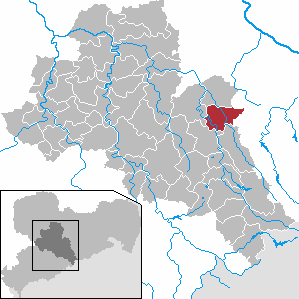
- Location of Halsbrücke within Mittelsachsen district
- Interactive map of Halsbrücke
- Location within Germany Location within Saxony
- Coordinates: 50°57′N 13°21′E
- Country: Germany
- State: Saxony
- District: Mittelsachsen
- Subdivisions: 7

Government
  - Mayor (2019–26): Andreas Beger (CDU)

Area
  - Total: 41.04 km^{2} (15.85 sq mi)
- Elevation: 350 m (1,150 ft)

Population (2025-12-31)
  - Total: 4,965
  - Density: 121.0/km^{2} (313.3/sq mi)
- Time zone: UTC+01:00 (CET)
  - Summer (DST): UTC+02:00 (CEST)
- Postal codes: 09633
- Dialling codes: 03731
- Vehicle registration: FG
- Website: www.halsbruecke.eu

Halsbrücke (German pronunciation: [halsˈbʁʏkə]) is a municipality and village in the district of Mittelsachsen, in Saxony, Germany. It is situated just north of Freiberg, on the banks of the Freiberger Mulde river.

== Geography ==
Halsbrücke lies 5 km north of Freiberg on the left bank of the Freiberger Mulde river. The lowest point in the area lies at around 296 metres above sea level, and the highest at 375 metres above sea level.

=== Districts ===
Within the Halsbrücke municipality lie the following districts:

- Conradsdorf
- Erlicht
- Falkenberg
- Haida
- Halsbrücke
- Hetzdorf
- Krummenhennersdorf
- Niederschöna
- Oberschaar
- Tuttendorf

== History ==
Halsbrücke was originally founded in 1349 as an estate named czu dem Halse, belonging to the Altzella monastery in Nossen. The name referred to a ridge on the bend of the river which was said to have a "neck"-like formation (German Hals). The area belonged to the city of Freiberg from the 16th century onwards.

The bridge (German Brücke) was included in later variations of the municipality's name, namely czu der brucken am Hals (1441), an der Halßbrücken (1654), and Halßbrücke (1706).

While the municipality today stretches both sides of the river, Halsbrücke was formerly divided between two administrative regions. On the left bank of the Freiberger Mulde, the areas of Hals and Neu belonged to the city of Freiberg, while Sand and Grüneberg came under the jurisdiction of Meissen.

Halsbrücke had no church of its own for most of its history, instead coming under the parish of Tuttendorf. The church of St. Lorenz am Schulberg was then constructed between 1985 and 1991, and opened in 1992. The municipality was serviced by a rail connection, namely the Freiberg-Halsbrücke line, from 1890 until the line's closure in 1995. The station still exists, unused.

In 2017 the criminal gang of esoteric-leader Peter Fitzek acquired a castle-like building with the plan to establish a self-sufficient village there. The seller of the Kanzleilehngut is Dresden architect and businessman Torsten Fischer. Fischer runs the Plantagengut Hosterwitz guesthouse in Dresden. In 2025 the gang get band by the federal government.

== Mayors ==
- 1990–2012: Jörg Kiehne (CDU)
- since 2012: Andreas Beger

== Gallery ==
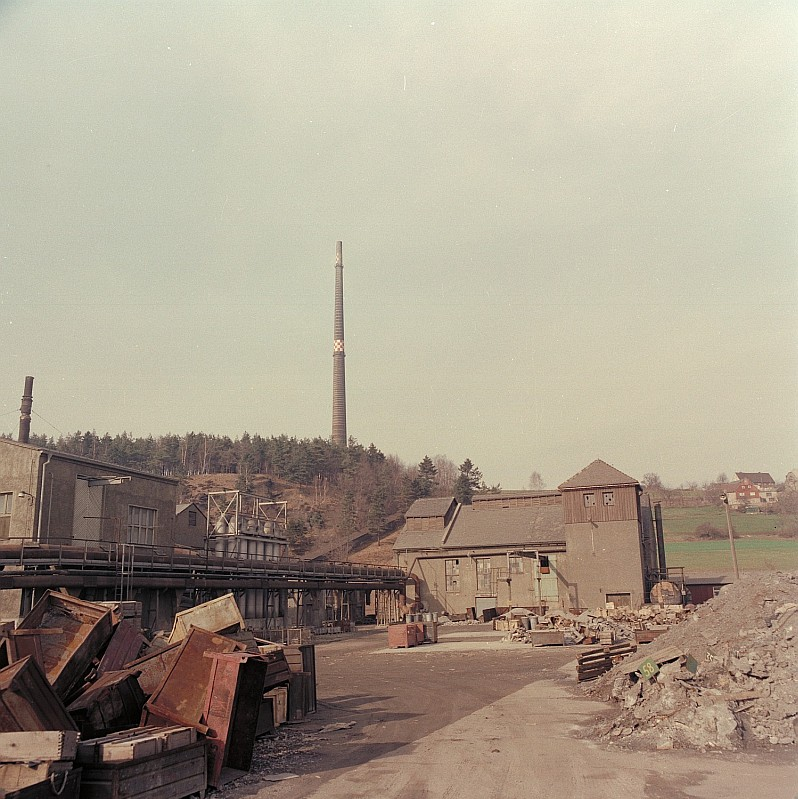

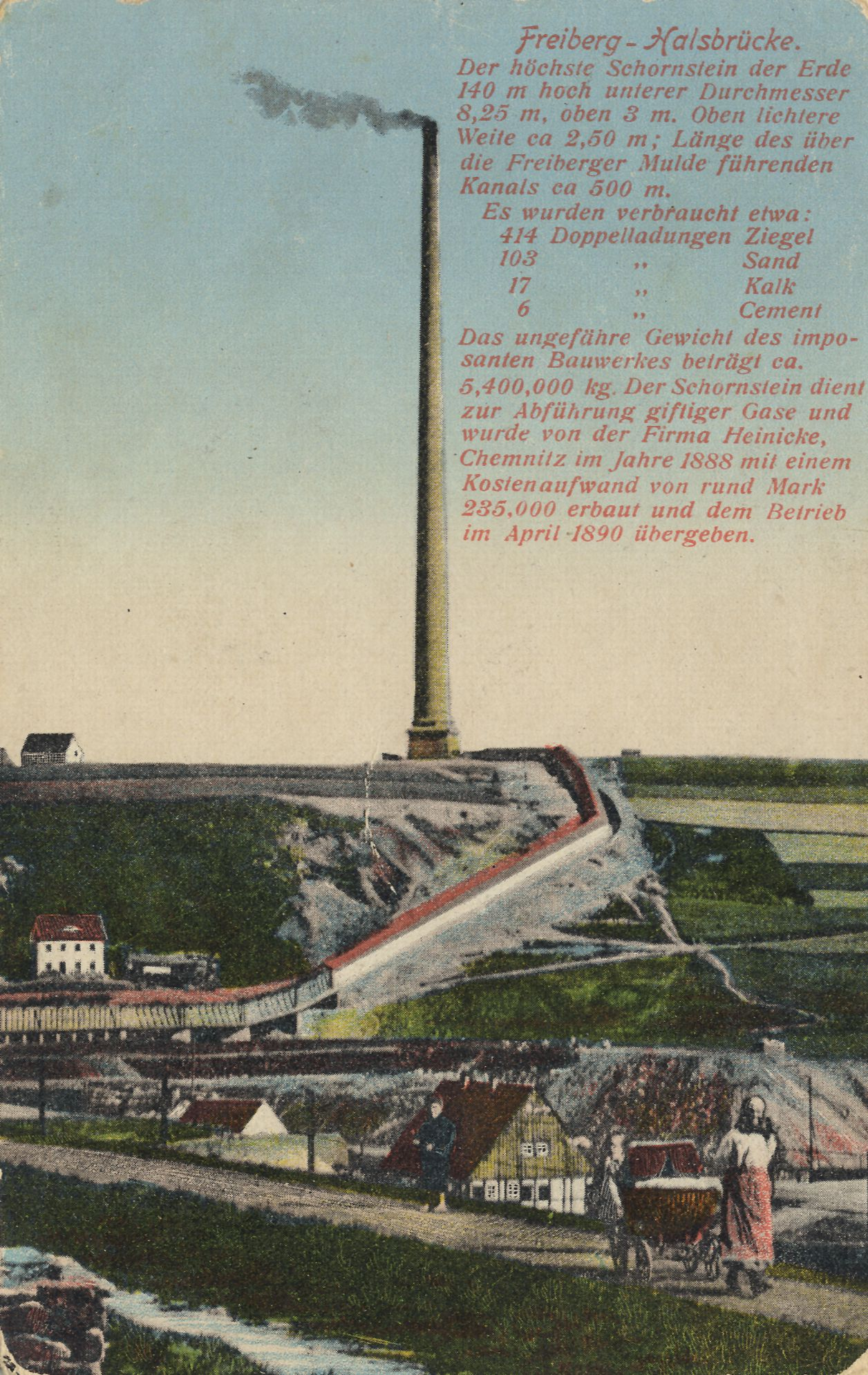
Postcard

== Notable people ==
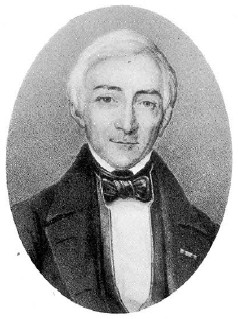
Ferdinand Reich

- Albert I, Margrave of Meissen (1158–1195), Margrave of Meißen
- Wilhelm August Lampadius (1777–1842), metallurgical technician, chemist and agronomist, established the first European illuminated gas station in Halsbrücke in 1815
- Ferdinand Reich (1799–1882), chemist and physicist, researches on the smelting of huts, apparatus for the determination of sulfuric gases in the air
