= Oberschöna =

- Municipality
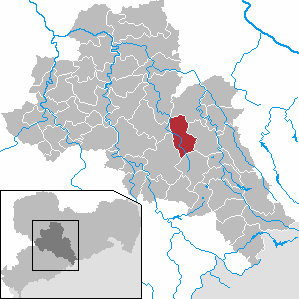
- Location of Oberschöna within Mittelsachsen district
- Interactive map of Oberschöna
- Location within Germany Location within Saxony
- Coordinates: 50°53′51″N 13°15′10″E
- Country: Germany
- State: Saxony
- District: Mittelsachsen
- Subdivisions: 6

Government
  - Mayor (2022–29): Rico Gerhardt (CDU)

Area
  - Total: 44.22 km^{2} (17.07 sq mi)
- Elevation: 310–470 m (1,020–1,540 ft)

Population (2025-12-31)
  - Total: 3,149
  - Density: 71.21/km^{2} (184.4/sq mi)
- Time zone: UTC+01:00 (CET)
  - Summer (DST): UTC+02:00 (CEST)
- Postal codes: 09600, 09603
- Dialling codes: 03731; 037321
- Vehicle registration: FG
- Website: www.oberschöna.de

Oberschöna is a municipality in the district of Mittelsachsen, in Saxony, Germany.

== History ==
Oberschöna was first mentioned in documents in 1183. In a charter from 1185, which describes the borders of the eastern holdings of Altzella Monastery, the so-called four Eckhard villages are also mentioned. These were fiefs of the Hessian Hersfeld Abbey. Later research concluded that Oberschöna, Linda, as well as Wegefarth and probably St. Michaelis belonged to these villages.

Since 1445/1447, a knight’s seat (Rittersitz) or manor farm (Vorwerk) existed in Oberschöna, which has been referred to as a Rittergut since 1551. From the 14th century until 1761, it was owned by the von Schönberg family, after which it belonged until 1771 to the district captain (Amtshauptmann) of the von Gersdorff family, and thereafter until at least 1860 to the von Carlowitz family. The manor estate of Oberschöna included, besides Oberschöna itself, the villages of Oberreichenbach and Kirchbach. Until the 16th century, the town of Hainichen and the villages of Wingendorf and Frankenstein were also subject to the manor of Oberschöna, but later came under the jurisdiction of the manor of Wingendorf.

After the secularisation of Altzella Abbey in the 16th century, Oberschöna belonged until 1856 to the Freiberg district office of Electoral Saxony and later the Kingdom of Saxony. From 1856, the village belonged to the Freiberg court office (Gerichtsamt), and from 1875 to the Freiberg administrative authority (Amtshauptmannschaft).

After World War II, the manor house of Rittergut Oberschöna was demolished. One farm building has been preserved to this day.

As a result of the second district reform in the German Democratic Republic, Oberschöna became part of the Freiberg district in the Chemnitz district (renamed Karl-Marx-Stadt district in 1953) in 1952. From 1990 it belonged to the Saxon district of Freiberg, which was merged into the district of Mittelsachsen in 2008.

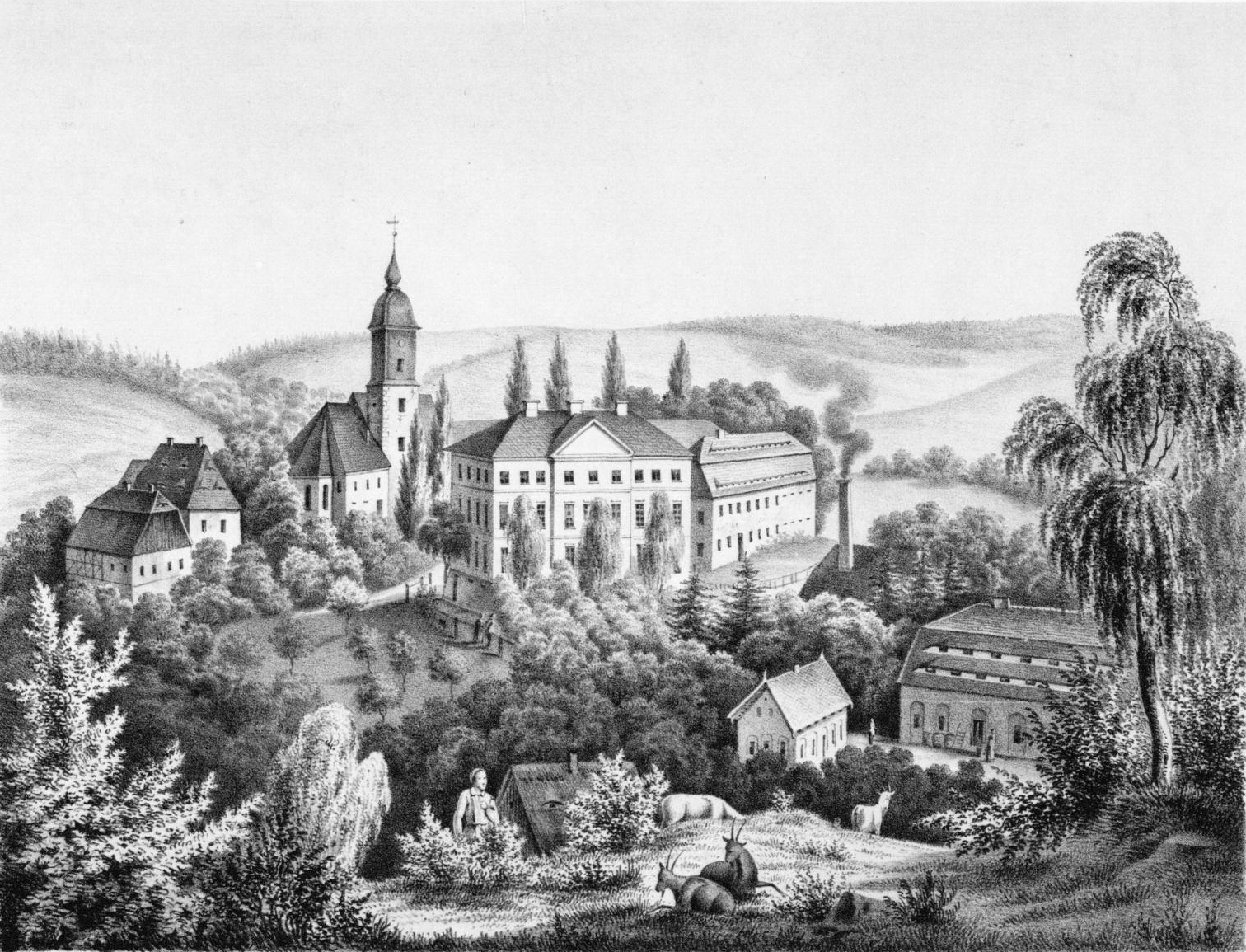
Rittergut Oberschöna (around 1860)

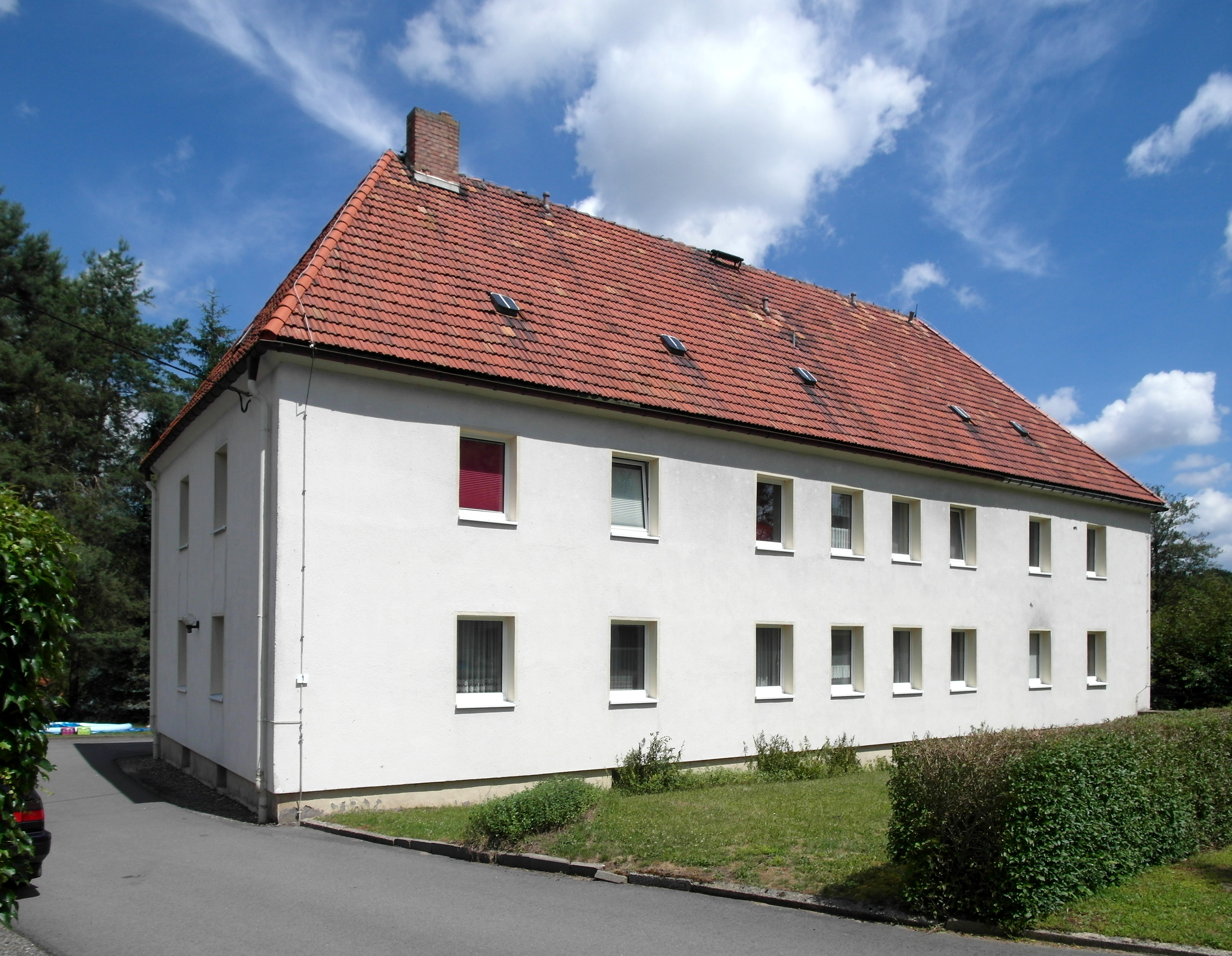
Rittergut Oberschöna. Residential building on the foundations of the former castle

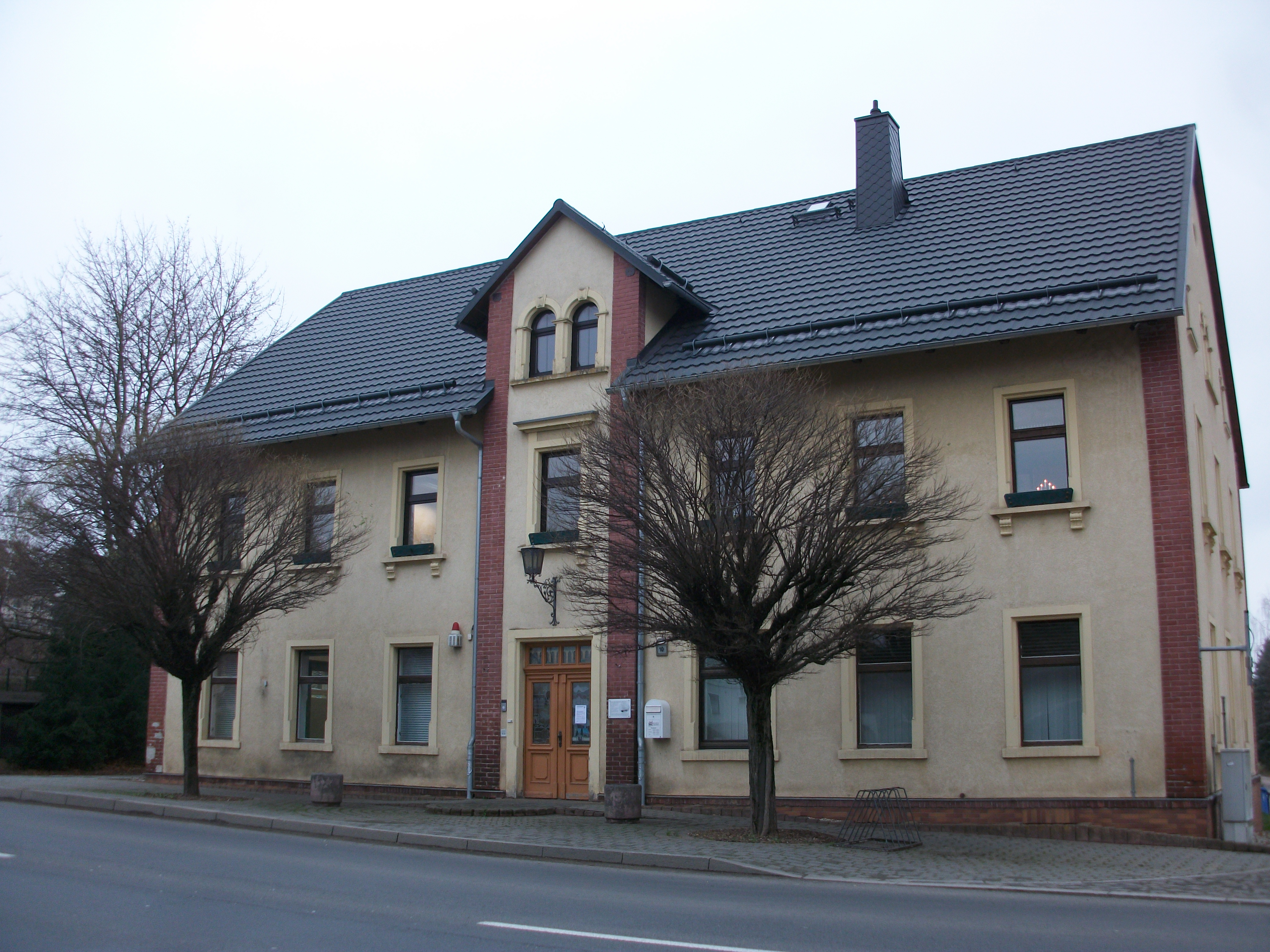
Municipal office of Oberschöna, former manor court (Erbgericht)
