= Weißenborn, Saxony =

Weißenborn
- Municipality
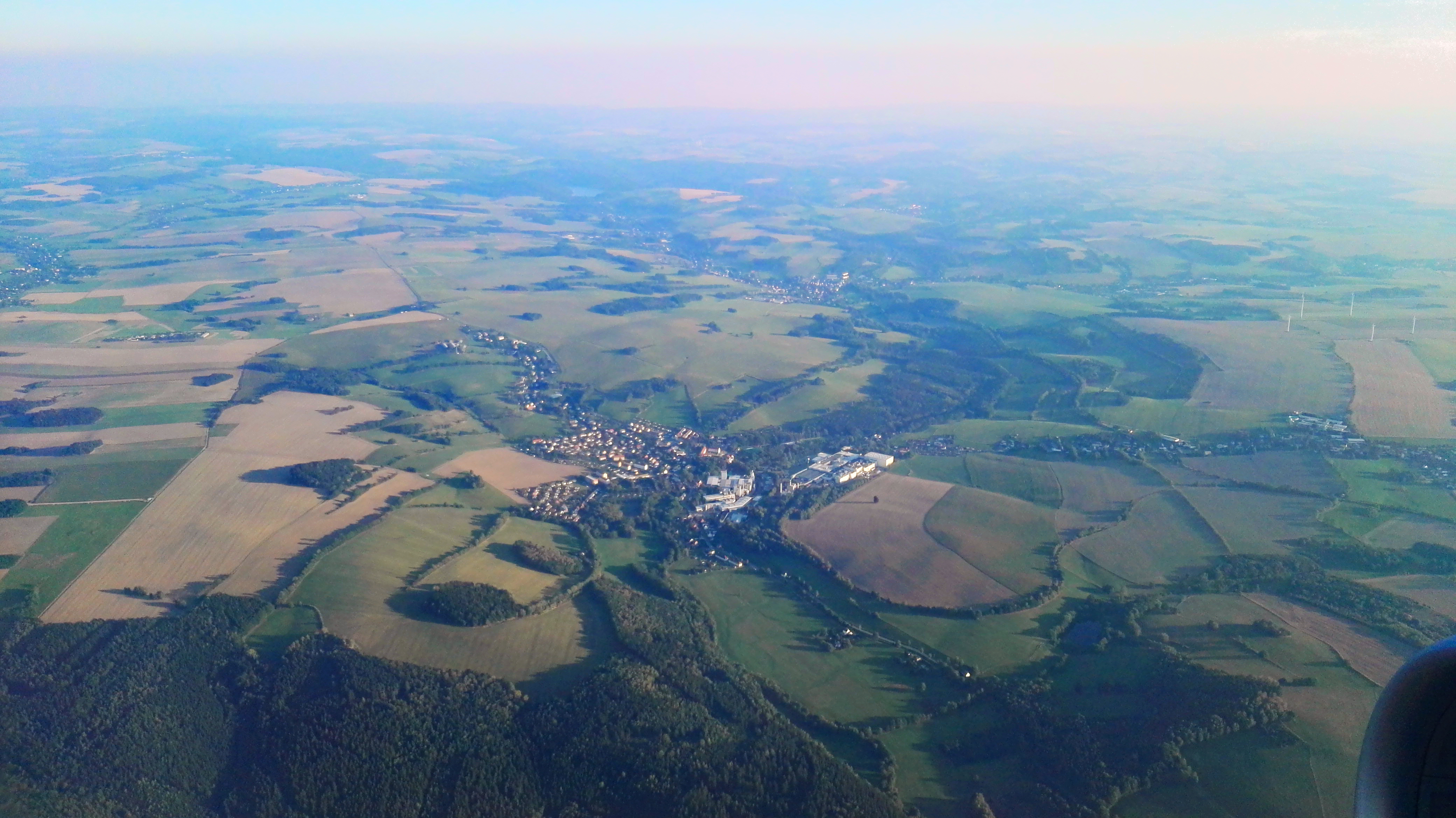
- Aerial view of Weißenborn (2016)

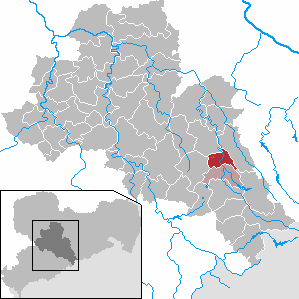
- Location of Weißenborn within Mittelsachsen district
- Interactive map of Weißenborn
- Location within Germany Location within Saxony
- Coordinates: 50°52′N 13°25′E
- Country: Germany
- State: Saxony
- District: Mittelsachsen

Government
  - Mayor (2022–29): Udo Kai Eckert

Area
  - Total: 22.57 km^{2} (8.71 sq mi)
- Elevation: 488 m (1,601 ft)

Population (2025-12-31)
  - Total: 2,385
  - Density: 105.7/km^{2} (273.7/sq mi)
- Time zone: UTC+01:00 (CET)
  - Summer (DST): UTC+02:00 (CEST)
- Postal codes: 09600
- Dialling codes: 03731
- Vehicle registration: FG
- Website: www.weissenborn-erzgebirge.de

Weißenborn (German pronunciation: [ˈvaɪsn̩bɔʁn]) is a municipality in the district of Mittelsachsen, in Saxony, Germany.
