= Kriebstein =

- Municipality
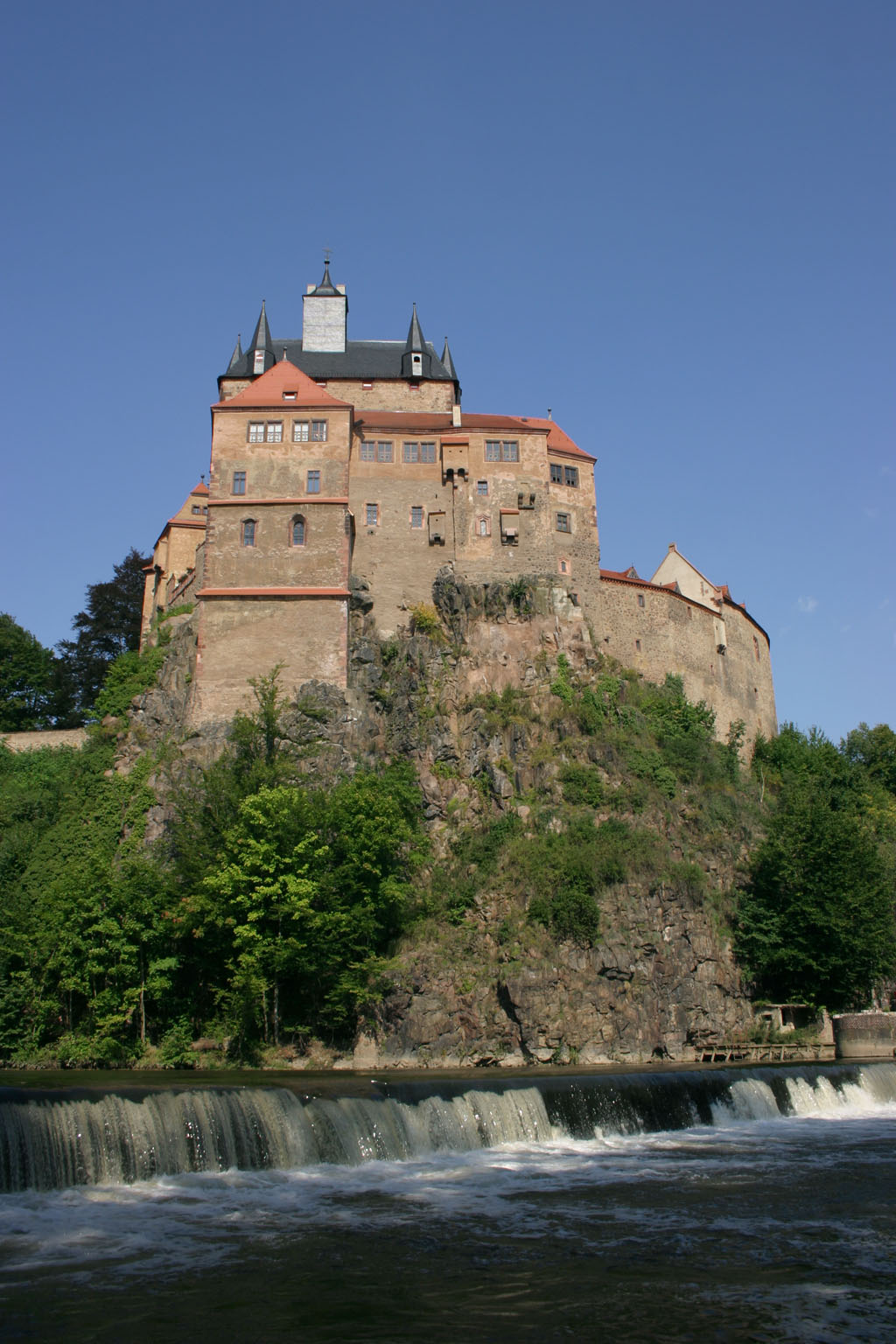
- Kriebstein Castle

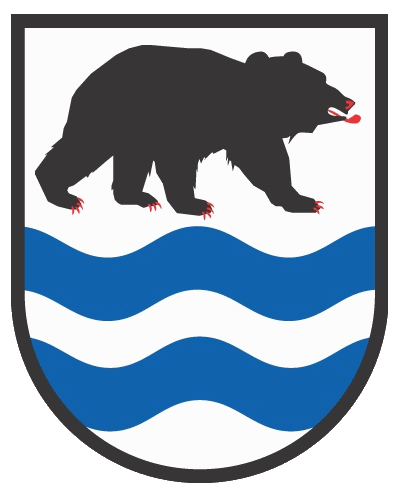
- Coat of arms

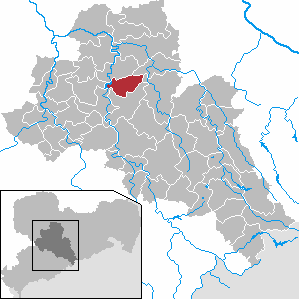
- Location of Kriebstein within Mittelsachsen district
- Interactive map of Kriebstein
- Location within Germany Location within Saxony
- Coordinates: 51°3′0″N 13°1′11″E
- Country: Germany
- State: Saxony
- District: Mittelsachsen
- Subdivisions: 7

Government
  - Mayor (2022–29): Maria Euchler

Area
  - Total: 31.08 km^{2} (12.00 sq mi)
- Elevation: 272 m (892 ft)

Population (2025-12-31)
  - Total: 1,940
  - Density: 62.4/km^{2} (162/sq mi)
- Time zone: UTC+01:00 (CET)
  - Summer (DST): UTC+02:00 (CEST)
- Postal codes: 09648
- Dialling codes: 034327
- Vehicle registration: FG
- Website: www.kriebstein.de

Kriebstein (German pronunciation: [ˈkʁiːpʃtaɪn]) is a municipality in the district of Mittelsachsen, in Saxony, Germany.
