= Käthe Seidel =

German botanist

- Born: 1907; Frankenstein, Saxony, Germany
- Died: 1990 (aged 82–83); Krefeld, Germany
- Known for: Ecological design
- Movement: Use of plants in constructed wetlands for wastewater treatment
- Awards: Order of Merit & Cross of Merit of the Federal Republic of Germany

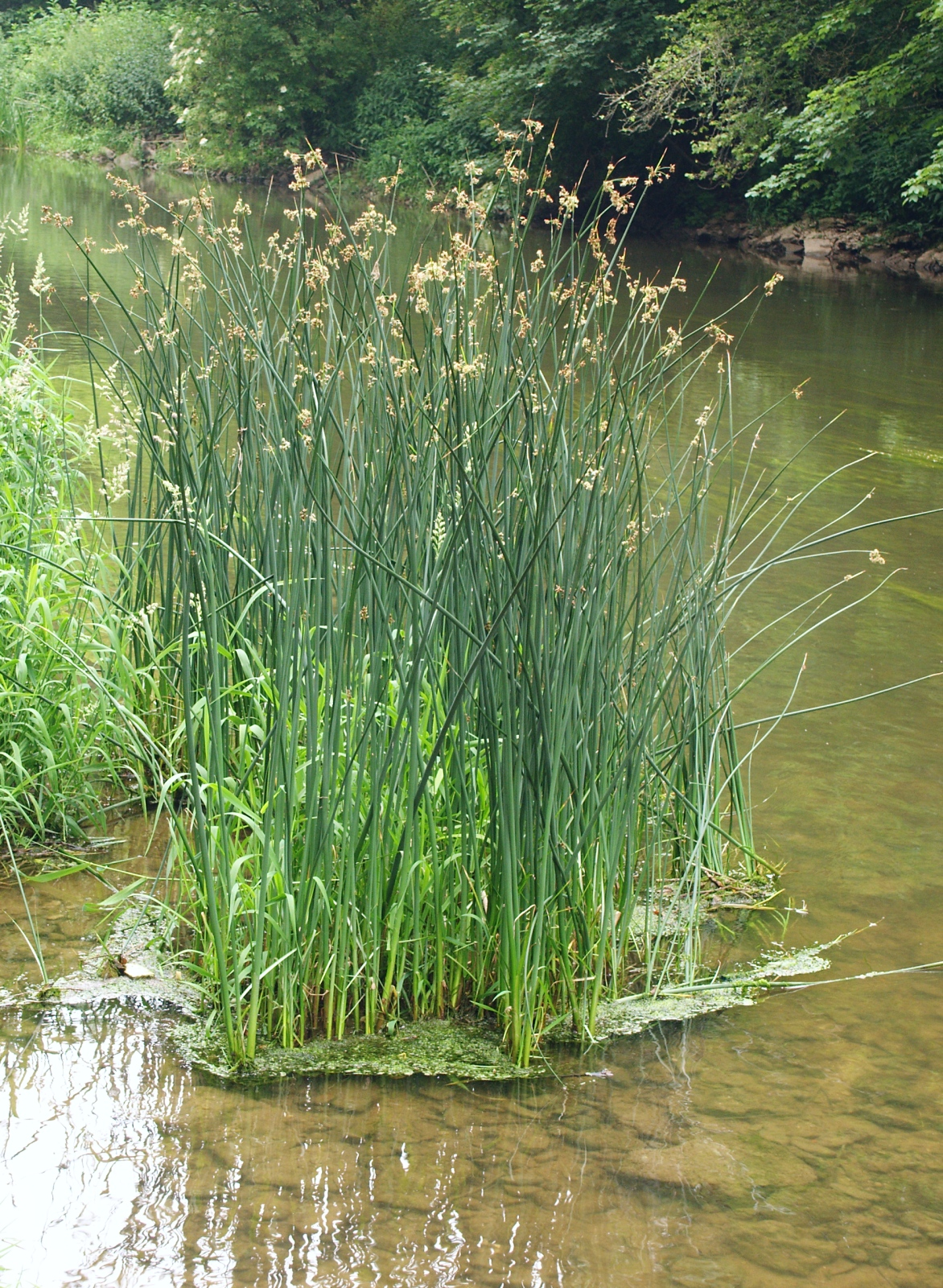
Schoenoplectus lacustris, lakeshore bulrush

Käthe Seidel (1907-1990) was a German botanist. Seidel was the first researcher to incorporate vegetation into wastewater treatment wetlands, beginning in the 1950s. She was nicknamed "Bulrush Kate" ("Die Binzen Kaethe") for her use of the common bulrush, Schoenoplectus lacustris. For many years, she led the Limnological Station of the Lower Rhine (Limnologische Station Niederrhein) based in the city of Krefeld. Focusing on studies of the Lower Rhine, the Limnological Station was associated with various institutions that became part of the Max Planck Society.

The approach to constructed wetlands that Seidel originated is variously referred to as the Seidel system, the Krefeld system, and the Max Planck Institute process (MPIP). Her work is the earliest example of vertical flow constructed wetlands, now used widely in Europe and elsewhere. Seidel was also the first to propose horizontal sub-surface flow systems, an area of research that was further explored by her student Reinhold Kickuth. She has been called the "Mother of constructed wetlands".

== Education ==
Käthe Seidel was born in 1907 in Frankenstein, Saxony, Germany (now part of the town of Oederan) where she attended school. She trained as a gardener at the agricultural college in Halle, Germany, the Landwirtschaftlichen Hochschule, qualifying at the master's level in 1934. Next, she trained as a horticultural teacher at a college of teacher education in Leipzig, becoming qualified to teach biology, horticulture and plant education.

In 1939 she began studying at the University of Greifswald, taking classes in art history and natural sciences. Her studies there were interrupted by World War II, but she had already written extensively, publishing 22 works between 1922 and 1945. In 1947, Seidel continued her studies at Kiel. At the age of 47, on 26 February 1951, Seidel received her doctorate for the dissertation Die Flechtbinse, a study of the plant Scirpus lacustris which lives in riparian zones with slow flowing water.

== Career ==
For many years, Seidel led the Limnological Station of the Lower Rhine (Limnologische Station Niederrhein), based in Krefeld. The Limnological Station was founded in 1928 to study the waters of the Lower Rhine. The Limnological Station became associated with the Kaiser Wilhelm Society as of 1937, earning the name of "Limnologische Station der Kaiser Wilhelm-Gesellschaft".

Following World War II, the Kaiser Wilhelm Society was replaced by the Max Planck Society. Max Planck Gesellschaft was founded in the British zone as of 11 September 1946, and again for the British and American occupation zones as of 26 February 1948.

In 1953 the Limnological Station in Krefeld became a field station of the Hydrobiological Institute of the Max Planck Society in Plön (Hydrobiologischen Anstalt der Max-Planck-Gesellschaft). The Hydrobiological Institute in Plön was directed from 1917 to 1957 by August Thienemann. Thienemann considered Seidel to have made significant contributions to the Hydrobiological Institute, through the vitality and energy she brought to her long-term position at the field station in Krefeld.

In 1957 August Thienemann was succeeded as director of the Hydrobiological Institute by Harald Sioli. In 1966, the Hydrobiological Institute became the Max Planck Institute for Limnology (MPIL) at Plön.

In November 1968, the Max Planck Society closed the limnological station in Krefeld, but allowed Seidel to continue working there until she officially retired in 1976. She then established her own "Stiftung Limnologische Arbeitsgruppe Dr. Seidel e.V.", and continued to work for another 14 years. She died in 1990.

In 2007, the Max Planck Institute for Limnology became the Max Planck Institute for Evolutionary Biology.

== Research ==
Käthe Seidel was the first researcher to incorporate vegetation into wastewater treatment wetlands. Beginning in the 1950s, Seidel conducted experiments into the use of marsh vegetation to improve water quality. In 1957, she demonstrated the effectiveness of her approach near Krefeld, Germany. Having observed the luxuriant growth of bulrushes in polluted water, she created an artificial bulrush marsh. She pumped heavily polluted water from the Rhine River into the test marsh, and measured the effluent that emerged. After a week or two in the marsh, the water that emerged was substantially lower in phosphorus and nitrogen content, and showed increases in oxygen. This filtration method was both energy efficient and inexpensive, costing about 1/3 of the cost of a conventional system at that time.

"I came here with that intention -- to show that waters must first be reconstituted with plants. And if this were understood and acted on wherever dirty effluents are poured into bodies of water, we would not have such problems today. Unfortunately, biologists have never adequately concerned themselves with plants. Even at our Max Planck Institute, there were well-known chemists, zoologists, microbiologists, but no one concerned with plants. In fact, they laughed at me." – Käthe Seidel

Seidel's work directly challenged the received wisdom of the time, which was that higher plants could only grow in unpolluted waters. She demonstrated that the plants adapted themselves to extreme water conditions and helped to improve the quality of the water. Over the course of her career, Seidel published many studies about the treatment of wastewater using wetland plants. In 1966, she examined ten plants for potential use in the passive water treatment of contaminated water in mines, and reported that Schoenoplectus lacustris, which supplied the water with oxygen, was the only effective candidate. This led to the construction of a treatment plant in Liebenburg–Othfresen, Germany in 1974, and the adoption of the approach in a number of other countries. She was successful in demonstrating the removal of phenols from wastewater, and the treatment of dairy wastewater using Scirpus lacustris.

Today, it is recognized that Seidel's plant water treatment plants, which use rushes and other macrophytes such as Iris, Phragmites, and Arundo, are very useful. They are particularly effective where there is ample space, in areas of low population density, and in developing countries. If heavy metals are involved, it is possible to remove them from wastewater using plants, but the plants themselves then need to be treated as special waste, and cannot be used for food or forage. Although it took time for Seidel's work to be appreciated, she inspired many people in the field of ecological design, including biologist John Todd and artist and architect Friedensreich Hundertwasser.

== Recognition ==
In 1977 Käthe Seidel received the Environmental Medal of the Federal Republic of Germany, and in 1982 the Cross of Merit.

Seidel died in 1990. In 2003, 13 years after her death, the institute organized a workshop in her honor as a pioneer in sewage purification by plants.

== Selected publications ==
For a bibliography of Seidel's publications, see also Bibliografie von Publikationen von Dr. Käthe Seidel.

- (1935) Gartenbau im Landjahr. (Appelhans)
- (1943) Binsenarbeiten: Die neuen Binsengegenstände, gemeinsam erarbeitet mit Gertrud Mosenthin. (Voggenreiter)
- (1955) Die Flechtbinse. Scirpus lacustris L. Ökologie, Morphologie und Entwicklung, ihre Stellung bei den Völkern und ihre wirtschaftliche Bedeutung. (E. Schweizerbartsche Verlagsbuchhandlung)
- (1959) Wird die Flechtbinse zum zweiten Male Kolonisationspflanze? Ihre Aufgabe im 19. und im 20. Jahrhundert (Schleswig-Holstein).
- (1963) Über Phenolspeicherung und Phenolabbau in Wasserpflanzen.- Naturwiss. 50: 452 f.
- (1964) Abbau von Bacterium coli durch höhere Wasserpflanzen.- Naturwiss. 51: 395
- (1966) Reinigung von Gewässern durch höhere Pflanzen.
- (1969) Zur bakteriziden Wirkung höherer Pflanzen.
- (1970) Mixotrophie bei Scirpus lacustris L.
- (1971) Physiologische Leistung von Alisma plantago L. (Froschlöffel).- Naturwiss. 58: 151
- (1971) Wirkung höherer Pflanzen auf pathogene Keime in Gewässern.- Naturwiss. 58: 150 f.
- (1973) System for Purification of Polluted Water.- United States Patent Office, Nr. 3770623
- (1973) Reinigung von Industrie-Abwässern durch Juncus maritimus Lamarck.- Naturwiss. 60: 158 f.
- (1973) Zur Biologie und Wasser-Reinigungsvermögen von Iris pseudacorus L.- ibidem.
- (1974) Schoenoplectus lacustris (L.) Palla zur Reinigung von Gichtwässern.- Naturwiss. 61: 81
- (1976) Über die Selbstreinigung natürlicher Gewässer.- Naturwiss. 63: 286-291
- (1976) Macrophytes and water purification.- In: J. Tourbier and R.W. Pierson, Jr.(Eds.): Biological control of water pollution. University of Pennsylvania Press, Philadelphia (PA), p. 109-121.
- (1978) Beiträge zur Gewässergesundung. 2., erw. Aufl. (Krefeld-Hülseberg)
- (1978) Seidel, K., Happel, H. and Graue, G. Contributions to Revitalisation of Waters. Published by Stiftung Limnologische Arbeitsgruppe, translated by Lillian Meetz, Krefeld-Hülserberg.
- (1988) Käthe Seidel und Helga Happel: Limnologie in Stichworten: Beiträge aus den Wasser-Kalendern 1980–1988 (Jahrbuch für das gesamte Wasserfach).
