= John Todd (Canadian biologist) =

Canadian biologist (born 1939)

- Born: 1939 (age 86–87); Hamilton, Ontario, Canada
- Education: McGill University, University of Michigan
- Awards: Chrysler Award for Innovation in Design, 1994; Environmental Merit Award, 1996; Bioneers Lifetime Achievement Award, 1998; Buckminster Fuller Challenge, 2008
- Scientific career
- Fields: Ecological design
- Workplaces: New Alchemy Institute, Ocean Arks International, University of Vermont, John Todd Ecological Design Inc.

John Todd (born 1939) is a Canadian biologist working in the general field of ecological design. He addresses problems of food production and wastewater processing by using ecosystems technologies that incorporate plants, animals and bacteria. Todd has developed "Arks" or "bioshelters", ecologically closed "life-support systems" with the goal of sustainable functioning. He combines alternative technologies for renewable energy, organic farming, aquaculture, hydroponics and architecture to create "living machines" or "eco-machines".

John Todd is a co-founder with Nancy Jack Todd of the non-profits New Alchemy Institute (1969–1991) and Ocean Arks International (1981), and the founder and president of the design and engineering firm John Todd Ecological Design Inc. (1989). A research professor emeritus and distinguished lecturer at the University of Vermont, Todd has published books on ecological design, as well as over 200 scientific papers, popular articles and essays.

== Early life and education ==
Todd was born in Hamilton, Ontario, Canada in 1939 and grew up near Hamilton Bay on Lake Ontario. The area near his home included marshes and streams which were being badly damaged by pollution. The writings of Louis Bromfield offered Todd a "marvelous tale of hope" about the possibility of land restoration.

Todd earned his B.Sc. (1961) in agriculture and his M.Sc. (1963) in parasitology and tropical medicine at McGill University in Montreal, Quebec, Canada. He then did doctoral work in marine biology at the University of Michigan, studying fisheries and oceanography. His early professional interest in the behavioral ecology of fish was the basis of his work as an assistant professor of ethology at San Diego State University (1968–1970).

== Career ==
External videos
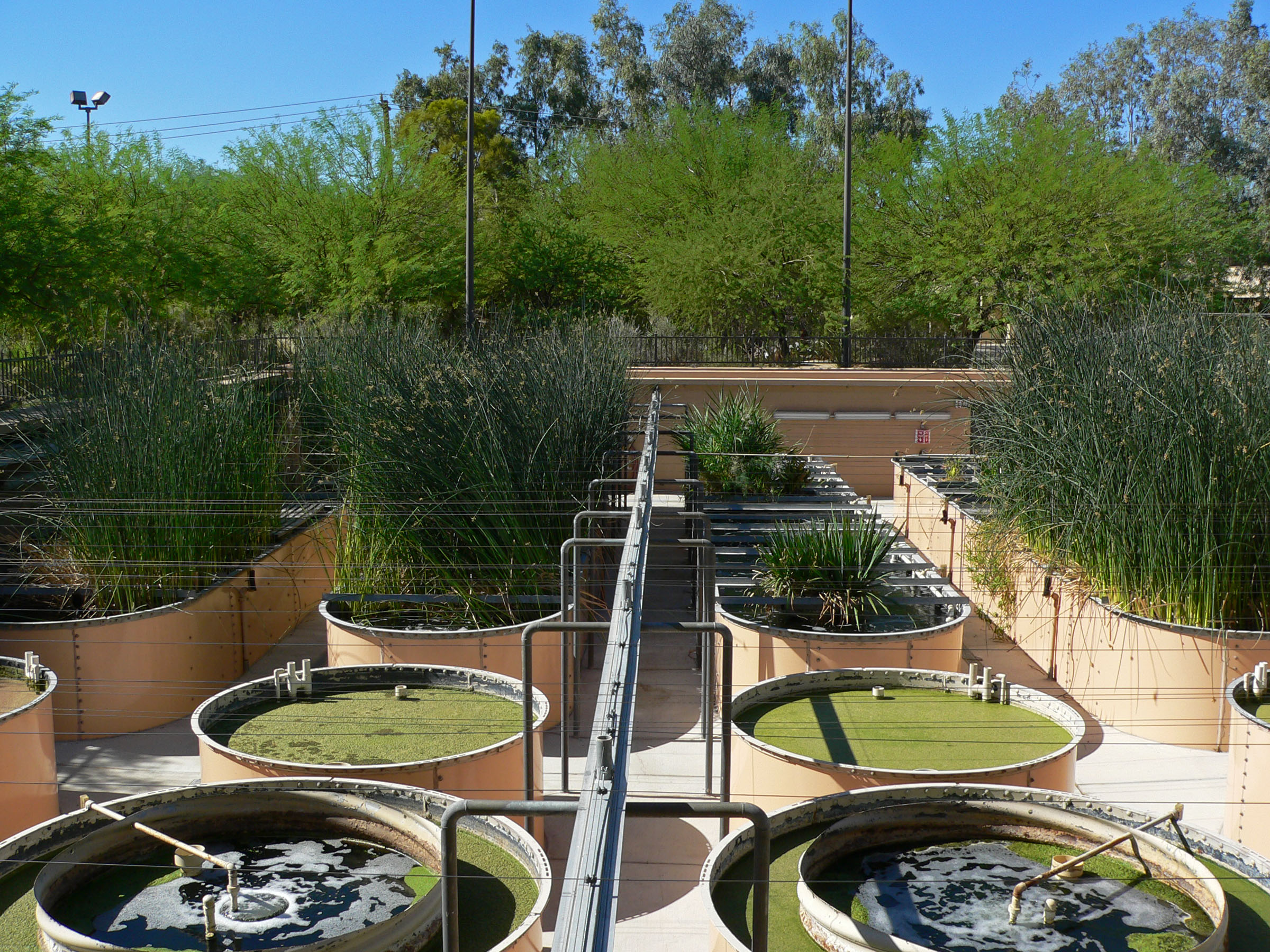
- Ethel M. "Living Machine", 2006
- “The New Alchemists”, 1974 documentary, Dorothy Todd Hénaut, National Film Board of Canada
- Dr. John Todd Ecological Design on Eco Machines, Tao Lee
- The Ecological Design Revolution, John Todd, Bioneers
- Green Eco-Machine, Kristin Alexander

John Todd joined the Woods Hole Oceanographic Institution in Woods Hole, Massachusetts, as an assistant scientist in 1970. At Woods Hole, John Todd began to develop his ideas about how complicated biological food chains worked. An important influence on Todd's thinking was his wife, Nancy Jack Todd, a dancer, writer, editor and activist. In their conversations Nancy wondered if ecological concepts could be applied to address people's needs. She encouraged John Todd to put "a human face" on his research. Since then, the couple have edited and co-written several books, and are co-recipients of a number of awards.

=== New Alchemy Institute ===
In 1969 the Todds and William O. McLarney co-founded the New Alchemy Institute in Cape Cod, Massachusetts to "engage in scientific research in the public interest on ecologically and behaviourally planned agriculture systems and rural land based communities." The institute was a "fusion of technology and counterculture". Its members proposed to apply principles and design strategies from the biological sciences to technology in ways that would be economically and environmentally sustainable. Although the New Alchemy Institute dissolved in 1991, it has been described as "a catalyst of change promoting the development of new ecological design solutions, alternative technologies and methods of ecological food production and waste treatment."

One of the approaches they developed was the concept of bioshelters, "greenhouse-like architectural structures containing ecosystems for various purposes: food for humans, waste purification systems, etc." Wendell Berry wrote admiringly: "The bioshelter idea, then, proposes to make a household on the pattern of an ecosystem, adapted to the local landscape and climate, using local materials... Its governing principle is symbiosis: the food production system heats the house; the fish tanks raise fish, heat the greenhouse, provide irrigation water and fertilizer for the plants." The idea that the wastes created in one part of a system provide valuable resources for another part of the system is fundamental to the design of such sustainable ecosystems.

=== Ocean Arks International ===
In 1981, Todd co-founded the non-profit Ocean Arks International (OAI). The original idea behind Ocean Arks was to build wind-powered vessels capable of carrying ecological materials and support technologies, for use in countries throughout the developing world. Such a vision was beyond the reach of the organization.

Todd began to focus on other concerns relating to water, in particular the development of alternative approaches to conventional waste treatment. He applied ideas from aquaculture and organic agriculture to wastewater. His approach was to identify ecological pathways through which nutrients from waste could be recycled. Waste from one organism could become a food source for subsequent organisms, instead of being discarded as an unusable and toxic by-product.

The first "Solar Aquatics System" (SAS) for wastewater treatment was an experimental pilot at the Sugarbush Ski resort near Warren, Vermont, around 1986.

During the 1990s, Todd was involved in several attempts to start companies for the technologies he envisioned. The personnel, financing and technologies involved in these companies overlap in complicated and confusing ways, with each other and with Ocean Arks International. The term "Living Machines" was filed for registration as a wordmark in 1991, and was registered to Ocean Arks International in 1993 by the United States Patent and Trademark Office.

=== Ecological Engineering Associates, Inc. ===
Ecological Engineering Associates, Inc. (EEA) was founded in Marion, Massachusetts in 1988 as a commercial venture to more effectively promote the work of Ocean Arks International. Susan B. Peterson, previously an employee of OAI, became EEA's first president. Co-founder John Todd preferred not to serve on its board, but was involved as an "ecological designer".

EEA designed and installed a wastewater plant to remediate septage lagoons at Harwich, Massachusetts (see below). Work began in 1988, and the system became operational in 1990. EEA developed several other projects, using transparent water columns for treatment units in its "solar aquatic systems". Patents for processes relating to solar aquatics were filed under the inventor names of John Todd and Barry Silverstein in 1988 and 1991, and granted to EEA. EEA registered the trademark "Solar Aquatic" specifically for waste treatment tanks with transparent water columns.

=== Living Technologies Inc. ===
Todd also co-founded Living Technologies Inc. (LTI), an ecological design, engineering, and construction company, in Burlington, Vermont. It was incorporated as a company on October 26, 1994, in the state of Florida. Some of the personnel involved in Living Technologies, including president Michael Shaw, had connections to OAI and to a prior company called Advanced Greenhouse Systems (AGS) which had been established in 1989 by William Rapp, also in Burlington Vermont. Two patents for Ecological Fluidized Beds (EFB) were filed by John Todd and Michael Shaw in 1993 and 1995. The patents were granted to OAI in 1996 and 1997. EFBs were used in the design of what were increasingly referred to as living machines.

In 1997, Living Technologies Inc. sought a second round of funding, which it obtained from Tom Worrell. In 1998, there was considerable reorganization of the company and its board. Worrell assumed ownership of the company in 1999 and acquired the rights to the original patents for Todd's "Living Machine". As of December 2000, in an out-of-court settlement, Worrell obtained the sole right to use "Living Machine" as a proprietary term. Worrell's company went through a number of name changes and relocations. Worrell Water Technologies, LLC of Charlottesville, Virginia currently holds the registered trademark for the name Living Machine. Worrell Water Technologies has redesigned Todd's original systems and patented a number of new technologies since 2002.

=== John Todd Ecological Design Inc. ===
In 1989, Todd incorporated "John Todd Research and Design" in Falmouth, Massachusetts. It later became "John Todd Ecological Design" (JTED). Through this company, Todd has developed his own later-generation wastewater treatment systems, under the name "Eco-machines". As of 2014, John Todd Ecological Design registered the trademark for the term "Eco-machines". Todd's son, Jonathan Todd, is the president of John Todd Ecological Design.

=== University of Vermont ===
Todd taught at the University of Vermont as a guest lecturer beginning in 1997. He became a research professor in 1999. He is now a research professor emeritus and distinguished lecturer.

== Ecological design ==
Todd and his colleagues were some of the first people to actually create miniature ecosystems, largely self-perpetuating, which applied ecological principles to address human needs. Todd's approach is one of biomimicry, in which a complex natural ecosystem such as a marsh is studied, recreated and adapted. Learning from the natural system, the ecological designer combines micro-organisms, fish, and plants into a functionally complex system that is capable of carrying out tasks such as bioremediation and phytoremediation.

Todd emphasized the importance of establishing an ecosystem with a large number of diverse species and then allowing it to "settle" to a stable state, a process that could take weeks, months, or even years. He recommended seeding the ecosystem with local species, ones that had already demonstrated an ability to withstand conditions in the target environment. He sought to create systems that were capable of self-organizing and displaying emergent properties. Such systems are of necessity complex and cannot be well understood in terms of simple reductionism.

"The most interesting thing I have learned is the ability of living systems—given enough biological diversity—to self-organize, self-design, self-repair, self-replicate, and solve multiple problems for people. These include growing foods, generating fuels, cleaning up pollutants, treating sewage and other wastes, and repairing damaged environments." John Todd, 2017

Todd has applied these ideas in various ways, to create types of applications including "bioshelters" or "arks", "ecological treatment systems" (ETS), "advanced ecologically engineered systems" (AEES) "living machines", and "eco-machines".

=== Water ===
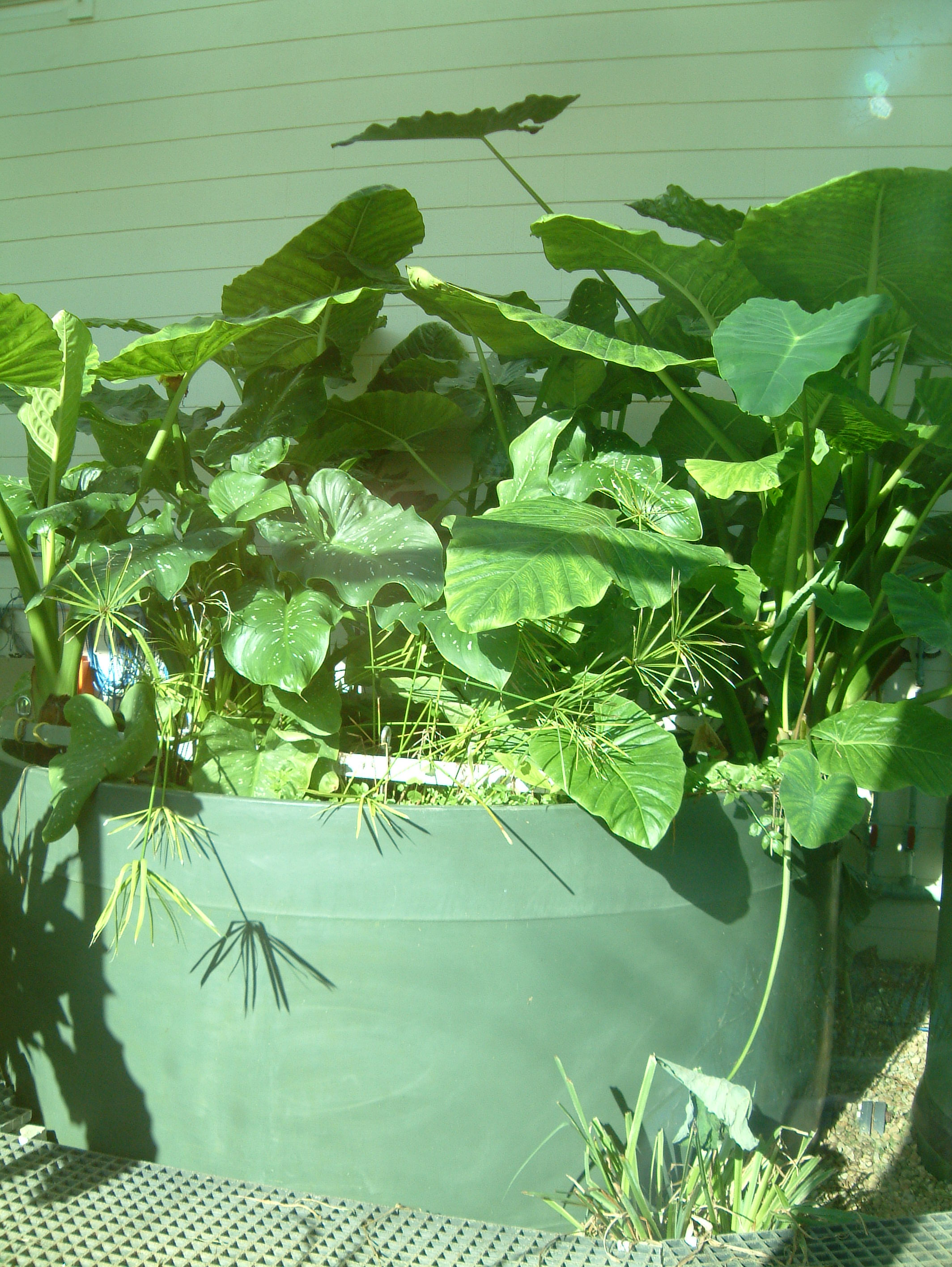
A filter tank from the living machine at Oberlin College

This work has resulted in innovative new approaches to processing wastewater and sewage.

Todd and colleagues developed what they called "living machines". These systems are ecologically engineered technologies developed to restore, conserve, or remediate polluted water, by replicating and accelerating the natural purification processes of streams, ponds and marshes. In practical application, a living machine is a self-contained treatment system designed to treat a specific waste stream using the principles of ecological engineering. It does this by creating diverse communities of bacteria and other microorganisms, algae, plants, trees, snails, fish and other living creatures in a series of tanks. The EPA has concluded that this approach is appropriate to the treatment of municipal and some industrial types of wastewater, and that it can be competitive in cost compared to more conventional systems.

=== Sewage ===
Greenhouse waste treatment plants such as the ones John Todd has developed can yield clean water from sewage. Bacteria consume the organic sewage and turn ammonia into nitrates. The nitrates are used as food for algae and fertilizer for duckweed. Zooplankton and snails consume the algae. Fish eat the zooplankton. Floating plants soak up the leftovers. Bulrushes, cattails, and water hyacinths render the toxins harmless. Trees absorb heavy metals. The byproducts are decorative plants and minnows, both of which are sold. The minnows are sold as bait fish. Aquatic plants, raised in the system's open-air lagoons for sewer treatment, are used in California, Florida, and Mississippi. By enclosing such a system within a greenhouse, it becomes possible to do this in the colder northern climates as well.

== Projects ==
Todd's waste treatment systems have been implemented for sites in at least nine countries, in both the industrialized and developing world. Sites include Australia, Brazil, Canada, Czechoslovakia, England, Hungary, India, Scotland, and the United States. A number of projects have been particularly noteworthy because of the introduction of new concepts or major achievements.

=== The Cape Cod Ark ===
External videos
- “Escape to a Falmouth bioshelter”, 2015, CapeCast

Soon after its founding in 1969, the New Alchemy Institute began to develop its first experimental environment, eventually known as the "Cape Cod Ark", at their headquarters in Falmouth, Massachusetts on Cape Cod. Their goals were to process wastewater and to explore the potential for food production.

A series of solar ponds, each with its own ecosystem, processes wastewater and uses recaptured materials to farm fish and to grow vegetables and fruits. These include papaya trees, eggplants, tomatoes, and herbs. Computers were introduced to monitor and study the processes of remediation, energy use, and food production. Heating and electricity needs were met using renewable energy sources. The system was enclosed within a greenhouse, designed by architects Sean Wellesley-Miller and Day Chahroudi, so that it could operate year-round.

When the New Alchemy Institute dissolved in 1991, the Cape Cod Ark became the property of a private co-housing community. In 1999, it was taken over by Hilde Maingay and Earle Barnhart, two of the co-founders of the New Alchemy Institute. Working with architect Ate Atema, they upgraded the structure and added an energy-efficient house to the original greenhouse. Under their care, the 1800 square feet Ark became a self-sustaining home, supporting humans, plants, fishes and animals year-round. The Cape Cod Ark was still their home as of 2021. Having provided both an experimental testbed for New Alchemy's ideas, and a sustainable home for two of its founding members for over 15 years, the Cape Cod Ark has been referred to as "New Alchemy’s crowning achievement".

=== The Prince Edward Island Ark ===
External videos
- “The Ark for PEI: a video introduction”, October 26, 2016, Confederation Centre of the Arts

In 1974 Todd returned to Canada to design and build "An ARK for P.E.I." at Spry Point, Kings County on Prince Edward Island, with financial support from the federal and provincial governments. Completed by David Bergmark and Ole Hammarlund of Solsearch Architects and the New Alchemy Institute, the Ark gained national attention. It was officially opened by Prime Minister Pierre Trudeau on September 21, 1976.

The Ark was an attempt to re-examine the relationship between people and nature. It also gave the New Alchemists an opportunity to test their ideas in a very cold climate.

"It was an integrated ecological design that was part food-producing greenhouse, part aquaculture fish farm, and part autonomous family home. The whole was wrapped in a simple, yet sophisticated, systems-based structure. Exposed mechanical and plumbing runs, a rock-filled heat sink, and early solar collector panels proudly lined the building, while the dining room overlooked the greenhouse interior through a generous clerestory. It acted as an experimental living laboratory." John Leroux, 2017

Differing expectations about the project caused difficulties. Because the experimental nature of the Ark had been de-emphasized, the technological problems that occurred became particularly embarrassing. Also, many Canadians expected the publicly funded installation to be viewable as a demonstration project for renewable energy and sustainable living. In contrast, the New Alchemists onsite saw it as a private research installation and tried to discourage visitors. In 1977, New Alchemists David Bergmark and Nancy Willis moved out, ending the experiment in sustainable living. The Ark was supervised for two more years by Ken MacKay, a biologist hired by the provincial government's Institute of Man and Resources (IMR), and then closed in 1981.

Nonetheless, the Ark was an important test bed for many of the principles that were later applied to "living machines", as well as a number of trail-blazing and now established green or sustainable technologies: solar orientation, solar collectors, wind energy, thermal energy storage, and composting toilets. Historian Henry Trim emphasizes the Ark's impact on Canadian culture, helping "to introduce Canadians to renewable energy and organic foods as well as pioneering green architecture, aquaponics, and sustainable farming."

Although it was demolished in 2000, the Ark has been called one of "Prince Edward Island’ s two most iconic works of modern architecture". In 2016, it was commemorated in the exhibit Living lightly on the earth: building an Ark for Prince Edward Island, 1974-76 at the Confederation Centre of the Arts in Charlottetown, P.E.I.

=== Harwich, Massachusetts ===
In 1988, the town of Harwich, Massachusetts hosted a four-month pilot of one of Todd's lagoon systems, involving 21 solar aquatic ponds and a constructed marsh. The pilot's success encouraged further involvement with Ecological Engineering Associates. For Todd, it was a "watershed moment", an important proof of concept for the ecological design approach. "After the successful first trials, I knew that it was possible to do good things in bad places; in short, to heal the planet."

By 1990 a full-scale project was being planned for Harwich's Flax Pond, a 15-acre site. The pond suffered from significant contamination due to leachates from a nearby landfill and septage lagoons. Oxygen levels in the water were low and coliform bacteria counts were high. Sediment deposits included high levels of ammonia, up to 300 times the usual levels of phosphorus, and 80 times the usual concentration of iron.

A floating construction called a Pond Restorer was completed in 1992. Using a windmill and solar panels as energy sources, it drew up 100,000 gallons of water per day from the bottom of the pond. The water was sent through a series of columns involving a variety of substrates, bacterial and mineral amendments, freshwater clams, and terrestrial plants. A positive oxygen regime was restored to the bottom of the pond, and sediment depth was significantly reduced by 1995.

In the later 1990s, the design was modified to create an "advanced ecologically engineered system" (AEES). Large reductions in phosphorus, ammonia, and iron occurred between 1999 and 2001. Beginning in June 2001, the original structure was replaced with the first large-scale wastewater application of floating AEES Restorers. Twelve Restorers are arranged across the lagoon, in a pattern designed to promote a serpentine water flow. The installation incorporates 25,000 plants from 25 native species to remediate waste.

=== Findhorn Ecovillage, Moray, Scotland ===
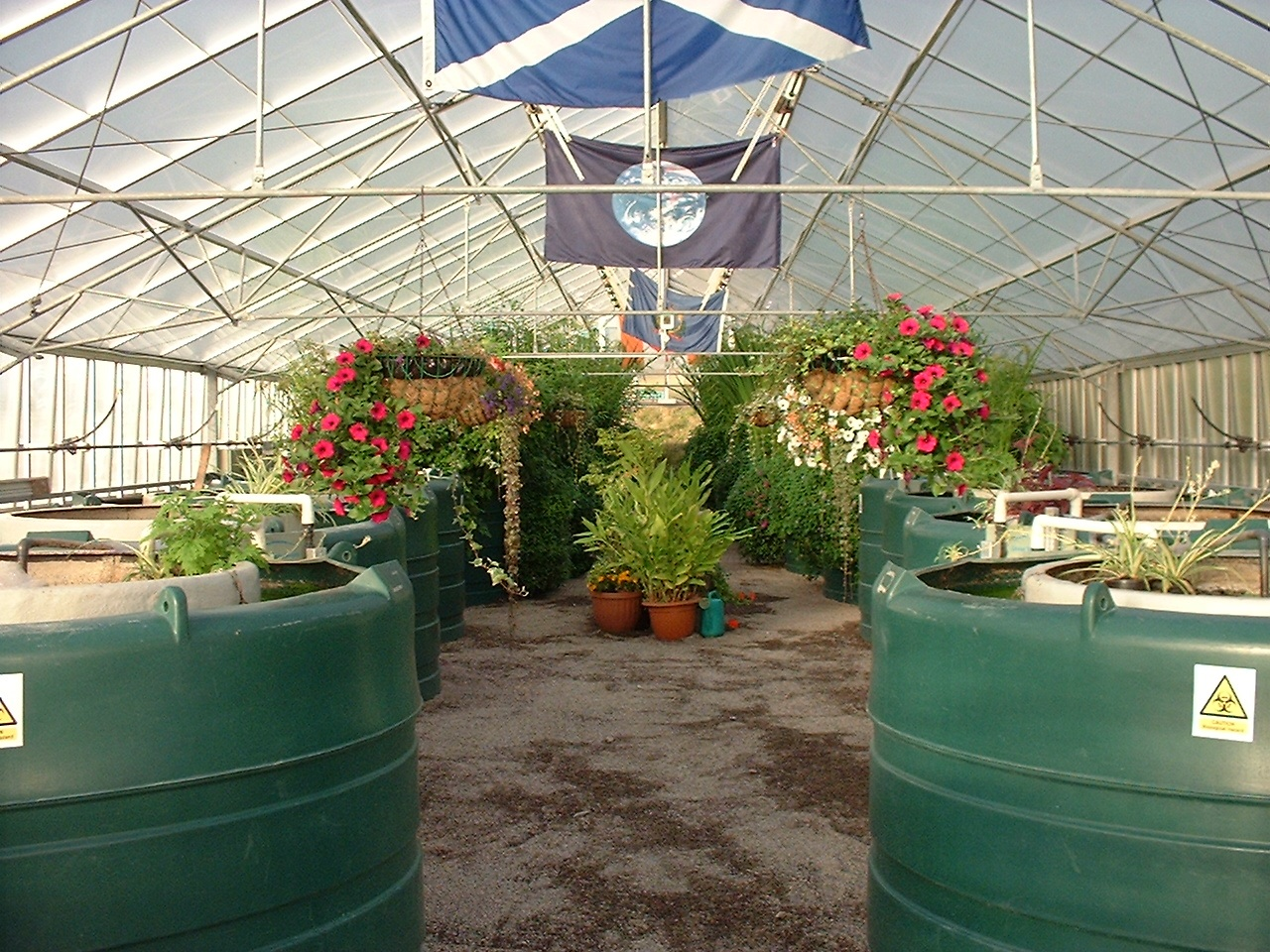
Living Machine, Findhorn Ecovillage, 2006

The first "Living Machine" was created at Findhorn Ecovillage in Moray, Scotland in 1995. For its design, John Todd drew on the work of Käthe Seidel and H.T. Odum. The system had to accommodate wastewater from an ongoing population of about 300 residents, and a seasonally fluctuating population of as many as 10,000 visitors per year. The resulting installation resembles a tropical conservatory garden. Every organism provides food for the next step in the food chain until the cycle is complete.

As a first-generation system, the Findhorn installation has undergone numerous changes. During its first fifteen years of operation it passed regular quality checks from the Scottish Environment Protection Agency (SEPA), and was never out of compliance.

=== South Burlington, Vermont ===
The Vermont Advanced Ecologically Engineered System (AEES) was one of four AEES demonstration projects created with funding from the United States Environmental Protection Agency. The site in Chittenden County, near South Burlington, Vermont, was owned by the Massachusetts Institute for Excellence in Marine and Polymer Sciences, who received the grant. The project involved Living Technologies, Inc. as a subcontractor, and Ocean Arks International, with John Todd as principal investigator.

Project design began in 1994. The main construction was complete by December 1995, when the introduction of biological species began. A steady state of operation was established by May 1996 and continued to the end of 1999. The plant was designed to treat 80,000 gallons from the city's daily wastewater output of 200,000 gallons.

The Vermont AEES included wetlands for the extended aeration and treatment of activated sludge, with an active microbial community as well as plants, invertebrates, and fish. One of the goals of the project was to examine the approach's usefulness in a cold climate. A greenhouse protected the plants. The installation contained two parallel trains of treatment tanks, for experimental comparisons of treatments. During the course of the project, the operators met all but one of the original design goals, and were able to improve on the original design as a result of experimenting with the tank configurations. The area was used as both an experimental and an educational center, and was appreciated for its "uniquely beautiful aesthetic experience".

"This four year long project has demonstrated the ability of the AEES to treat municipal wastewater to tertiary standards in cold climates. The system has been proven to have highly stable treatment performance, and has lower operating and maintenance costs than conventional small treatment systems." David Austin

=== Adam Joseph Lewis Center for Environmental Studies ===
External videos
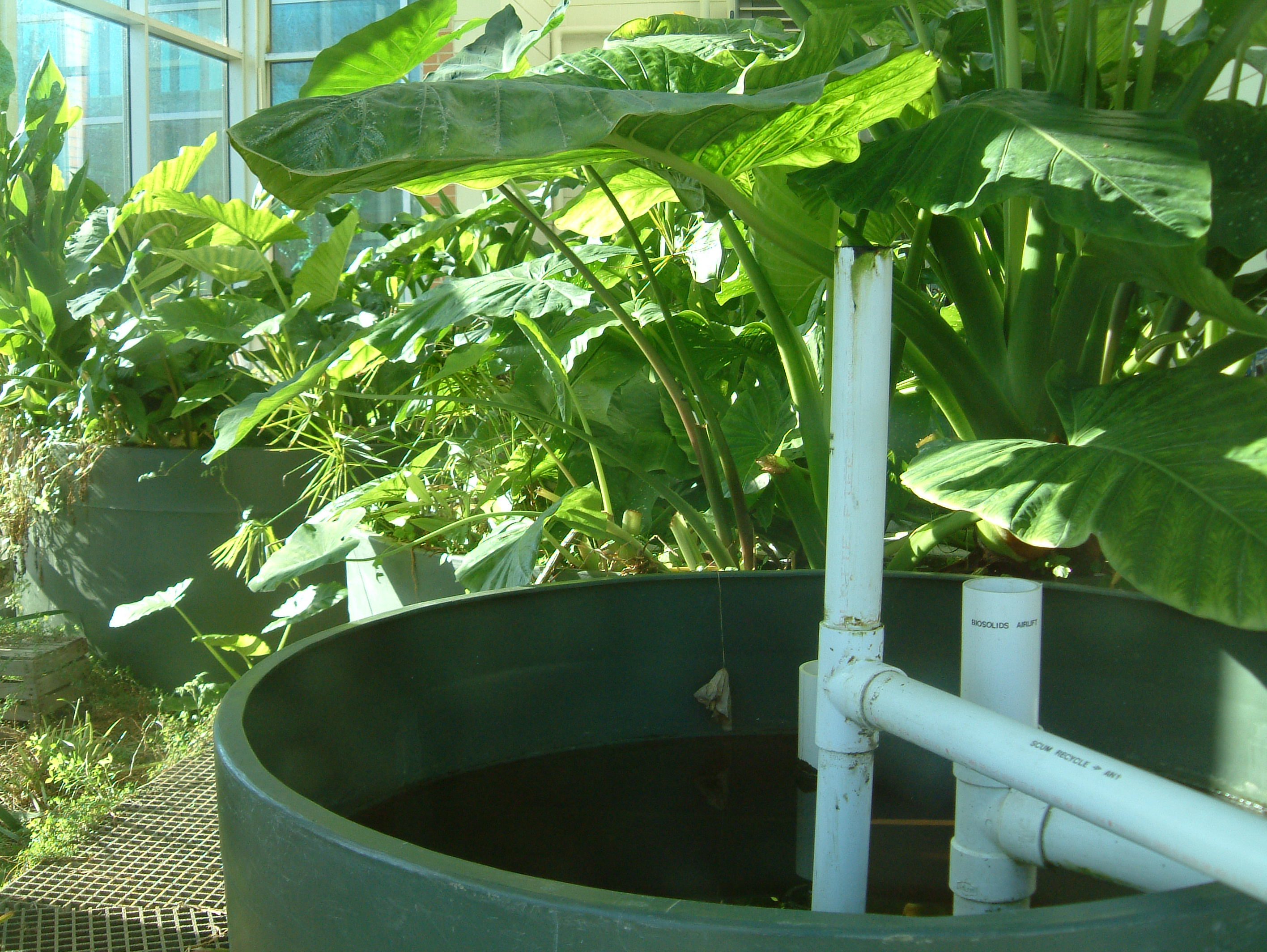
- “The Living Machine”, 2012, Oberlin College

One of Todd's Living Machines was a "vital thread" in the design of the Adam Joseph Lewis Center for Environmental Studies at Oberlin College by David W. Orr in the 1990s. While the Living Machines's primary function was to treat wastewater, it was also intended to be a model of sustainability and ecological design for the teaching of Oberlin students. Oberlin students helped to design, install, and maintain the system.

"The Living Machine® treats wastewater using a system of engineered ecologies that include microbes, plants, snails and insects, and is designed to treat up to 2,000 gallons of the building's wastewater daily in a beautiful, garden-like atmosphere. Upon completion of a water- pressurization system, the treated wastewater will be recycled back through the building for non-potable re-use."

Due to the complexity of the systems involved and issues in communication, a number of design oversights occurred during planning and construction. Limitations in available space and placement of features obstructed wetland flow, a brick wall with no functional purpose shaded some of the tanks, and some of the plants were in areas that had to be traversed by maintainers. Such problems decreased the system's effectiveness, complicated its maintenance, and had to be addressed. Researchers also regretted that a single processing track was built, limiting their ability to establish parallel control and test conditions.

=== Omega Center for Sustainable Living ===
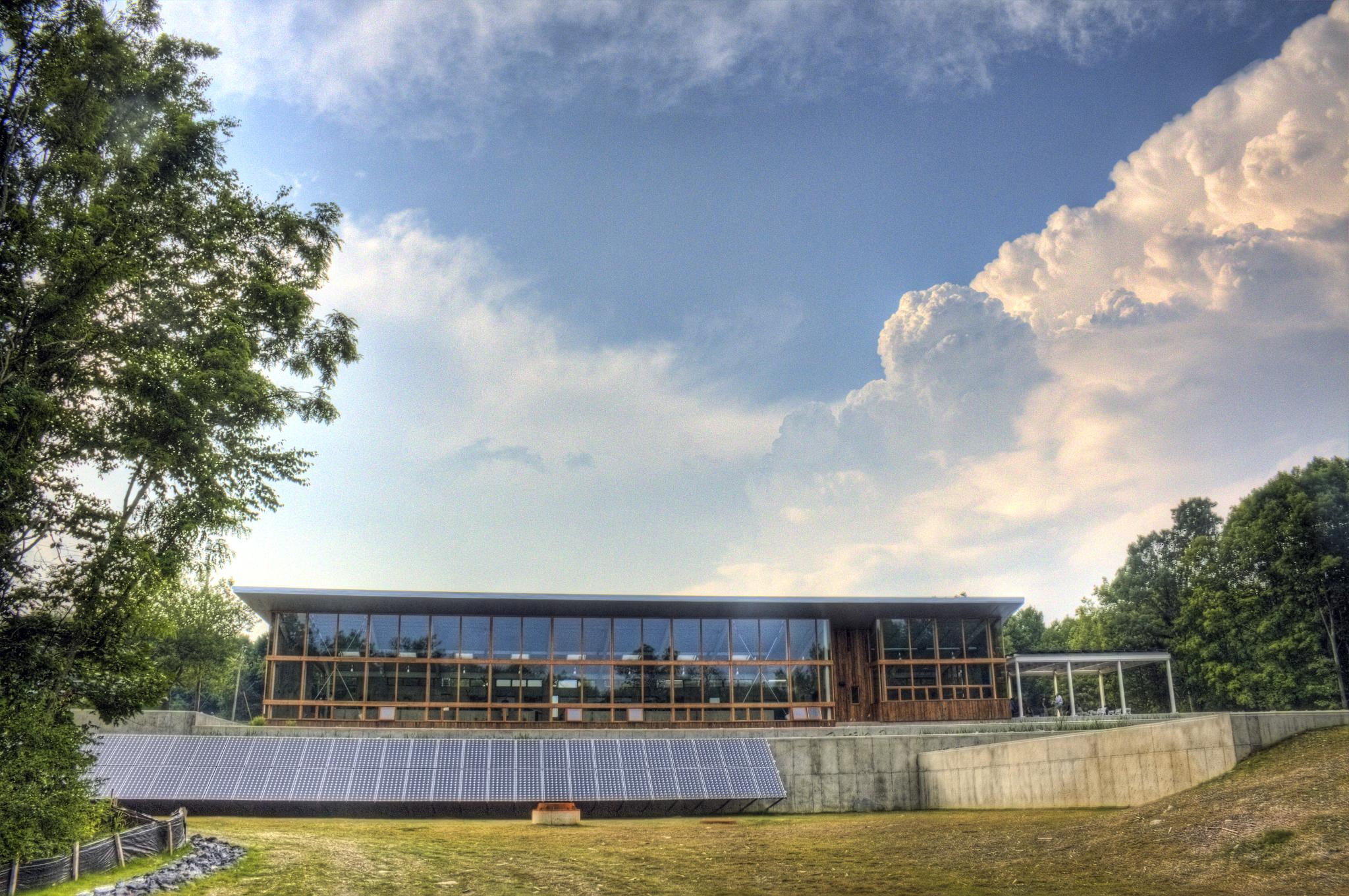
Omega Center for Sustainable Living

The Omega Center for Sustainable Living (OCSL) in Rhinebeck, New York, was opened on June 24, 2009. The building was designed by BNIM Architects, working with John Todd Ecological Design as the ecological architects.

Designed to be self-sustaining and carbon neutral, the building includes an Eco-machine for water reclamation. The Eco-machine's 4,500-square-foot greenhouse and constructed wetland was designed to recycle about 5 million gallons of wastewater per year through the activity of plants, bacteria, algae, snails, and fungi.

In 2010, the Omega Center for Sustainable Living was one of two buildings world-wide to be the first fully certified "living buildings", demonstrably achieving net zero energy usage and net zero wastewater production over a period of a year.

=== George D. Aiken Center, University of Vermont ===
External videos
- “UVM Eco-Machine”, 2013, University of Vermont

As part of the green redesign of the Aiken Center at the University of Vermont, John Todd Ecological Design, Inc. supported the creation of the Aiken Center Eco Machine between 2006 and 2012. Much of the design work for the water treatment plant was done by Matt Beamas, one of Todd's graduate students, who presented his master's thesis on the work in 2010. In addition to treating all of the wastewater from the Aiken Center, the system provides opportunities for ongoing ecological design research at the school. The wastewater system includes three separate trains, for experimental study of the system's use. The building is considered to be "a national model for green renovation of a campus building". It has been awarded LEED Platinum certification.

== Recognition ==
Todd's work has inspired people working on the development of closed ecosystems for living in space, as well as on Earth.

Todd was profiled in Inventing Modern America (2002), published by the Lemelson-MIT Program for Invention and Innovation, in which the story of the development of his innovative ecological waste treatment systems is highlighted.

John Todd was the inaugural winner of the international Buckminster Fuller Challenge in 2008, for his proposal for a Comprehensive Design for a Carbon Neutral World: The Challenge of Appalachia. Todd put forward a program for the reclamation of more than one million acres of damaged land, through soil remediation, forestry, and the development of renewable energy.

Other awards that Todd has received include the Chrysler Award for Innovation in Design in 1994, and on April 22, 1996, an Environmental Merit Award (from the United States Environmental Protection Agency).

In 1998, the Todds received the Bioneers Lifetime Achievement Award. Also in 1998 they were the first couple to receive the Lindbergh Award in recognition of their work in technology and the environment. They are Fellows of the Findhorn Foundation. Todd is a fellow of the Gund Institute for Ecological Economics.

== Books ==
Authored or co-authored by John Todd:

- Todd, John; Todd, Nancy, eds. (1980). The Village as solar ecology : proceedings of the New Alchemy/Threshold Generic Design Conference. East Falmouth, MA: New Alchemy Institute.
- Todd, John; Todd, Nancy Jack (1980). Tomorrow is our permanent address : the search for an ecological science of design as embodied in the bioshelter (1st ed.). New York: Harper & Row. ISBN 978-0060143190.
- Todd, John; Tukel, George (1981). Reinhabiting cities and towns : designing for sustainability. San Francisco, California: Planet Drum Foundation.
- Todd, Nancy Jack; Todd, John (1984). Bioshelters, ocean arks, city farming : ecology as the basis of design. San Francisco: Sierra Club Books. ISBN 978-0871568144.
- Todd, Nancy Jack; Todd, John (1994). From eco-cities to living machines : principles of ecological design. Berkeley, Calif.: North Atlantic Books. ISBN 978-1556431500.
- Todd, John (2019). Healing Earth: An Ecologist's Journey of Innovation and Environmental Stewardship. Berkeley, Calif.: North Atlantic Books. ISBN 978-1623172985.
