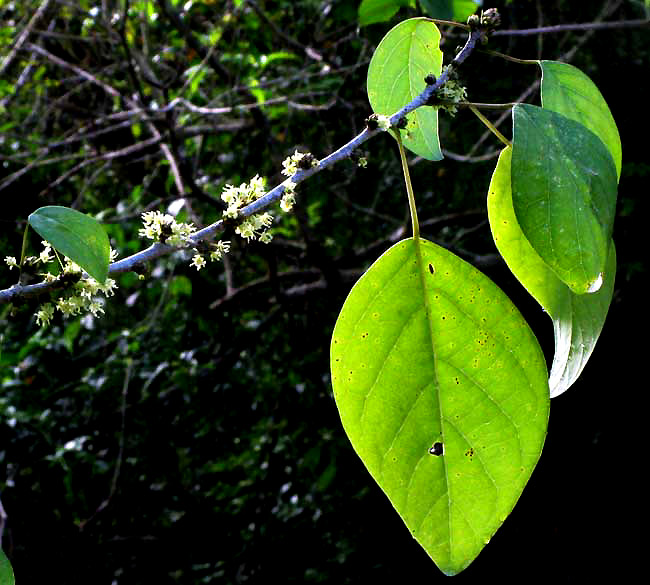
- Astrocasia tremula leafy, flowering branch

Scientific classification
- Kingdom: Plantae
- Clade: Tracheophytes
- Clade: Angiosperms
- Clade: Eudicots
- Clade: Rosids
- Order: Malpighiales
- Family: Phyllanthaceae
- Genus: Astrocasia
- Species: A. tremula

Binomial name
- Astrocasia tremula (Griseb.) G.L.Webster

Synonyms
- Diasperus tremulus (Griseb.) Kuntze; Phyllanthus glabellus Fawc. & Rendle; Phyllanthus tremulus Griseb.; Astrocasia phyllanthoides B.L.Rob. & Millsp.

= Astrocasia tremula =

Species of plant

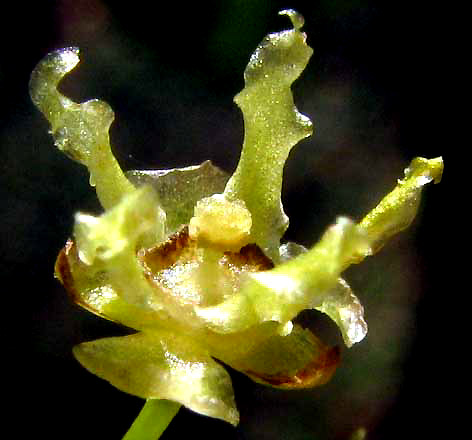
male flower
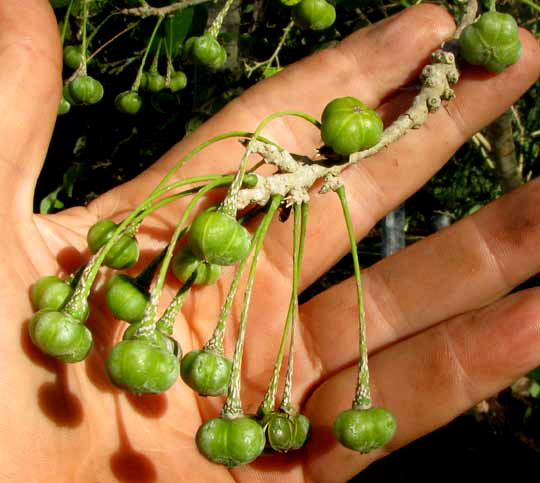
fruiting branch
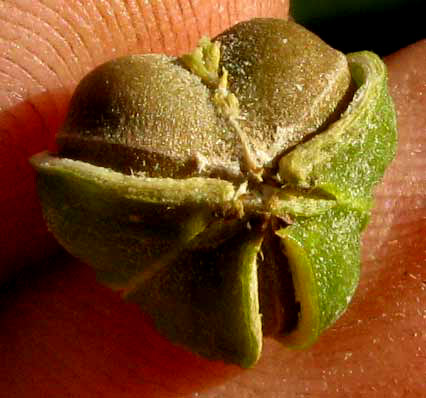
open fruit showing seeds

Astrocasia tremula, with no commonly used English name, is a bush or small tree of the American tropics. It belongs to the mostly tropical family Phyllanthaceae.

== Description ==
Astrocasia tremula displays these noteworthy features:

- As a tree it stands up to 10 m (33 ft) tall. A colorless sap exudes when stems are cut.
- Leaves on long petioles arise single from stems, with generally egg-shaped blades up to 14 cm (5 1/2 in) long and 9 cm (3 1/2 in) wide. Blade margins have no teeth, lobes or indentations.
- Inflorescences appear where leaves attach to the stems and consist of clusters of 1-several flowers.
- Flowers are unisexual -- being either functionally male or functionally female. Individual trees usually bear only male or only female flowers (dioecious), though sometimes they bear both male and female flowers (monoecious), but on different branches. Flowers of both sexes bear 5 sepals and 5 petals, which soon fall off, plus at the base of both male and female parts there's a low, bowl-like "annular disc," associated with nectar production. Male flowers, in clusters more numerous than those with females, have 3-5 stamens with stalk-like filaments fused into a column. The 1-3 female flowers in each cluster possess a single 3-chambered ovary topped with 3 or 4 separate, outward curving styles notched at their tips.
- Fruits are capsules up to 9 mm (1/4 in) across which produce smooth-surfaced, pale seeds. The capsules hang downward when mature.

== Distribution ==
Astrocasia tremula displays a curiously disjunct distribution. In Mexico it is in the western states of Colima, Jalisco and Nayarit, with another Mexican population in all the southeastern states of the Yucatan Peninsula, and extending into contiguous Belize and Guatemala. There is a western Caribbean population in Cuba, Jamaica and the Cayman Islands, and another population in southern Central America in Costa Rica and Panama, extending into northern South America, in Colombia and Venezuela.

It is conjectured that Astrocasia tremula differentiated from an ancestoral Astrocasia in its northern, mostly Mexican distribution area, and that the populations in southern Central America and northern South America result from a displacement occurring during Pleistocene climatic changes.

== Habitat ==
Astrocasia tremula occurs in tropical forests with deciduous leaves, usually on limestone, from sea level to 500 m (1,600 ft) in elevation. In the Yucatan Peninsula it is also reported from coastal dune and mangrove areas, and in tintales where logwood, Haematoxylum campechianum and Haematoxylum calakmulense occur, as well as in zapotales, where sapodilla, Manilkara zapota, is found.

== Taxonomy ==
In 1859, August Grisebach formally described Astrocasia tremula under the name Phyllanthus tremulus. Griesebach based his description on material sent to him by botanists William Purdie and Heinrich Wullschlägel ("Purd., Wullschl.") who collected the species in Jamaica.

=== Etymology ===
The origin of the genus name Astrocasia is unclear. In 1905, when Benjamin Lincoln Robinson and Charles Frederick Millspaugh formally named the genus, they did not give a reason for the name. Their type specimen for the genus was Astrocanthus phyllanthoides (now synonymous with A. tremula), a plant collected by Eduard Seler from Itzimná near Mérida, in Mexico's Yucatán. Since Millspaugh and Loesener named the species phyllanthoides, meaning "like phyllanthus," and species of Phyllanthus often present small, white, star-like flowers with 5 petals strewn among the herbage, plus "star" in Greek is a combining form from ástron meaning "star", and leaves and stems of Cassia species have leaves subdivided into leaflets like our plant, the conceivable etymology of Astrocasia may relate to stars.

A worthy guess as to the origin of the species name tremula is that when August Grisebach formally described Astrocasia tremula under the name Phyllanthus tremulus, he was thinking about trembling leaves, for he remarked that the species was remarkable for the slender petioles of the ".. tremulous lamina," trembling in the wind being something done by leaves with long petioles and broad blades. Moreover, "tremulous" is from the Latin tremulus, meaning "tremulous."
