= Ocean Arks International =

US non-profit organization

- Type: Corporation
- Industry: Entertainment Group (1981–present); Environmental organization
- Founded: 1981; United States
- Founder: John Todd; Nancy Jack Todd
- Headquarters: United States
- Website: www.oceanarksint.org

Ocean Arks is a non-profit research and education organization dedicated to the creation and dissemination of the thinking and the technologies fundamental to a sustainable future. It was founded in 1981 by John Todd and Nancy Jack Todd in the United States. Their work includes the living machines which use phytoremediation to clean water of harmful chemicals.

== Publications ==
- Annals of Earth

== See also ==
- Sustainability
- Biodiversity
- Nature
