= Stolpersteine in Hranice na Moravě =

Memorial installations in Czech Republic

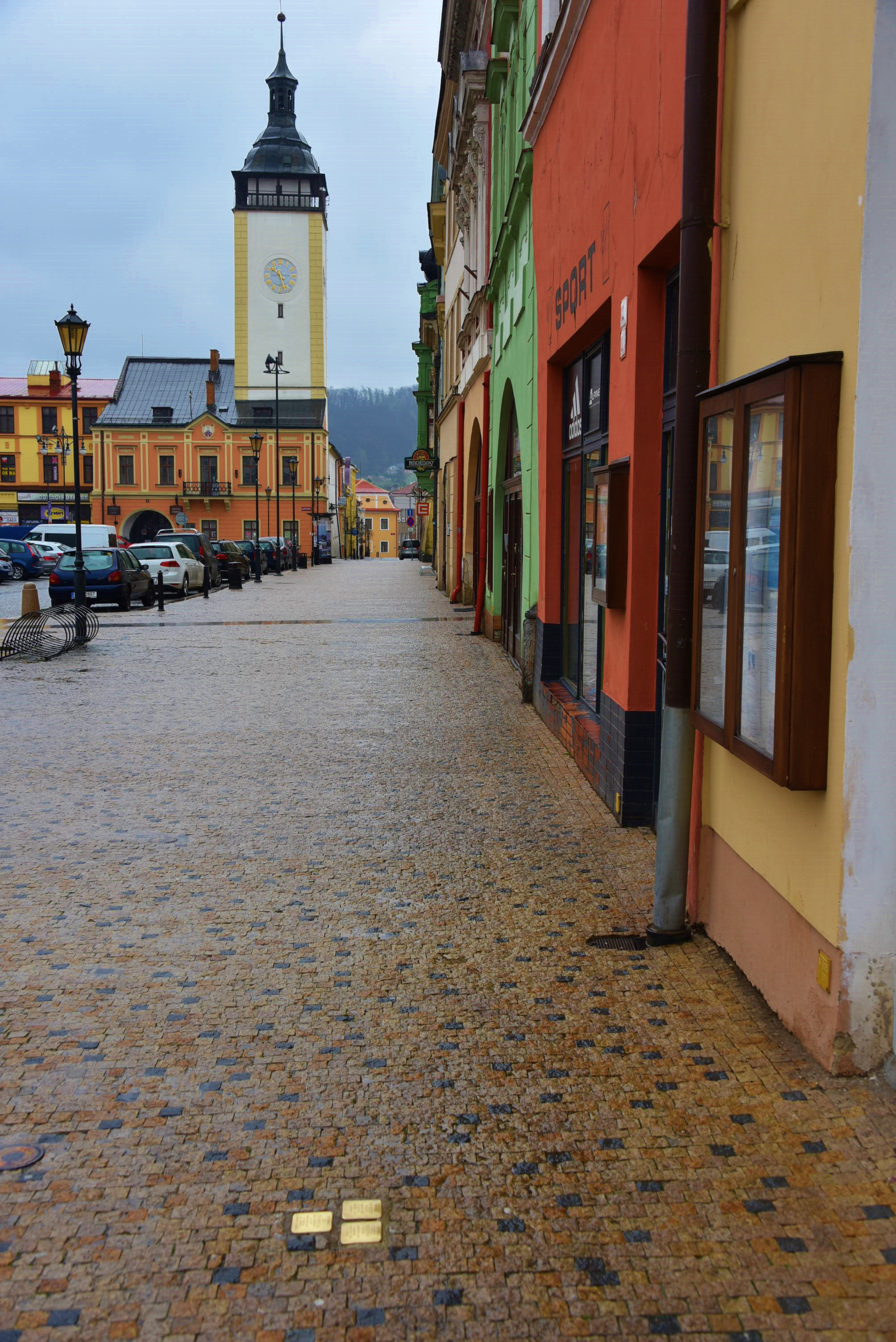
Stolpersteine for Family Gessler

This article lists the Stolpersteine in the town Hranice na Moravě, Czech Republic. Stolpersteine is the German name for stumbling blocks collocated all over Europe by German artist Gunter Demnig. They remember the fate of the Nazi victims being murdered, deported, exiled or driven to suicide.

Generally, the stumbling blocks are posed in front of the building where the victims had their last self-chosen residence. The name of the Stolpersteine in Czech is: Kameny zmizelých, stones of the disappeared.

== History of the Jews in Hranice na Moravě ==
Between 1475 and 1553, the first Jews settled in Hranice. By 1753, 115 families of Jewish faith were already living in the city. In 1864, the synagogue was destroyed and rebuilt. After the end of the Thirty Years' War, the Jewish cemetery was inaugurated. Around 1770, a Jewish school was inaugurated, with Jewish teachers as well as non-Jewish teachers. The medium of instruction was German. In 1857, 802 people of Jewish faith lived in Hranice, but over the years many of them moved to larger cities and settled there. In 1858, Julius Freud, Sigmund Freud's brother, was buried in the Jewish cemetery of Hranice. In 1919, the Jewish school was closed. In 1939, 271 people of Jewish faith lived in Hranice. As of 1940, worship was prohibited in the synagogue, now serving as storage space for furniture. The last rabbi of the congregation, Jacob Rabinowitz, had left the city to go to Palestine in 1937. In 1941, the deportations began. Most Jewish inhabitants were deported to Olomouc on 22 June 1942. From there, some were brought to the East and shot at unknown locations. Others were deported to Theresienstadt concentration camp and from there to Auschwitz, where they were finally murdered. Only 14 of the deportees returned to Hranice after the war. Surviving Lisa Gesslerová speaks of only five survivors who returned to the city. Among the few were the two daughters of the Gessler family, Lída and Lisa Gesslerová. There was a brief revival of the Jewish community and until 1969 a prayer house existed in Hranice. The synagogue was reconstructed in 1996. It serves as a museum and an art gallery.

== Stolpersteine ==
Stone	Inscription	Location	Life and death
	HERE LIVED; MAX GESSLER; BORN 1878; DEPORTED 1942; TO THERESIENSTADT; MURDERED 1944; IN AUSCHWITZ	Masarykovo náměstí 8; 49.548370°N 17.734059°E	Max Gessler was born on 12 February 1878. He ran a textile business in Hranice and was married to Terezie (see below). The couple had two daughters: Ilsa (born 1918, see below) and Lída (born 1922). Max Gessler, his wife and their daughters were deported to Theresienstadt concentration camp from Olomouc on 26 June 1942 by transport AAf. Gesslers transport number was 459. On 18 May 1944, both were deported by transport Eb to Auschwitz concentration camp. Max Gesslers transport number was 2063. There Max Gessler and his wife were murdered by the Nazi regime. Both daughters survived, one source says both survived Bergen-Belsen concentration camp, but another source and the stone says, that Ilsa Gessler was liberated from Theresienstadt.
	HERE LIVED; TEREZIE GESSLEROVÁ; BORN 1884; DEPORTED 1942; TO THERESIENSTADT; MURDERED 1944; IN AUSCHWITZ	Masarykovo náměstí 8; 49.548370°N 17.734059°E	Terezie Gesslerová also called Růžena or Tereza, was born on 11 July 1884. She married Max Gessler (see above), a textile merchant. The couple had two daughters: Ilse (see below) and Lída. Terezie Gesslerová, her husband and their daughters were deported to Theresienstadt concentration camp from Olomouc on 26 June 1942 by transport AAf. Gesslerovás transport numbers was 460. On 18 May 1944, both were deported by transport Eb to Auschwitz concentration camp. Terezie Gesslerovás transport number was 2064. There Terezie Gesslerová and her husband were murdered by the Nazi regime. Both daughters survived, one source says both survived Bergen-Belsen concentration camp, but another source and the stone says, that Ilsa Gessler was liberated from Theresienstadt.
	HERE LIVED; ILSA STEINSBERGOVÁ; NÉE GESSLEROVÁ; BORN 1918; DEPORTED 1942; TO THERESIENSTADT; 1944 TO AUSCHWITZ; LIBERATED IN THERESIENSTADT	Masarykovo náměstí 8; 49.548370°N 17.734059°E	Ilsa Steinsbergová née Gesslerová was born on 11 June 1918. Her parents were Max Gessler and Terezie Gesslerová (see above). She had a younger sister: Lída (born 1922). Ilsa Steinsbergerová, her sister and the parents were deported to Theresienstadt concentration camp from Olomouc on 26 June 1942 by transport AAf. She was a pharmacist, worked in the central pharmacy of Theresienstadt concentration camp. Then she was deported to Auschwitz and later used in Oederan in weapons production. The stone says, that she was liberated in Theresienstadt, another source says, that she and her sister were liberated from Bergen-Belsen concentration camp. She returned tu Hranice, married Robert Steinsberg. The couple has two Daughters: Helena, later married Weil and Hana. later married Horynová. Her parents were murdered in Auschwitz. Ilsa Steinsbersgová and her sister survived; only five Jews returned to Hranice.

== Dates of collocations ==
The Stolpersteine in Hranice na Moravě were collocated by the artist himself on 12 August 2015.

== See also ==
- List of places with Stolpersteine
