= Frankenstein (Sachs) station =

Railway station in Germany

Frankenstein (Sachs)
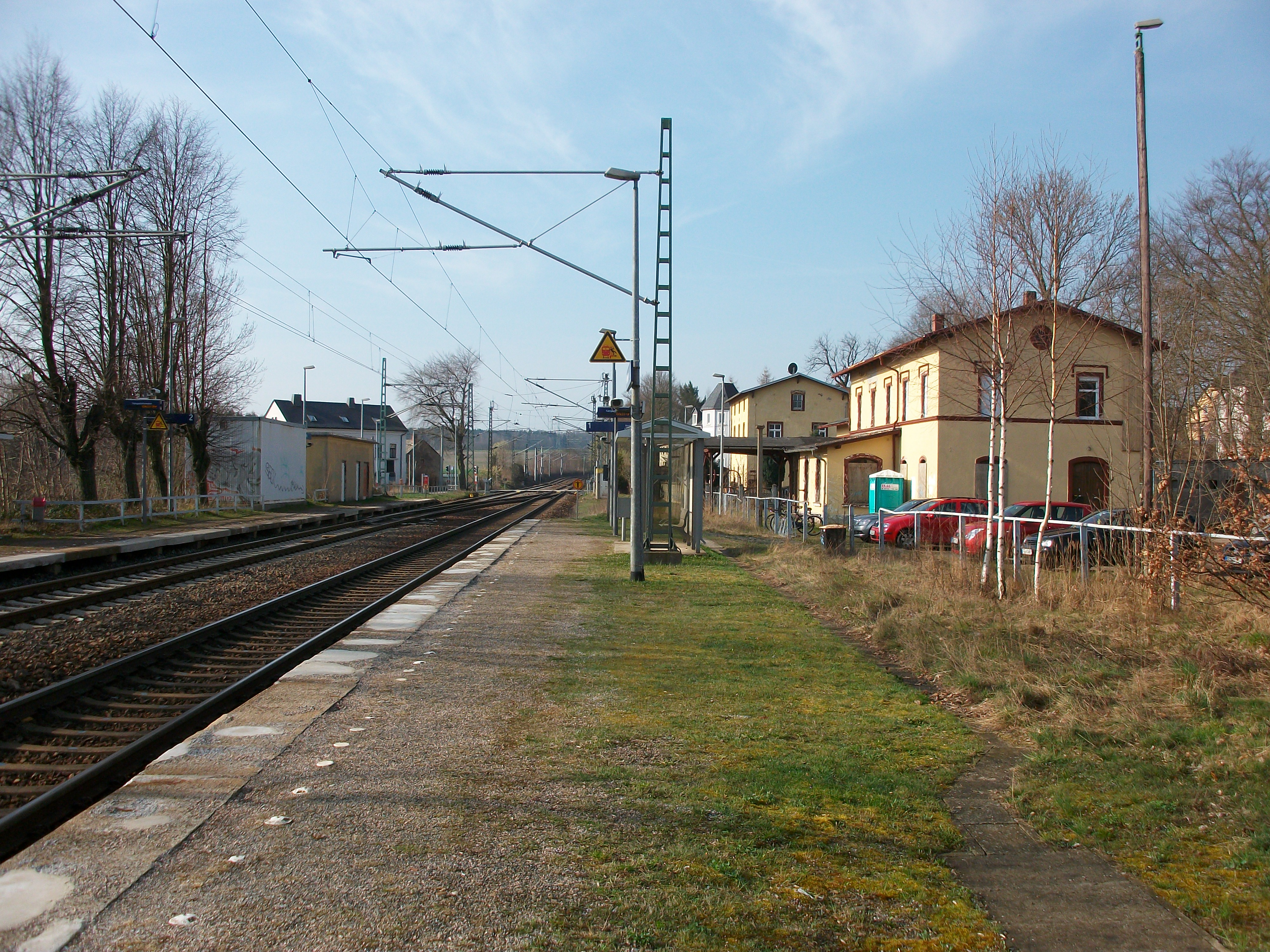
- 2016

General information
- Location: Am Bahnhof 2; 09600 Oberschöna; Saxony; Germany
- Coordinates: 50.9028°N 13.2284°E
- Elevation: 396 m (1,299 ft)
- System: Bf
- Owner: DB Netz
- Operator: DB Station&Service
- Lines: Dresden–Werdau railway (KBS 510)
- Platforms: 2 side platforms
- Tracks: 2
- Train operators: Mitteldeutsche Regiobahn

Construction
- Parking: yes
- Cycle facilities: yes
- Accessible: yes

Other information
- Station code: 1847
- DS100 code: DFRS
- IBNR: 8011556
- Category: 6
- Website: www.bahnhof.de

History
- Opened: 1 March 1869; 157 years ago

Services
Preceding station	Mitteldeutsche Regiobahn	Following station
Oederan towards Zwickau Hbf	RB 30	Kleinschirma towards Dresden Hbf
Location
- Location within Saxony Location within Germany Location within Europe

Frankenstein (Sachs) station is a railway station in Oberschöna, Saxony, Germany. It is named after Frankenstein, which was the nearest settlement when the railway line was built and the station opened.
