= Falkenau =

- Ortsteil of Flöha
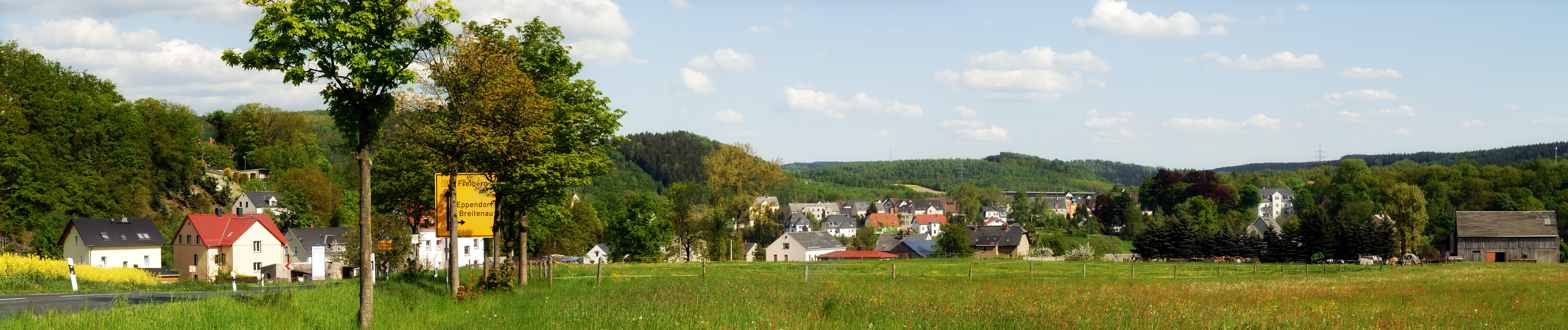
- Falkenau

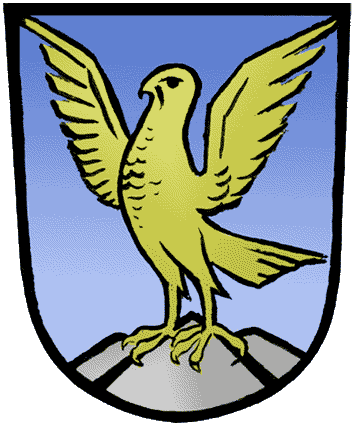
- Coat of arms
- Interactive map of Falkenau
- Location within Germany Location within Saxony
- Coordinates: 50°51′19″N 13°6′57″E
- Country: Germany
- State: Saxony
- District: Mittelsachsen
- Town: Flöha

Area
  - Total: 9.08 km^{2} (3.51 sq mi)
- Elevation: 321 m (1,053 ft)

Population (2006-12-31)
  - Total: 2,040
  - Density: 225/km^{2} (582/sq mi)
- Time zone: UTC+01:00 (CET)
  - Summer (DST): UTC+02:00 (CEST)
- Postal codes: 09557
- Dialling codes: 03726
- Vehicle registration: FG
- Website: Ortschaft Falkenau

Falkenau is a village and a former municipality in the district of Mittelsachsen, in Saxony, Germany. On 1 October 2011, Falkenau joined the town of Flöha.

== Geography ==
=== Location ===
Located in the Ore Mountain Basin, the village of Falkenau stands on the shores of the river Flöha.

Falkenau and its sole district Hetzdorf is located north of Augustusburg, east of Flöha and west of Oederan.

== Etymology ==
The original meaning of the name Falkenau or Falkenawe is unclear, but generally interpreted as "falcon's riparian forest".

== History ==
Until the middle of the 12th century, the region lay in the primeval forest known as the Miriquidi, which covered large parts of what is now southern Saxony and stretched across the ridge of the Ore Mountains to northern Bohemia.

Falkenau was first mentioned as Falkenawe in 1378 in a tax register of the socalled "Castrum Schellenberg" district. But the first settlers probably arrived as early as the late 12th century in the course of the Medieval Ostsiedlung. The settlers founded the village as Waldhufendorf with 15 farms arranged along both sides of the river. The oldest family names of these farmers were Richter (1546), Rudolph (1563), Ruttluff (1563), Schubert (1563), Kunz (1564), Teufel (1566), Wächtler (1567), Hartwig (1580), Förster (1583), Aßmann (1586), Ranfeld (1585), Becker (1585), Schnorr (1589), Naumann (1599), Fintzel (1593), and Barthel (1595).

Small ore mining endeavours were undertaken in the northern forests of Falkenau along the Zechengrundbach with a first phase during the late 16th century and a second one from 1674 till 1842.

Since the beginning of the 19th century and during the 20th century, the village was a small, but supraregional centre of the textile industry with business connections to major cities in Germany and Europe.

=== Population ===
Falkenau had a population of around 140 people during the mid-16th century, with only 20 more in 1688.

Historical population
Year	Pop.	±%
1815	208	—
1834	421	+102.4%
1982	2,153	+411.4%
1983	2,154	+0.0%
1984	2,160	+0.3%
1985	2,135	−1.2%
1986	2,171	+1.7%
1987	2,154	−0.8%
1988	2,139	−0.7%
1989	2,078	−2.9%
1990	2,060	−0.9%
1991	2,025	−1.7%
1992	2,024	−0.0%
1993	2,068	+2.2%
1994	2,062	−0.3%
1995	2,133	+3.4%
1996	2,238	+4.9%
1997	2,272	+1.5%
1998	2,233	−1.7%
1999	2,228	−0.2%
2000	2,218	−0.4%
2001	2,204	−0.6%
2002	2,134	−3.2%
2003	2,127	−0.3%
2004	2,100	−1.3%
2005	2,046	−2.6%
2006	2,040	−0.3%
2007	2,008	−1.6%
2008	1,966	−2.1%
2009	1,957	−0.5%
2010	1,951	−0.3%
2011	1,902	−2.5%
Source: H. Seifert (1938) p. 47; Official Statistical Office of the Free State of Saxony, Date: 30. Juni 2011

In the 19th century, the population of Falkenau grew steadily after the Congress of Vienna in June 1815 and the following decades of early Industrialization in Germany due to the establishment of numerous hydropowered spinning mills and textile manufactories in the village.

Falkenau reached its highest peak of population in the year 1950 with a total of 2921 people. The population has slowly declined since then.

=== Languages ===
- Standard German
- a variety of Upper Saxon German

== Infrastructure ==
=== Roads ===
Falkenau is connected to the Bundestraße 173 (B173). Between Hof and Zwickau, the course of this road largely corresponds to the old Via Imperii. Further on to Dresden, it follows the historic Frankenstraße, which leads eastwards via Chemnitz, Oederan, and Freiberg, towards Upper Lusatia and on to Silesia.

=== Public transport ===
The village has two small train stations and is connected by one bus line to Chemnitz. The upper station Falkenau (Sachs) Süd connects the village to Dresden, Chemnitz, and Freiberg (Dresden–Werdau railway). The lower station Falkenau (Sachs) HP connects to Chemnitz and Olbernhau (Pockau-Lengefeld–Neuhausen railway). Until 1968, the socalled Lößnitz Valley railway branched off to Großwaltersdorf in the neighbouring district of Hetzdorf.

=== Bridges ===
- Hetzdorfer Viaduct, a 43 metres high and 328 metres long former railway bridge with 17 arches was built 1866-1868 as part of the Dresden–Werdau railway. It is now part of a hiking trail.
- "Schulbrücke" (School bridge), an approx. 43 metres long stone bridge with three arches, first built in 1895. It was renewed in 1993/1994 and subsequently repaired after the 2002 European floods.

== Culture and sights ==
In 1722, the post office of Electoral Saxony erected on behalf of Augustus II the Strong a numbered milestone along the historic Frankenstraße. The quarter milestone rests on a low plinth and consists of a rectangular ca 1.7 metres high slab. It only bears the monogram ‘AR’, a post horn, the year of manufacture and, on the narrow side the odd row number "25".

The school, built 1913, was designed by the Saxonian architect Curt Herfurth.

== Sports ==
- TSV 1888 Falkenau (football, table tennis, athletics, volleyball)
- Skiclub Falkenau e. V. (skiing)
- Angelverein Falkenau e. V. (fishing)

Falkenau also has a public outdoor swimming pool inaugurated in 1927. It is located in a quiet spot within the forest west of the village, about 300 metres from Bundestraße 173 (B173) (between Flöha and Oederan, coming from Chemnitz, on the left).

== Notable people ==
=== Sons and daughters of Falkenau ===
- Karl Nendel (* 1933 in Falkenau; † 2019 in Frankfurt (Oder)), engineer in microelectronics

=== Active in Falkenau ===
- Carl Ludwig Beaumont (* 1791, † 3. March 1840 in Falkenau), French soldier in the Napoleon army and entrepreneur in textile industry in Falkenau
- Adolf Gottlieb Fiedler (* 1771 in Dresden, † 2. August 1850), entrepreneur in Saxony and Poland
- Max Hauschild (* 28. December 1804 in Dresden, † 20. July 1877 in Dresden), Saxonian entrepreneur in textile industry and mechanical engineering
- Abraham Kluge († 1654), Captain of a Dragoon Unit during the Thirty Years' War
- Georg Liebermann (* 5. July 1844 in Berlin; † 15. April 1926 in Berlin), German philanthropist and entrepreneur in textile industry and mechanical engineering, brother of the artist Max Liebermann

== Bibliography ==
=== In German ===
- Geographisches Institut, Arbeitsgruppe Heimatforschung (1977). Das mittlere Zschopaugebiet : Ergebnisse der heimatkundlichen Bestandsaufnahme in den Gebieten von Flöha - Augustusburg und Zschopau. Berlin: Akademie-Verlag. pp. 79–82.
- H. Hänsch (2002). 625 Jahre Falkenau. Beiträge zur Geschichte. Falkenau i. Sa.
- H. Seifert (1938). Die Ortsgeschichte des Dorfes Falkenau in Sachsen. Flöha i. Sa.
