= Wielandia elegans =

Scientific classification
- Kingdom: Plantae
- Clade: Tracheophytes
- Clade: Angiosperms
- Clade: Eudicots
- Clade: Rosids
- Order: Malpighiales
- Family: Phyllanthaceae
- Genus: Wielandia
- Species: W. elegans

Binomial name
- Wielandia elegans Baill.

Subspecies
- Wielandia elegans var. perrieri Leandri, 1939

Synonyms
- Savia elegans (Baill.) Müll.Arg.

Species of flowering plant

Wielandia elegans is a species of flowering plants, of the family Phyllanthaceae. It is found on Aldabra, Seychelles, Comoros and Madagascar.
