= Astrocasia =

Scientific classification
- Kingdom: Plantae
- Clade: Tracheophytes
- Clade: Angiosperms
- Clade: Eudicots
- Clade: Rosids
- Order: Malpighiales
- Family: Phyllanthaceae
- Subfamily: Phyllanthoideae
- Tribe: Wielandieae
- Subtribe: Astrocasiinae
- Genus: Astrocasia; B.L.Rob. & Millsp.

Genus of flowering plants

Astrocasia is a plant genus of the family Phyllanthaceae first described as a genus in 1905. It is included in the subtribe Astrocasiinae. It is native to Mesoamerica, northern South America, and the western part of the West Indies. Plants are mostly dioecious, except for Astrocasia diegoae which is monoecious, and some individuals of A. neurocarpa and A. tremula.

Species

1. Astrocasia austinii (Standl.) G.L.Webster - Izabal
2. Astrocasia diegoae J.Jiménez Ram. & Mart.Gord. - Guerrero
3. Astrocasia jacobinensis (Müll.Arg.) G.L.Webster - Bahia, Bolivia
4. Astrocasia neurocarpa (Müll.Arg.) I.M.Johnst. ex Standl. - Oaxaca, Querétaro, San Luis Potosí, Tamaulipas
5. Astrocasia peltata Standl. - Costa Rica, Nayarit, Jalisco
6. Astrocasia tremula (Griseb.) G.L.Webster - Mexico (Jalisco, Veracruz, Yucatán Peninsula), Central America (Belize, Guatemala, Costa Rica, Panama), West Indies (Cayman Is, Jamaica, Cuba), northern South America (Colombia, Venezuela, possibly Brazil)
