= Adolf Gottlieb Fiedler =

German entrepreneur

- Born: 1771; Dresden, Saxony
- Died: 12 August, 1850 (aged 78–79); Dresden
- Occupation: Entrepreneur
- Known for: Cloth production in Saxony and Poland
- Children: Eduard Magnus Fiedler

Adolf Gottlieb (also: Gottlob) Fiedler (1771 – 12 August 1850) was a German entrepreneur in Saxony and Poland.

== Life ==
Born in Dresden as the son of Christian Gottlob Fiedler, Adolf was one of the most important cloth producers of Saxony in the beginning of the 19th century. The operational seat of the company was in Oederan in Saxony. He also had factories in Kalisz and Opatówek (both in Poland), Wegefarth, Wingendorf, Falkenau and Berthelsdorf (all in Saxony). He followed other cloth producers to eastern regions at the time of the German Industrial Revolution because of lower salaries and large loans offered by the Polish government. The German investments in Poland were followed by experienced Saxon and Bohemian specialists to run the factories. An additional reason was local water power.

From 1824 to 1826 Fiedler established one of the biggest cloth mills in Congress Poland. He employed around 600 workers in his Polish mill in Opatówek. The products of Fiedler were well known for their quality and won several international prizes.

Fiedler was also mayor of Oederan. He had one son, Eduard Magnus and he died in Dresden.

== See also ==
- Textile manufacture during the Industrial Revolution
