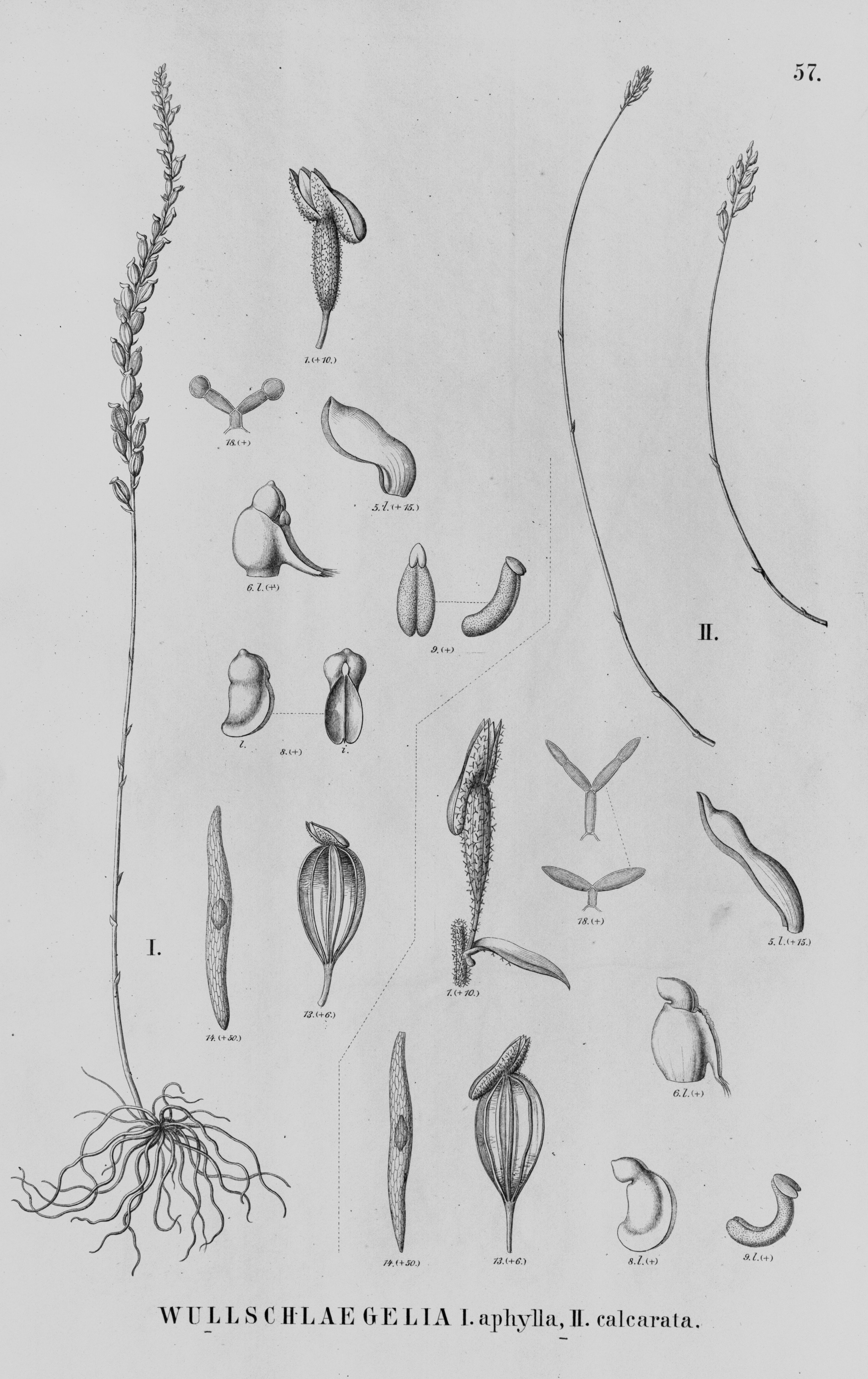
- Wullschlaegelia aphylla (left); Wullschlaegelia calcarata (right) illustration circa 1895

Scientific classification
- Kingdom: Plantae
- Clade: Tracheophytes
- Clade: Angiosperms
- Clade: Monocots
- Order: Asparagales
- Family: Orchidaceae
- Subfamily: Epidendroideae
- Tribe: Wullschlaegelieae; Dressler
- Genus: Wullschlaegelia; Rchb.f.

Type species
- Wullschlaegelia aphylla (Sw.) Rchb.f

= Wullschlaegelia =

Genus of orchids

Wullschlaegelia is a genus of orchids, (family Orchidaceae), consisting of two species in the Caribbean Islands and to much of Latin America from southern Mexico to northern Argentina. These are myco-heterotrophic plants, lacking chlorophyll and subsisting entirely on nutrients obtained from soil fungi. The genus has previously been included in the tribe Calypsoeae, but is now included as the only genus in the tribe Wullschlaegelieae, pending further study.

- Wullschlaegelia aphylla (Sw.) Rchb. - West indies, Mexico, Central America, much of South America
- Wullschlaegelia calcarata Benth. - Central America, West Indies, northern South America

The genus is named for botanist Heinrich Wullschlägel.
