= Berthelsdorf =

- Ortsteil of Herrnhut
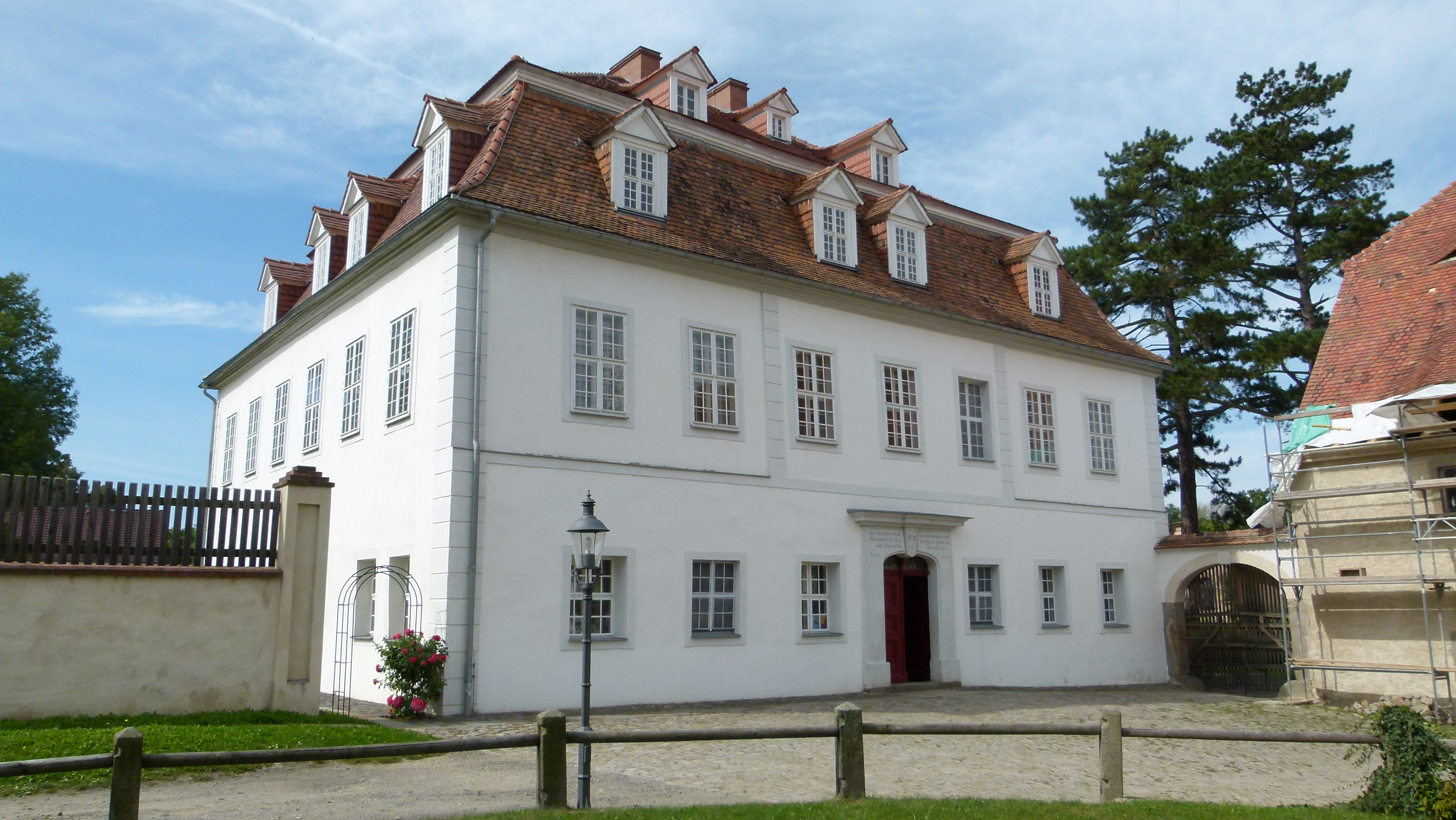
- Castle in Berthelsdorf
- Interactive map of Berthelsdorf
- Location within Germany Location within Saxony
- Coordinates: 51°1′40″N 14°45′30″E
- Country: Germany
- State: Saxony
- District: Görlitz
- Town: Herrnhut

Area
  - Total: 22.24 km^{2} (8.59 sq mi)
- Elevation: 290 m (950 ft)

Population (2011-12-31)
  - Total: 1,630
  - Density: 73.3/km^{2} (190/sq mi)
- Time zone: UTC+01:00 (CET)
  - Summer (DST): UTC+02:00 (CEST)
- Postal codes: 02747
- Dialling codes: 035873
- Website: www.berthelsdorf.de

Berthelsdorf (Upper Sorbian: Batromjecy) is a former municipality in the district of Görlitz, in the southeastern part of Saxony, Germany. On 1 January 2013, it was incorporated into the town of Herrnhut.

== History ==
Berthelsdorf lies close to the borders of the Czech Republic and Poland. Nicolaus Ludwig Count von Zinzendorf, bought the Berthelsdorf estates (Middle and Lower Berthelsdorf) from his grandmother, Henriette Catharina von Gersdorff, in 1722, and Upper Berthelsdorf from his Uncle in 1724. He built his manor house "Bethel" - "House of God" in Middle Berthelsdorf. Soon after buying the estates and calling Johann Andreas Rothe as pastor of the Lutheran parish in Berthelsdorf, he agreed to receive Protestant exiles from the Kuhländchen (de, cs) in Moravia upon his new estate.

The first group arrived in June, 1722, under the leadership of carpenter Christian David. They founded the nearby settlement of Herrnhut on the estate. They were later joined by several hundred other refugees from Habsburg oppression in Bohemia/ Moravia, now the Czech Republic. Under the guidance of Zinzendorf they united to renew the ancient Unitas Fratrum. 13 August 1727, is the date usually considered as the renewal date, which took place in the parish church in Berthelsdorf. From Berthelsdorf and Herrnhut then the "Brüdergemeine", in English, the Moravian Church, spread out across the world, beginning in 1732 with the sending of the first Moravian missionaries.

Zinzendorf also provided sanctuary in Berthelsdorf to persecuted followers of mystic Caspar Schwenckfeld from nearby Silesia. They were forced by the Electoral Saxon government to emigrate to Pennsylvania, and Zinzendorf sent two Moravians to accompany them in 1734–35, in order to scout out the mission possibilities in America.

The former municipality had two subdivisions: Rennersdorf and Berthelsdorf.

== People ==
- Nikolaus Ludwig, Imperial Count von Zinzendorf-Pottendorf (1700, Dresden - 1760)
  - Christian Renatus von Zinzendorf (1727 - 1752), son of Nikolaus Ludwig, born here
- August Gottlieb Spangenberg (1704 - 1792), lived and died here
- Johannes Baptista von Albertini (1769, Neuwied - 1831), lived and died here
- Adolf Gottlieb Fiedler (1771 - 1850), an entrepreneur, made a factory in here
- Peter Latrobe (1795, London - 1863), son of the English Moravian clergyman Christian Ignatius Latrobe, lived and died here
- Heinrich Wullschlägel (1805 - 1864), Russia-born clergy, lived and died here
- Karl Gustav Kreischer (1834 - 1891) (de)
- Oskar Korschelt (1853 - 1940)
- Martin Rade (1857 - 1940) (de)
- Caspar Schwenckfeld (1489-1561), Silesian Reformer, spiritual father of the Schwenkfelders who lived briefly in Berthelsdorf

== See also ==
- Herrnhut
- Großhennersdorf
- The Schwenkfelder Library & Heritage Center
