= Ecological design =

Design approach sensitive to environmental impacts

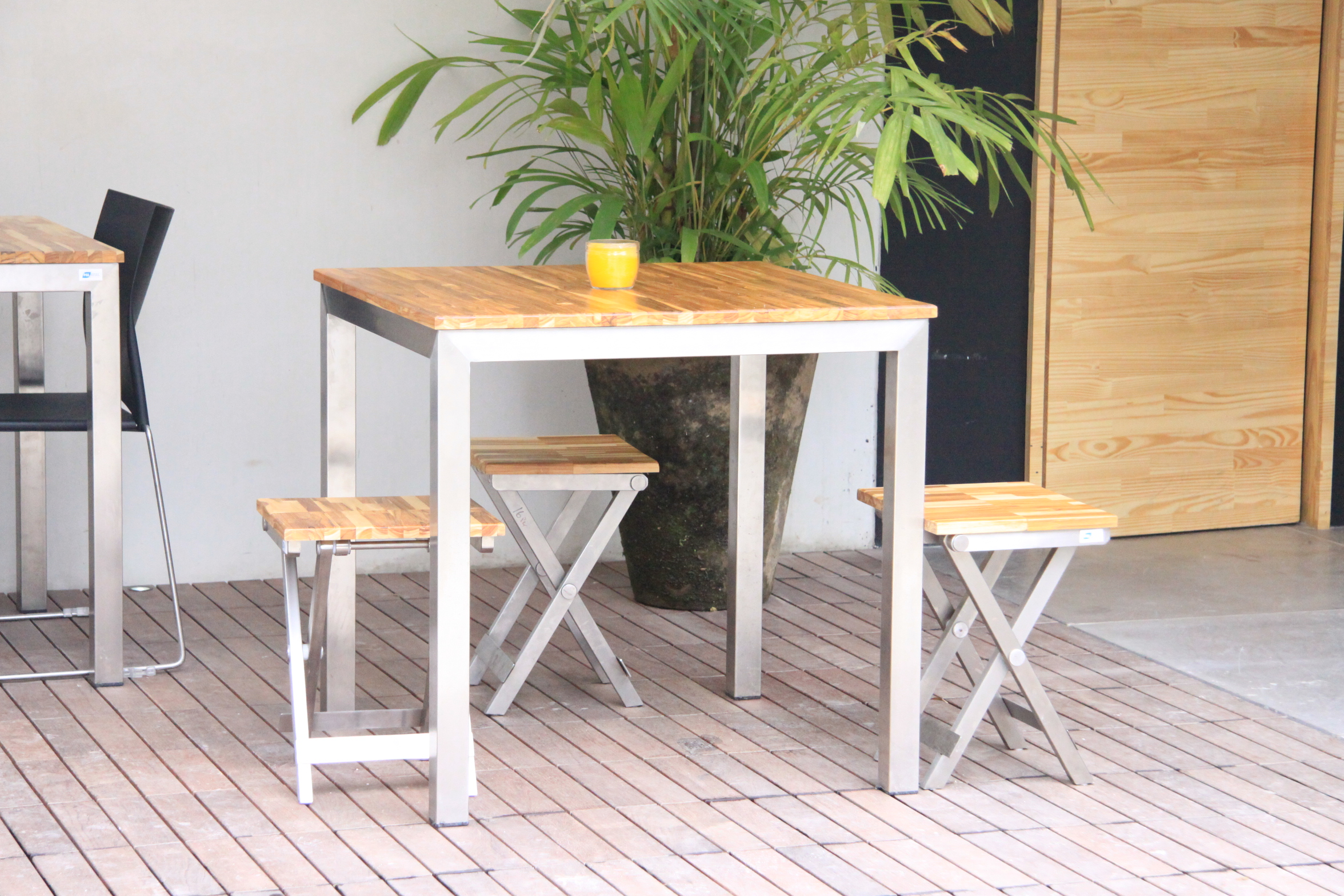
Stainless steel table with FSC Teca wood - Brazil ecodesign

Ecological design or ecodesign is an approach to designing products and services that gives special consideration to the environmental impacts of a product over its entire lifecycle. Sim Van der Ryn and Stuart Cowan define it as "any form of design that minimizes environmentally destructive impacts by integrating itself with living processes." Ecological design can also be defined as the process of integrating environmental considerations into design and development with the aim of reducing environmental impacts of products through their life cycle.

The idea helps connect scattered efforts to address environmental issues in architecture, agriculture, engineering, landscape architecture, and ecological restoration, among others. The term was first used in architecture by Sim Van der Ryn and Stuart Cowan in 1996. The term had been in common use in landscape architecture since the 1960s. In 1993, a conference was held at Arizona State University that included many ecological design leaders, including Ian McHarg. The conference essays were collected in a book edited by George Thompson and Frederick Steiner titled Ecological Design and Planning (1997).

Ecological design was originally conceptualized as the "adding in "of environmental factor to the design process, but later turned to the details of eco-design practice, such as product system or individual product or industry as a whole. With the inclusion of life cycle modeling techniques, ecological design was related to the new interdisciplinary subject of industrial ecology.

== Overview ==
As the whole product's life cycle should be regarded in an integrated perspective, representatives from advanced product design, production, marketing, purchasing, and project management should work together on the Ecodesign of a further developed or new product. Together, they have the best chance to predict the holistic effects of changes of the product and their environmental impact. Considerations of ecological design during product development is a proactive approach to eliminate environmental pollution due to product waste.

An eco-design product may have a cradle-to-cradle life cycle ensuring zero waste is created in the whole process. By mimicking life cycles in nature, eco-design can serve as a concept to achieve a truly circular economy.

Environmental aspects which could be analysed for every stage of the life cycle are:

- Consumption of resources (energy, materials, water or land area)
- Emissions to air, water, and the ground (the Earth) as being relevant for the environment and human health, including noise emissions

Waste (hazardous waste and other waste defined in environmental legislation) is only an intermediate step and the final emissions to the environment (e.g. methane and leaching from landfills) are inventoried. All consumables, materials and parts used in the life cycle phases are accounted for, and all indirect environmental aspects linked to their production.

The environmental aspects of the phases of the life cycle are evaluated according to their environmental impact on the basis of a number of parameters, such as extent of environmental impact, potential for improvement, or potential of change.

According to this ranking the recommended changes are carried out and reviewed after a certain time.

As the impact of design and the design process has evolved, designers have become more aware of their responsibilities. The design of a product unrelated to its sociological, psychological, or ecological surroundings is no longer possible or acceptable in modern society.

With respect to these concepts, online platforms dealing in only Ecodesign products are emerging, with the additional sustainable purpose of eliminating all unnecessary distribution steps between the designer and the final customer.

Another area of ecological design is through designing with urban ecology in mind, similar to conservation biology, but designers take the natural world into account when designing landscapes, buildings. or anything that impacts interactions with wildlife. A such example in architecture is that of green roofs, offices, where these are spaces that nature can interact with the man made environment but also where humans benefit from these design technologies. Another area is with landscape architecture in the creation of natural gardens, and natural landscapes, these allow for natural wildlife to thrive in urban centres.

Multifunctionality increases consumption in both production and use, so products can also be made ecologically intentional through a series of undesign approaches. The core forms of undesign include self-inhibition, exclusion, removal, replacement, restoration, and safeguarding. This sustainability strategy emphasizes the long-term interests of the planet and is related to environmental restoration and technological mindfulness. An example of undesign is digital detox which refers to voluntarily limiting the use of digital media. Terms such as "non-use,""unplugging," and "digital disconnection" are included in the strategic features of some current productivity applications. Application designers effectively distance users from digital interfaces by limiting screen time and reducing smartphone distractions, thereby reducing energy consumption.

== Ecological design issues and the role of designers ==
=== The rise and conceptualization of ecological design ===
Since the Industrial Revolution, design fields have been criticized for employing unsustainable practices. The architect-designer Victor Papanek (1923–1998) suggested that industrial design has murdered by creating new species of permanent garbage and by choosing materials and processes that pollute the air. Papanek states that the designer-planner shares responsibility for nearly all of our products and tools, and hence, nearly all of our environmental mistakes. To address these issues, R. Buckminster Fuller (1895–1983) demonstrated how design could play a central role in identifying and addressing major world problems. Fuller was concerned with the Earth's finite energy resources and natural resources, and how to integrate machine tools into efficient systems of industrial production. He promoted the principle of "ephemeralization", a term he coined himself to do "more with less" and increase technological efficiency. This concept is key in ecological design that works towards sustainability. In 1986, the design theorist Clive Dilnot argued that design must once again become a means of ordering the world rather than merely of shaping products.

Despite rising ecological awareness in the 20th century, unsustainable design practices continued. The 1992 conference "The Agenda 21: The Earth Summit Strategy to Save Our Planet" put forward a proposition that the world is on a path of energy production and consumption that cannot be sustained. The report drew attention to individuals and groups around the world who have a set of principles to develop strategies for change among many aspects of society, including design. More broadly, the conference emphasized that designers must address human issues. These problems included six items: quality of life, efficient use of natural resources, protecting the global commons, managing human settlements, the use of chemicals and the management of human industrial waste, and fostering sustainable economic growth on a global scale.

Though Western society has only recently espoused ecological design principles, indigenous peoples have long coexisted with the environment. Scholars have discussed the importance of acknowledging and learning from Indigenous peoples and cultures to move towards a more sustainable society. Indigenous knowledge is valuable in ecological design as well as other ecological realms such as restoration ecology.

=== Sustainable development issues ===
These concepts of design tie into the concept of sustainable development. The three pillars addressed in sustainable development are: ecological integrity, social equity, and economic security. Gould and Lewis argue in their book Green Gentrification that urban redevelopment and projects have neglected the social equity pillar, resulting in development that focuses on profit and deepens social inequality. One result of this is green or environmental gentrification. This process is often the result of good intentions to clean up an area and provide green amenities, but without setting protections in place for existing residents to ensure they are not forced out by increased property values and influxes of new wealthier residents.

Unhoused persons are one particularly vulnerable affected population of environmental gentrification. Government environmental planning agendas related to green spaces may lead to the displacement and exclusion of unhoused individuals, under a guise of pro-environmental ethics. One example of this type of design is hostile architecture in urban parks. Park benches designed with metal arched bars to prevent a person from laying on the bench restricts who benefits from green space and ecological design.

== Life Cycle Analysis ==
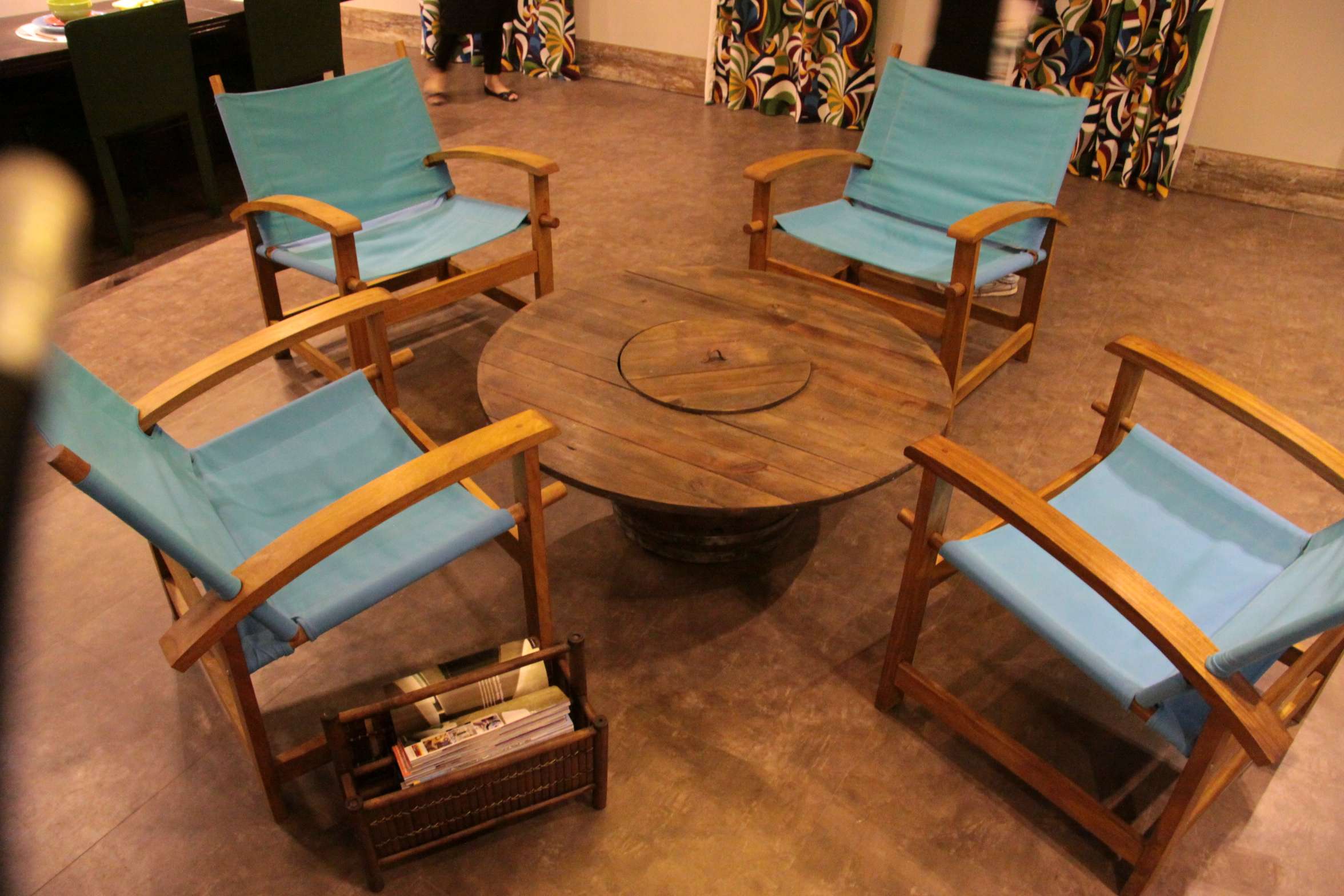
An electric wire reel reused as a center table in a Rio de Janeiro decoration fair. The reuse of materials is a sustainable practice that is rapidly growing among designers in Brazil.

Life Cycle Analysis (LCA) is a tool used to understand the how a product impacts the environment at each stage of its life cycle, from raw input to the end of the products' life cycle. Life Cycle Cost (LCC) is an economic metric that "identifies the minimum cost for each life cycle stage which would be presented in the aspects of material, procedures, usage, end-of-life and transportation." LCA and LCC can be used to identify particular aspects of a product that is particularly environmentally damaging and reduce those impacts. For example, LCA might reveal that the fabrication stage of a product's life cycle is particularly harmful for the environment and switching to a different material can drive emissions down. However, switching material may increase environmental effects later in a products life time; LCA takes into account the whole life cycle of a product and can alert designers to the many impacts of a product, which is why LCA is important.

Some of the factors that LCA takes into account are the costs and emissions of:

- Transportation
- Materials
- Production
- Usage
- End-of-life

End-of-life, or disposal, is an important aspect of LCA as waste management is a global issue, with trash found everywhere around the world from the ocean to within organisms. A framework was developed to assess sustainability of waste sites titled EcoSWaD, Ecological Sustainability of Waste Disposal Sites. The model focuses on five major concerns: (1) location suitability, (2) operational sustainability, (3) environmental sustainability, (4) socioeconomic sustainability, and (5) site capacity sustainability. This framework was developed in 2021, as such most established waste disposal sites do not take these factors into consideration. Waste facilities such as dumps and incinerators are disproportionately placed in areas with low education and income levels, burdening these vulnerable populations with pollution and exposure to hazardous materials. For example, legislation in the United States, such as the Cerrell Report, has encouraged these types of classist and racist processes for siting incinerators. Internationally, there has been a global 'race to the bottom' in which polluting industries move to areas with fewer restrictions and regulations on emissions, usually in developing countries, disproportionately exposing vulnerable and impoverished populations to environmental threats. These factors make LCA and sustainable waste sites important on a global scale.

== Urban Ecological Design ==
Related to ecological urbanism, Urban Ecological Design integrates aesthetic, social, and ecological concerns into an urban design framework that seeks to increase ecological functioning, sustainably generate and consume resources, and create resilient built environments and the infrastructure to maintain them. Urban ecological design is inherently interdisciplinary: it integrates multiple academic and professional fields including environmental studies, sociology, justice studies, urban ecology, landscape ecology, urban planning, architecture, and landscape architecture. Urban ecological design aims to solve issues related to multiple large-scale trends including the growth of urban areas, climate change, and biodiversity loss. Urban ecological design has been described as a "process model" contrasted to a normative approach that outlines principles of design. Urban ecological design blends a multitude of frameworks and approaches to create solutions to these issues by improving Urban resilience, sustainable use and management of resources, and integrating ecological processes into the urban landscape.

== Applications in design ==
EcoMaterials, such as the use of local raw materials, are less costly and reduce the environmental costs of shipping, fuel consumption, and CO_{2} emissions generated from transportation. Certified green building materials, such as wood from sustainably managed forest plantations, with accreditations from companies such as the Forest Stewardship Council (FSC), or the Pan-European Forest Certification Council (PEFCC), can be used.

Several other types of components and materials can be used in sustainable objects and buildings. Recyclable and recycled materials are commonly used in construction, but it is important that they don't generate any waste during manufacture or after their life cycle ends. Reclaimed materials such as timber at a construction site or junkyard can be given a second life by reusing them as support beams in a new building or as furniture. Stones from an excavation can be used in a retaining wall. The reuse of these items means that less energy is consumed in making new products and a new natural aesthetic quality is achieved.

=== Architecture ===
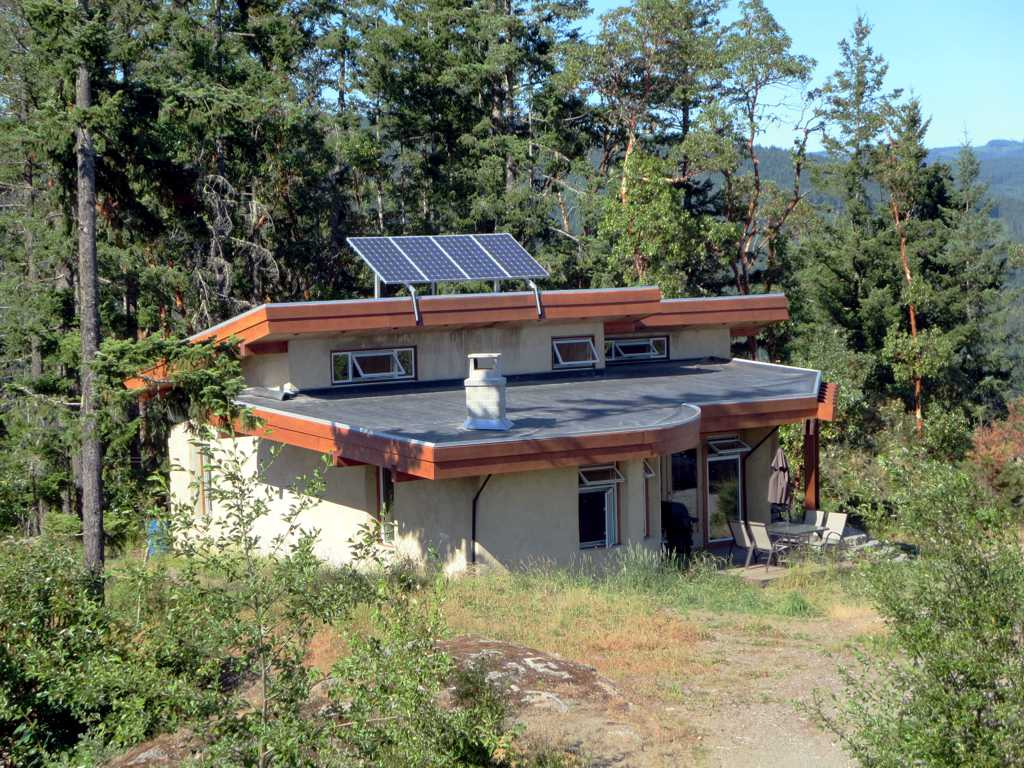
Stoltz Bluff Eco-Retreat: an off-grid home on Vancouver Island, Canada

Off-grid homes only use clean electric power. They are completely separated and disconnected from the conventional electricity grid and receive their power supply by harnessing active or passive energy systems. Off-grid homes are also not served by other publicly or privately managed utilities, such as water and gas in addition to electricity.

=== Art ===
Increased applications of ecological design have gone along with the rise of environmental art. Recycling has been used in art since the early part of the 20th century, when cubist artist Pablo Picasso (1881–1973) and Georges Braque (1882–1963) created collages from newsprints, packaging and other found materials. Contemporary artists have also embraced sustainability, both in materials and artistic content. One modern artist who embraces the reuse of materials is Bob Johnson, creator of River Cubes. Johnson promotes "artful trash management" by creating sculptures from garbage and scraps found in rivers. Garbage is collected, then compressed into a cube that represents the place and people it came from.

=== Clothing ===
There are some clothing companies that are using several ecological design methods to change the future of the textile industry into a more environmentally friendly one. Some approaches include recycling used clothing to minimize the use of raw resources, using biodegradable textile materials to reduce the lasting impact on the environment, and using plant dyes instead of poisonous chemicals to improve the appearance and impact of fabric.

=== Decorating ===
The same principle can be used inside the home, where found objects are now displayed with pride and collecting certain objects and materials to furnish a home is now admired rather than looked down upon. Take for example the electric wire reel reused as a center table.

There is a huge demand in Western countries to decorate homes in a "green" style. A lot of effort is placed into recycled product design and the creation of a natural look. This ideal is also a part of developing countries, although their use of recycled and natural products is often based in necessity and wanting to get maximum use out of materials. The focus on self-regulation and personal lifestyle changes (including decorating as well as clothing and other consumer choices) has shifted questions of social responsibility away from government and corporations and onto the individual.

Biophilic design is a concept used within the building industry to increase occupant connectivity to the natural environment through the use of direct nature, indirect nature, and space and place conditions.

== Active systems ==
These systems use the principle of harnessing the power generated from renewable and inexhaustible sources of energy, for example; solar, wind, thermal, biomass, geothermal, and hydropower energy.

Solar power is a widely known and used renewable energy source. An increase in technology has allowed solar power to be used in a wide variety of applications. Two types of solar panels generate heat into electricity. Thermal solar panels reduce or eliminate the consumption of gas and diesel, and reduce CO_{2} emissions. Photovoltaic panels convert solar radiation into an electric current which can power any appliance. This is a more complex technology and is generally more expensive to manufacture than thermal panels.

Biomass is the energy source created from organic materials generated through a forced or spontaneous biological process.

Geothermal energy is obtained by harnessing heat from the ground. This type of energy can be used to heat and cool homes. It eliminates dependence on external energy and generates minimum waste. It is also hidden from view as it is placed underground, making it more aesthetically pleasing and easier to incorporate in a design.

Wind turbines are a useful application for areas without immediate conventional power sources, e.g., rural areas with schools and hospitals that need more power. Wind turbines can provide up to 30% of the energy consumed by a household but they are subject to regulations and technical specifications, such as the maximum distance at which the facility is located from the place of consumption and the power required and permitted for each property.

Water recycling systems such as rainwater tanks that harvest water for multiple purposes. Reusing grey water generated by households are a useful way of not wasting drinking water.

Hydropower, also known as water power, is the use of falling or fast-running water to produce electricity or to power machines. Hydropower is an attractive alternative to fossil fuels as it does not directly produce carbon dioxide or other atmospheric pollutants and it provides a relatively consistent source of power.

== Passive systems ==
Buildings that integrate passive energy systems (bioclimatic buildings) are heated using non-mechanical methods, thereby optimizing natural resources.

Passive daylighting involves the positioning and location of a building to allow for and make use of sunlight throughout the whole year. By using the Sun's rays, thermal mass is stored in the building materials such as concrete and can generate enough heat for a room.

Green roofs are roofs that are partially or completely covered with plants or other vegetation. Green roofs are passive systems in that they create insulation that helps regulate the building's temperature. They also retain water, providing a water recycling system, and can provide soundproofing.

Natural/Passive ventilation uses architectural form and orientation to promote airflow and reduce reliance on mechanical air-conditioning systems. Well-designed openings, atria, and cross-ventilation paths allow fresh air to enter and warm air to escape through pressure and temperature differences, maintaining indoor comfort without additional energy input.

== History ==
- 1969 Ian McHarg, in his book Design with Nature, popularized a system of analyzing the layers of a site in order to compile a complete understanding of the qualitative attributes of a place. McHarg gave every qualitative aspect of the site a layer, such as the history, hydrology, topography, vegetation, etc. This system became the foundation of today's Geographic Information Systems (GIS), a ubiquitous tool used in the practice of ecological landscape design. Lewis Mumford's introduction to the 1969 edition of Design with Nature refers to the promise of "ecology and ecological design."
- 1978 Permaculture. Bill Mollison and David Holmgren coin the phrase for a system of designing regenerative human ecosystems. (Founded in the work of Fukuoka, Yeoman, Smith, etc..
- 1994 David Orr, in his book Earth in Mind: On Education, Environment, and the Human Prospect, compiled a series of essays on "ecological design intelligence" and its power to create healthy, durable, resilient, just, and prosperous communities.
- 1994 Canadian biologists John Todd and Nancy Jack Todd, in their book From Eco-Cities to Living Machines, describe the precepts of ecological design.
- 2000 Ecosa Institute begins offering an Ecological Design Certificate, teaching designers to design with nature.
- 2004 Fritjof Capra, in his book The Hidden Connections: A Science for Sustainable Living, wrote this primer on the science of living systems and considers the application of new thinking by life scientists to our understanding of social organization.
- 2004 K. Ausebel compiled personal stories of the world's most innovative ecological designers in Nature's Operating Instructions.

== Ecodesign research ==
Ecodesign research focuses primarily on barriers to implementation, ecodesign tools and methods, and the intersection of ecodesign with other research disciplines.

Several review articles provide an overview of the evolution and current state of ecodesign research:

== See also ==
- Biophilic design
- Circles of Sustainability
- Ecological restoration
- Eco-innovation
- Energy-efficient landscape design
- Environmental design
- Environmental graphic design
- European Ecodesign Directive 2009/125/EC
- Green building
- Green roof
- Permaculture
- Principles of Intelligent Urbanism
- Sustainability
  - Sustainable development
  - Sustainable design
  - Sustainable landscape architecture
- Terreform ONE

== Bibliography ==
- Lacoste, R., Robiolle, M., Vital, X., (2011), "Ecodesign of electronic devices", DUNOD, France
- McAloone, T. C. & Bey, N. (2009), Environmental improvement through product development - a guide, Danish EPA, Copenhagen Denmark, ISBN 978-87-7052-950-1, 46 pages
- Lindahl, M.: Designer's utilization of DfE methods. Proceedings of the 1st International Workshop on "Sustainable Consumption", 2003. Tokyo, Japan, The Society of Non-Traditional Technology (SNTT) and Research Center for Life Cycle Assessment (AIST).
- Wimmer W., Züst R., Lee K.-M. (2004): Ecodesign Implementation – A Systematic Guidance on Integrating Environmental Considerations into Product Development, Dordrecht, Springer
- Charter, M./ Tischner, U. (2001): Sustainable Solutions. Developing Products and Services for the Future. Sheffield: Greenleaf
- ISO TC 207/WG3
- ISO TR 14062
- The Journal of Design History: Environmental conscious design and inverse manufacturing, 2005. Eco Design 2005, 4th International Symposium
- The Design Journal: Vol 13, Number 1, March 2010 - Design is the problem: The future of Design must be sustainable, N. Shedroff.
- "Eco Deco", S. Walton
- "Small ECO Houses - Living Green in Style", C. Paredes Benitez, A. Sanchez Vidiella
