= Heinrich Wullschlägel =

Heinrich Rudolf Wullschlägel (1 February 1805, Sarepta, Saratov Governorate, Russian Empire (now part of Volgograd) – 29 March 1864, Berthelsdorf, Germany) was born in the Moravian Colony of Sarepta in Russia and was a Dutch-German bishop, botanist and translator.

Wullschlägel received his primary education in Niesky, Saxony, his theological instruction in Gnadenfeld, Silesia, spent the years 1844-47 on Antigua, 1847-49 in Jamaica, and 1849-1855 in Paramaribo, Surinam as head of the Mission of the Unitas Fratrum - The Moravian Church.

Wullschlägel made extensive botanical collections, which from some botanists are regarded as exsiccata-like with the title Plantae ex insulis Antigua et Jamaica and wrote a dictionary of the Creole language there, as well as on a trip to the Mosquito Coast. He entered the directorate of the Moravian Church in Berthelsdorf near Herrnhut in 1855 and became its bishop in 1857.

- Wullschlaegelia Reichenbach fil., a genus of two species of leafless orchids bears his name.

== Some species named after him ==
- Tabernaemontana wullschlaegelii
- Anthurium wullschlaegelii
- Philodendron wullschlaegelii
- Somphoxylon wullschlaegelii
- Lepanthes wullschlaegelii
- Paspalum wullschlaegelii
- Psychotria wullschlaegelii
- Pilea wullschlaegelii

== Sources ==
- Urban, Ignaz, Notae Biographicae, Symbolae Antillanae 3:145,1902.

== Bibliography ==
- Complete bibliography - WorldCat
