= Living Machine =

Form of ecological wastewater treatment

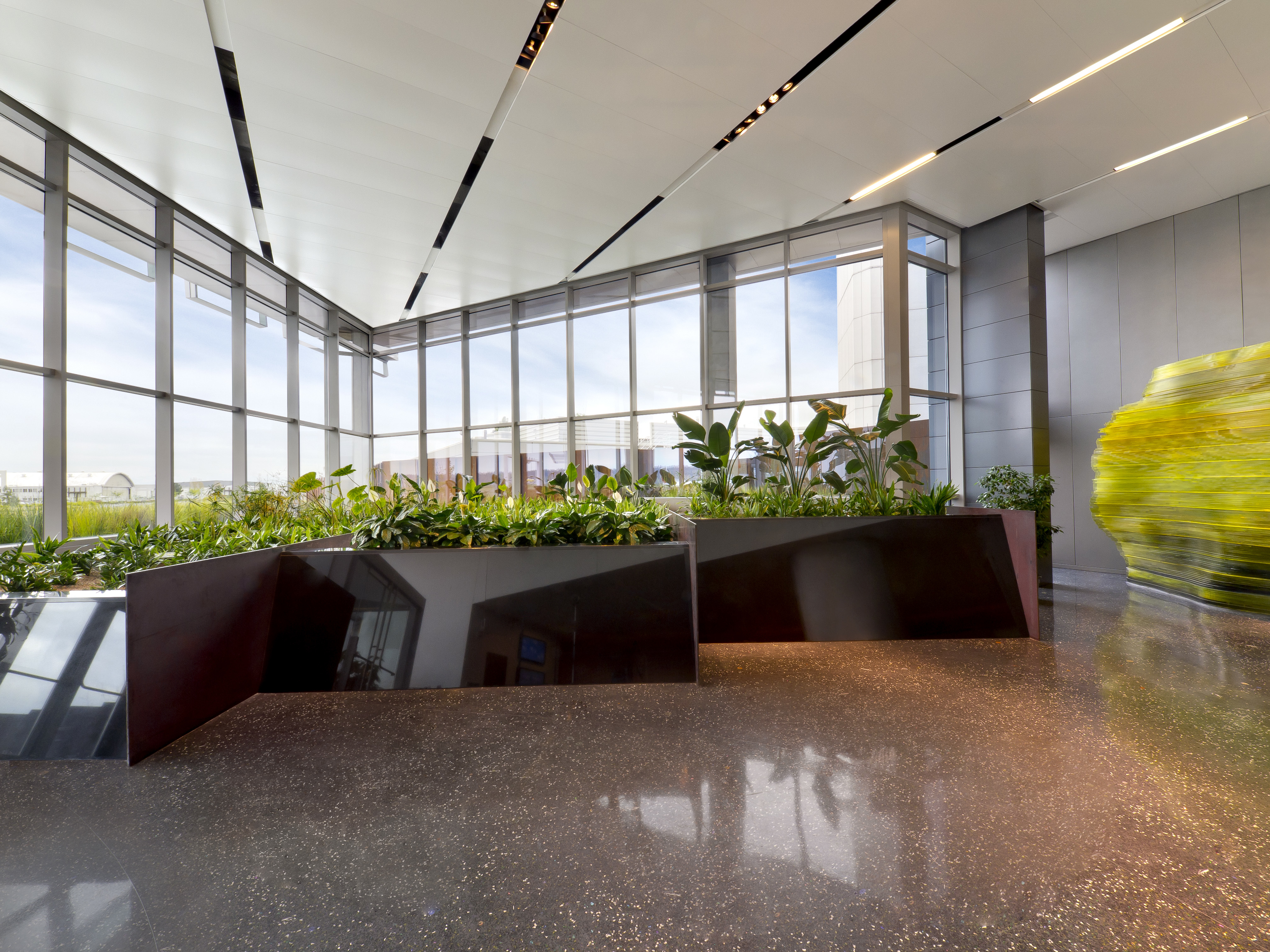
The Living Machine installation in the lobby of the Port of Portland headquarters.

A Living Machine is a form of ecological sewage treatment based on fixed-film ecology.

The Living Machine system was commercialized and is marketed by Living Machine Systems, L3C, a corporation based in Charlottesville, Virginia, United States.

== Examples ==
Examples of Living Machines are mechanical composters for industrial kitchens, effective microorganisms as fertilizer for agricultural purposes, and Integrated Biotectural systems in landscaping and architecture like Earthships or the IBTS Greenhouse.

Components like tomato plants (for more water purification) and fish (for food) have been part of the living, ecosystem-like designs. The theory does not limit the size of the system, or the amount of species. One design optimum is a natural ecosystem which is designed for a special purpose like a sewage treating wetland in a suitable ecosystem for the locality. Another optimum is an economically viable system returning profit for the investor. The practice of permaculture is one example for a compromise between the two optimum design points.

The scale of Living Machine systems ranges from the individual building to community-scale public works. Some of the earliest Living Machines were used to treat domestic wastewater in small, ecologically-conscious villages, such as Findhorn Community in Scotland. The latest-generation Tidal Flow Wetland Living Machines are being used in major urban office buildings, military bases, housing developments, resorts and institutional campuses.

== Living Machine System Process ==
- “Fixed film ecology” has superseded systems based on hydroponics or a fluid medium. In fixed film systems, the wetland cells are filled with a solid aggregate medium having extensive surface area for beneficial biofilm (treatment bacteria) growth. Fixed film ecology allows denser and more diverse micro-ecosystems to form than does a liquid medium. These ecosystems go well beyond bacteria to include a variety of organisms up to and including macro-vegetation.
- Tidal cycles (filling and draining the wetland in accelerated tidal action, with 12 or more cycles per day) are used to passively bring oxygen into the wetland cells. This action mimics the type of biological action that occurs in natural tidal estuaries. Tidal flow wetlands replace the need to blow air into a liquid medium - they use gravity to bring atmospheric oxygen into the cell when it is drained.

== See also ==
- Bioremediation
- Rain garden
- Anaerobic digestion
- Constructed wetlands
- Biomimicry
- IBTS Greenhouse
