= Frankenstein, Saxony =

Frankenstein
- Ortsteil of Oederan
- Interactive map of Frankenstein
- Location within Germany Location within Saxony
- Coordinates: 50°54′3″N 13°12′39″E
- Country: Germany
- State: Saxony
- District: Mittelsachsen
- Town: Oederan

Area
  - Total: 21.50 km^{2} (8.30 sq mi)
- Elevation: 398 m (1,306 ft)

Population (2010-12-31)
  - Total: 1,119
  - Density: 52.05/km^{2} (134.8/sq mi)
- Time zone: UTC+01:00 (CET)
  - Summer (DST): UTC+02:00 (CEST)
- Postal codes: 09569
- Dialling codes: 037321
- Vehicle registration: FG

Frankenstein (German pronunciation: [ˈfʁaŋkn̩ˌʃtaɪn]) is a former municipality in the district of Mittelsachsen, in Saxony, Germany. About 1100 people live there. With effect from 1 January 2012, it has been incorporated into the town of Oederan.
