= Oederan =

- Town
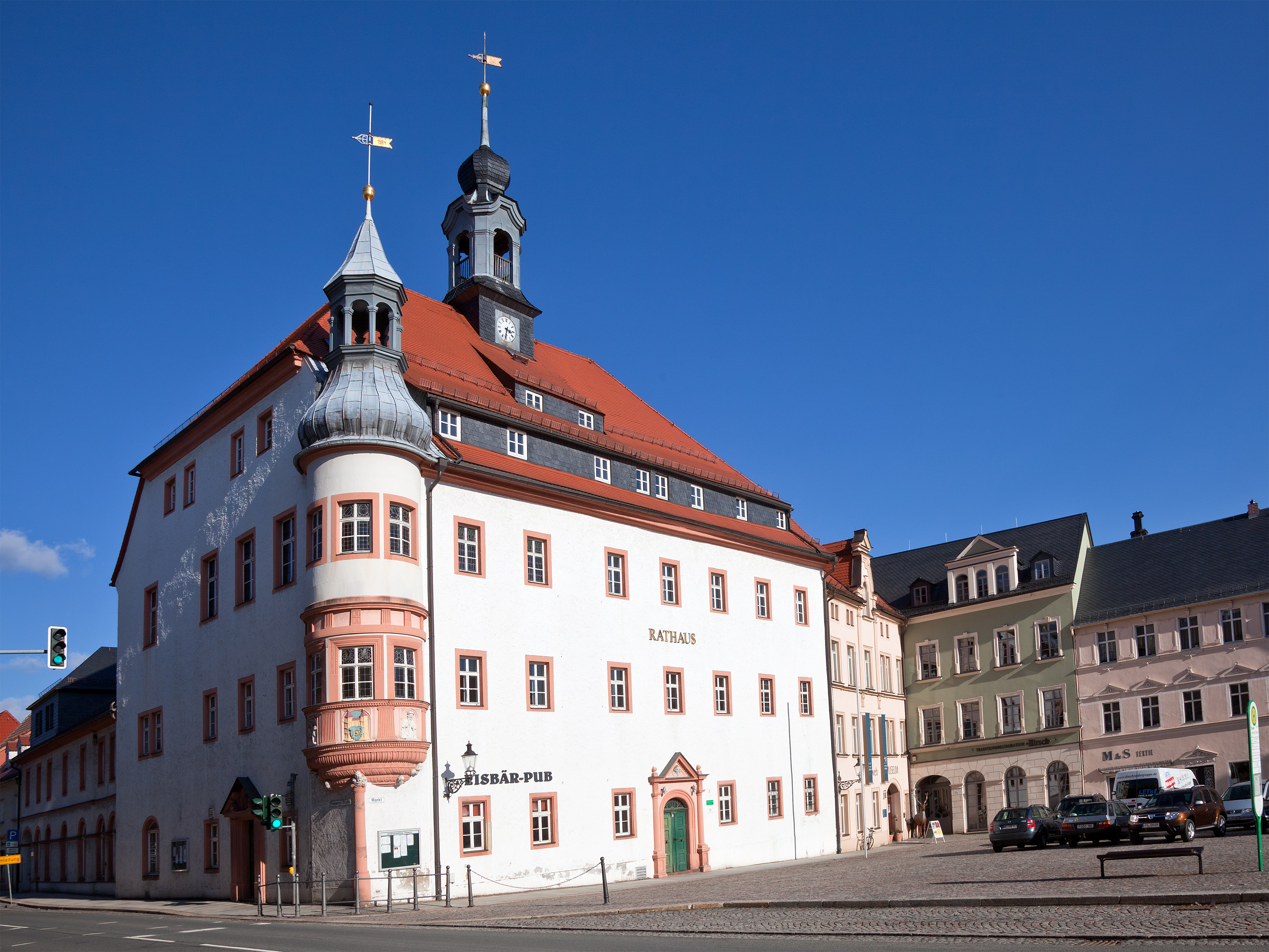
- Town hall of Oederan

- Coat of arms

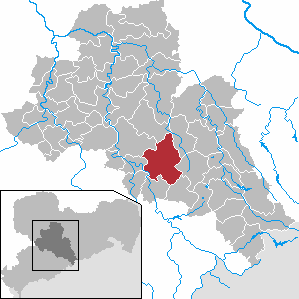
- Location of Oederan within Mittelsachsen district
- Interactive map of Oederan
- Location within Germany Location within Saxony
- Coordinates: 50°51′42″N 13°10′2″E
- Country: Germany
- State: Saxony
- District: Mittelsachsen
- Subdivisions: 7

Government
  - Mayor (2022–29): Steffen Schneider (FW)

Area
  - Total: 77.33 km^{2} (29.86 sq mi)
- Elevation: 400 m (1,300 ft)

Population (2025-12-31)
  - Total: 7,490
  - Density: 96.9/km^{2} (251/sq mi)
- Time zone: UTC+01:00 (CET)
  - Summer (DST): UTC+02:00 (CEST)
- Postal codes: 09569
- Dialling codes: 037292
- Vehicle registration: FG
- Website: www.oederan.de

Oederan (German pronunciation: [ˈøːdəʁaːn]) is a town in the district of Mittelsachsen, in Saxony, Germany.

== Geography ==
Oederan is situated 14 km southwest of Freiberg, 17 km east of Chemnitz and about 50 km west of Dresden.

The town includes the villages of Börnichen, Breitenau, Frankenstein, Gahlenz, Görbersdorf, Kirchbach, Lößnitztal and Schönerstadt.

== History ==
Oederan was first mentioned as town in 1286. The settlement of the area dates back to a Sorbian tribe in the 9th and 10th century. Rhenish Franconian farmers, craftsmen and traders settled down in the 12th century. Since the Middle Ages the most important industries had been cloth manufacturing and linen weaving. In the 19th century the railway construction had a great influence to the growth of the town. Some medium-sized factories were built around the train station of Oederan.

During World War II, a subcamp of Flossenbürg concentration camp was located here.

=== Literature ===
Cziborra, Pascal. KZ Oederan. Verlorene Jugend. Lorbeer Verlag. Bielefeld. 2008 ISBN 978-3-938969-06-9

== Places of interest ==
Oederan is known for its tourist attraction “Klein-Erzgebirge”, the oldest miniature park in Germany. About 185 miniatures of famous buildings from the area of the Ore Mountains in a reduced scale of 1:25 are shown here.

The most important old building is the gothic hall church. The history of the church goes back to the 13th century. An organ built by famous Gottfried Silbermann is located inside.

The second most prominent building of the town is the town hall. First built around 1400 AD, it burned down several times (1632, 1709 and 1753), and was re-erected in its present shape in 1785.

== Notable people ==
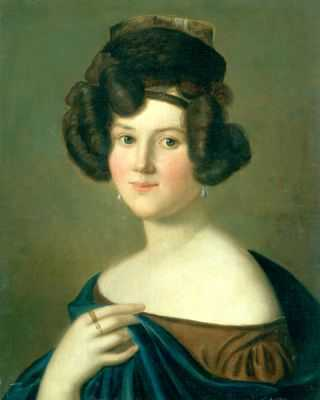
Minna Planer in 1835

- Valentin Schindler (1543–1604), philologist and orientalist
- Johann Klemm (c. 1595 – c. 1659), composer, organist and music publisher
- Minna Planer (1809–1866), Richard Wagner's first wife, actress
- Adolf Gottlieb Fiedler (1771–1850), Saxon entrepreneur in Saxony and Poland
- Herbert Böhme (1879–1971), Superintendent of the Lutheran Evangelical Lutheran Church of Saxony in the church district of Meißen
- Adolf Gottlieb Fiedler (1771–1850), entrepreneur in Saxony and Poland
- Martin Hoffmann (born 1930), student resistance in the GDR, 2002 founder of the Zeitkundemuseum in Oederan, 2008 Federal Cross for his commitment to the elaboration of the GDR's injustice
- Igor Mitoraj (1944–2014), Polish sculptor and painter, born in Oederan
