= Death of Sonja Engelbrecht =

Ongoing German criminal case from 1995

Sonja Engelbrecht
- Born: Sonja Stephanie Engelbrecht; 4 April 1976; Munich, Germany
- Disappeared: 11 April 1995 (aged 19); Munich, Germany
- Died: 1995 (aged 19)
- Body discovered: Summer, 2020; Kipfenberg, Germany
- Known for: disappearance and discovery of remains
- Parents: Harry Engelbrecht (father); Ingrid Engelbrecht (mother)

On the night of 10–11 April 1995, 19-year-old Sonja Engelbrecht disappeared at the Stiglmaierplatz in Munich, Germany. Her death was announced on 23 November 2021, after her remains were discovered in a forest near Kipfenberg. Police have not determined a manner of death, but assume that she was killed in a sexually motivated attack.

Engelbrecht's case has generated sustained coverage over several decades both in major German newspapers and the tabloid press. It has been described as one of Germany's major disappearance cases and Munich's most famous cold case. Her case was featured on national television programs like Hans Meiser and Menschen bei Maischberger. Germany's most popular crime show Aktenzeichen XY ... ungelöst covered her case two times, in 2012 and 2023.

== Sonja Engelbrecht ==
Sonja Engelbrecht (4 April 1976; disappeared 11 April 1995; found dead 2020) was a student at a vocational school with a focus on economics and doing an internship at a law firm. At the time of her disappearance, she was living with her parents in the Laim district of Munich. Engelbrecht had an older sister with whom she shared a car.

According to her parents, Engelbrecht had a regular group of friends with whom she went out on the weekend, but was personally rather shy. She listened to dark wave music, and visited clubs like the Tilt, Flex and Backstage, which catered to Munich's alternative music scene. Engelbrecht had a number of suitors but was not in a committed relationship at the time of her disappearance. Her parents also told reporters that she had a good relationship with them and was not taking illegal drugs. This was corroborated after her disappearance when police investigated possible links to the Munich drug scene but were unable to find any connections.

Engelbrecht was about 170 cm (5 ft 7 in) tall and is described as slim, weighing 50 kilograms (110 lb). She had long, blonde hair, greenish-blue eyes, pierced ears and wore a nose ring. Her overall appearance is described as attractive. On the night she went missing, she was wearing a purple jumper, black leather trousers, a black leather jacket and black high-heel shaft boots.

== Disappearance ==
Key events in the disappearance
1 Munich Central Station, 9.15 p.m.
2 Stiglmaierplatz, U1, 9.30 p.m.
3 Zum Vollmond, 9.40 p.m.
4 Flat at Schellingstraße, 0.40 a.m.
5 Stiglmaierplatz, phone booth, 2.28 a.m.

=== Monday, 10 April ===
Engelbrecht did not plan to go out on 10 April; however, she spontaneously changed her mind when a former schoolmate invited her to the pub Zum Vollmond. This pub was frequented by a younger audience interested in Independent, Wave and Punk music styles. Despite it being a Monday, Engelbrecht did not have to attend classes next day due to her vocational school being on spring break during Holy Week.

At 9.15 p.m., Engelbrecht met with the friend at Munich Central Station. From there, the two took the U1 subway line to the Stiglmaierplatz. They then walked to the pub Zum Vollmond in the Schleißheimer Straße where they arrived at around 9.40 p.m. At the pub, they met two acquaintances by chance and the four of them then spent some time together.

=== Tuesday, 11 April ===
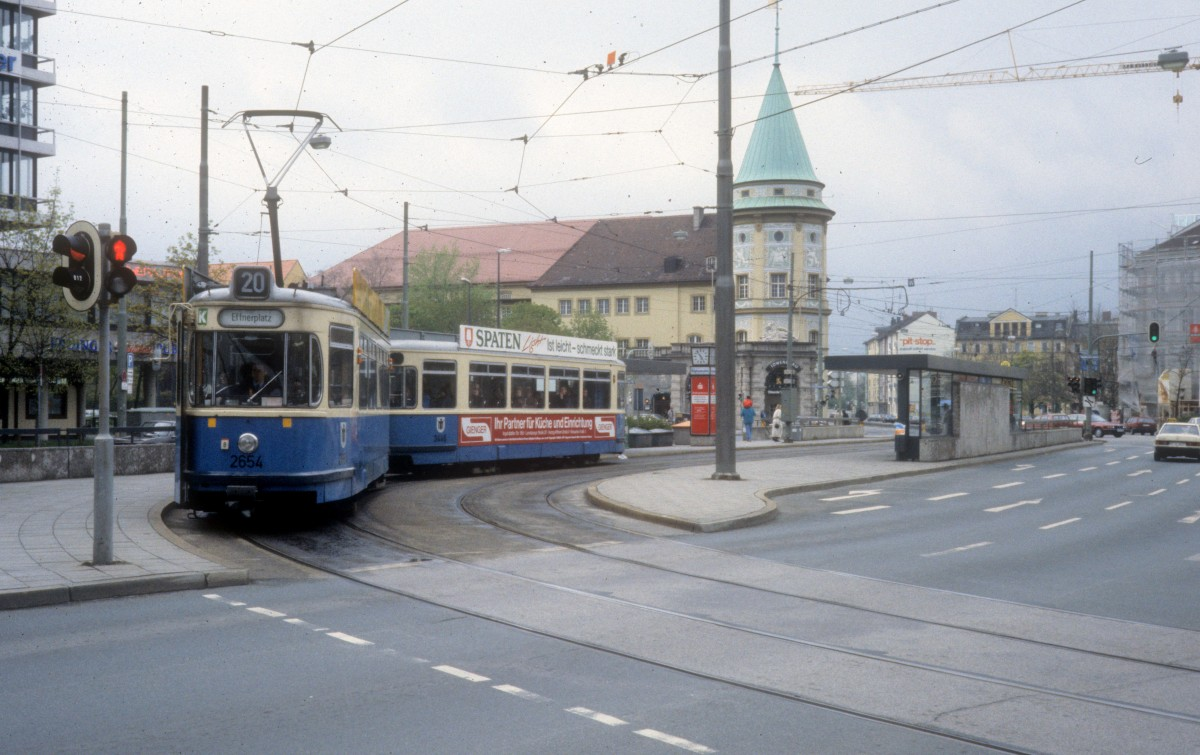
Engelbrecht was last seen by a witness on April 11, 1995 at 2:28 a.m. at Stiglmaierplatz (shown here in 1990).

At some point after midnight, the group decided to continue the night in the apartment of one of those acquaintances. This apartment was situated in the nearby Schellingstraße. Around two a.m., Engelbrecht and her friend left this apartment. They walked back to the Stiglmaierplatz, which is a hub for a number of Munich's public transport lines. Engelbrecht wanted to call her sister to pick her up and drive her home, whereas her friend wanted to take the tram home. They arrived at Stiglmaierplatz at 2.28 a.m. and approached a telephone booth. However, when her companion saw the tram line N20 arriving, he gave her his phone card and quickly departed for the streetcar. Engelbrecht was left alone and was not seen or heard from after that.

== Investigation ==
Engelbrecht's parents informed the police about their daughter's disappearance on Wednesday, 12 April. Police did not investigate immediately because Engelbrecht was of legal age. They assumed instead that she had eloped for a few days and would likely reappear on her own.

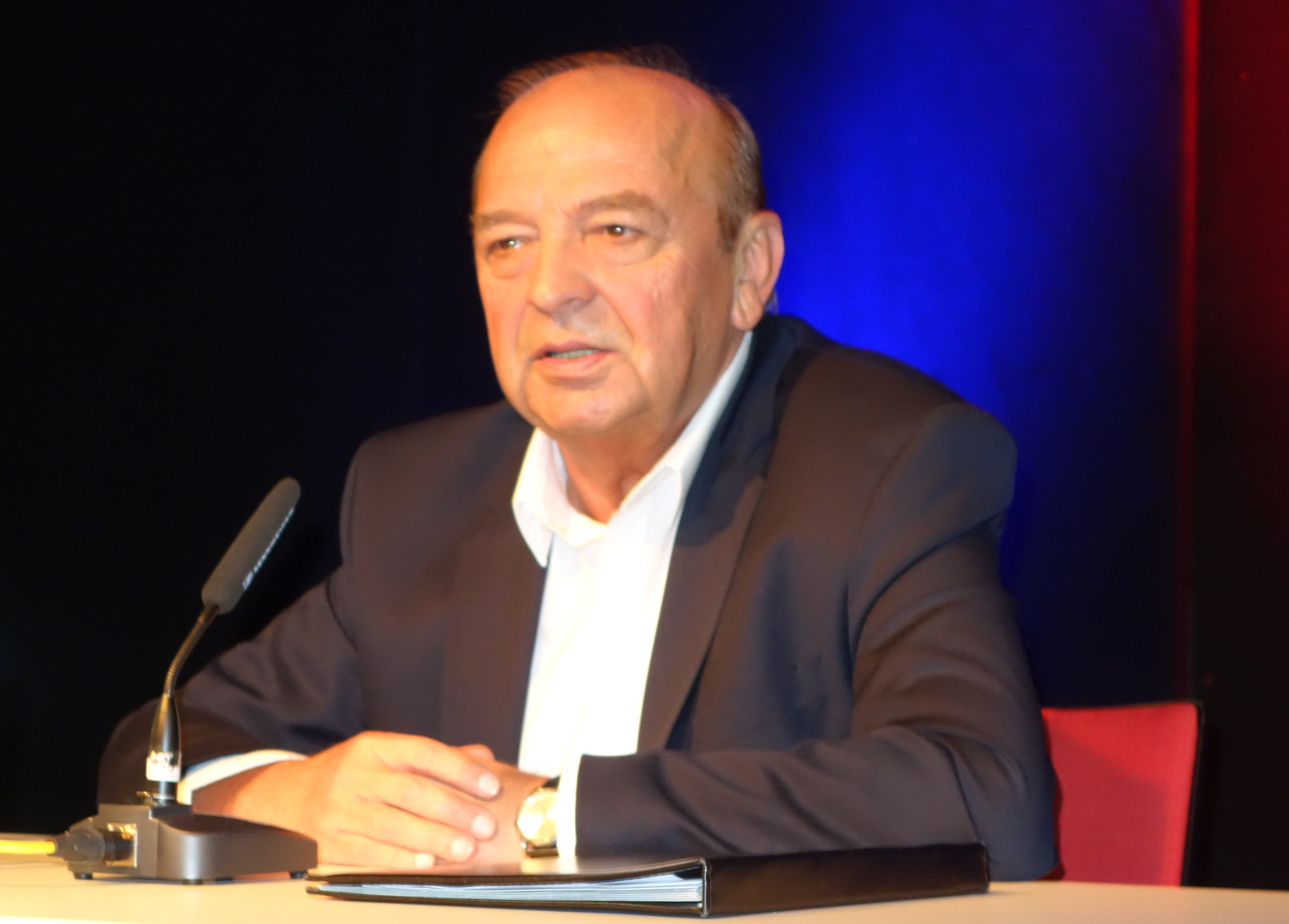
Josef Wilfling, head of the homicide division of Munich's police in the 2000s, cited Engelbrecht's case as the first case he regrets not having solved during his time in office.

When this did not happen, police began to look into her disappearance and after 15 days the case was already handed over to the homicide division. They formed a police detail SoKo Sonja, which consisted of six police detectives specialized in homicide and missing persons investigations. The detail questioned over 80 possible witnesses and followed a large number of possible leads. Police early on excluded the friend as a suspect. They also investigated possible links into Munich's drug scene, for whom the Stiglmaierplatz was a meeting place in the 90s, and even dug up the small garden of Engelbrecht's family to exclude all possibilities. Despite the lack of conclusive evidence, police came to consider a homicide as the most likely scenario and reportedly informed the parents at some point that there was not much more to do except to "wait until her body is found".

Police received new information in 2010, after Engelbrecht's case was featured in several television programs. A number of women came forward and reported a man who had approached them on the night of her disappearance, and the head of Munich's homicide division, Josef Wilfling, was optimistic about solving the case. When this did not happen, police decide to work together with Aktenzeichen XY ... ungelöst and address the public. On 28 November 2012, the new chief investigator Robert Bastian presented the case on the show. He pointed out that the Stiglmaierplatz was close to Munich's streetwalk in the 1990s and potential customers would typically cross it while cruising the area. He, therefore, asked whether former prostitutes or their customers would be willing to come forward as witnesses. However, none of these efforts provided further clues as to what happened to her after 2.30 a.m. on 11 April, and police spokesman Werner Kraus characterized her disappearance as the "case without leads".

== Discovery and renewed investigation ==
Key locations of the discovery
1 Approximate location of Engelbrecht's femur
2 Approximate location of the crevice

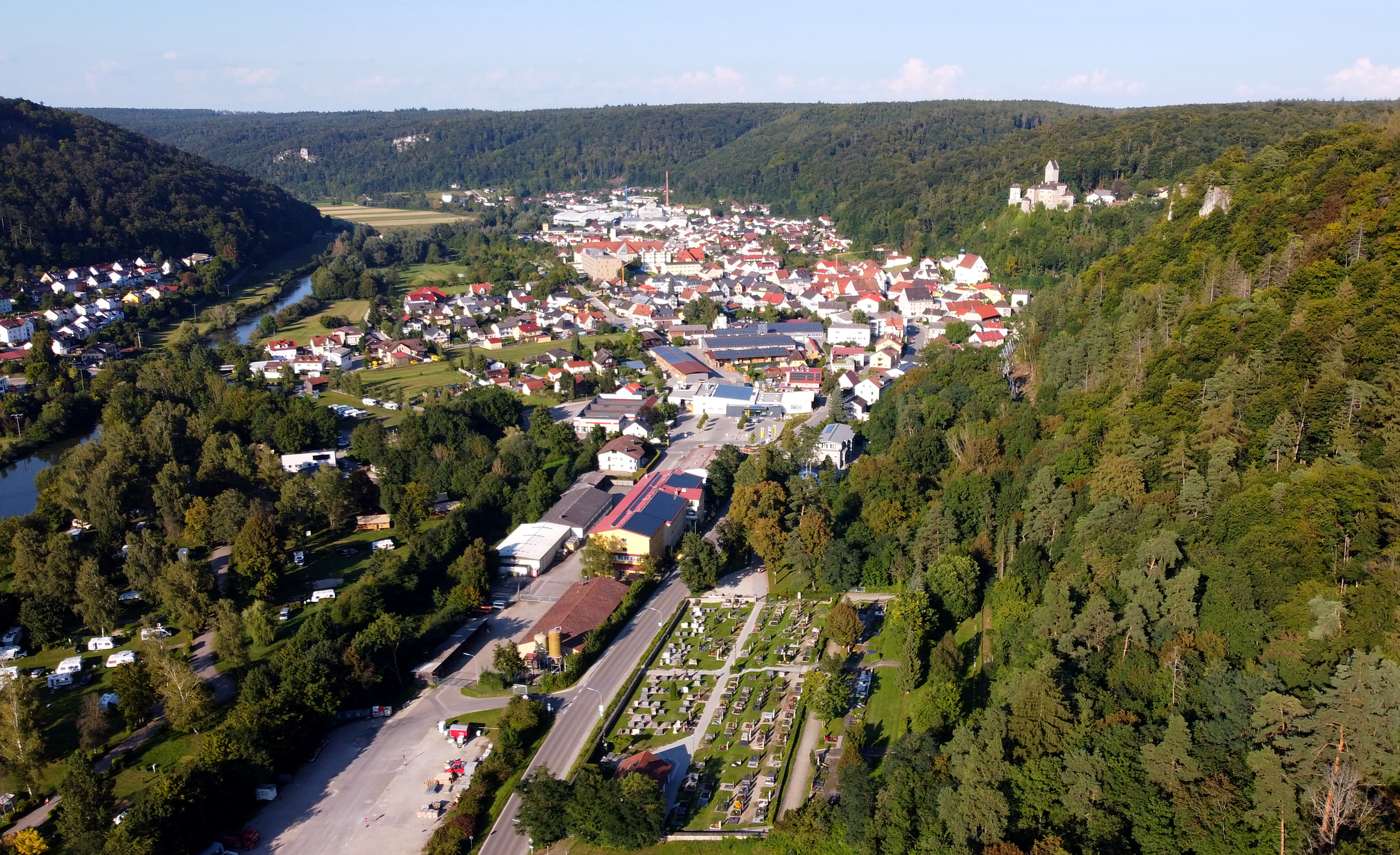
Engelbrecht's remains were discovered in a wooded area northwest (left in the picture) of Kipfenberg.

On 23 November 2021, it was announced that a bone was found by forestry workers in the summer of 2020 in a forest near Kipfenberg, Germany, about 100 kilometres (62 mi) north of Engelbrecht's last known location. This was positively identified by DNA examination as Engelbrecht 's femur. On 30 March 2022, investigators announced that there were additional large-scale search efforts. More bones and bone fragments were found at a steep hillside inside a crevice. These included a piece of lower jaw including teeth, which is being examined by DNA technology. Investigators assume that the crevice is where Engelbrecht was deposited, which is only about 200m from the femur found in 2020. Though people have been accused of killing her it has not been ruled a murder case and the cause of death is unknown.

To help with the newly discovered leads, police decided to go public again. To this end, they worked with Aktenzeichen XY... ungelöst, which featured Engelbrecht's case for the second time in March 2023. In this broadcast, the lead investigator, Roland Baader, presented a series of new finds and asked viewers for information. Baader confirmed that police had been able to create a DNA profile from the newly acquired evidence and asked for even "vague suspicions" to be reported. He also presented fragments of a blanket found alongside Engelbrecht's remains and enquired about possible clues to its identity. The programme led to a considerable number of hints, with over 50 calls received during the episode alone. In the weeks following the episode, an amateur sleuth indeed managed to identify the type of blanket from the artefacts shown in the episode.

== Media coverage ==
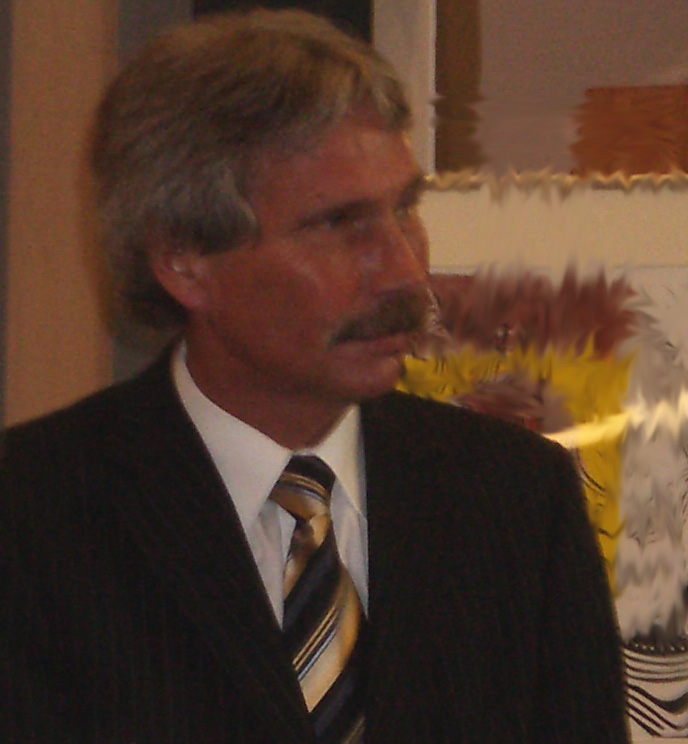
Udo Nagel, head of the homicide division of Munich's police in the 1990s, criticized the Süddeutsche Zeitung for perceived imbalances in their reporting on the case.

Engelbrecht's case initially attracted only modest interest and was mostly covered by local newspapers. Consequently, her parents tried to raise awareness of their daughter's disappearance by giving interviews and appearing on TV shows like the RTL talk show Hans Meiser, Fliege on Das Erste, and the Sat.1 show Bitte melde dich. Interest in her case increased when in 2012 her case was featured on the popular German crime show Aktenzeichen XY ... ungelöst due to perceived similarities to the disappearance of Natascha Kampusch. The episode made her case known to an audience of millions, and national newspapers and magazines began to report on her disappearance. In October 2013, her mother appeared on Menschen bei Maischberger.

When the recently-found femur was confirmed as belonging to Engelbrecht in 2021, RTL interviewed forensic biologist Mark Benecke about possible clues that could emerge from the find. In 2022, Germany's popular crime drama show Tatort broadcast the episode Borowski und der Schatten des Mondes (Borowski and the Shadow of the Moon), for which Engelbrecht's case has been named as an inspiration. In 2023, 'Aktenzeichen XY ... ungelöst' covered her case a second time. This episode led to a number of new clues and major publications regularly reported on new developments in the case.

The media also reported on the difficult relationship between Engelbrecht's family and the police. Her parents have expressed frustration over what they perceived as a lack of trust and a misplaced focus in the investigation. On the other hand, Udo Nagel published an open letter in the Süddeutsche Zeitung in which he addressed and rejected these accusations. Josef Wilfling, head of Munich's homicide division in the 2000s, used Engelbrecht's case in an interview about the disappearance of Rebecca Reusch to point out the difficult "balancing act" that homicide investigators face when talking to relatives of a missing person.

== Theories ==
=== Parents ===
Prior to the discovery of Engelbrecht's remains, her parents had opined that their daughter may have become a victim of human trafficking. They also speculated about possible perpetrators from the Occult and Goth scene. The parents also expressed doubts about the friend's version of events, stating that Engelbrecht's sister had not received a phone call that night and that both a phone booth and a tram stop would have been quicker to reach than walking to Stiglmaierplatz. They, therefore, suspected that said friend may have been involved in her disappearance.

=== Police ===
Police, however, ruled out Engelbrecht's companions from that night as suspects at an early stage and repeatedly confirmed that their statements matched the results of the investigation in all points relevant to the crime. They initially assumed she may have eloped for a few days. But when she failed to reappear, police began to consider homicide to be the most likely scenario. They assumed that she either voluntarily got into her killer's car to get home or that she was forced to do so. The head of Munich's homicide division at the time, Udo Nagel, said that otherwise witnesses would have remembered seeing the "strikingly attractive" Engelbrecht that night. This theory was further substantiated by investigations that indicated that at least on one previous occasion she had tried to hitchhike home after a night out.

After her remains were discovered in 2020, new evidence was found that prompted the police to revise and improve their assessment. For example, the fact that she was found without any clothing substantiated their theory that she was murdered in a sexually motivated attack. Instead, the killer had her body wrapped in tarps that had previously been used during construction or renovation work. Police therefore believe that the perpetrator may have been a house painter or be otherwise involved in renovation work in 1995. This has been connected to a large trade fair for the construction industry, which took place on Munich's Theresienwiese on the weekend prior to her disappearance. Moreover, her killer is assumed to have a close connection to Kipfenberg, as the place where she was found was difficult to access and hardly known even among locals.

=== Other ===
Due to some similarities with the disappearance of two other women in Munich in the 1990s, it has also been suspected that a serial killer could be responsible. However, after new evidence emerged in these cases, police no longer assumed a connection. Commentators also noted similarities with the rape and murder of a young woman in Freiburg in 1997, who had likewise disappeared after an industrial trade fair and whose body was later found in a forest. The press also speculated about a possible connection with the discovery of two bodies, which were also found in a forest near Kipfenberg in 2020. The two dead were identified as a young couple from Ingolstadt who had been missing since 2002. However, the Ingolstadt public prosecutor's office considers the case of the couple being connected to Ingolstadt's drug scene and described the temporal and spatial proximity to the discovery of Engelbrecht as a "very, very strange coincidence".

== See also ==
- Disappearance of Rebecca Reusch
- List of solved missing person cases (1990s)
- List of unsolved deaths
