= Noschkowitz =

Coordinates: 51.1894°N 13.1401°E

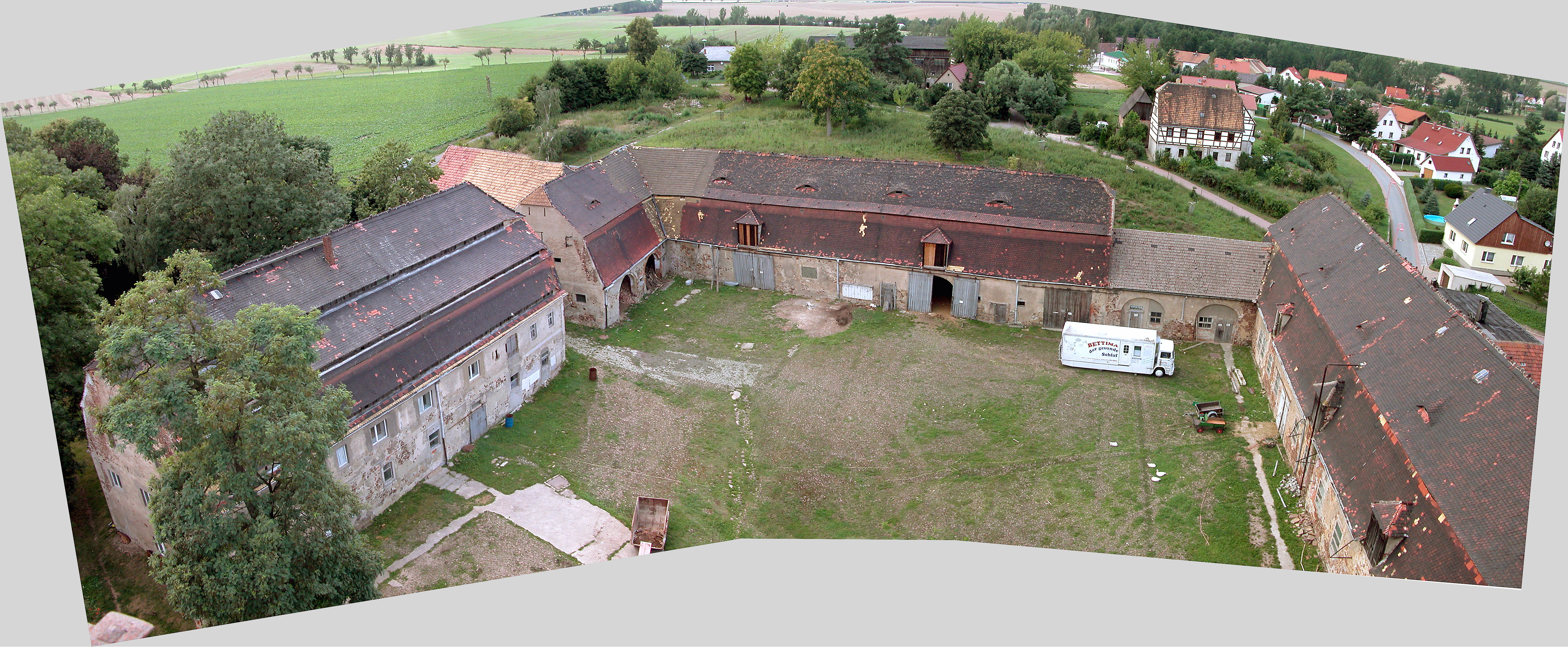
Noschkowitz Manor house (15th–17th centuries). View from the large tower of the manor house looking down at the estate courtyard, featuring the west, north, and east wings.

Noschkowitz is a hamlet which is a dependency (ortsteil) of Jahnatal (before 2023 Ostrau), a municipality of Mittelsachsen kreis in Saxony, Germany. It is in the valley of the Rittmitzer Bach (a tributary of the Jahna), 8 kilometres north of Döbeln.

It is known for Schloss Noschkowitz, records of which date back to the 13th century.

== Local notables ==
- Adolphus Zimmermann, Wisconsin brewer, legislator and local official, was a native of Noschkowitz.
