= Alexander Strähuber =

Austrian-German artist (1814–1882)

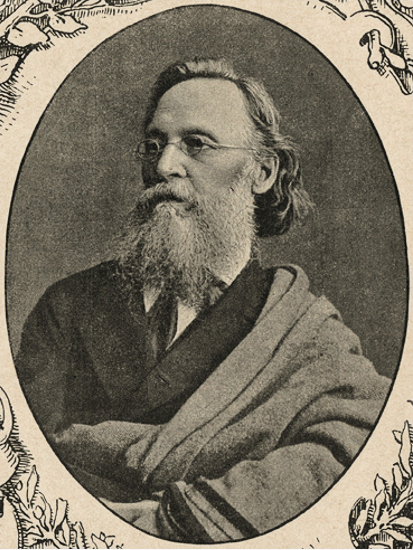
- Born: 28 February 1814; Mondsee, Austria
- Died: 31 December 1882 (aged 68); Munich, Germany
- Occupations: Painter and professor

Alexander Strähuber (or Straehuber; 1814–1882) was an Austrian-born German history painter and book illustrator. From 1865 to 1882 he was a professor at the Royal Academy of Fine Arts in Munich.

Strähuber was born on 28 February 1814 at Mondsee in Upper Austria. He was son to Alexander Strähuber, a stable master to the Wrede barony of Bavaria.

At the age of seven he moved to Munich with his parents and attended grammar school. After showing a talent for drawing, he transferred to the Munich Polytechnic School (Polytechnische Schule München), founded in 1828, where he received drawing lessons from Joseph Anton Rhomberg and Hermann Mitterer. In 1829 he enrolled at the Royal Academy of Fine Arts, becoming a student of the history and biblical subject painters Heinrich Hess and Clemens von Zimmermann, and the Nazarene Julius Schnorr von Carolsfeld. Von Carolsfeld entrusted Strähuber with individual commissions for painting in the royal palace of the Munich Residenz.

In 1860 Strähuber was one of the founding members of Munich's Vereins für Christliche Kunst (Association for Christian Art), of which he was the first chairman from 1866 until his death. In 1862 he began work as an assistant teacher at the Royal Academy, and in 1865 was appointed professor, and with Johann Georg Hiltensperger and Hermann Anschütz he taught in the antiquities class; among his students were Wilhelm Leibl, Franz Widnmann, Julian Fałat and Robert Raudner. In 1879 he was awarded the Order of Saint Michael.

In addition to paintings, Strähuber created numerous religious drawings and illustrations for religious books, as well as designs for stained glass windows including those for the glass painting studio of Max Ainmiller.

In 1844 he married Magdalena Stahl, daughter to a Bavarian court musician; the marriage produced three sons, Max, Sigmund, and Julius. Max Strähuber studied science and theology and became a chaplain to St Ludwig's Church, Celle. Sigmund Strähuber studied at the Akademie der Bildenden Künste München (Academy of Fine Arts), and became a professor at the Munich Royal School of Applied Arts. Julius Strähuber, studied at the Munich Polytechnic School (Polytechnische Schule München).

Strähuber died on 31 December 1882 in Munich, and was buried in the Alter Südfriedhof (Old South Cemetery), in Munich. In 1947 Strähuberstrasse, in the Solln district of Munich, was named after him.

== Bibliography ==
- Verein für christliche Kunst in München (Hrsg.): Festgabe zur Erinnerung an das 50jähr. Jubiläum. Lentner’sche Hofbuchhandlung, Munich 1910, pp. 67–70
- Constantin von Wurzbach: "Straehuber, Alexander." In: Biographisches Lexikon des Kaiserthums Oesterreich (Biographical Lexicon of the Empire of Austria). Part 39 Kaiserlich-königliche Hof- und Staatsdruckerei, Vienna 1879, p. 210 (digitalised).
