= Konrad Schumann =

East German soldier and defector (1942–1998)

- Schumann leaping over barbed wire into West Berlin on 15 August 1961
- Born: Hans Conrad Schumann; 28 March 1942; Zschochau, Gau Saxony, Nazi Germany
- Died: 20 June 1998 (aged 56); Kipfenberg, Bavaria, Germany
- Cause of death: Suicide by hanging
- Occupations: Policeman; Audi car assembly worker; Winery worker
- Known for: Defecting from East to West Berlin in 1961
- Spouse: Kunigunde Schumann (m. 1962)
- Children: 1
- Military career
- Allegiance: East Germany
- Branch: Volkspolizei-Bereitschaften

Hans Conrad Schumann, also known as Konrad Schumann (28 March 1942 – 20 June 1998), was an East German Bereitschaftspolizist who escaped to West Germany during the construction of the Berlin Wall in 1961.

== Early life ==
Born in Zschochau (now part of Jahnatal) during World War II, Schumann enlisted in the Volkspolizei-Bereitschaft, a paramilitary unit of the East German police, following his 18th birthday. After three months of training in Dresden, he was posted to a non-commissioned officers' college in Potsdam, after which he volunteered for service in Berlin.

== Escape to West Germany ==
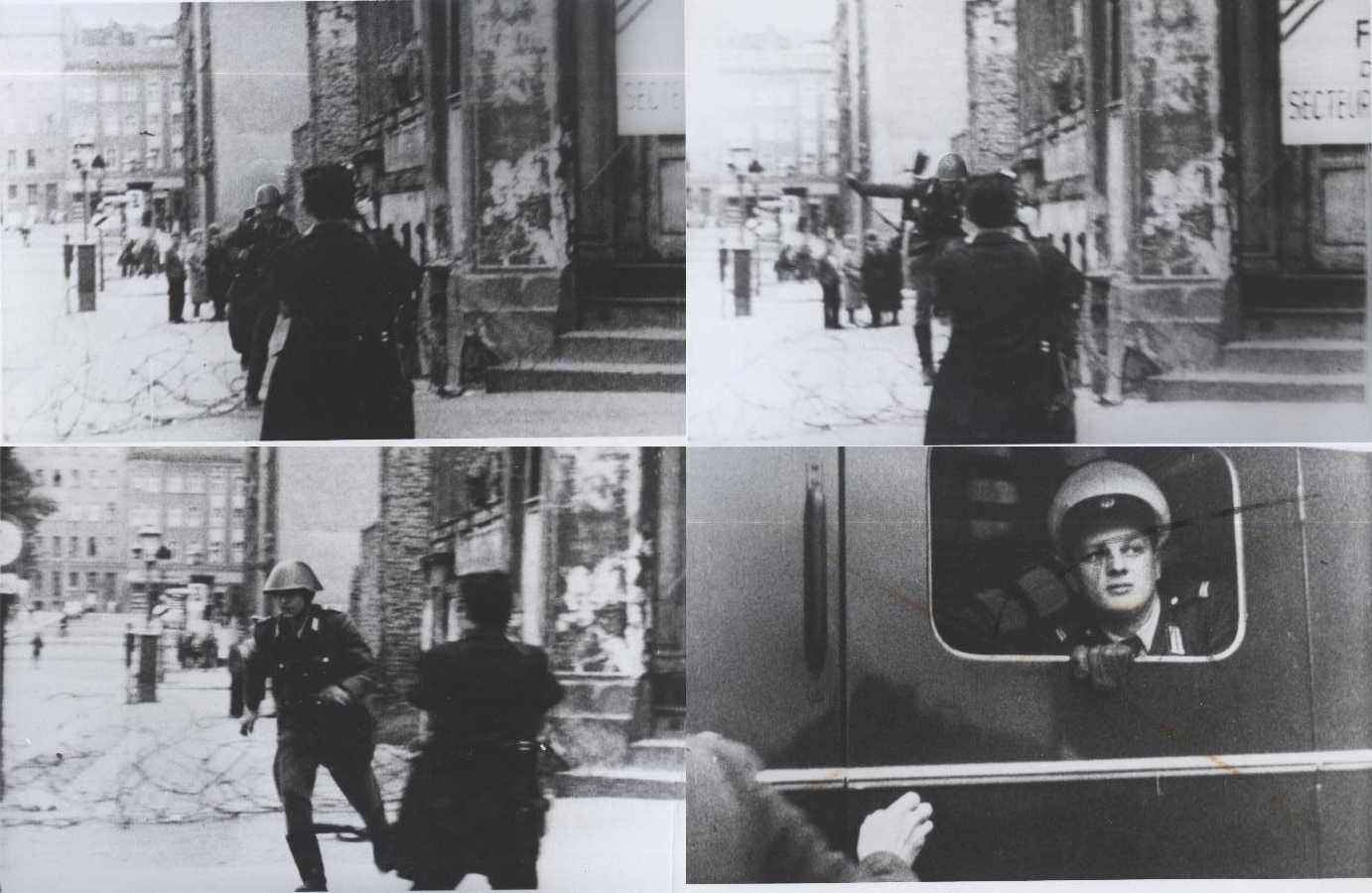
Schumann's jump over a fence

On 15 August 1961, 19-year-old Schumann was sent to the corner of Ruppiner Straße and Bernauer Straße to guard what would become the Berlin Wall on its third day of construction. Schumann and his unit arrived at 4:30 a.m., where an officer ordered them to "take control and protect the border from the enemies of socialism." Schumann later recalled: "We stood around looking pretty stupid at first. Nobody had told us how that's done: taking control of a border." At the time, the barrier was a single coil of concertina wire.

Throughout the morning, Schumann became distressed by West Berlin residents shouting at him: "You pigs!" "You traitors!" "You concentration camp guards!" as he stood at his post. Schumann became further upset when a young woman in East Berlin passed a bouquet of flowers over the top of the wire to her mother in West Berlin. The young woman apologized to her mother for not being able to visit, then motioned to Schumann: "Those [people] over there, they won't let me cross anymore." Schumann felt he would be spending the rest of his life keeping his fellow citizens imprisoned, and be a prisoner himself.

By noon, a large crowd of West Berlin demonstrators approached the wire at Schumann's post, shouting various slogans, including "Freiheit (Freedom)." Schumann recalled: "Suddenly the mass of people moved toward us like a living wall. I thought: they're going to run over us right away. I was nervous and didn't know what to do. I didn't want to shoot and I wasn't supposed to." Before Schumann was forced to act, more soldiers arrived in armored cars and pushed the crowd back with bayonets.

Over the next four hours, construction equipment and trucks loaded with concrete posts and steel plates began to arrive and unload materials to build the wall. Realizing his window of opportunity was closing, Schumann stamped on a section of wire to flatten it. West Berliners noticed, and a young man approached Schumann. "Get back at once!" yelled Schumann, then whispered, "I'm going to jump." The young man alerted the West Berlin police, who arrived with a van.

Schumann waited until the East German police were facing away, and at roughly 4:00 pm, quickly jumped over the barrier, dropped his PPSh-41 submachine gun, ran north on Ruppiner Straße, across Bernauer Straße, and jumped into the West Berlin police van. West German photographer Peter Leibing photographed Schumann's escape. The photograph, entitled Leap into Freedom, quickly became an iconic image of the Cold War and was featured at the beginning of the 1982 Disney film Night Crossing. The scene, including Schumann's preparations, was also filmed on 16 mm film from the same perspective by camera operator Dieter Hoffmann.

Schumann moved from West Berlin to West Germany, and settled in Bavaria. In 1962, he met and married Kunigunde Gunda in Günzburg, had a son, and began a new job at a winery. Schumann subsequently worked at the Ingolstadt Audi factory until his death in 1998.

== Later life and death ==
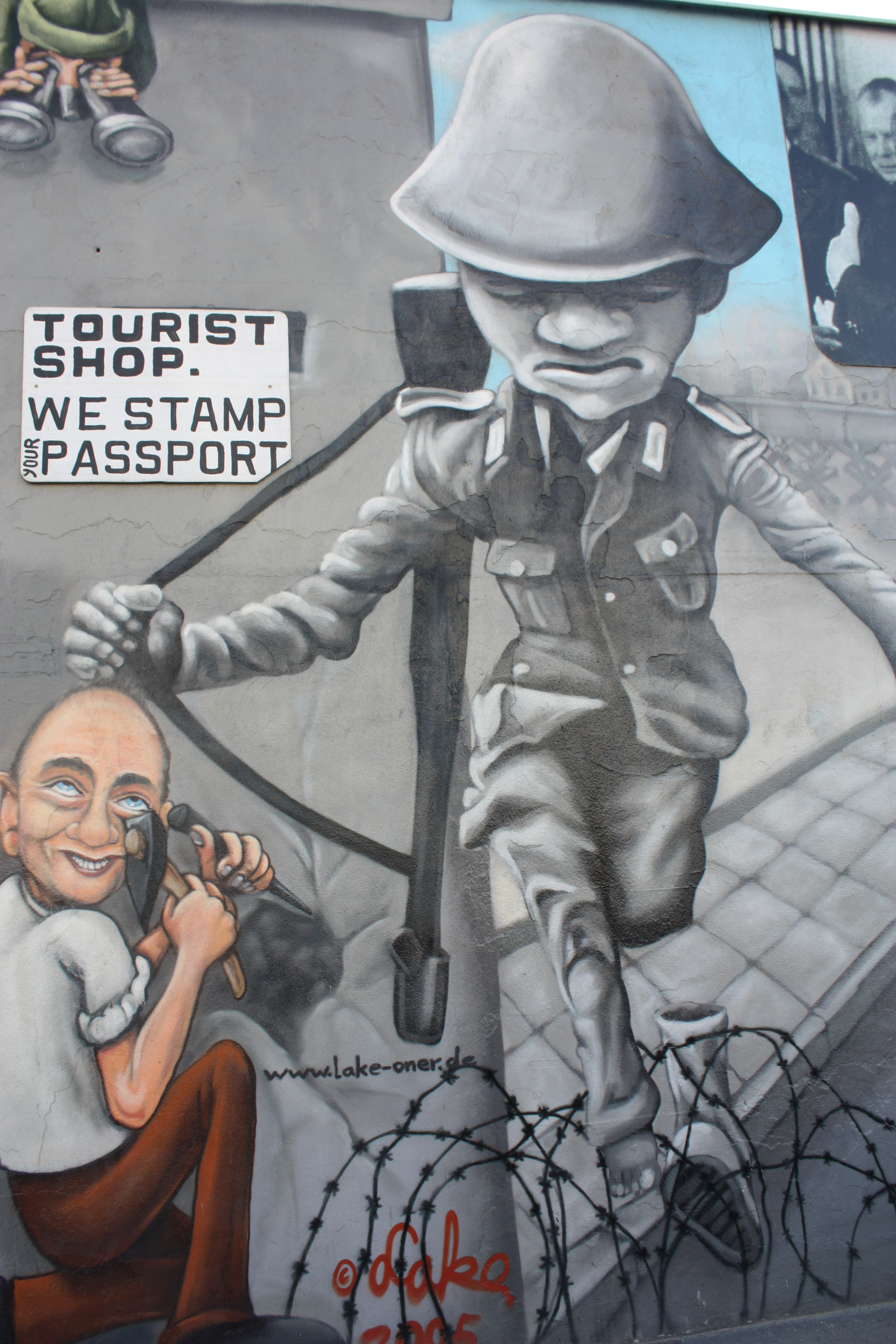
Schumann-inspired graffiti in the East Side Gallery, Berlin

Until the fall of the Berlin Wall, Schumann feared that the Stasi would try to assassinate him. After the fall of the Wall Schumann said, "Only since 9 November 1989 [the date of the fall] have I felt truly free." Even so, he continued to feel more at home in Bavaria than in his birthplace, citing old frictions with his former colleagues, and was even hesitant to visit his parents and siblings in Saxony. When he returned to East Germany after the reunification to visit his relatives, he was rejected by them, as they saw him as a traitor who had abandoned his family.

On 20 June 1998, suffering from depression, he died by suicide, hanging himself in his orchard near the town of Kipfenberg in Upper Bavaria. His body was found by his wife a few hours later.

In May 2011, the photograph of Schumann's "leap into freedom" was inducted into the UNESCO Memory of the World programme as part of a collection of documents on the fall of the Berlin Wall.

== Monument ==
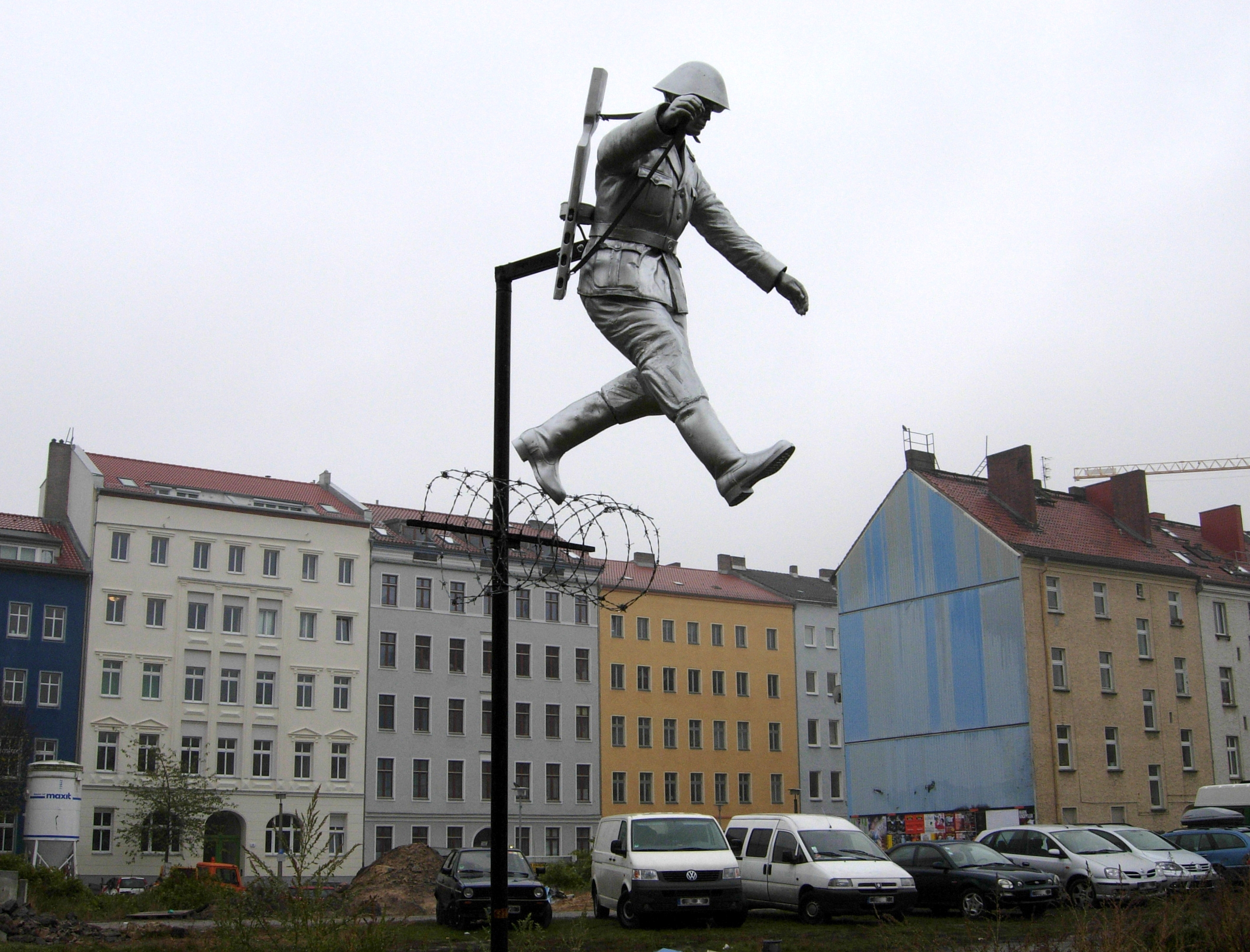
Mauerspringer ("wall jumper") sculpture by Florian and Michael Brauer and Edward Anders

A sculpture called Mauerspringer ("Walljumper") by Florian and Michael Brauer and Edward Anders could be seen close to the site of the defection, but has since been moved to the side of a building on Brunnenstraße, several meters south of Bernauer Straße.

== Literature ==
- Christoph Links: Schumann, Conrad. In: Wer war wer in der DDR? 5. Ausgabe. Band 2, Ch. Links, Berlin 2010, ISBN 978-3-86153-561-4.

== Motion pictures ==
- The 1982 Walt Disney movie Night Crossing's pre-opening credits scenes include footage of Schumann's escape before the Wall's completion.

== See also ==
- List of Soviet and Eastern Bloc defectors
- List of photographs considered the most important
