= Rhomberg =

Rhomberg is a surname. Notable people with the surname include:

- Joseph Anton Rhomberg (1786–1853), Austrian-born German painter, illustrator, and graphic artist
- Kevin Rhomberg (born 1955), American baseball player
- Patricia Rhomberg (born 1953), Austrian pornographic film actress
- Rudolf Rhomberg (1920–1968), Austrian film actor
