= Biberg =

- Ortsteil of Kipfenberg
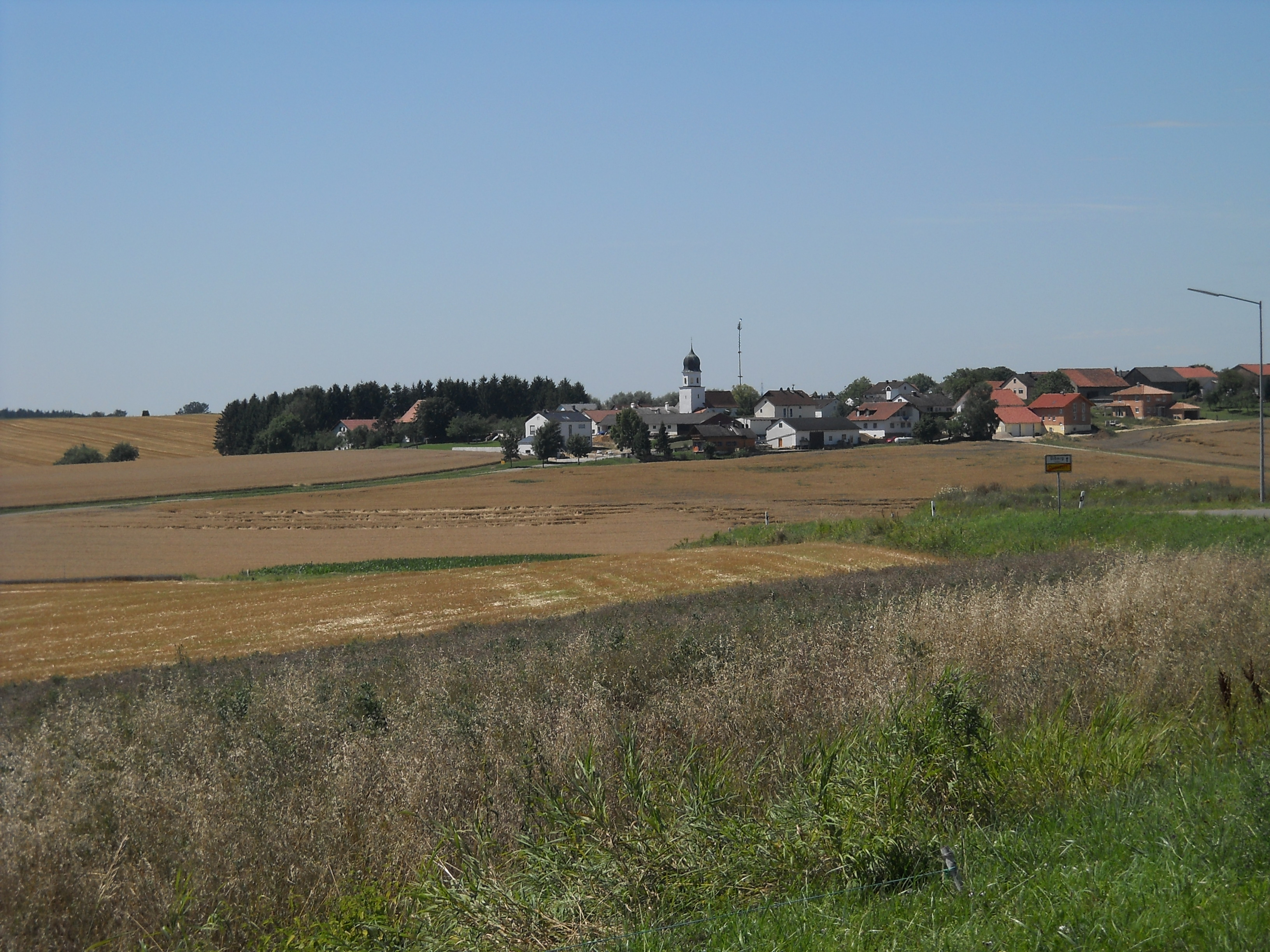
- Interactive map of Biberg
- Location within Germany Location within Bavaria
- Coordinates: 48°53′40″N 11°24′52″E
- Country: Germany
- State: Bavaria
- Admin. region: Oberbayern
- District: Eichstätt
- Municipality: Kipfenberg
- Elevation: 500 m (1,600 ft)

Population (2021)
  - Total: 349
- Time zone: UTC+01:00 (CET)
  - Summer (DST): UTC+02:00 (CEST)
- Postal codes: 85110
- Dialling codes: 08466
- Vehicle registration: EI
- Website: www.bayerns-mitte.de

Biberg is a village in the municipality of Kipfenberg in the district of Eichstätt in Bavaria, Germany. It is located roughly 10 km south of Kipfenberg and 20 km north of Ingolstadt. Biberg is within the Naturpark Altmühltal and is on a rolling plain along with the nearby villages of Schelldorf, Krut, Dunsdorf, and Appenzel.
