= Friedrich Salzer =

German painter (1827–1876)

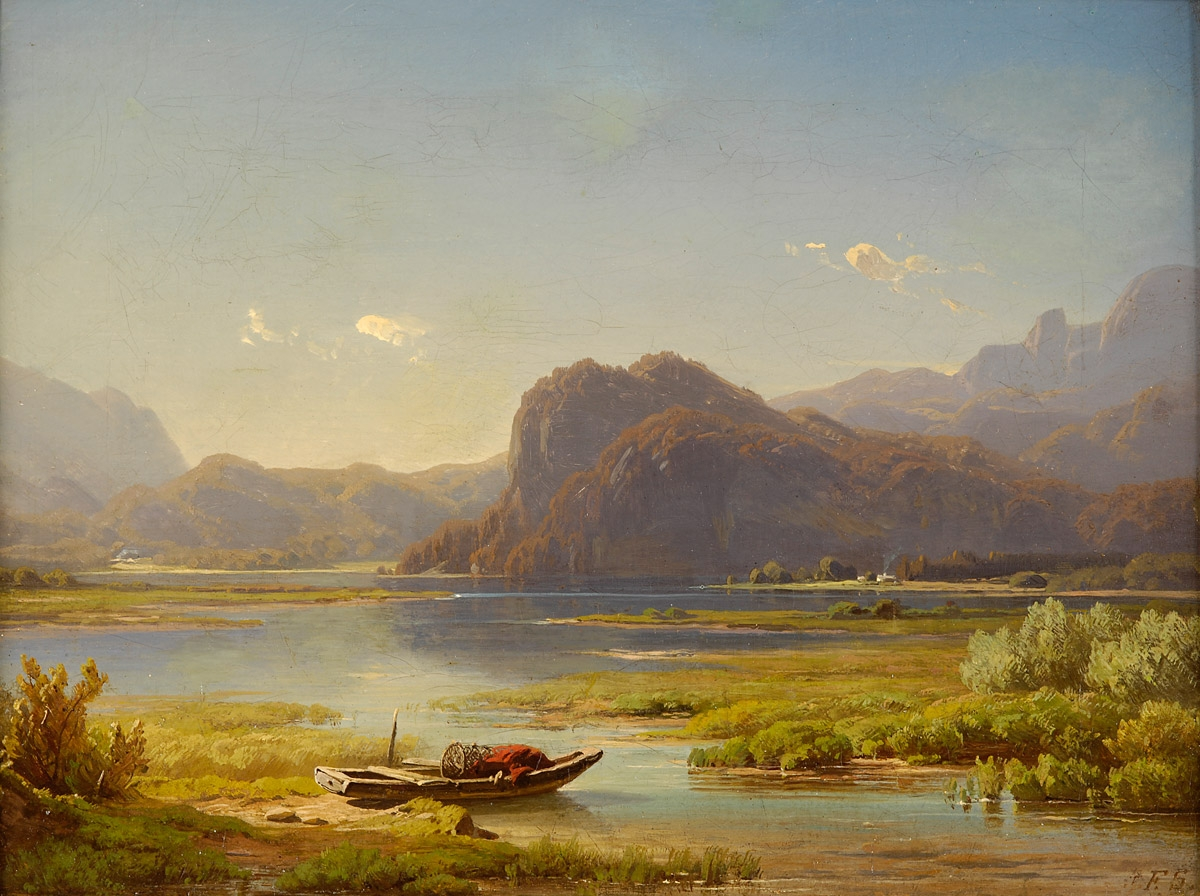
Summer Lake Landscape

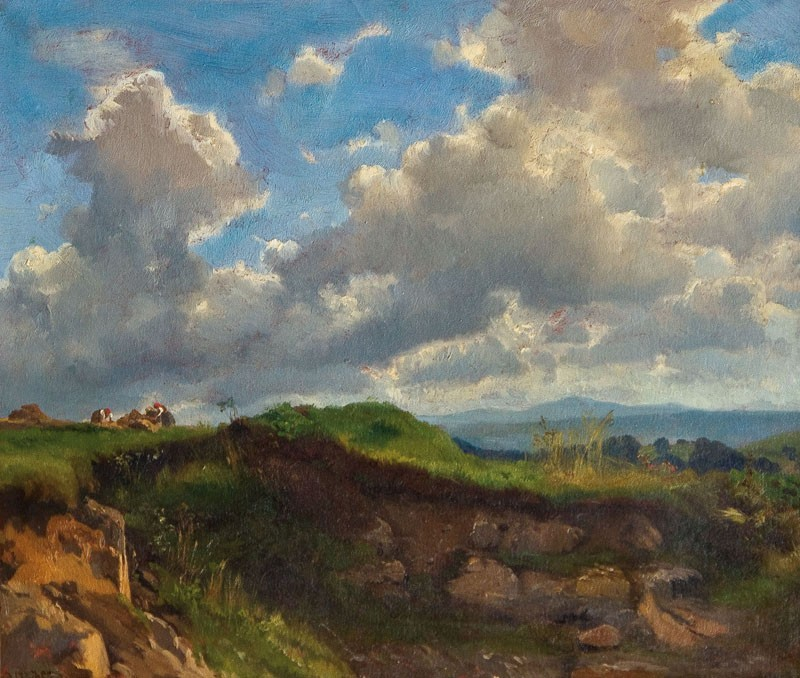
Idyllic Landscape Under a Cloudy Sky

Friedrich Salzer (1 June 1827 – 14 May 1876) was a German landscape painter. He specialized in winter scenes and forest views.

== Biography ==
His father, Johann Jakob Salzer (1798–1879), came from Dettingen an der Erms to open a paint store, which eventually became a paint factory. Salzer was born in Heilbronn to his father's first wife, Elisabeth. After becoming a widower in 1860, his father married again, to the much younger Caroline Haas, who gave birth to his half-brother, Eugen, a publisher of evangelical literature.

Salzer initially worked in his father's paint factory, while taking lessons from a local artist named Karl Baumann. In 1846, upon Baumann's recommendation, he moved to Munich to continue his artistic training and began his studies with the Tyrolean painter, Joseph Anton Rhomberg, who had been a Professor in Munich since 1827. His circle of friends there included Carl Ebert, Richard Zimmermann, who influenced his style, and Alexander von Kotzebue, a battle painter for whom he provided some landscape backgrounds.

In 1863, he returned to Heilbronn and married Emilie von Lobstein, with whom he had four sons. After his father's retirement, he took over management of the paint factory. That, coupled with increasingly poor health, left him little time for painting during the last decade of his life.
