= Franz Widnmann =

German painter and graphic artist (1846–1910)

- Born: 6 March 1846; Kipfenberg, Kingdom of Bavaria
- Died: 30 August 1910 (aged 64); Rodeneck, County of Tyrol, Austria-Hungary
- Occupations: painter, graphic artist and professor

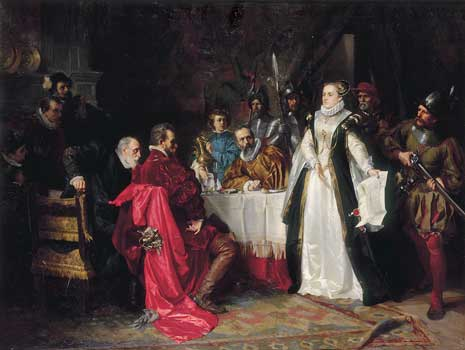
Margaret of Parma before the Duke of Alba by Franz Widnmann (1873)

Franz Widnmann (1846 – 1910) was a German painter and graphic artist, and a professor at the Royal School of Applied Arts in Munich.

Franz Widnmann was born 6 March 1846 at Kipfenberg, a son to the court physician Eduard Widnmann who came from Eichstätt. The family moved from Kipfenberg to Schrobenhausen. When his mother died early, his father married her sister. He first attended school in Schrobenhausen and then at a Latin school in Neuburg.

From 1862 he attended the drawing school of the Verein zur Ausbildung des Gewerbes, and later the Kunstgewerbeschule (School of Arts and Crafts or School of Applied Arts), in Munich, directed by Hermann Dyck. On 30 October 1862 he matriculated at the Munich Academy of Fine Arts for the antique class. His teachers were Karl Theodor von Piloty, Alexander Strähuber, Hermann Anschütz and Alexander Wagner.

His early work was in decorative arts and design, collaborating on the publication Decorative Model published by Thienemann Verlag of Stuttgart. His first painting, Duke Alba at the Castle of Countess Catharina von Schwarzburg, won an award at the 1873 Vienna World's Fair. As a student and, alongside Karl von Piloty, Widnmann was commissioned to decorate the Pringsheim Palace in Berlin. He painted murals for the Munich palace of Prince Leopold of Bavaria and Homecoming from the Hunt for the Schloss St Emmeram, of the Prince of Thurn und Taxis in Regensburg.

A state scholarship enabled Widnmann to spend time in Italy. In the 1880s he was exclusively occupied with works for the palaces of the Bavarian king Ludwig II, especially for Schloss Herrenchiemsee. During 1878 and 1886 he designed figurative decoration for facades, designs for stucco decoration, wall fillings, girandoles, Meissen porcelain chandeliers, crystal chandeliers (executed by Lobmeyr in Vienna), and for clocks, writing instruments, centrepieces, and later, painting commissions. Further commissions were for the Linderhof Palace.

In 1881 he became the 'Royal Professor', and on 1 May 1892 was appointed professor of the life class at the Kunstgewerbeschule. After the death of Ludwig II. in 1886, he concentrated on graphic art, and was influenced in this by early 19th century artists including Alfred Rethel, Moritz von Schwind, Ludwig Richter and Ferdinand Barth. He also provided decorative design for public festivities, certificates, and stamp series for the Bavarian Post Office. In 1894 he designed the stained glass window of the Barfüßerkirche in Augsburg. He exhibited work in the Münchner Glaspalast.

Franz Widnmann died 30 August 1910 in Rodeneck in the Puster Valley. He was buried in the Old South Cemetery Munich.

== Publications ==
- "Franz Widnmann" in Kunst und Handwerk: Zeitschrift für Kunstgewerbe und Kunsthandwerk seit 1851 (Art and craft: Journal for Arts and Crafts since 1851), Bayerischer Kunstgewerbe-Verein (Bavarian Arts and Crafts Association), R. Oldenbourg, Munich (1911), Volume 61 (1910–1911), Issue 12, pp. 361–375
