= Jahnatal =

- Municipality
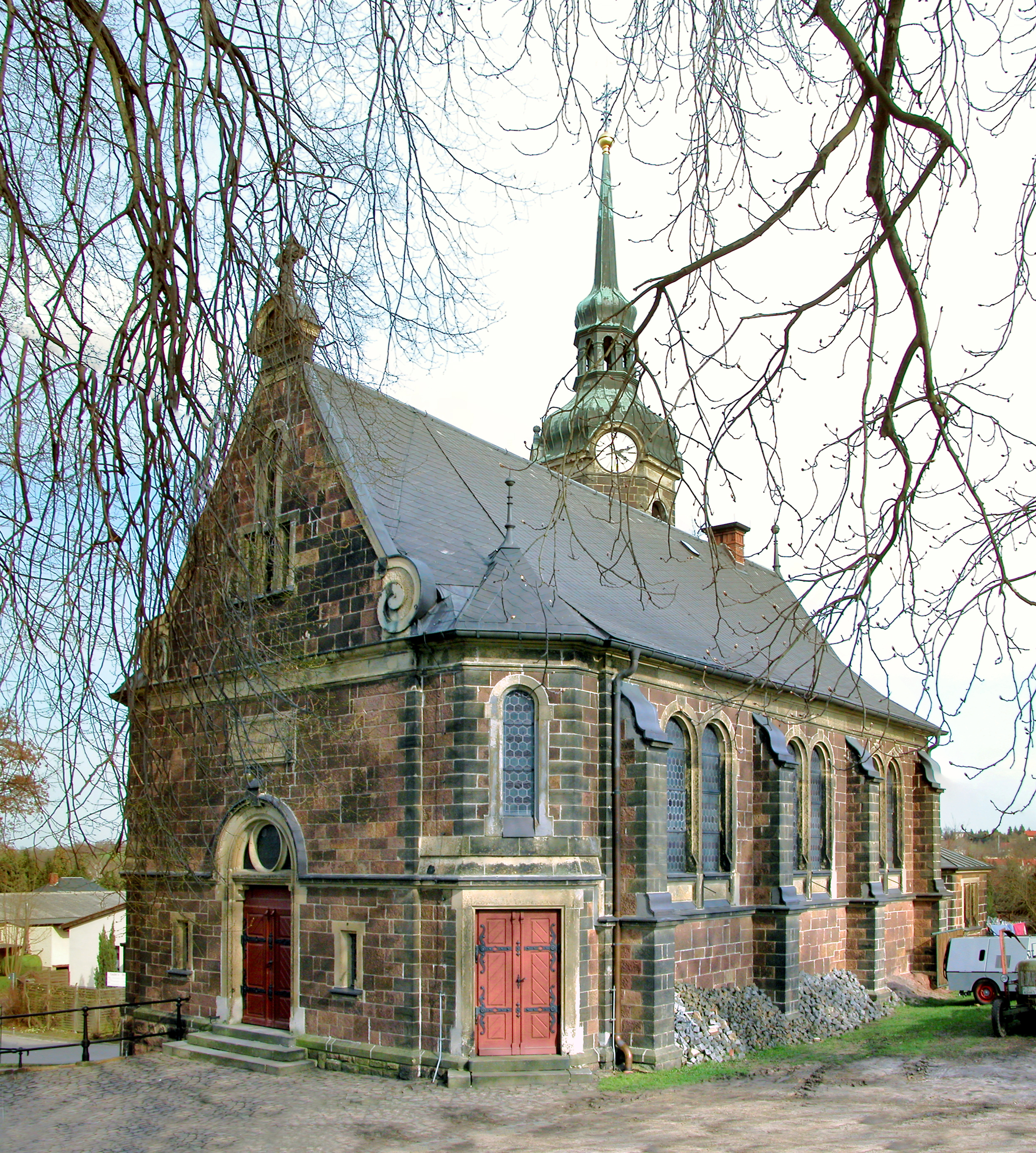
- Holy Trinity Church in Ostrau

- Coat of arms

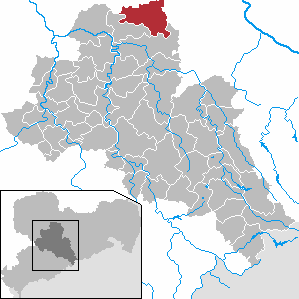
- Location of Jahnatal within Mittelsachsen district
- Interactive map of Jahnatal
- Location within Germany Location within Saxony
- Coordinates: 51°12′N 13°10′E
- Country: Germany
- State: Saxony
- District: Mittelsachsen
- Subdivisions: 37

Government
  - Mayor (2023–30): Dirk Schilling (CDU)

Area
  - Total: 70.96 km^{2} (27.40 sq mi)
- Elevation: 215 m (705 ft)

Population (2025-12-31)
  - Total: 4,738
  - Density: 66.77/km^{2} (172.9/sq mi)
- Time zone: UTC+01:00 (CET)
  - Summer (DST): UTC+02:00 (CEST)
- Postal codes: 04749
- Dialling codes: 034324, 034362
- Vehicle registration: FG

Jahnatal (German pronunciation: [ˈjaːnaˌtaːl], lit. 'Jahna Valley') is a municipality in the district of Mittelsachsen in Saxony in Germany. It was established on 1 January 2023 with the merger of the municipalities of Ostrau and Zschaitz-Ottewig.

== Geography ==
Jahnatal is located 8 km (5.0 mi) north of the town of Döbeln and about 17 km (11 mi) south of Riesa, in the valley of Jahna and the surrounding ridges in the north-west of Lommatzscher Pflege.

=== Boroughs ===
Jahnatal consists of the following villages (Ortsteile):

- Auerschütz
- Auterwitz
- Baderitz
- Beutig
- Binnewitz
- Clanzschwitz
- Delmschütz
- Döhlen
- Dürrweitzschen
- Glaucha
- Goselitz
- Jahna
- Kattnitz
- Kiebitz
- Lüttewitz
- Lützschnitz
- Merschütz
- Mischütz
- Möbertitz
- Münchhof
- Niederlützschera
- Noschkowitz
- Oberlützschera
- Obersteina
- Ostrau
- Ottewig
- Pulsitz
- Rittmitz
- Schlagwitz
- Schmorren
- Schrebitz
- Sömnitz
- Töllschütz
- Trebanitz
- Zschaitz
- Zschochau
- Zunschwitz

== History ==
On 1 January 2023, the municipalities of Ostrau and Zschaitz-Ottewig merged to form the new municipality of Jahnatal.
