= Disappearance of Rebecca Reusch =

Unsolved German 2019 missing person case

- Picture of Rebecca Reusch used by her family on the missing person poster
- Date: 18 February 2019
- Location: Britz, Berlin, Germany
- Type: Disappearance
- Motive: Unknown

The disappearance of Rebecca Reusch is an unsolved missing person case from Berlin, Germany. Rebecca Reusch was last seen alive on the night of 17 February 2019. She did not turn up at school the next day and was reported missing by her parents on the afternoon of 18 February. No body has been found, but police believe that she was killed.

Reusch's disappearance attracted sustained press coverage in Germany, and has been compared to the disappearance of Madeleine McCann in 2007. In addition, her case has been heavily discussed on social media and in true-crime communities.

== Rebecca Reusch ==
Rebecca Reusch was born on 21 September 2003 in Berlin, Germany to Brigitte and Bernd Reusch. At the time of her disappearance, she was living with her parents in Britz; a locality within the Berlin borough of Neukölln. She has two older sisters Jessica and Vivien who had already moved out and were living with their respective partners and young children. According to her parents, Reusch was not in a committed relationship at the time of her disappearance. She was a tenth-grade student at the Walter-Gropius-Schule in the nearby Gropiusstadt locality of Neukölln. Reusch is described as an avid fan of the Korean music group BTS.

== Disappearance ==
=== 17 February ===
Rebecca Reusch spent the evening of Sunday, 17 February 2019, with her eldest sister. This sister lived with her husband and daughter in their own house in the south of Britz. She was alone with her child that evening as her husband was at a party with colleagues. Reusch wanted to sleep on the couch in the living room and go straight to school on Monday morning, which had an unscheduled late start that day.

=== 18 February ===
Reusch's brother-in-law returned from the party at around 05:45 and went to bed. At 07:00, the sister left the house with her daughter to go to work. At 07:15, Reusch's mother tried to call her daughter, but only reached voicemail. An analysis of Rebecca's mobile phone showed that it was last logged into the home network at 07:46. At 08:25, the mother called a second time, but again only reached voicemail.

At some point between 07:00 and 07:46, Reusch had sent a Snapchat photo to a friend of hers. Since Snapchat photos are automatically deleted after they are opened, the exact time it was taken is unknown. This message was seen by that friend at 08:15. In the photo, she is said to be standing in a corridor while wearing a hoodie with the label BTS in the front and Rap Monster on the back, a pink plush jacket, ripped jeans and black and white Vans trainers.

At 09:40, Reusch failed to turn up for school. When she did not return home in the afternoon, her parents reported their daughter missing. Some of Reusch's personal belongings also appeared to have gone missing, including the clothes she was wearing in the Snapchat photo that morning, her Vans backpack, her pink handbag, her purse with the initials MK, her mobile phone and a pink Fuji Instax Mini 9. A purple blanket from her sister's household was also missing.

== Investigations ==
1 Reusch's last known location on 18 February
2 Brother-in-law's car identified on 18 and 19 February
3 Police search on 7–9 March
4 Police search on 16–29 March
5 Police search on 18–19 March
6 Police search on 25 March
7 Police search on 20-21 October 2025

Reusch's parents reported their daughter missing to the police on 18 February and began searching for her themselves. On 21 February, the police officially declared her missing and on 23 February, the case was already handed over to the homicide squad. On 28 February, police arrested Reusch's brother-in-law for questioning but had to release him again on 1 March. He was arrested again on 4 March, but released for a second time on 22 March.

On 6 March 2019, leading investigator Michael Hoffmann from the Landeskriminalamt Berlin appeared at short notice on the ZDF programme Aktenzeichen XY ... ungelöst to reach possible witnesses of Reusch's disappearance. Hoffmann said that the brother-in-law's vehicle, a pink Renault Twingo, had been identified by an automatic number-plate recognition system on the A12 motorway - once on the morning of 18 February and a second time on the evening of 19 February. Hoffmann also presented his mug shots during the programme, a decision that was criticised by the suspect's lawyers. During March 2019, forests and lakes in the vicinity of the A12 motorway were searched intensively, but no further clues to Reusch's whereabouts were found.

In 2020, the prosecution submitted a request to Google to retrieve data from both Reusch and her brother-in-law, that are stored in a Google data center in Dublin. The data were delivered in early 2021 and revealed that the brother-in-law had accessed strangulation pornography and BDSM content in the early morning of February 18. This stood as a contradiction to his statement of being asleep at this time.

In April 2023, police searched the home of Reusch's brother-in-law. They carried out acoustic tests and reportedly searched for objects that could be used to carry out a strangulation.

In October 2025 investigators searched properties in Tauche and Rietz-Neuendorf, Brandenburg belonging to the brother-in-law’s grandparents. The operation was conducted jointly by local police with the Federal Criminal Police Office (BKA) and relied on drones, a ground-penetrating radar, cadaver dogs, an excavator and over 100 agents. Investigators said they still believed Reusch never left the house alive and that there are indications the brother-in-law may have killed her and hidden her body and personal belongings at one of the searched locations, at least temporarily.

== Theories ==
Police and prosecution have stated several times that Reusch's brother-in-law is their main and only suspect in her disappearance. On the other hand, Reusch's family has repeatedly affirmed that they believe in his innocence. Due to the high profile of the case, numerous theories have been discussed in the press, on social media and in true-crime communities. These include that she ran away, fell victim to an online predator, was killed by an unknown perpetrator or became a victim of trafficking.

=== Reusch's brother-in-law ===
Reusch's brother-in-law was the only person known to have been in the house with her that morning. This is significant as this was the last time Reusch's mobile phone was ever connected to an access point and police have stated several times that they do not believe Reusch left the house alive that day. Furthermore, he initially claimed to have slept that morning, but police were able to establish that he had searched for pornographic material related to bondage and strangulation practices.

Police could also establish that the suspect was driving on the A12 motorway from Berlin in the direction of Frankfurt (Oder) both in the morning of 18 February and in the late evening of 19 February. He did not provide any reasons for his journeys. Reusch's father, who supports his son-in-law, told RTL in an interview: "The whole thing is connected to something else, but I'm not allowed to say". This led to speculation in the media as to whether the trips toward Poland were connected to drug trafficking. Statements made by the suspect's sister in an interview also suggest this explanation.

This trip on the A12 motorway has also been connected to a witness statement according to which a raspberry-red Renault Twingo was seen in a wooded area near Kummersdorf on 18 February. This description matches the vehicle used by the suspect. The statement was further supported by the testimony of two female horse riders who had seen a conspicuous man there around midday. The wooded area was then searched, but no relevant leads were found.

=== Other theories ===
Theories that do not include Reusch's brother-in-law all assume that she left the house alive on the morning of 18 February. They are supported by a number of witnesses who claim to have seen Reusch after 07:45. One such witness claims to have seen Reusch in the late morning of 18 February 2019. According to her testimony, Reusch was walking on the street near Reusch's sister’s house. She recalled that the girl had a blanket with her, even though it had rained the day before and the ground was still wet and therefore not suitable for a picnic. However, the weather records from 17 February contradict the witness's statement, as it was completely dry on that day. Other witnesses claimed to have seen Reusch at a nearby bus stop and on a number 171 bus during the course of 18 February. However, the police analysed the surveillance cameras near the bus stops and were unable to confirm these sightings.

==== BTS-related meeting ====
Reusch was known to be an avid fan of the Korean music group BTS. Fans of this group are known to create and share social media content on birthdays of group members and 18 February is the birthday of one of its members. Reusch's family has, therefore, opined that she may have left the house earlier to possibly meet with other fans. This theory has been connected to the missing camera and purple blanket.

==== Internet acquaintance ====
Both family and friends of Reusch have voiced suspicion about an internet acquaintance; a boy Reusch's age. It was suspected that Reusch may have secretly met up with him on 18 February. The suspicion against him was seemingly substantiated as he deleted his social media profiles shortly after the case became public. However, the public prosecutor's office has confirmed that police followed up on the lead and were ultimately able to rule him out as a suspect.

== Media coverage ==
The disappearance of Rebecca Reusch has attracted substantial media attention in Germany and triggered wide speculation. It has been described as "one of the most puzzling criminal cases in Germany", or "one of the most spectacular missing persons cases in Germany". Missing persons expert Peter Jamin called it the "most highly publicised case in Germany" and added that "[o]nly the case of Maddie McCann has caused a bigger sensation."

On 6 March 2019, the case was presented in the show Aktenzeichen XY ... ungelöst. Photos of the main suspect were also shown there. ZDF presenter Rudi Cerne spoke of the "case that is keeping the whole of Germany [...] busy". After the broadcast, over 300 tips were received from the public, totalling over 700 by 7 March 2019. By 13 April 2023, the police had received a total of over 3,000 tips.

External image
- Altered image of Reusch as used by the Berlin Police in the search

Berlin Police was criticised by a number of media outlets for using a heavily altered image during the search. This image was taken from Reusch's Instagram account and was altered by the account owner using a beauty filter to create, what has been described as, a Lolita look. Although the image is seen as a poor likeness of Reusch and could therefore hamper the search effort, it is widely used by the media itself and has been cited as a factor in the high-profile her case has received. As of 2024, this altered image is still the only portrait of Reusch used by the police in the search.

Media also reflected on the strained relationship between Reusch's family and police. While the police expressed their frustration at the perceived lack of cooperation, Reusch's family criticised the strong focus of the police on Reusch's brother-in-law, whom they believe to be innocent. Josef Wilfling, long-time head of the Munich homicide squad, used his experience from the Engelbrecht case to explain that talking with relatives of a missing person is a difficult and conflict-prone balancing act for homicide investigators.

== See also ==
- List of people who disappeared mysteriously (2000–present)
- Death of Sonja Engelbrecht
