= Peter Leibing =

German photographer

- Leibing's famous photograph of Conrad Schumann jumping a barbed wire fence during construction of the Berlin Wall.
- Born: Peter Leibing; 1941; Hamburg, Nazi Germany
- Died: November 2, 2008 (aged 66–67)
- Occupation: Photographer
- Known for: Photograph of Conrad Schumann jumping over the Berlin Wall

Peter Leibing (1941 – November 2, 2008) was a German photographer known for his 1961 photographs of escaping East German border guard, Conrad Schumann jumping a barbed wire fence during construction of the Berlin Wall.

Leibing was born in Hamburg in 1941. On 15 August 1961 Leibing, working for the Hamburg picture agency Contiepress, had been tipped by police that an East German border guard might escape the Berlin Wall, then in its third day of construction. At that stage of construction, the Berlin Wall was only a low barbed-wire fence. As people on the Western side shouted Komm rüber! ("come over"), Leibing captured a photograph of Schumann jumping a barbed wire fence and making his escape. The photo became a well-known image of the Cold War and won the Overseas Press Club Best Photograph award for 1961.

Leibing continued to work as a photographer, later as photo editor until retirement, both as a police photographer and reporter for the Hamburger Echo, the Hamburger Morgenpost, and Hamburger Abendblatt.

Leibing died on November 2, 2008. The rights to his famous photograph of the escaping East German border guard currently belong to Conibeta GmbH.
