= Zschaitz-Ottewig =

- Municipality
- Interactive map of Zschaitz-Ottewig
- Location within Germany Location within Saxony
- Coordinates: 51°10′30″N 13°12′0″E
- Country: Germany
- State: Saxony
- District: Mittelsachsen
- Disbanded: 2023
- Subdivisions: 12

Area
  - Total: 18.26 km^{2} (7.05 sq mi)
- Elevation: 141 m (463 ft)

Population (2021-12-31)
  - Total: 1,313
  - Density: 71.91/km^{2} (186.2/sq mi)
- Time zone: UTC+01:00 (CET)
  - Summer (DST): UTC+02:00 (CEST)
- Postal codes: 04720
- Dialling codes: 034324

Zschaitz-Ottewig (German pronunciation: [ˈtʃaɪts ˈʔɔtəvɪç]) is a former municipality in the district of Mittelsachsen, in Saxony, Germany. On 1 January 2023, it was merged with Ostrau to form the new municipality of Jahnatal.

== Historical population (since 1990) ==
Recorded on 31 December unless otherwise noted:

Year	Population
1990	1,478 *
2000	1,598
2005	1,480

Year	Population
2007	1,417
2009	1,383
2010	1,357

* 3 October
