= Joseph Anton Rhomberg =

Austrian-born German painter, illustrator and graphic artist

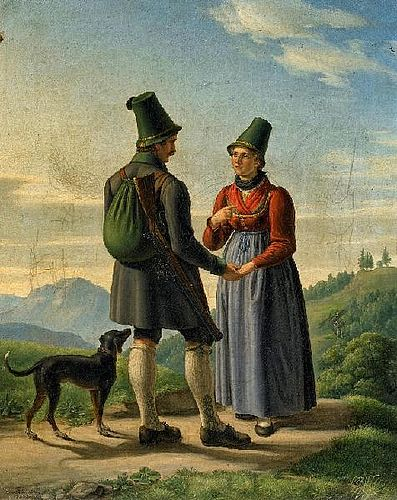
A Hunter and a Dairy Maid

Joseph Anton Rhomberg (24 September 1786, Dornbirn - 3 December 1853, Munich) was an Austrian-born German painter, illustrator and graphic artist.

== Biography ==
Rhomberg was the youngest son of ten children. He was born to an entrepreneurial family that dealt in textiles, although they suffered financial hardships throughout much of his youth, and he received little education. His father, Johannes Rhomberg (1733–1795), worked as a local portrait painter, which inspired him to seek his career elsewhere.

In 1802, he began his art studies at the Academy of Fine Arts Vienna. From 1809 to 1816, he was enrolled at the Academy of Fine Arts, Munich, where he studied with Robert von Langer, Joseph Hauber, the history painter, Andreas Seidl and Moritz Kellerhoven. He had his first exhibition there in 1814.

From 1817 to 1822, he lived in Vienna, painting portraits of prominent people. In 1823, he returned to Munich and, in 1827, became a professor of drawing at the Technical University. His notable students there included Franz Xaver Bobleter, Gebhard Flatz, Theodor Horschelt, Friedrich Salzer and Alexander Strähuber. During this period, he specialized in religious art.

His son, Hanno, also became a painter.

== Sources ==
- Josef Anton Rhomberg @ Deutsche Biographie
- "Rhomberg, Josef Anton". In: Österreichisches Biographisches Lexikon 1815–1950 (ÖBL). Vol. 9, Austrian Academy of Sciences, Vienna 1988, ISBN 3-7001-1483-4, p. 115.
- Georg Kaspar Nagler: Neues allgemeines Künstler-Lexicon oder Nachrichten von dem Leben und den Werken der Maler, Bildhauer, Baumeister, Kupferstecher, Formschneider, Lithographen, Zeichner, Medailleure, Elfenbeinarbeiter, etc, 1843, Verlag Fleischmann (Online @ Google Books)
