= St. Ludwig's Church, Celle =

Coordinates: 52°37′13″N 10°4′44″E

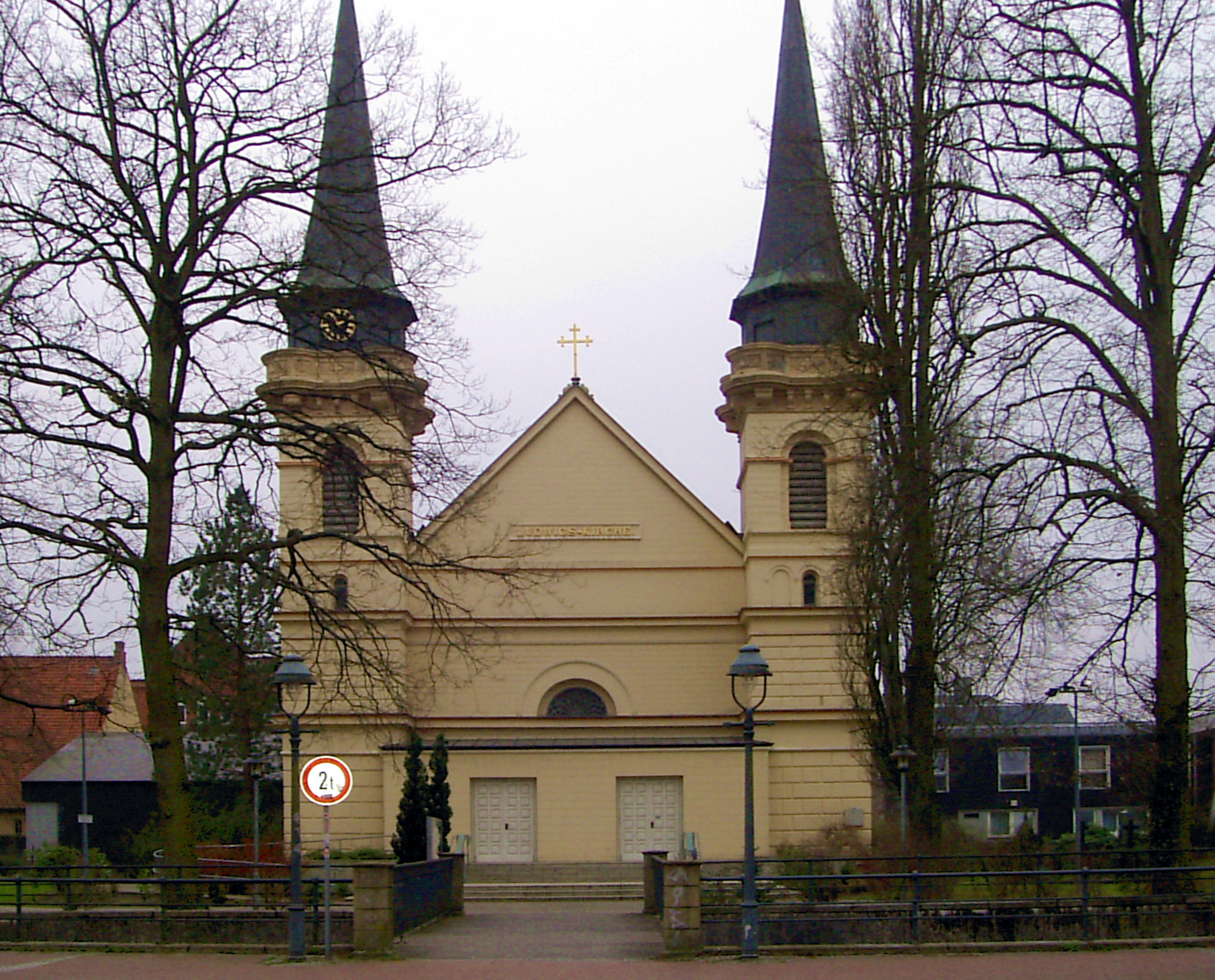
View of St. Ludwig from the French Garden

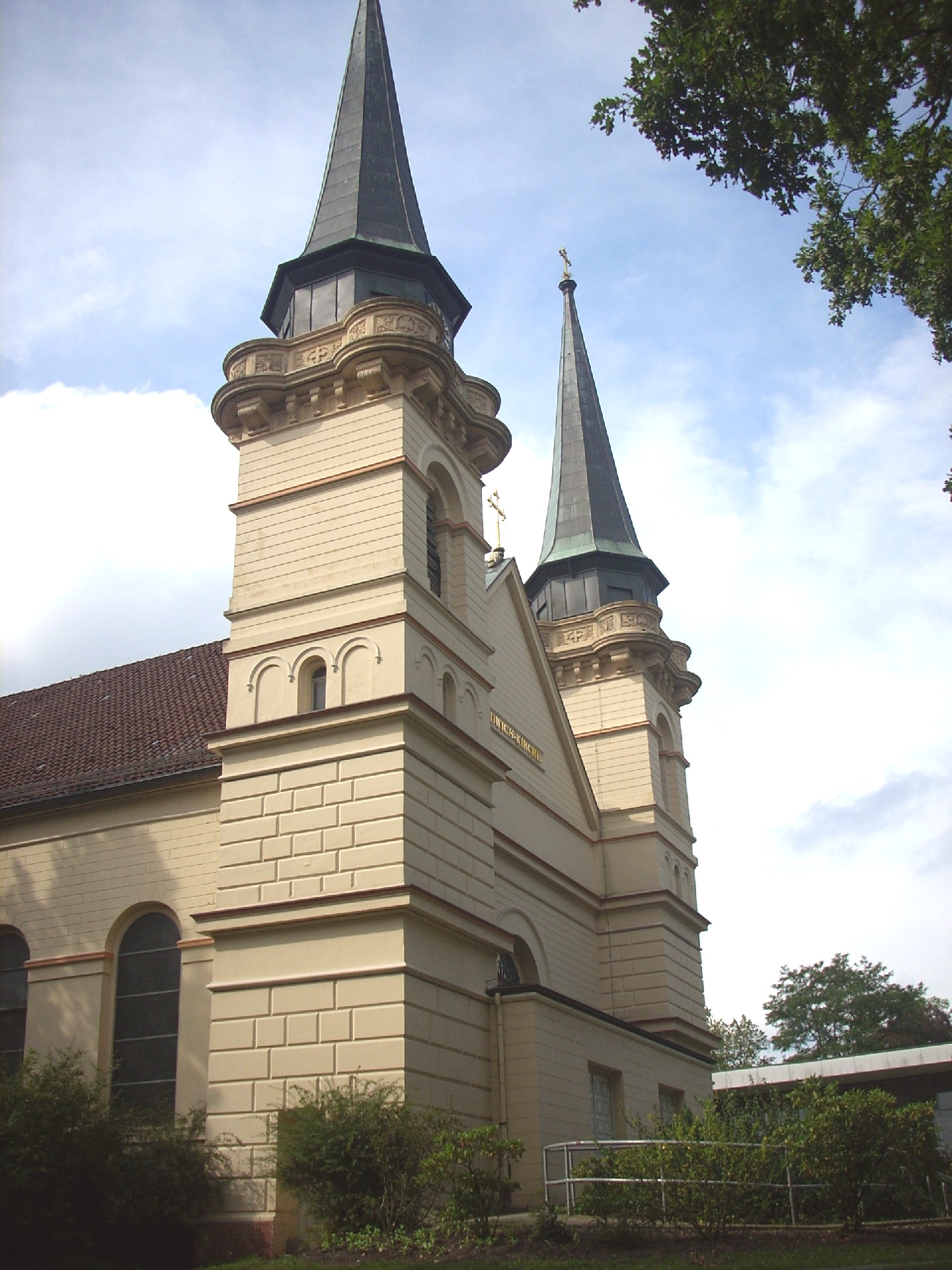
Tower frontage

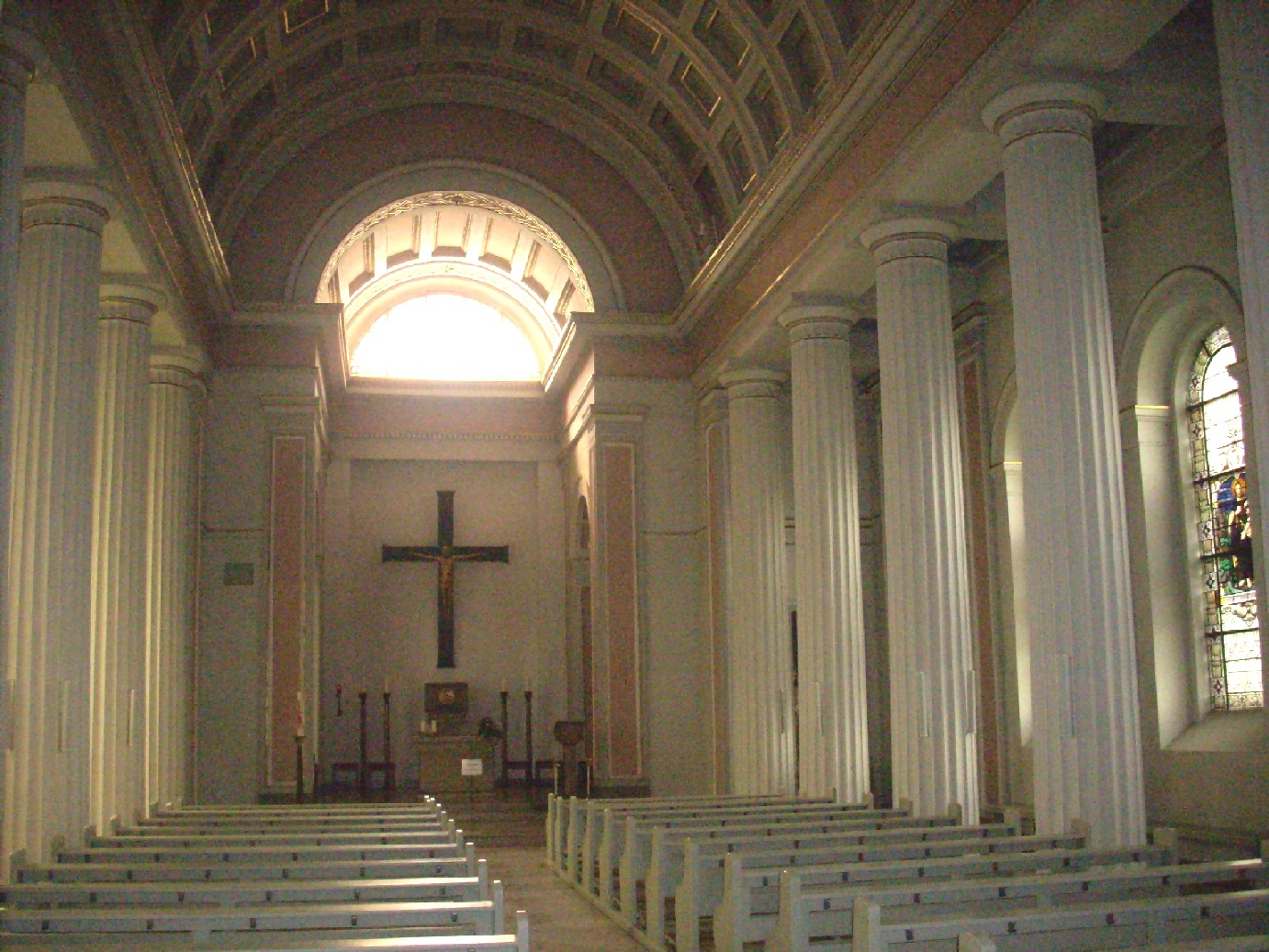
The interior

St. Ludwig ("St Louis") is the main Catholic church in the town of Celle in the German state of Lower Saxony. It was consecrated in 1838 and was the third catholic parish church of the new diocese of Hildesheim which was authorised by papal bull and was outside of the former bishopric of Hildesheim and Archbishopric of Mainz. It followed in the footsteps of the first two churches: St Clemens in Hanover and St Michael in Göttingen. Its jurisdiction extends as far as the North Sea coast.

Louis the Holy, King of France, known as St Louis (German: Ludwig), was chosen as the patron saint – in deference to King Ludwig I of Bavaria, who had supported its construction with money and a collection in Bavaria.

The Church of St Ludwig (Ludwigskirche) stands on the western edge of the town centre, outside the historic Altstadt. The central axis of the French Garden runs directly to the imposing frontage of the church.

== Description ==
St. Ludwig is an example of pure neoclassicism. Only the bases of the towers, completed in 1881, show signs of a Romantic heritage.

The interior of the church is a three-aisled hall. The side aisles are flat-roofed, whilst a coffered barrel vault stretches over the main, central aisle, supported on twelve, tall, white, fluted columns. Pastel pink walls and narrow gold piping set them off with shades of colour.

The sanctuary is a narrow, only slightly raised extension of the main aisle with flat walls, that is dominated by the tabernacle and a large crucifix, reminiscent of the early Romantic period. In front of it stand the altar and ambon from the modern period.

The semi-circular Trinity window in the vault of the sanctuary and the stained glass windows of the side aisles are works of the late 19th century.

On 29 June 1986 the St Peter and St Paul Chapel (Peter-und-Paul-Kapelle), on the southwest side of the church, was consecrated, and acts as a place for quiet contemplation and weekday services. A baroque altarpiece contrasts effectively with the contemporary architecture and furnishings.

== History ==
Since the Reformation there had only been individual Catholics in Celle, mostly foreigners in diplomatic service or in court positions. In 1678 Niels Stensen initiated the commissioning of a permanent pastor for them. In 1710 a private house outside the town was converted into a chapel, that was placed under the protection of the apostle Peter and Paul and consecrated by Agostino Steffani. A hundred years later the idea of constructing a proper church took root. The design of the Church of St Ludwig came from the Lübeck architect Spetzler, the towers were the work of C. W. Hase and the decoration was by Wilhelm Clausing.
