= Ostrau, Mittelsachsen =

Ostrau
- Part of Jahnatal
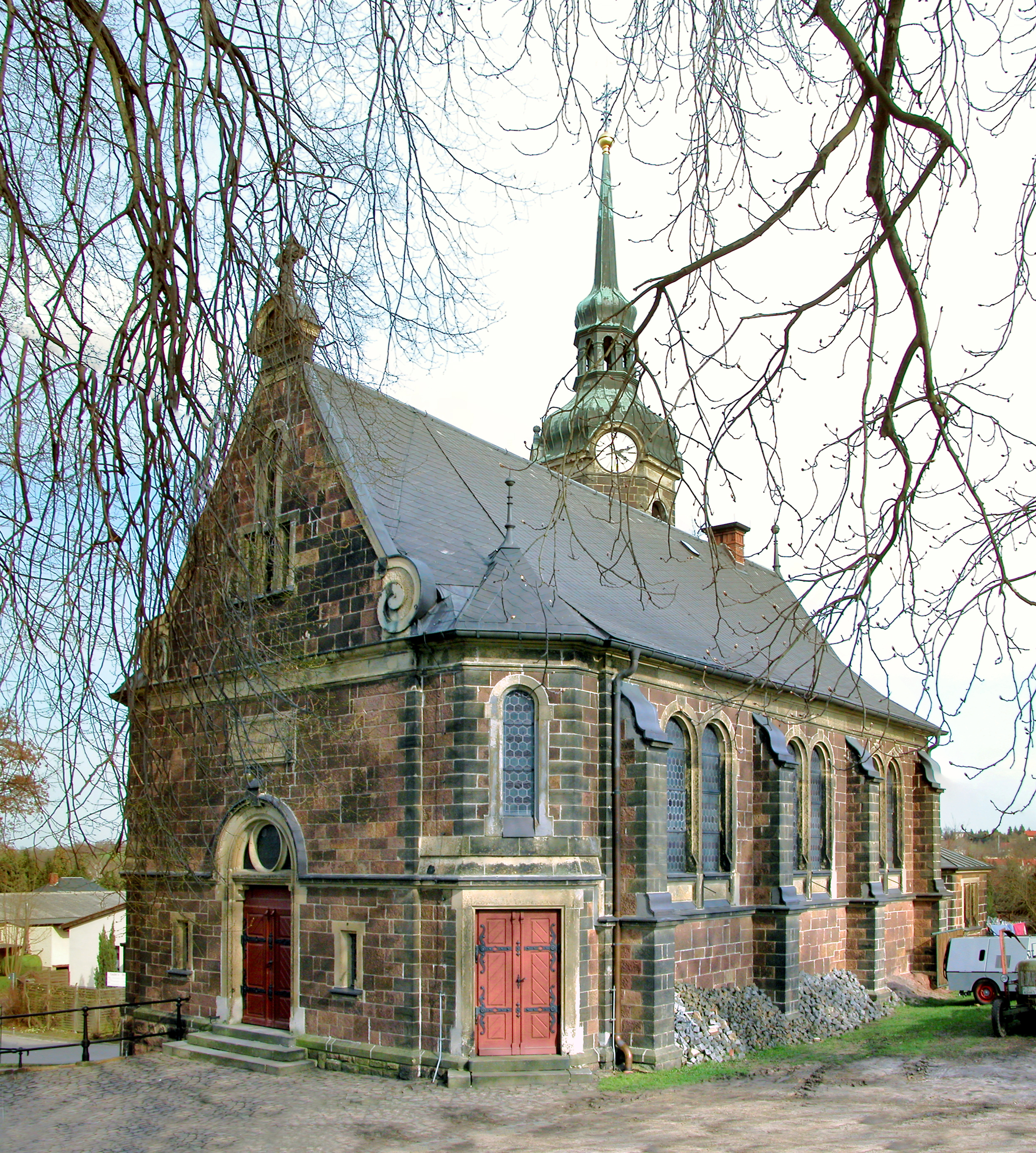
- Holy Trinity Church

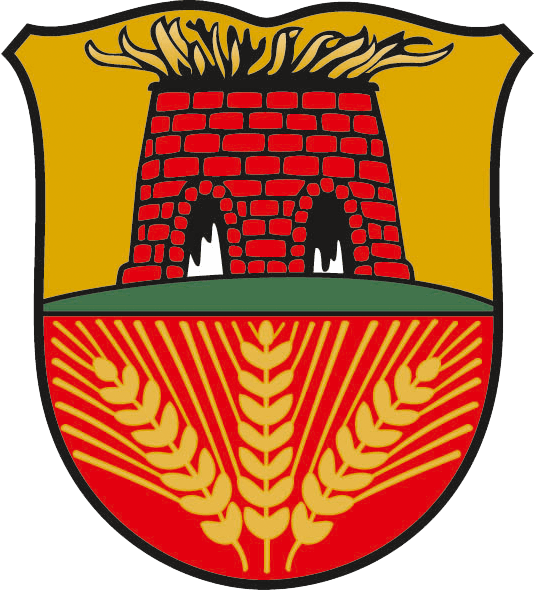
- Coat of arms
- Interactive map of Ostrau
- Location within Germany Location within Saxony
- Coordinates: 51°12′N 13°10′E
- Country: Germany
- State: Saxony
- District: Mittelsachsen
- Municipality: Jahnatal
- Subdivisions: 27

Area
  - Total: 52.7 km^{2} (20.3 sq mi)
- Elevation: 171 m (561 ft)

Population (2021-12-31)
  - Total: 3,500
  - Density: 66/km^{2} (170/sq mi)
- Time zone: UTC+01:00 (CET)
  - Summer (DST): UTC+02:00 (CEST)
- Postal codes: 04749
- Dialling codes: 034324

Ostrau (German pronunciation: [ˈɔstʁaʊ]) is a village and a former municipality in the district of Mittelsachsen in Saxony in Germany. On 1 January 2023, it was merged with Zschaitz-Ottewig to form the new municipality of Jahnatal.

== Notable people ==
- Konrad Schumann
- Jaki Liebezeit
