= Stiglmaierplatz =

Public square in Munich, Germany

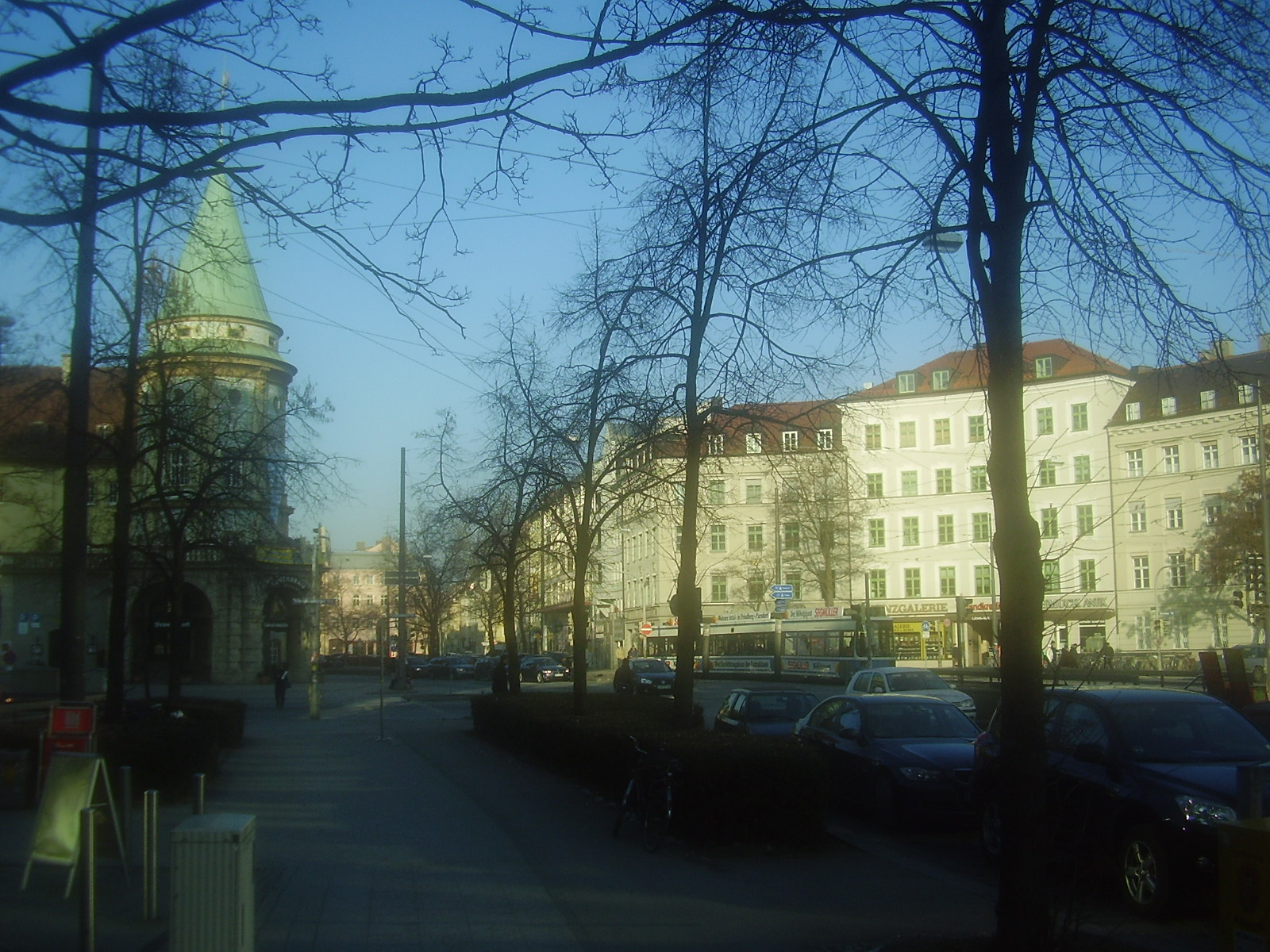
Stiglmaierplatz

Stiglmaierplatz is a square in the Munich district of Maxvorstadt. It was named in 1845 after the artist Johann Baptist Stiglmaier and was previously the Kronprinzenplatz and since 1826 it was known as the Ludwigplatz.

== Traffic ==
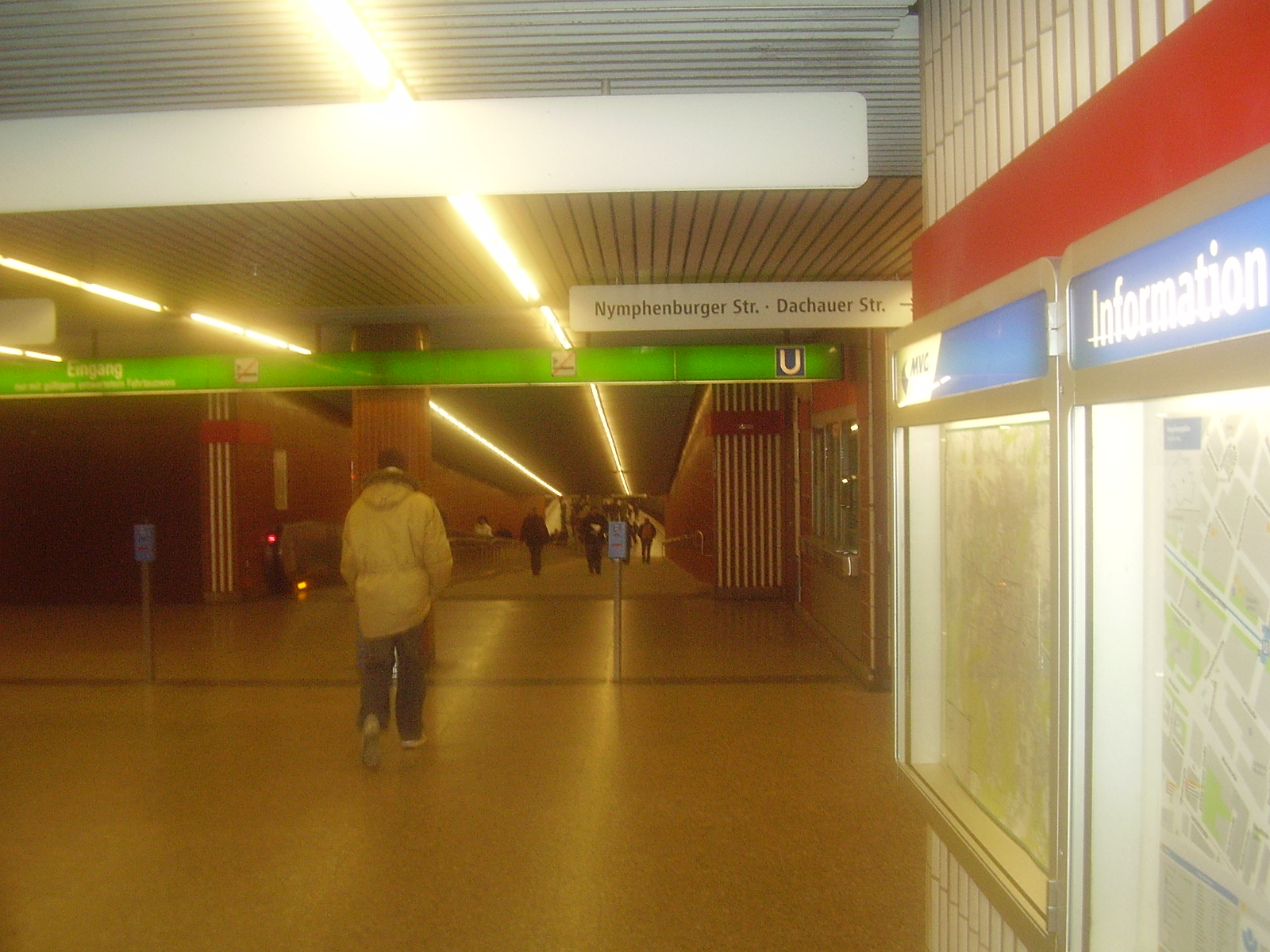
Departure from Stiglmaierplatz to the subway tracks

Today, Stiglmaierplatz is crossed in a northwestern direction by Dachauer Straße; shortly before which the multi-lane traffic of Seidlstraße flows into it at the level of the tram train station to the south and ends here. From the east, Brienner Straße ends at Stiglmaierplatz and merges into Nymphenburger Straße to the west. Schleißheimer Straße begins in the northeast. The square can be reached by public transport via subway lines 1 and 7 and tram lines 20, 21 and 22.

== History ==
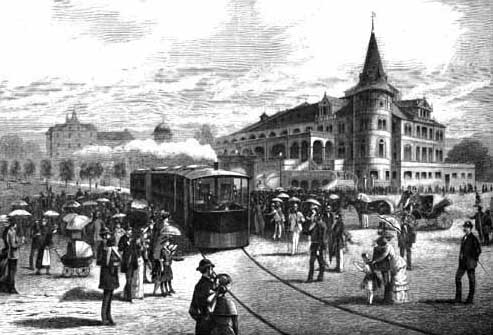
around 1885

In the Middle Ages the square lay on a road leading from the Neuhauser Tor to Schleißheim and at the latest from the end of the 14th century served as a starting point for horse races on the so-called Rennweg, which ran where today's Schleißheimer Straße was built. From 1448 the races were held annually during the Jakobidult on the route from the Neuhauser Tor in the direction of Feldmoching, which was also known as the Rennweg until 1878. Not far north of today's Stiglmaierplatz, the country estate Wiesenfeld was located from the end of the 18th century.

On the 8th of November in both 1942 and 1943, (the 19th and 20th anniversary of the Munich Putsch) Adolf Hitler would make two speeches. The first (in 1942), was the "Stalingrad speech," made to senior Nazi Party officials in regard to the height of the fighting in Stalingrad. The latter (in 1943), is credited as his last Beer Hall speech. In it, he would comment that Germany "shall go on fighting" and claimed that Germany was in a better position than the start of the war.
