= Kipfenberg =

- Municipality
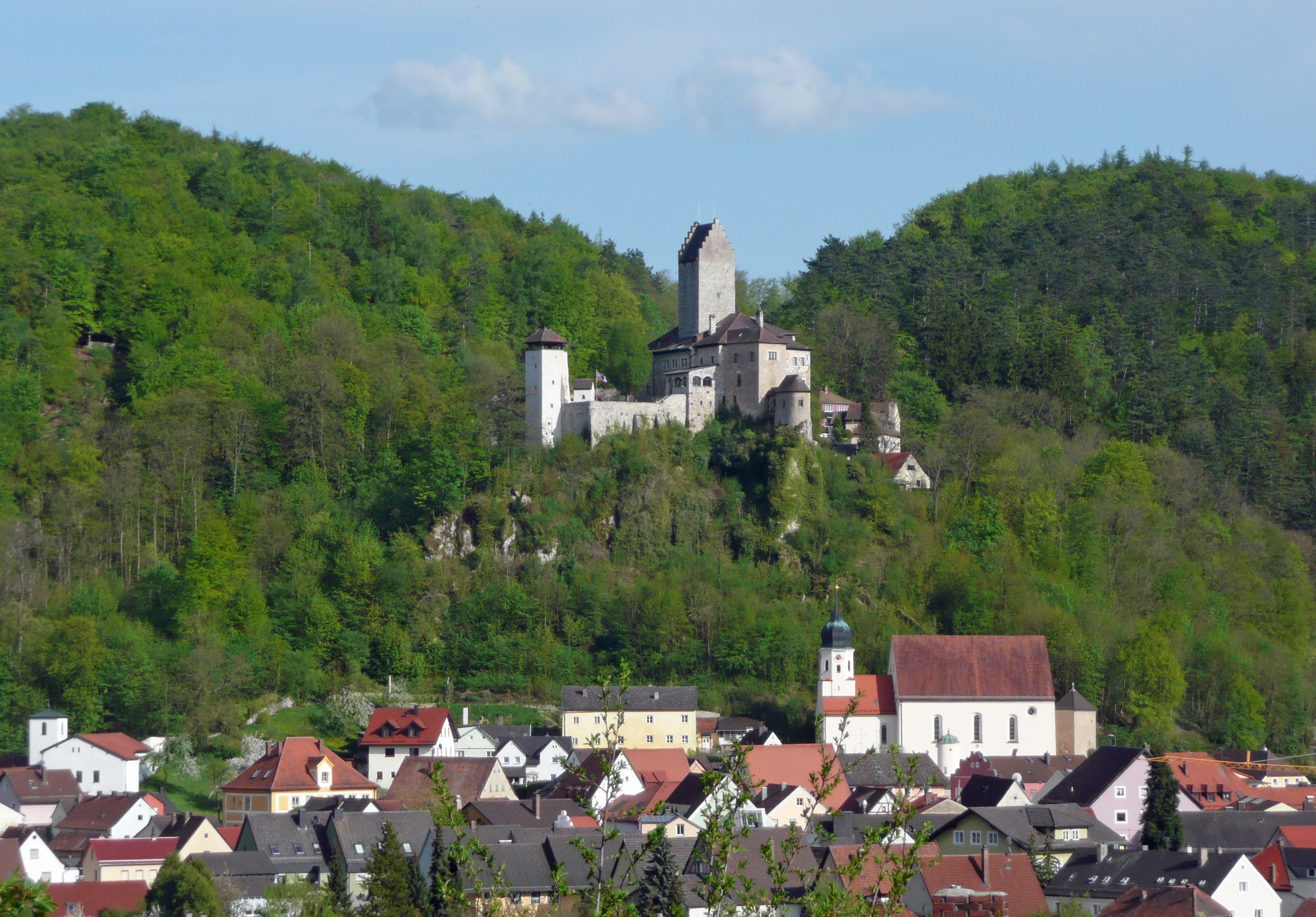
- Kipfenberg with the Kipfenberg Castle seen from northwest

- Coat of arms

- Location of Kipfenberg within Eichstätt district
- Interactive map of Kipfenberg
- Location within Germany Location within Bavaria
- Coordinates: 48°56′58″N 11°23′42″E
- Country: Germany
- State: Bavaria
- Admin. region: Oberbayern
- District: Eichstätt
- Subdivisions: 16 Ortsteile

Government
  - Mayor (2020–26): Christian Wagner (SPD)

Area
  - Total: 81.43 km^{2} (31.44 sq mi)
- Elevation: 378 m (1,240 ft)

Population (2025-12-31)
  - Total: 5,835
  - Density: 71.66/km^{2} (185.6/sq mi)
- Time zone: UTC+01:00 (CET)
  - Summer (DST): UTC+02:00 (CEST)
- Postal codes: 85110
- Dialling codes: 08465
- Vehicle registration: EI
- Website: www.kipfenberg.de

Kipfenberg is a town and municipality in the district of Eichstätt in Bavaria, Germany. It is known for its hillside castle and fortress, and for being the geographical centre of Bavaria. The river Altmühl flows through the municipality and its market town of Kipfenberg.

Franz Widnmann (1846–1910), painter, graphic artist, and professor at the Royal School of Applied Arts in Munich, was born at Kipfenberg. Konrad Schumann (1942–1998), a former soldier for East Berlin hanged himself in an orchard in Kipfenberg.

== Communities ==
Community	Population
Kipfenberg	1709
Arnsberg	325
Attenzell	241
Biberg	348
Böhming	599
Buch	174
Dunsdorf	188
Grösdorf	356
Hirnstetten	179
Irlahüll	250
Kemathen	036
Krut	065
Oberemmendorf	110
Pfahldorf	431
Schambach	060
Schelldorf	564

== Mayors ==
Years	Name	Party
–1996	Christian Weiß	CSU
1996–2014	Rainer Richter	SPD
since 2014	Christian Wagner	SPD
