= Hans Meiser (journalist) =

German television and radio presenter and journalist (1946–2023)

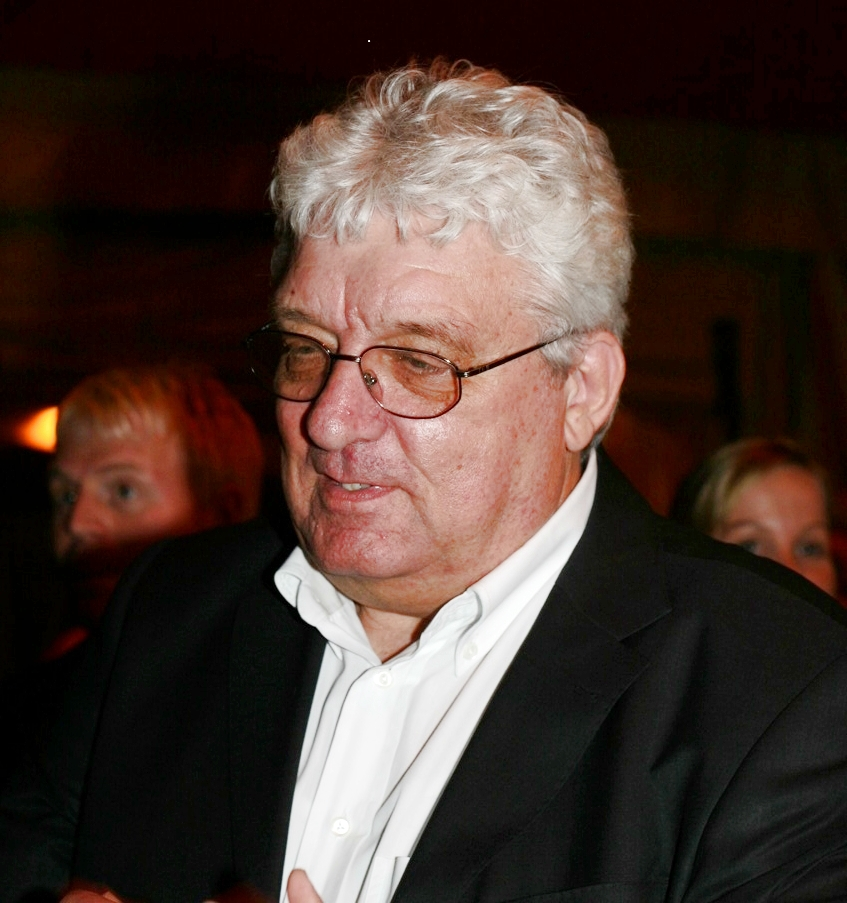
- Meiser in 2007
- Born: 20 August 1946; Bad Rothenfelde, Lower Saxony, Germany
- Died: 30 October 2023 (aged 77); Scharbeutz, Schleswig-Holstein, Germany
- Occupation: Journalist

Hans-Joachim Meiser (20 August 1946 – 30 October 2023) was a German journalist and television and radio presenter. He has been described as "a formative figure in German TV history", who "helped to break up and change news television".

== Life and career ==
Born in Bad Rothenfelde, Meiser started his career on radio, and made his television debut as a newscaster in 1984. He was best known for his RTL talk show Hans Meiser, broadcast between 1992 and 2001, which in its first seasons reached audience shares of up to 40 percent. The show was the first daily afternoon talk show broadcast in Germany, and led to numerous imitations, as well as to criticism for its sensationalistic approach. He later hosted a number of other programmes, notably 7vor7 and Dumm gelaufen. His later years were marked by various controversies, for writing articles which embraced conspiracy theories and for advertising fraudulent financial products.

During his career Meiser received several awards, including a Bambi Award and a Goldene Kamera. He died of heart failure on 30 October 2023, at the age of 77.
