= Jahna =

River in Germany

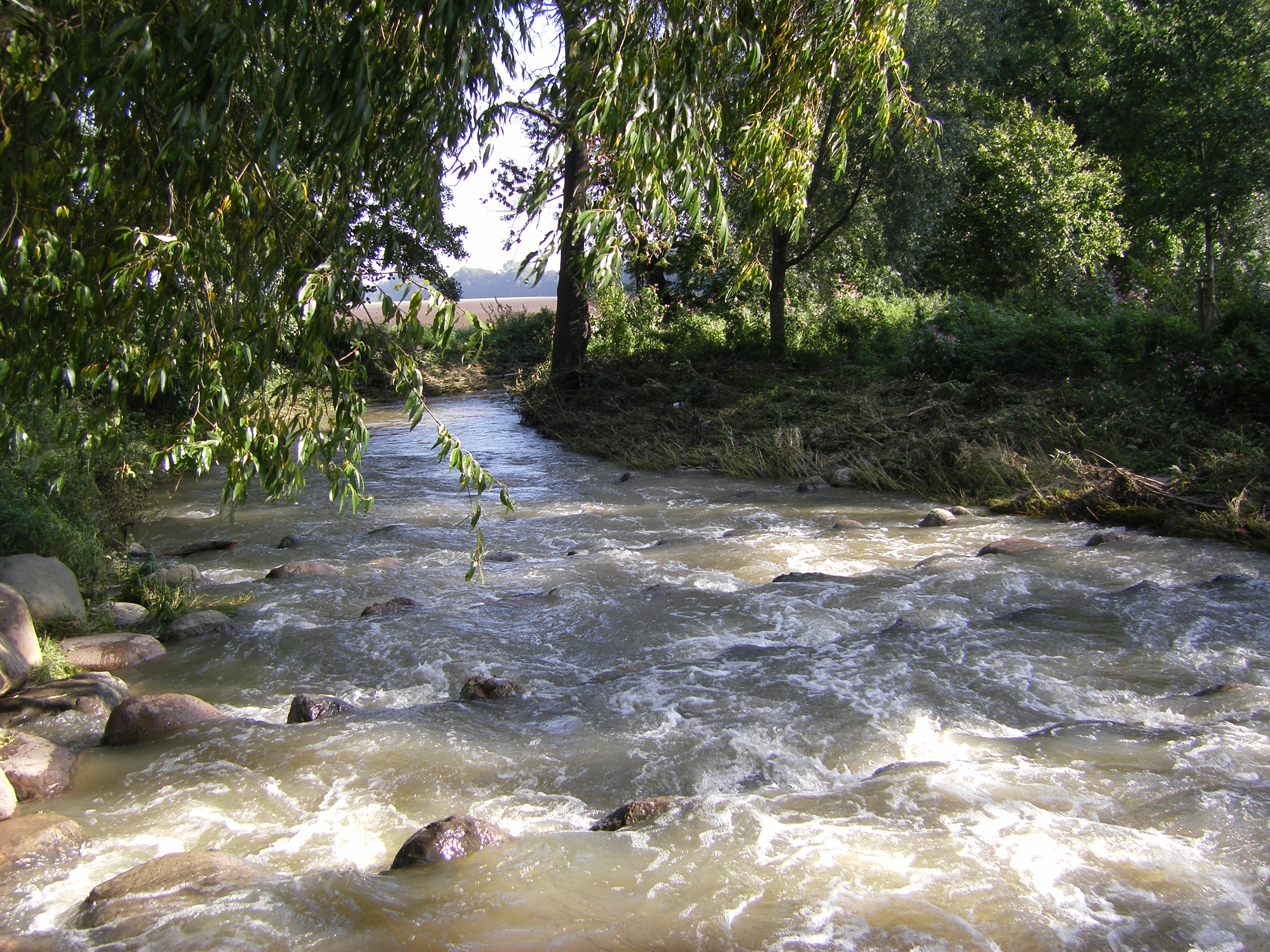

Location
- Country: Germany
- States: Saxony

Physical characteristics
- Mouth
  - location: Elbe
  - coordinates: 51.3065°N 13.3102°E

Basin features
- Progression: Elbe→ North Sea

The Jahna (German pronunciation: [ˈjaːna]) is a river of Saxony, Germany. It is a left tributary of the Elbe, which it joins in Riesa.

== See also ==
- List of rivers of Saxony
