= Großenhain Berliner Bahnhof =

Railway station in Großenhain, Germany

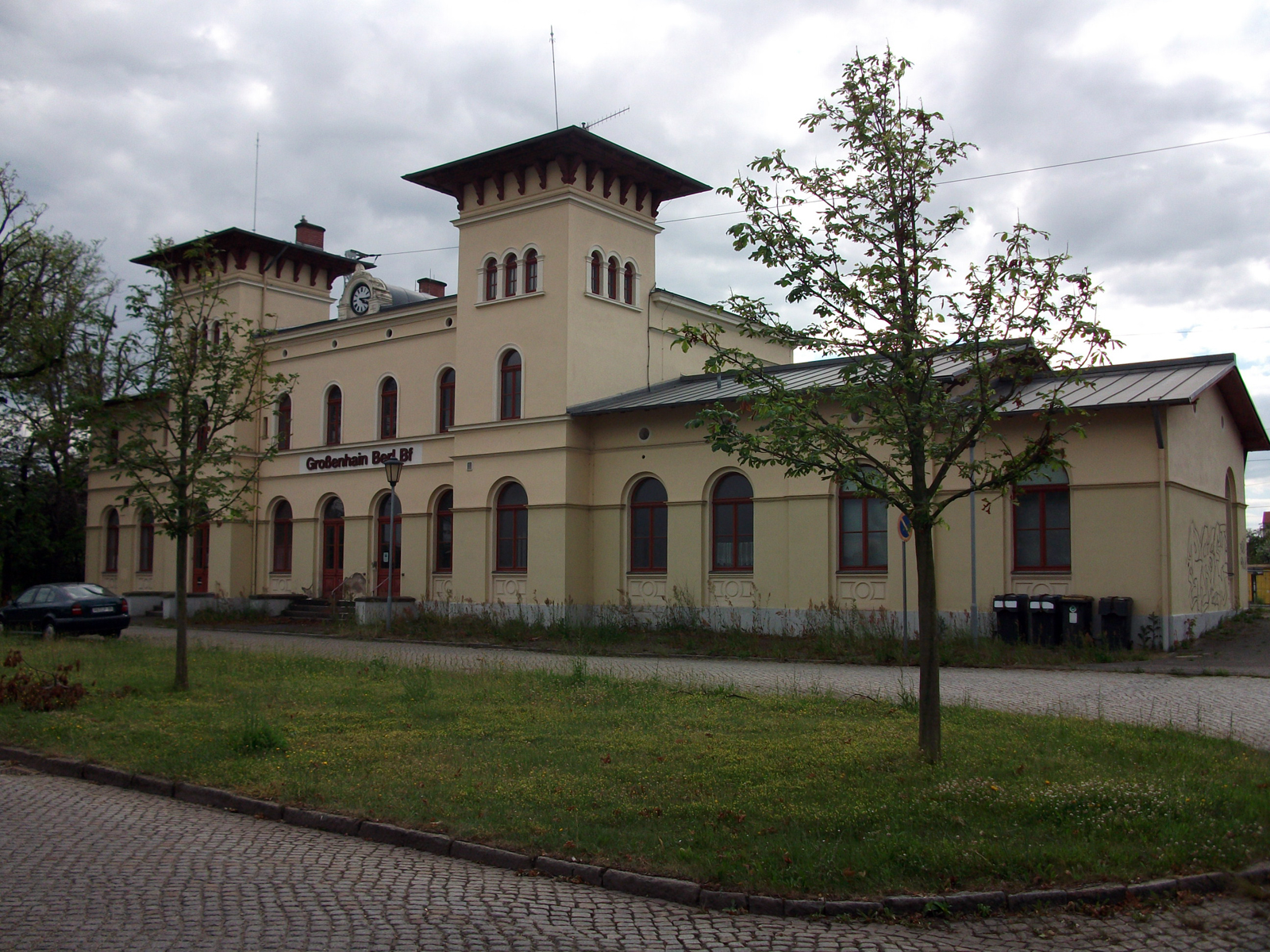
- 2010

General information
- Location: Rosa-Luxemburg-Straße 1; 01558 Großenhain; Saxony; Germany
- Coordinates: 51°17′45″N 13°31′13″E
- Elevation: 117.98 m (387.1 ft)
- System: Bf
- Owner: Deutsche Bahn
- Operator: DB Netz; DB Station&Service
- Lines: Berlin–Dresden railway (KBS 225); Großenhain–Priestewitz railway (KBS 208)
- Platforms: 2 side platforms
- Tracks: 2

Other information
- Station code: -
- DS100 code: DGB
- IBNR: 8013490
- Category: -
- Fare zone: VVO

History
- Opened: 17 June 1875; 151 years ago
- Closed: 14 December 2002; 23 years ago
Location
- Location within Saxony Location within Germany Location within Europe

Großenhain Berliner Bahnhof is a railway station in the municipality of Großenhain, Saxony, Germany. It lies on the Dresden-Friedrichstadt-Elsterwerda railway line and the connecting line to Großenhain Cottb Bf, which branches off here. Since 2002 the scheduled rail traffic at the railway station has been discontinued in favour of Großenhain Cottbuser Bahnhof, which is located closer to the city.

== History ==
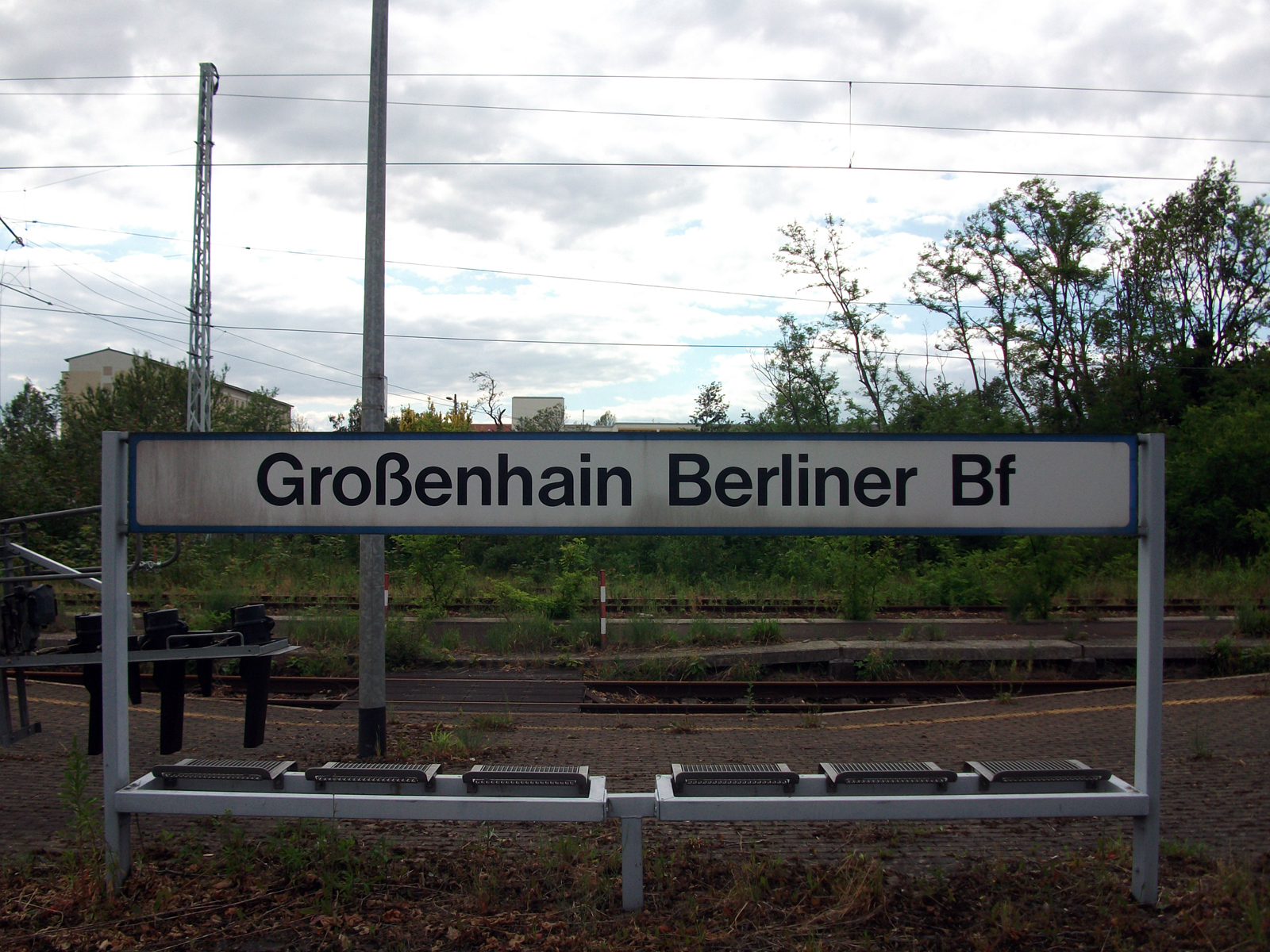
Train station sign (2007)

The railway station was opened on 17 June 1875 in the course of the start of operations on the main Berlin–Dresden railway line.

Until 1996, it had two continuous main tracks, two main tracks and four secondary tracks, including one ramp each, a loading street and a single engine shed on the other side of the station. The secondary tracks fell victim to the following dismantling. The old engine shed was demolished on the occasion of the Landesgartenschau, held in Großenhain in 2002.

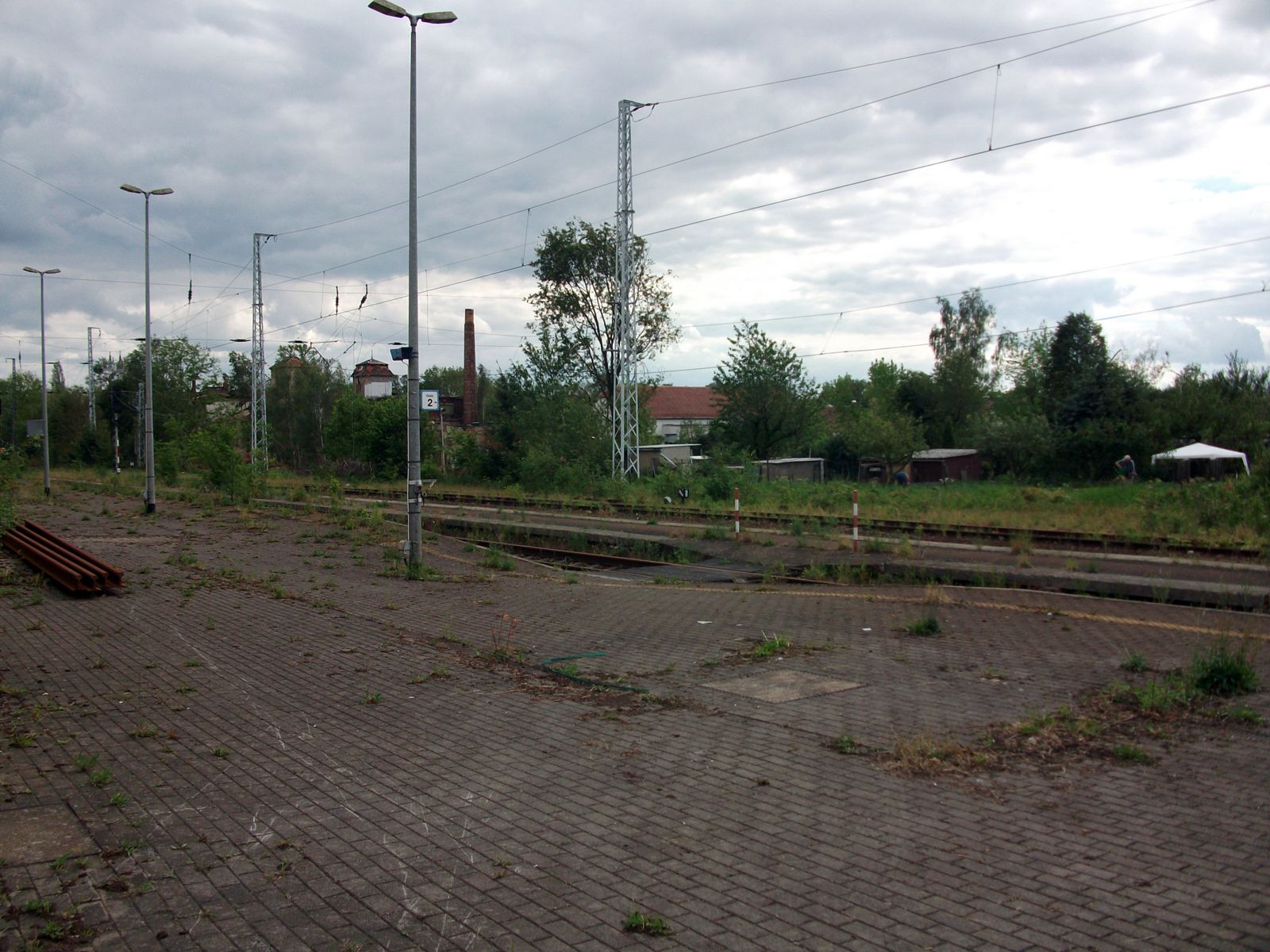
Now-disused platform (2010)

Since the timetable change on 14 December 2002, no passenger trains stopping at Großenhain Berliner Bahnhof anymore after the responsible Verkehrsverbund Oberelbe (VVO) cancelled the local transport services on the section between Coswig and Großenhain on the Berlin–Dresden railway line. The local trains on the Dresden-Elsterwerda line (RB 31) have since been running via Priestewitz and Großenhain Cottbuser Bahnhof. In doing so, they used a connecting line between the two Großenhain stations, which had previously only been used for freight traffic. In the course of the removal of a level crossing at the signal box and the construction of a new bridge for a planned bypass, the points for the overtaking tracks were also removed in 2006. Thus, only the two tracks, including the branch to Großenhain Cottbuser Bahnhof, are still in operation.

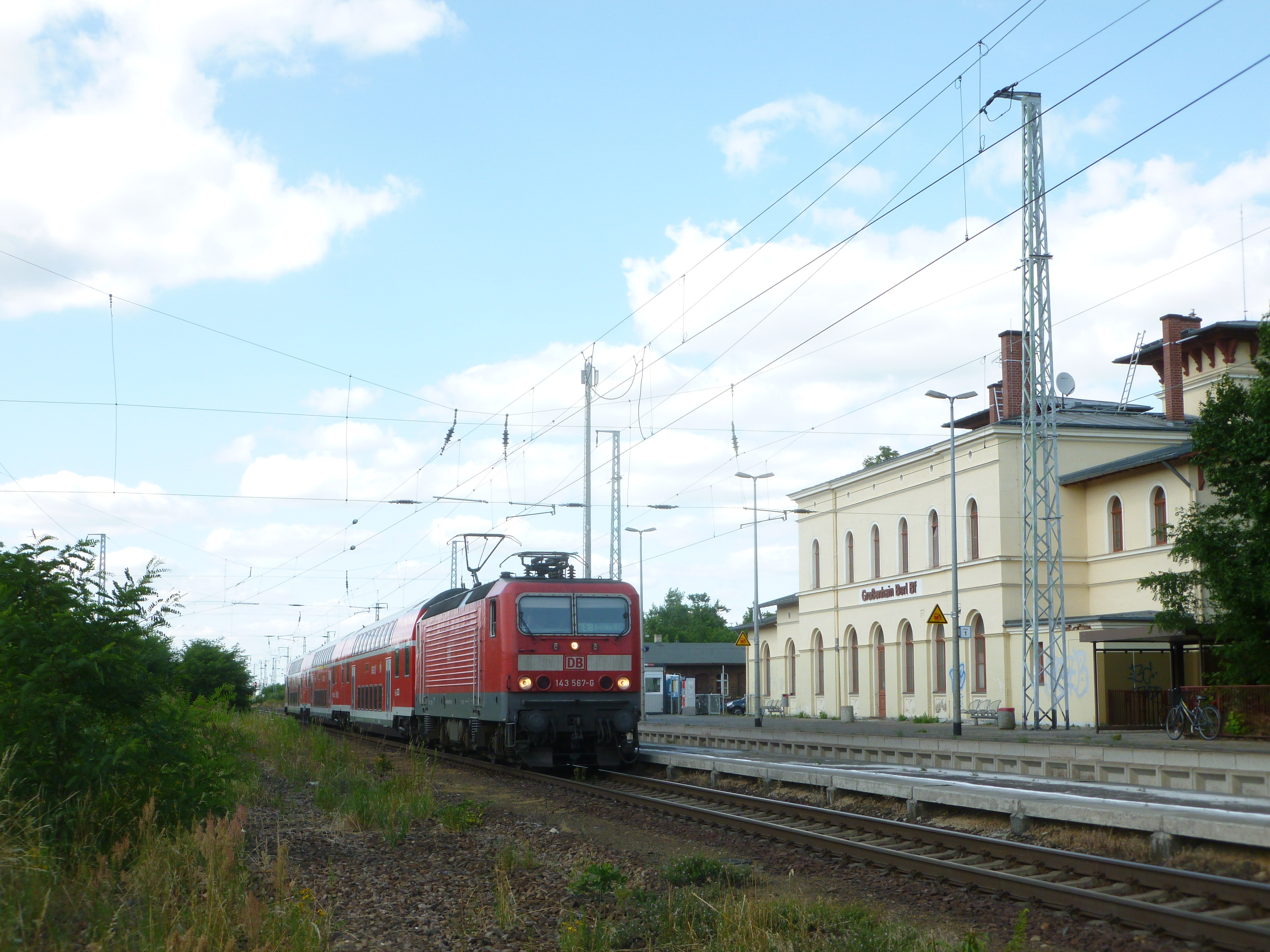
RE 18 train to Dresden (July 2013)

In July/August 2013, the RE 15, RE 18 and RB 31 lines were once again running via Großenhain Berliner Bahnhof due to conversion works at Großenhain Cottbuser Bahnhof. The platforms and crossings were repaired, a ticket machine installed and security personnel employed.
