= Priestewitz station =

Railway station in Priestewitz, Germany

Priestewitz
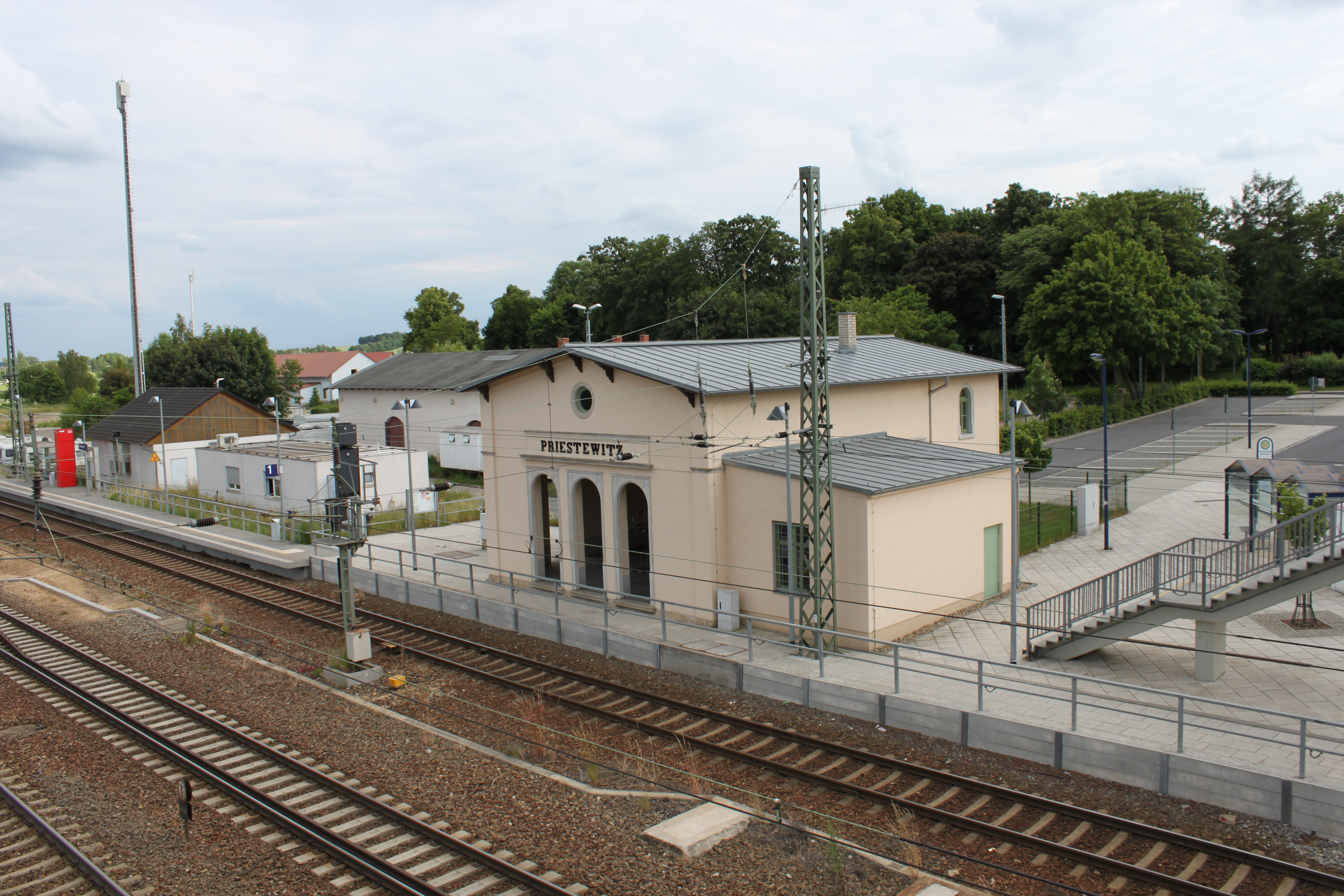
- Entrance building, track side (2010)

General information
- Location: Meißner Straße 2; 01561 Priestewitz; Saxony; Germany
- Coordinates: 51°15′03″N 13°30′31″E
- Owner: DB Netz
- Operator: DB Station&Service
- Lines: Leipzig Hbf–Dresden-Neustadt (km 84.70); Großenhain Cottb Bf–Priestewitz (km 5.26)
- Platforms: 2 side platforms
- Tracks: 3
- Train operators: DB Regio Nordost; DB Regio Südost

Construction
- Accessible: Yes

Other information
- Station code: 5037
- DS100 code: DPR
- IBNR: 8010285
- Category: 6
- Website: www.bahnhof.de

History
- Opened: 9 April 1839; 187 years ago

Services
Preceding station	DB Regio Nordost	Following station
Weinböhla towards Dresden Hbf	RE 15	Großenhain towards Hoyerswerda
Weinböhla towards Dresden Hbf	RE 18	Großenhain towards Cottbus Hbf
Niederau towards Dresden Hbf	RB 31	Großenhain towards Elsterwerda-Biehla
Preceding station	DB Regio Südost	Following station
Nünchritz towards Leipzig Hbf	RE 50	Niederau towards Dresden Hbf
Location
- Location within Saxony

Priestewitz station is on the Leipzig–Dresden railway and the Großenhain–Priestewitz railway, which branches off it. The station is in the town of Priestewitz in the German state of Saxony.

== History ==
Priestewitz station was opened on 9 April 1839 during the construction of the first German long-distance railway, the Leipzig–Dresden railway. It was established because it was near to the major towns of Meissen and Großenhain, which both received direct rail connections about two decades later.

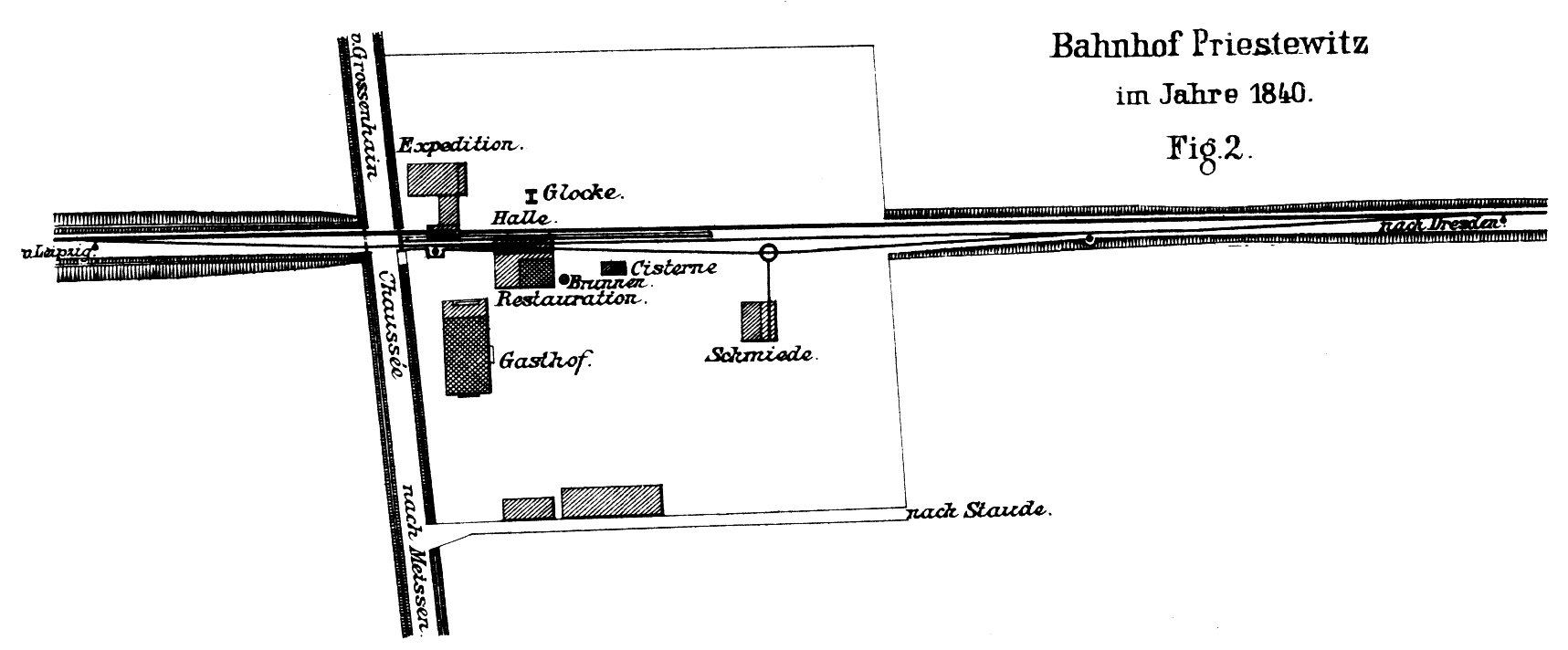
Track plan and buildings in 1840

After the opening of the line, a shed used during its construction was used as a freight receiving facility and waggon depot. The town of Großenhain built a guesthouse at its own expense, which was used for the handling of passengers. The station building itself consisted of a small wooden platform hall for passengers, a barn-like freight shed, an open hall for the reloading the freight onto waggons and a blacksmith for the repair of waggons. There was a "cistern" for the supply of water to locomotives.

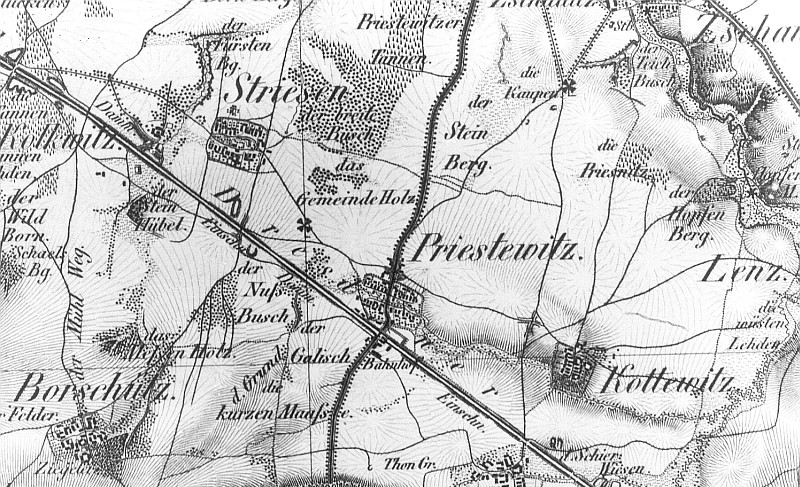
Priestewitz station on a section of Oberreit's map of 1841/1843

Priestewitz benefited from the railway, so the town quickly experienced an economic boom. Even before 1860, a new building was built for handling ticket sales, baggage and freight. It replaced the first station buildings from 1839, which no longer coped with the increasing volume of traffic.

The town of Großenhain was very interested in having its own connection to the rail network. Therefore, some citizens of Großenhain established the Großenhain Branch Railway Company (Zweig-Eisenbahngesellschaft zu Großenhain) to build a connection to the Leipzig–Dresden railway. The Großenhain–Priestewitz railway was opened on 14 October 1862. In 1870, the line was continued by the Cottbus-Großenhain Railway Company to Cottbus as the Großenhain–Cottbus railway. Thus Priestewitz had become a railway junction.

The Verkehrsverbund Oberelbe (Upper Elbe Transport Association, VVO) invested approximately €1.3 million in a new interchange in front of the station in 2005. The interchange was opened on 30 November 2005.

Renovation of the platform facilities commenced in August 2006 and was completed in November of the same year. The total cost of the renovation of the railway facilities was approximately €1.54 million.

As part of the renovation the old guesthouse and the three signal boxes were demolished.

== Description ==
The station consists of a waiting room and a pedestrian bridge between the platforms. It is located on the Leipzig–Dresden railway. A few hundred metres to the northwest the Großenhain–Priestewitz branches off; this continues to Cottbus. The station has three tracks, but the central track does not have a platform, as it is only used for the passage of freight trains and Intercity and Intercity-Express passenger trains. Platforms 1 and 2 are connected via a pedestrian bridge and both have a platform height of 55 cm above rail level. The station has a central dynamic passenger information display.

At the station there is a public transport interchange for long-distance bus services. There are three bus locations (one north and two south of the railway) and 100 parking spaces for park and ride passengers (40 north and 60 south of the railway), as well as parking spaces for short-term parking, motorcycles and taxis. In the waiting room there is 78 spaces for parking bicycles. The station is suitable for disabled passengers and is accessible by wheelchair.

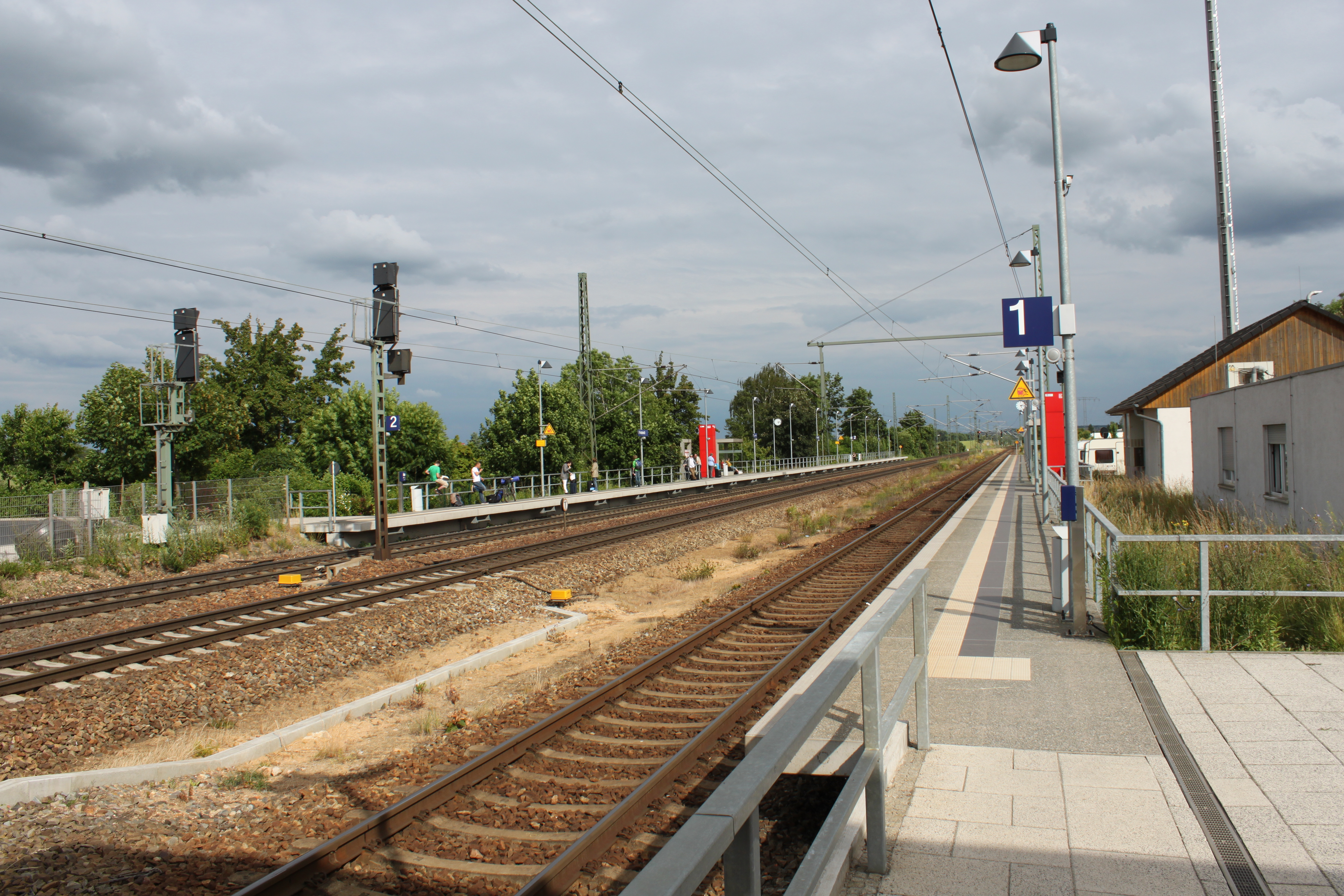
Platforms

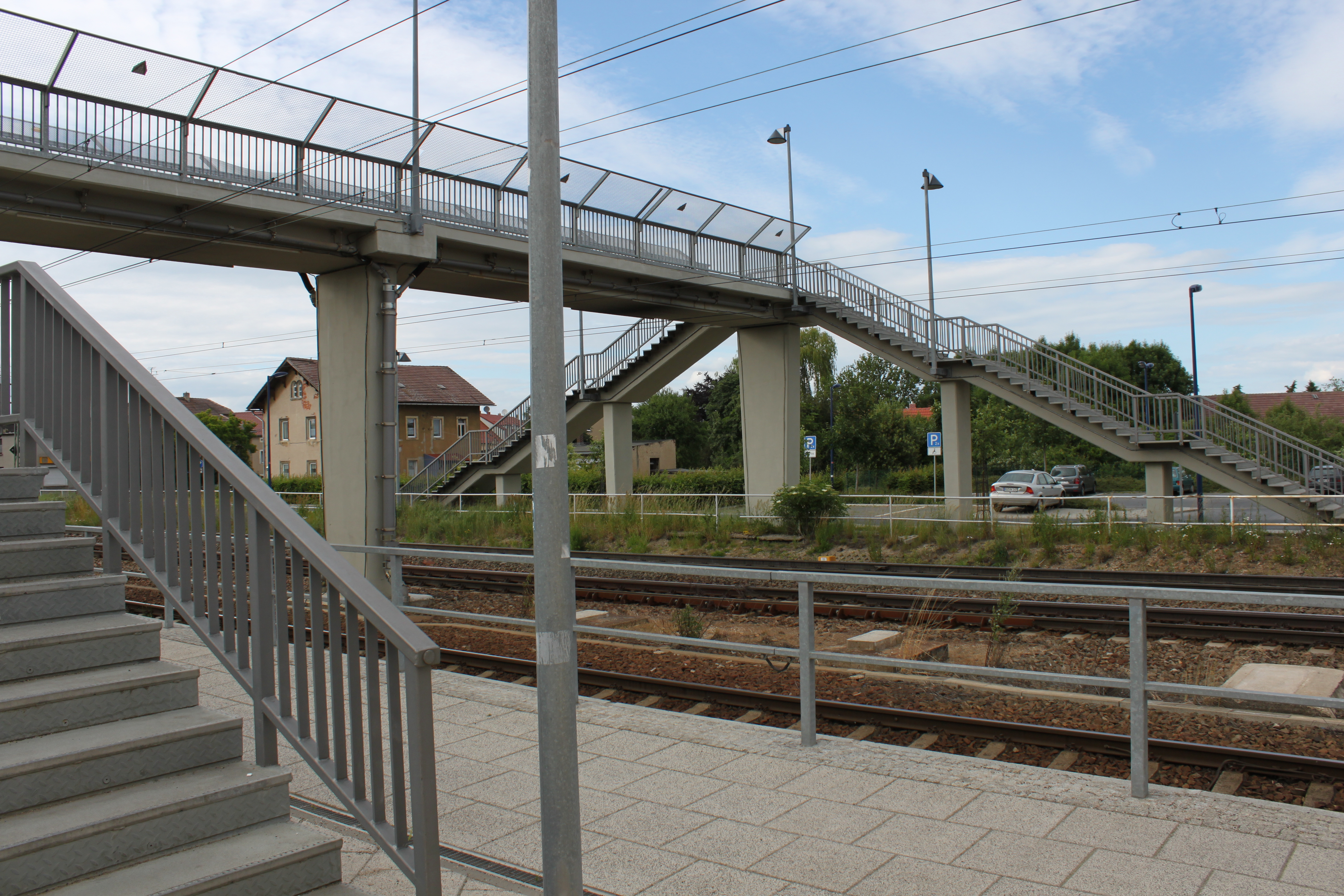
Foot bridge

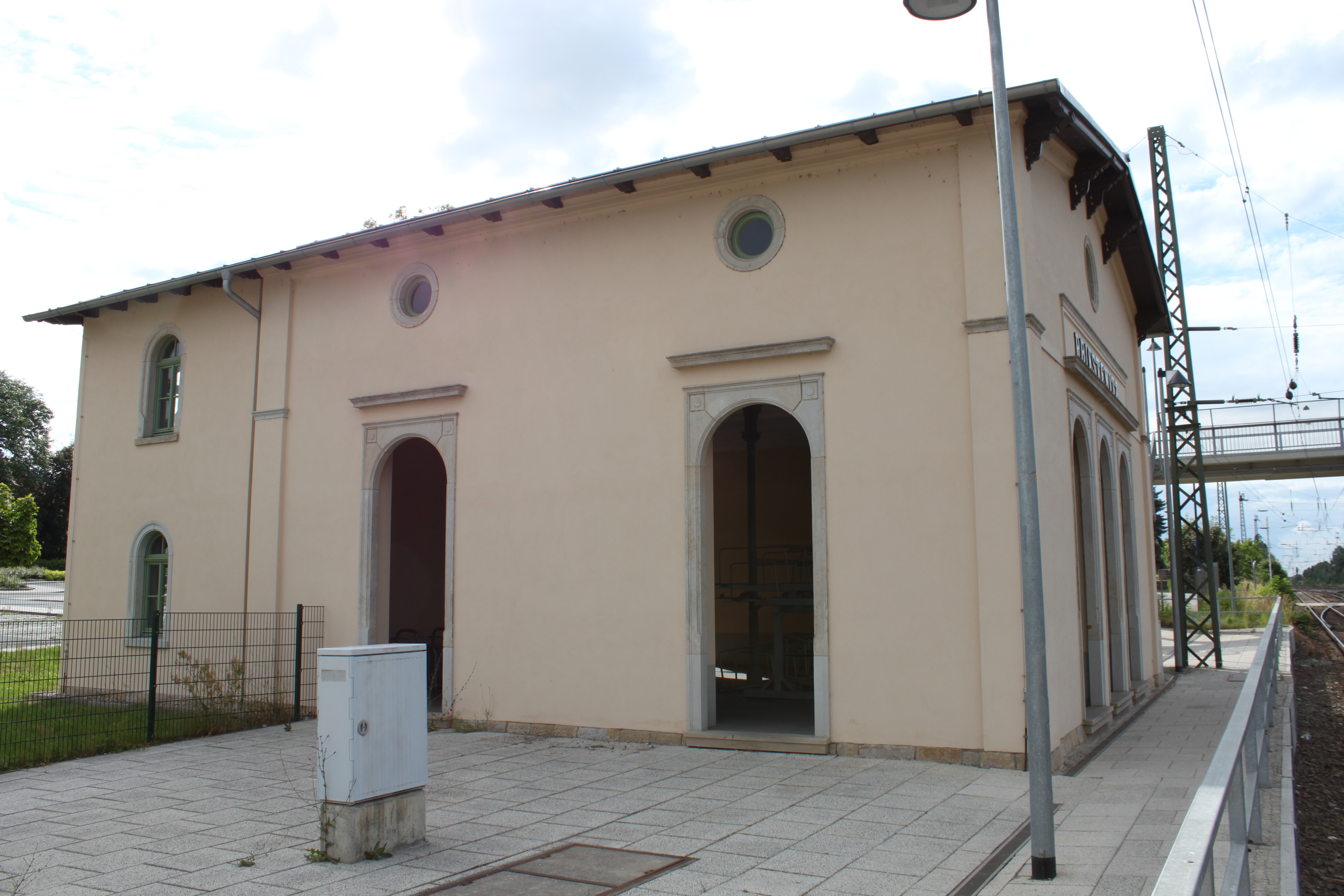
Waiting room

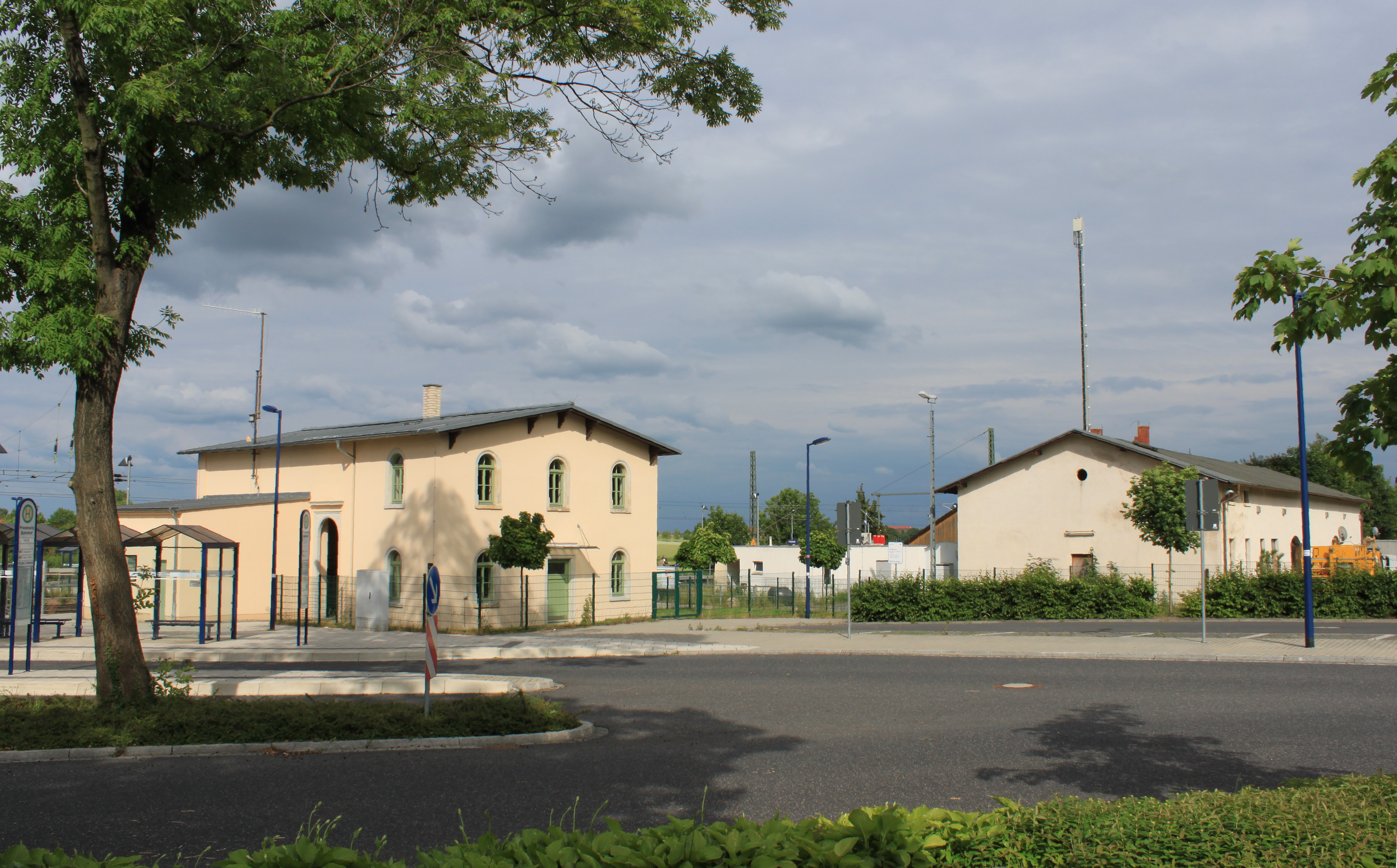
Forecourt with bus platforms

== Rail services ==
The station is located on federal highway 101. A parking lot in front of the railway station caters for commuter traffic. In addition, the station is served by a bus stop on the Meißen–Priestewitz-Großenhain route. It is operated by the Verkehrsgesellschaft Meißen, the municipal transport company of the Meissen district. In the peak hour there are three commuter train services towards Dresden per hour.

Line	Route	Frequency
RE 15	Dresden – Großenhain – Ruhland – Hoyerswerda	120 min
RE 18	Dresden – Großenhain – Ruhland – Cottbus	120 min
RE 50	Dresden – Riesa – Leipzig	60 min
RB 31	Dresden – Großenhain – Elsterwerda-Biehla	120 min (more often during the peak hour)

Priestewitz station operates bus route 409 (Meissen – Priestewitz – Großenhain), 410 (Großenhain – Priestewitz – Blattersleben – Gävernitz) and 463 (Großenhain – Priestewitz – Böhla – Großenhain).

== See also ==
- List of railway stations in Saxony
