= Leipzig–Dresden railway =

Railway line in Saxony, Germany

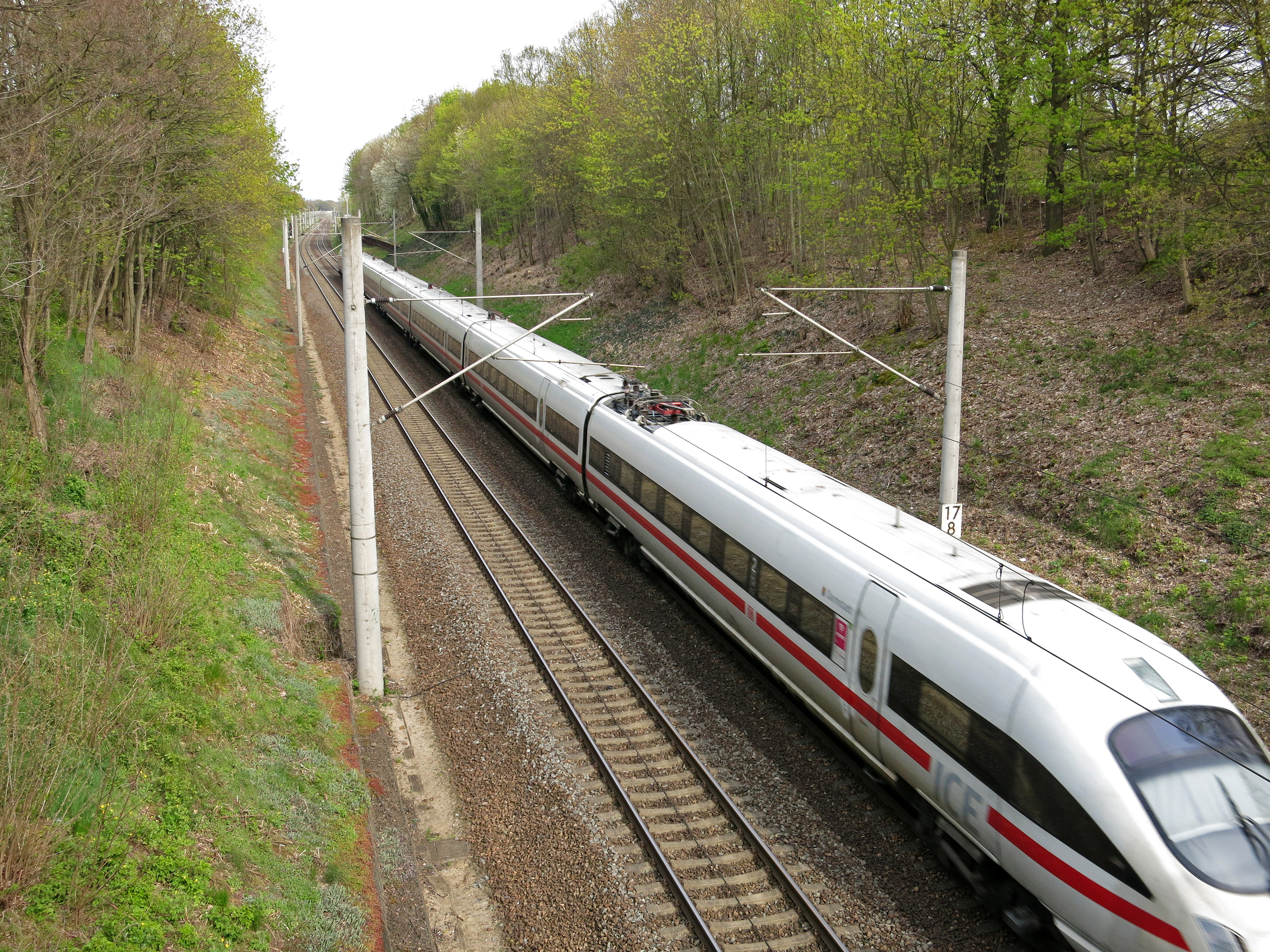
- Leipzig–Dresden railway

Overview
- Line number: 6363
- Locale: Saxony, Germany
- Termini: Leipzig Hbf; Dresden-Neustadt

Service
- Route number: 500

Technical
- Line length: 116.098 km (72.140 mi)
- Number of tracks: 2
- Track gauge: 1,435 mm (4 ft 8 1/2 in) standard gauge
- Minimum radius: 270 m (886 ft)
- Electrification: 15 kV/16.7 Hz AC overhead catenary
- Operating speed: 200 km/h (125 mph)
- Maximum incline: 0.7%

The Leipzig–Dresden line is a German railway line. It was built by the Leipzig–Dresden Railway Company between 1837 and 1839. It was the first long-distance railway and the first railway using only steam traction in Germany. It also included the first standard gauge railway tunnel in continental Europe. The Dresden Leipzig railway station was the first railway station in Dresden, the capital of Saxony. It was the terminus of the Leipzig-Dresden railway.

Work to upgrade the line as German Unity Transport Project (Verkehrsprojekt Deutsche Einheit) no. 9 has been underway since 1993. According to the federal government €1.115 billion of an estimated total cost of €1.451 billion had been invested in the project by the end of 2013 (net present value for planning, land acquisition and construction costs). Funds of €336 million were still available.

== History ==
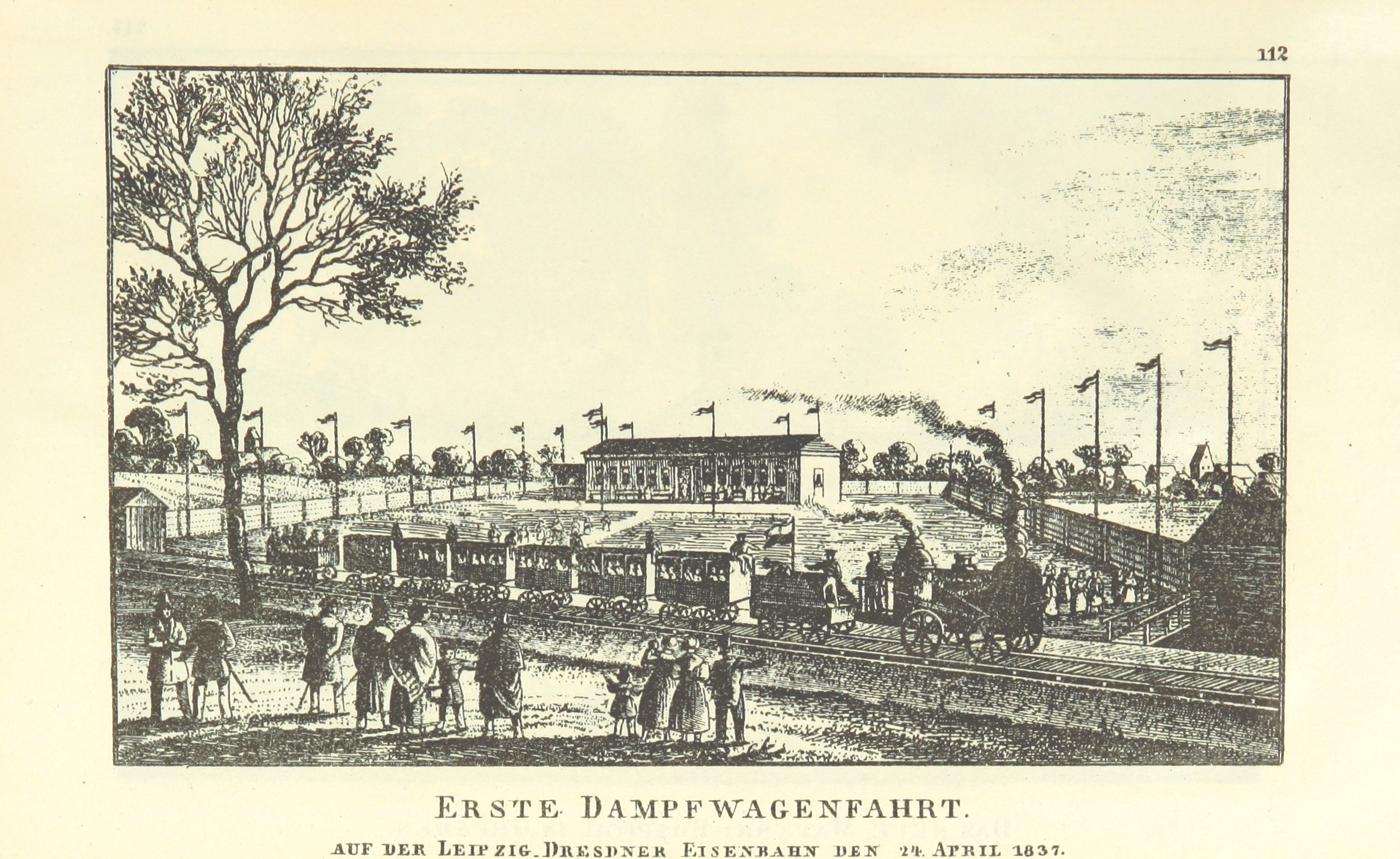
The first trip of steam-hauled waggons on the Leipzig–Dresden Railway on 24 April 1837

The line was built by the Leipzig-Dresden Railway Company (German: Leipzig-Dresdner Eisenbahn-Compagnie, LDE) established by twelve businessmen in 1835.

The idea that a railway should connect Leipzig with Strehla (on the Elbe), was first suggested in 1830 by the Leipzig merchant Carl Gottlieb Tenner. After the economist Friedrich List (1789–1846) published plans in Leipzig in 1833 for a German railway system with Leipzig as a central node, Tenner's idea gained new force. In the same year, a railway committee was established and it addressed a petition requesting the building of a railway line from Leipzig to Dresden to the first Saxon parliament (Sächsischer Landtag) in Dresden on 20 November 1833.

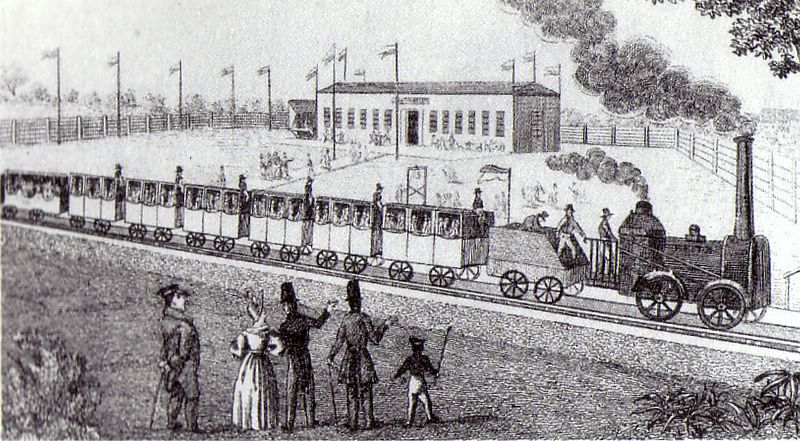
Temporary station restaurant at Althen with departing steam engine, around 1837

After the railway had been approved by government decree on 6 May 1835, the Leipzig-Dresden Railway Company was founded by twelve citizens of Leipzig as a private corporation on 22 May. The shares of the company were fully subscribed at a price of 100 thalers within one and a half days, making capital of 1.5 million thalers available to the company.

In October 1835, the English engineers Sir James Walker and Hawkshaw examined the proposed routes and stated their preference for a northern route via Strehla (estimated cost: 1,808,500 thalers) rather than a route via Meissen (1,956,000 thalers).

=== Construction ===
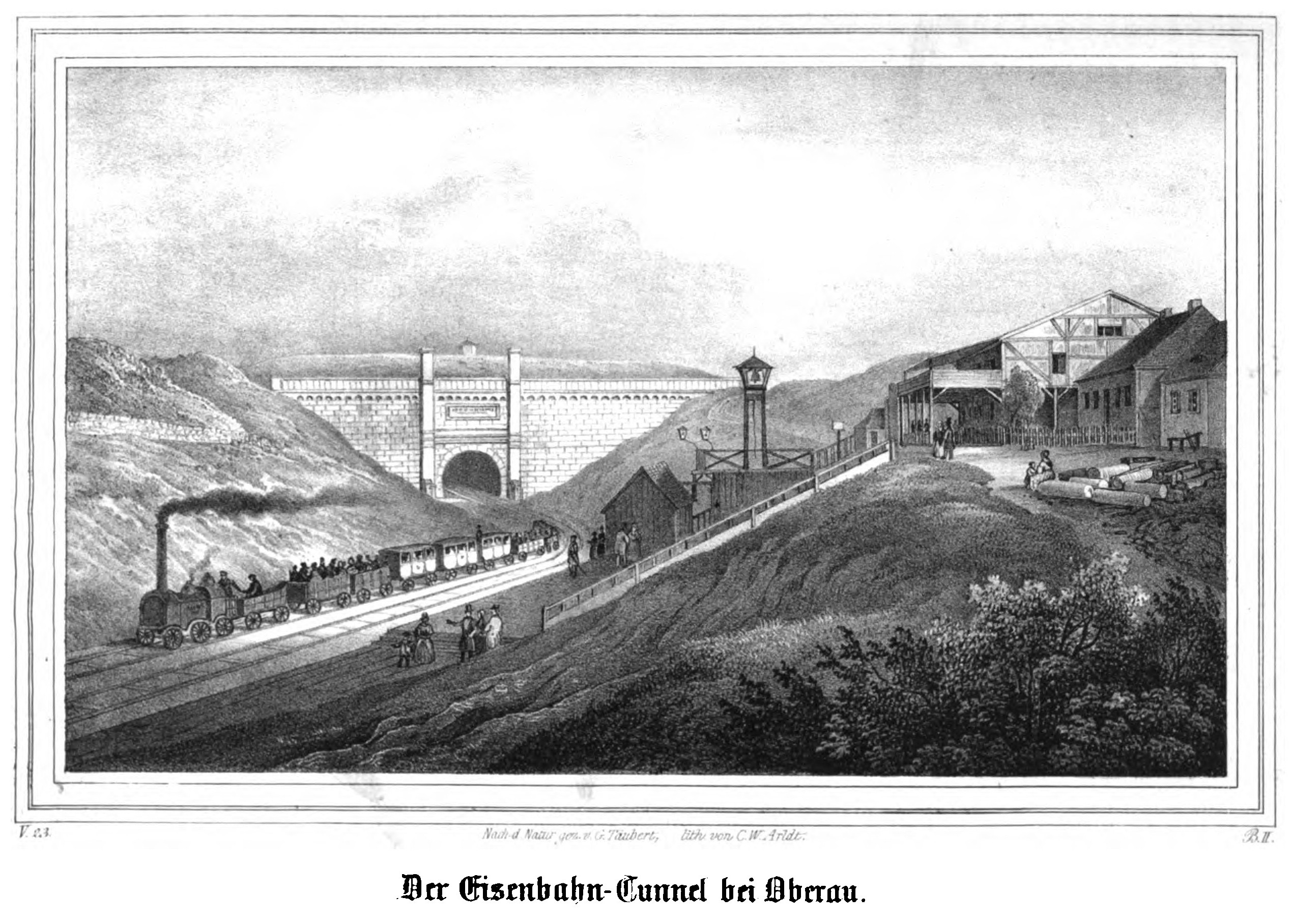
Oberau Tunnel about 1840

On 16 November 1835, land acquisition began for the section between Leipzig and the bridge over the Mulde west of Wurzen. Ground was broken near Machern on 1 March 1836. The management of the construction for the whole project was in the hands of the Saxon Senior Waterways Construction Engineer (Oberwasserbaudirektor), Karl Theodor Kunz (1791–1863). But then the town of Strehla refused permission for the railway to be built through it. So the line was built seven kilometers to the south, crossing the Elbe in Riesa. The company's initial capital in 1837 was 4.5 million thalers, which was later increased to 6.5 million thalers. The first train crosses the Elbe bridge on 7 April 1839.

The line was brought into operation in several stages:

- 1837, 24 April: Leipzig–Althen (10.60 km)
- 1837, 12 November: Althen–Borsdorf–Gerichshain (4.32 km)
- 1838, 11 May: Gerichshain–Machern (2.93 km)
- 1838, 19 July: Weintraube–Dresden (8.18 km)
- 1838, 31 July: Machern–Wurzen (8.00 km)
- 1838, 16 September: Wurzen–Dahlen (17.53 km)
- 1838, 16 September: Oberau–Coswig–Weintraube (13.44 km)
- 1838, 3 November: Dahlen–Oschatz (9.56 km)
- 1838, 21 November: Oschatz–Riesa (13.07 km)
- 1839, 7 April: Riesa–Oberau (28.45 km)

On 7 April 1839, on the completion of the Elbe bridge at Riesa, the entire route from Leipzig to Dresden was finally opened. The travel time between Leipzig and Dresden was three hours and 40 minutes. On this occasion, a coin was issued with an engraving of an English B locomotive, which ran over the line in the early years.

It included the 513-metre-long Oberau Tunnel, the first standard gauge rail tunnel in continental Europe. The line was preceded only by the Prince William Railway, a narrow-gauge plateway opened in 1831 and the Bavarian Ludwig Railway opened in 1835, which was a short line and was initially operated largely by horse-drawn trains, partly because it was located a long way from coal fields and no railways existed to convey coal to Nuremberg. In contrast the Leipzig–Dresden Railway used only steam traction from its beginning.

Work began immediately on building a second track. The whole line was open for two-track operations by 1 October 1840. This was made possible because the subgrade along with all engineering structures had been designed from the outset for two tracks. Trains—following English practice—ran on the left until 1884.

=== Operations by the Royal Saxon State Railways ===
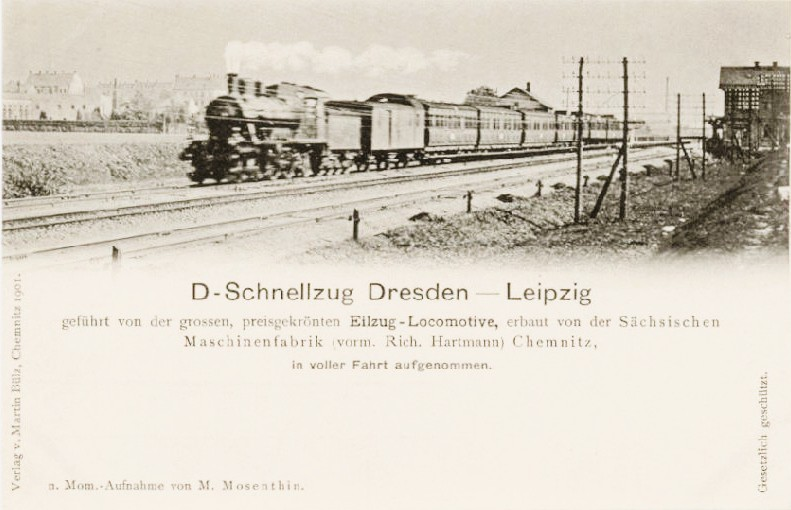
Express train on the Leipzig–Dresden railway about 1900

On 29 March 1876, the general meeting of shareholders decided to sell the Leipzig–Dresden Railway to the Saxon government. Operations and management of the Leipzig-Dresden Railway were transferred to the Royal Saxon State Railways (Königlich Sächsische Staatseisenbahnen) on 1 July 1876.

The development of the Leipzig–Dresden Railway from its beginnings as a private initiative of Leipzig citizens until its nationalisation in 1878 is reflected in Leipzig's railway heritage.

The Saxon part of the new Leipzig Hauptbahnhof (main station), which became the terminus for trains from Dresden, was put into operation on 4 December 1915.

=== After the First World War ===
1 April 1920, the Royal Saxon State Railways (recently renamed the Saxon State Railway) were absorbed into the newly established German National Railways (Deutsche Reichsbahn). The Leipzig-Dresden line came under the administration of the Dresden Reichsbahn Directorate.

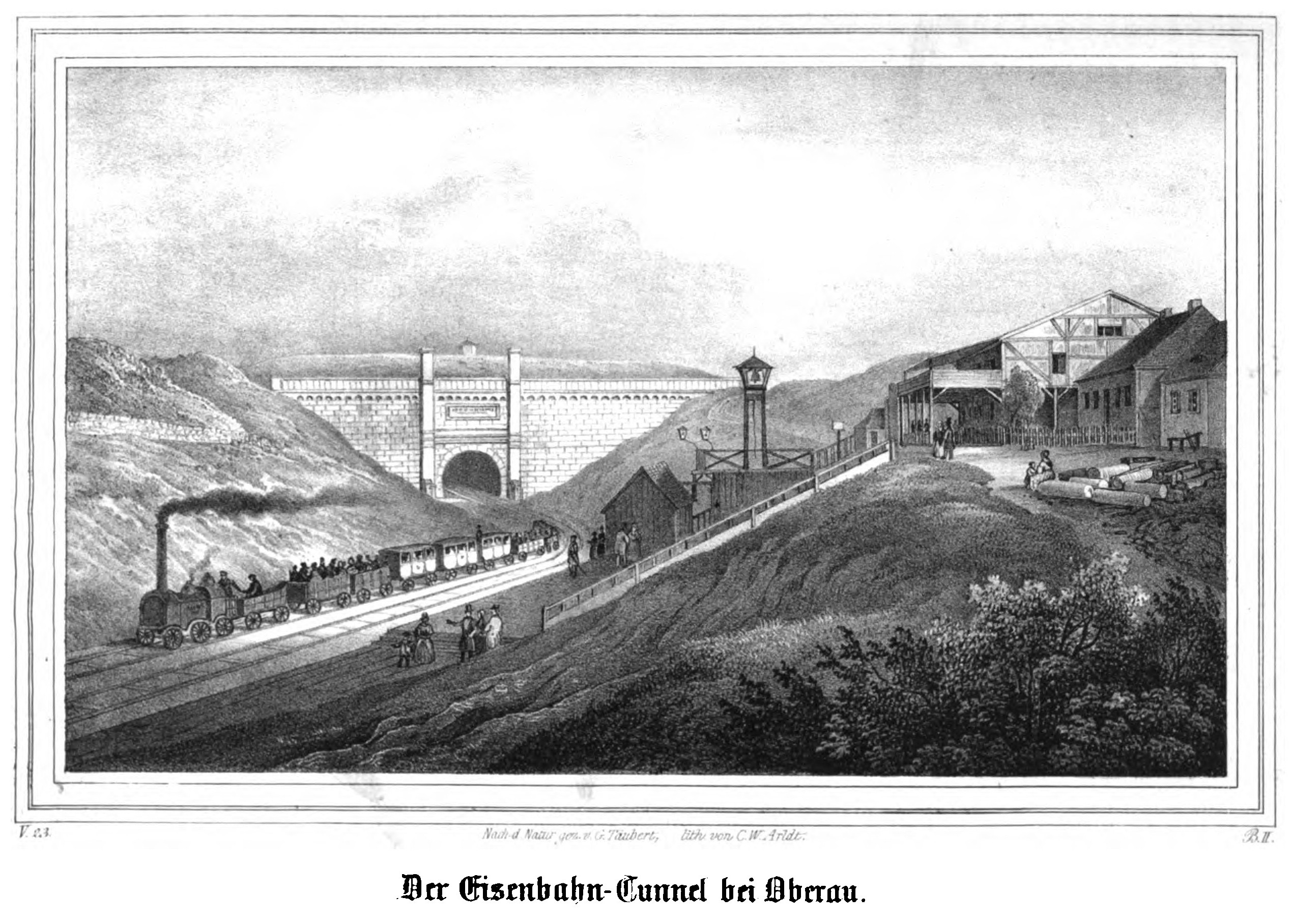
North portal of the Oberau Tunnel

From 1 July 1933 to July 1934 the Oberau Tunnel was opened up and turned into a cutting, because the tunnel was not wide enough as the loading gauge had increased. As a result, the distance between the two tracks did not allow two trains to pass in the tunnel.

=== The line in the communist era ===
In 1946 one of the two tracks was removed to provide the route as reparations to the Soviet Union. Even the previously four-track section between Coswig and Dresden-Neustadt was reduced to only one track. This meant that the capacity of one of the most important main lines in Germany had been reduced to only a fraction of its former level. Temporarily trains ran one way from Leipzig and Dresden on the line, while trains running in the other direction ran via Meissen and Döbeln. This system of operations proved problematic, however, as the hilly route via Döbeln meant that additional locomotives were always needed for heavy trains.

The second track had been rebuilt by 1967.

In the early 1960s, there were plans were for electrification of the line as part of the Saxon triangle. Electric-powered services operated between Dresden and Riesa from the winter 1969–1970 timetable and the remaining section was operated by electric trains from 1 September 1970. The electrification included the first use of spun concrete poles by Deutsche Reichsbahn. The power was supplied over 110 kV transmission lines from the power station in Karl-Marx-Stadt, which had two 25 MW steam turbines, and from the Muldenstein railway power station, which had three 11.3-MW steam turbines. However, the existing capacity was not enough for the rapidly growing rail traffic so steam and diesel locomotives were also used. Full electric operations were only possible with the commissioning of the Dresden power station with its three 32-MW turbines.

The table below shows the dates of the completion of the electrification:

Opening	Section	Comment
25 September 1969	Leipzig Hbf–Wurzen	
28 September 1969	Riesa–Dresden-Neustadt	
31 May 1970	Wurzen–Riesa	
10 May 1974	Althen–Borsdorf junction	Freight tracks

=== Upgrade to a high-speed line ===
After the German reunification in 1990, the line was one of the busiest railway in Germany and, like many other lines of Deutsche Reichsbahn, required urgent rehabilitation and modernisation. The project was approved as German Unity Transport Project No. 9 (VDE 9) by the Federal Cabinet on 9 April 1991.

The scheduled journey time between Leipzig Hauptbahnhof and Dresden Hauptbahnhof has been reduced to 47 minutes in 2014. In 1990, the travel time between Leipzig and Dresden had been 90 minutes.

==== Planning ====
The Reichsbahn divisions of Dresden and Halle developed a feasibility study until 14 November 1991. Initially it was planned that the existing route would be supplemented by about 105 km of new line. The new line would run between Dresden Hauptbahnhof and the Oschatz area to the south and west of the Elbe. The finalisation of the route depended on the result of continuing investigations. With a top speed of 250 km/h, the travel time of ICE trains would have amounted to around 35 minutes.

A supplementary examination of different options for a new railway (Neubaustrecke) and a reconstructed railway (Ausbaustrecke) were presented on 13 January 1992. The preliminary design for both options and the development of a synopsis for making a decision began on 23 January 1992. For economic reasons, the option of building a new line was rejected on 19 March 1992 as a combined new and upgraded line would have been about one billion marks cheaper than a purely new line.

The upgraded line would allow operations at 200 km/h, according to the status of the planning set out on the foundation stone (1992), it would have been completed in 1999 at a cost of 2.675 billion marks. 67 km of the line would have been upgraded and 48 km would have been new line. Riesa would in this case have been bypassed to the south by a new line that would have separated from the original line between Oschatz and Bömitz. The Jahna valley would have been spanned by an 800 m-long bridge and a new bridge would have been built over the Elbe near Merschwitz in the municipality of Nünchritz. The whole 115 km-long project involved the construction or renovation of 57 railway and 23 road bridges. Other important planned engineering structures also included the two-kilometre long Kockelsberg Tunnel. In a later stage a seven-kilometre long new section of line was planned as a southern bypass of Wurzen. The travel time between the stations of Leipzig and Dresden would fall to 45 minutes for long-distance services. The completion was initially scheduled for 31 December 1998.

In the Federal Transport Infrastructure Plan of 1992, the proposed upgraded Leipzig–Dresden line ran approximately parallel to a section of the Berlin–Dresden railway for 13 km, but these plans were later modified. Between Böhla and Radebeul, only the Berlin–Dresden railway would now be upgraded for high-speed traffic and a link would be built to the Leipzig–Dresden railway. This would have saved about 370 million marks, significantly reduced affects in nature and landscape and allowed the separation of fast and slow traffic.

The preliminary design for the entire project was completed on 31 August 1992 and handed over to Deutsche Reichsbahn to check. It was confirmed in March 1993. The new route would follow the existing tracks between Leipzig and Wurzen as well as between Kornhain and Bornitz. The line would bypass Riesa to the south, cross the original line at Medessen and finally connect with the Berlin-Dresden railway near Böhla station. With 74 km of upgraded line and 41 km of new construction, the line would be able to operate over its entire length at 200 km/h.

An application for planning approval for the new section was prepared in 1993. The preliminary design for the entire project was completed in 1995 with the completion of documentation for the regional planning process for the Bornitz–Weinböhla section. A scheduled rebuilding of the line between Engelsdorf and Leipzig as a four-track electrified line was rejected by the Federal Ministry of Transport on 27 August 1993. The preparatory work for the construction of this section, which had started in May 1993, was abandoned.

In January and February 1994, the planned southern bypass of Wurzen was also deleted along with the connecting curve at Zeithain. The line through Wurzen would instead be upgraded to allow operations at 160 km/h. The travel time between Leipzig and Dresden in 1994 was 85 minutes.

The project suffered from perennial delays for various reasons. The substantially modified planning principles for the Leipzig–Wurzen section resulted in a break between the preliminary design and the pre-construction of the section. The intention in the summer of 1993 to initiate the planning process for the southern bypass of Riesa and the connection to the Berlin–Dresden railway was not carried out. The southern bypass Riesa was finally abandoned in March 1995 and instead it was decided to upgrade the line through the town with a speed reduced to 100 km/h; the preliminary design work that was started in mid-1995 was delayed by this change to the plan. For the section between Radebeul and Dresden Hauptbahnhof the preplanning did not start in spring 1992, like the main part of the line, but only in May 1994, because the planning principles on the part of the customer remained unclear for a long time. The planning in this section was only submitted by Deutsche Bahn in November 1994 and only approved in December 1995. In addition, the budgeted rate of up to 500 million DM per year was reduced in early 1994 by Deutsche Bahn so that in the annual financial statements for 2008 it had fallen to an average of 120 million DM. After the reduction of funds in 1993 and 1994 due to the federal funding of about 100 million DM per year having been cut in half, the project was no longer expected to be completed before the turn of the century.

The Weißig–Böhla link to the Berlin–Dresden railway and the diversion of long-distance services to the Berlin–Dresden line between Böhla and Neucoswig represented the only remaining planned changes to the route of the line. To date (as of 2013), no completion date has been set for the entire project

In addition, a 7 km-long 110 kV traction current cable between Lüptitz and Wurzen and the Wurzen substation was to be rebuilt and the train control of the whole line was to be implemented through electronic interlockings.

The upgrade of the lines was planned in three phases:

1. upgrade of the Leipzig–Riesa section for a top speed of 200 km/h. This stage was started in 1993 and completed in 2002.
2. upgrade between Dresden Hauptbahnhof and Dresden-Neustadt. The railway line has been increased to three tracks and supplements the two S-Bahn tracks of the Pirna–Coswig railway in this section. The project, which was divided into four sections, received planning approval on 23 March 2000. The agreement on its finances was signed on 6 July 2001.
3. Riesa–Dresden–Neustadt. This section was divided into twelve subsections for planning approval.

The journey time between Leipzig and Dresden-Neustadt was projected to decline for long-distance services from 91 minutes before the start of construction to 47 minutes. The minimum journey time in the 2015 timetable between Leipzig Hauptbahnhof and Dresden-Neustadt for long-distance services is approximately 60 minutes.

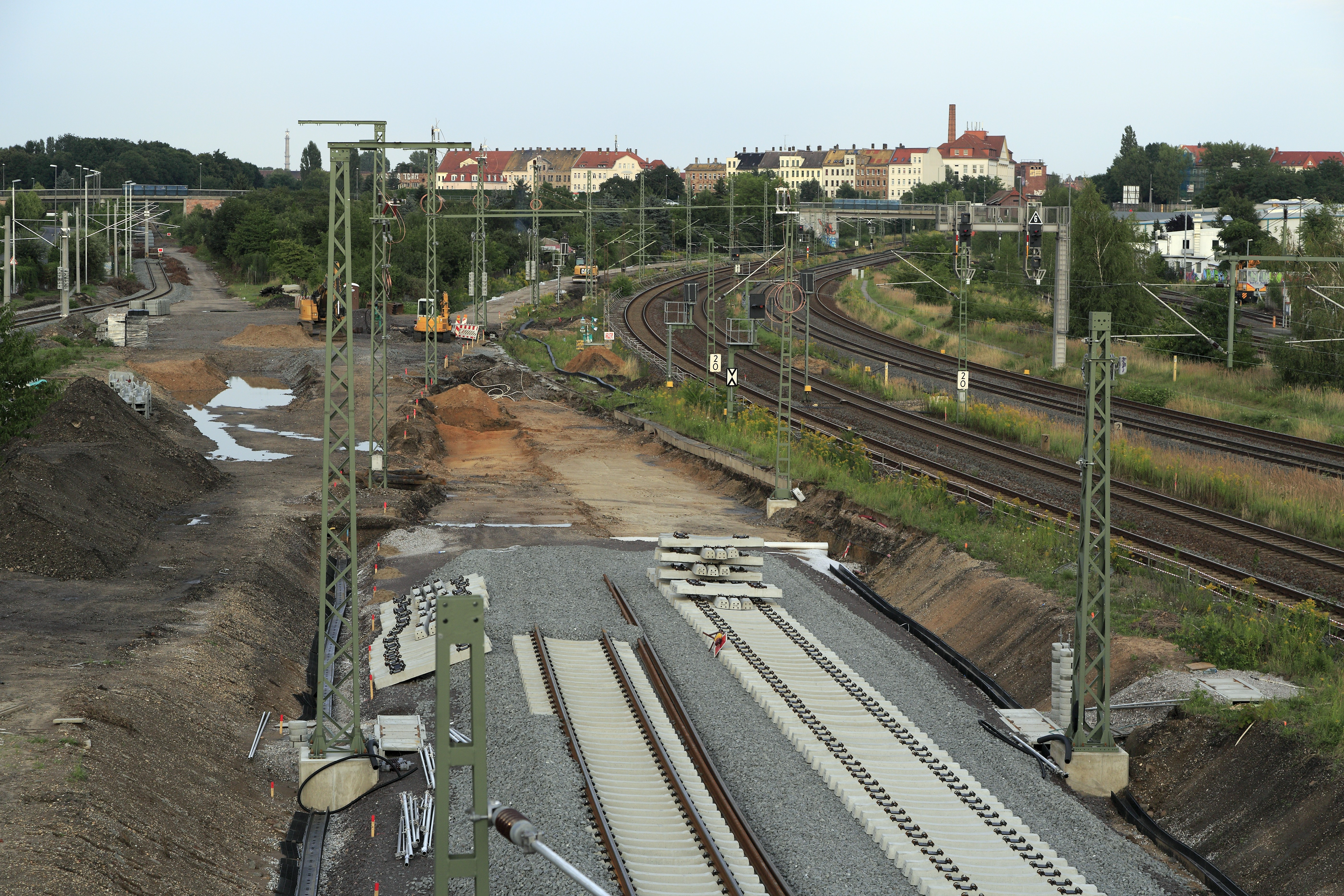
Leipzig-Dresden freight yard looking east prior to the pivoting the mainline tracks, 3 August 2014

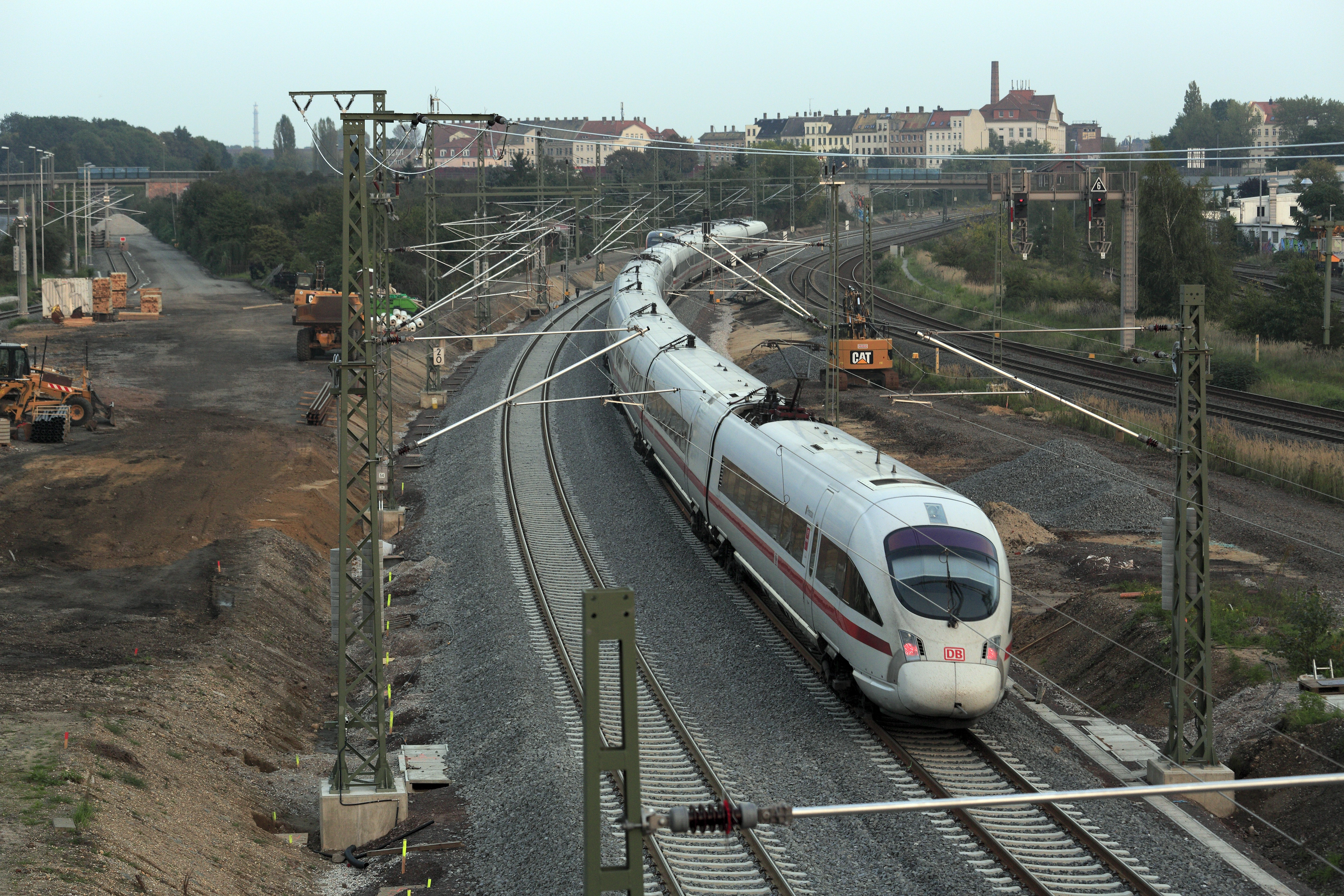
After the pivoting on 1 October 2014, to the left is the former line to Connewitz

==== Construction ====
Construction of the upgrade of the existing line between Weißig and Priestewitz began in May 1993, which was followed a little later by the upgrade of the section between Leipzig-Ost and Engelsdorf and bridge work between Wurzen and Oschatz. The ground for the upgrade of the line was broken in Dahlen by State Secretary Wilhelm Knittel, Deutsche Bahn board member Peter Münchschwander and foreman Steffen Müller on 9 September 1993. In 1996, the first electronic interlocking in Saxony was taken into operation in Oschatz.

The line has been largely upgraded for speeds of 160 km/h in the city of Leipzig and for 200 km/h east of Leipzig-Paunsdorf. In the section between Leipzig and Wurzen the existing route has been largely preserved; deviations of the line were necessary in four places to permit speeds to be raised. The section of rebuilt line through Wurzen station (km 21.6 to 27.66) was upgraded for speeds of only 160 km/h.

In the autumn of 1997, the Posthausen–Altenbach and Wurzen–Bornitz sections were upgraded for operations at 200 km/h, services commenced on the Borsdorf–Altenbach section at 160 km/h and on the Wurzen-Riesa section at 200 km/h in May 1998. The upgrade of the Altenbach–Wurzen section (km 21.64 to 25.23) started in the autumn of 1999, including a realignment around the Mulde, which was around 1,000 m long.

The first stage of construction between Leipzig and Riesa went into operation in 2002. The section has since been largely (kilometres 5–23 and 29–51) operable at 200 km/h and equipped with the Linienzugbeeinflussung train protection system (kilometres 3.6–59.5). Between Borsdorf and Bornitz the sub-block mode was used for the first time for trains entering from on a track connecting from an old line. The section of line controlled by the electronic signalling centre at Wurzen now makes reversible operations possible continuously from Leipzig-Engelsdorf to Bornitz and Leipzig Hauptbahnhof to Oschatz.

€530 million had been invested in the upgrading of 51 km of lines by the beginning of 2002. With more than 220 trains per day, the line was considered to be the most important railway line in Saxony. During the 2002 European floods, two bridges to the east of Riesa collapsed and an embankment was severely damaged. The section was completely closed from 16 August 2002. Regular operations were resumed with two single-track temporary bridges on 31 October 2002. The second track at Röderau was put back into operation at the end of August 2003 The total damage to the track to the end of 2002 was estimated at €60 million. With the restoration of services in 2003, a reduction in the running time of 23 minutes was achieved.

The second stage of construction of the upgrade between Dresden-Neustadt and Dresden Hauptbahnhof, which began in 2001, was completed in 2010.

The Riesa–Zeithain section, including the three-track Elbe crossing, and the new selection of line connecting to the Berlin–Dresden railway were completed as part of the third stage of construction. The 13 km long upgrade of the line between Dresden-Neustadt and Coswig began in the autumn of 2009 and is expected to be completed in 2016. As a result of the upgrade, two separate tracks will be established for both the long-distance traffic and the Dresden S-Bahn. The signalling and the S-Bahn stations along the line are being completely renewed and a new Dresden Bischofsplatz station is being built as part of this work. Once the work is completed, the speed limit on this section will increase for long-distance and regional traffic from 120 km/h to 160 km/h. Work has not begun on sections of this line at Riesa station and on the Röderau–Zeithain junction and Zeithain junction–Weißig sections.

Parts of the line between Riesa and Dresden-Neustadt were upgraded for higher speeds than 120 km/h. Between Weißig (km 77.9) and Coswig (km 101.3), the line was upgraded for the use of active tilt. Between Weißig (km 77.9) and Coswig (km 101.3) the line was upgraded for the use of active tilting and ICE T trains ran there until 2008 with speeds of up to 160 km/h. Nevertheless, the train control system installed for tilting operations is no longer in service. The speed limit between Coswig and Riesa is 120 km/h throughout (on the original line, not on the new Weißig–Böhla line). Between Dresden and Coswig there were, until the commencement of the upgrade project (at the end of 2009), four permanent speed restrictions of 70 or 90 km/h. During the work, there was only one track available between the stations of Coswig and Radebeul West and between Radebeul Ost and Dresden-Neustadt. Freight trains and the IC traffic were rerouted via Cossebaude. Speeds of 160 km/h have been permitted on the long-distance tracks since December 2014 between Radebeul Nord junction and Radebeul Ost.

The upgrade to four tracks between Dresden-Neustadt and Radebeul Ost (km 109.7 to 116.0) could not begin until November 2011. In July 2010, it was expected to be completed by the spring of 2016. Deutsche Bahn justified the delays compared to the original plan as being a result of the delays in the finalisation of the financing of all parts of the project until October 2009. The section between Dresden-Neustadt and Coswig is now expected (as of 2014) to be completed in 2016.

The track has been equipped with ETCS Level 2. It is not known (as of summer 2015) when continuous operations at 200 km/h between Riesa and Coswig will be possible.

Assuming sufficient federal funding, it was planned in mid-2008 that the line would be completed in 2014. According to the Federal Ministry of Transport in 2011, the transport project will be finalised if possible by 2016.

==== Cost ====
From 2008 to 2012, the total costs was always calculated to amount to €1,451million. Expenditure on the project amounted to €1,115 million by the end of 2013.

The European Union is contributing €50 million from the European Regional Development Fund for the financing of construction phase 3. It is estimated that approximately €222 million will be spent on upgrading the Dresden-Neustadt–Coswig section, including almost €91 million for the upgrade of the S-Bahn.

The initially planned new line was calculated to cost 3.5 billion Deutsche Mark (DM). When the project was modified to include a mixture of new and upgraded line, the total cost of the project was estimated to cost 2.675 million marks (€1.368 million on 1 January 1991 prices) in the Federal Transport Infrastructure Plan of 1992 In September 1992, the Planungsgesellschaft Bahnbau Deutsche Einheit (planning company for German Unity railway construction) estimated the same cost.

In the mid-1990s, the timeframe for the project was extended, with annual expenditure projected to grow from DM 53.4 to 289 million (instead of the previously planned DM 100–560 million), resulting in a reduction of costs to DM 2.313 billion. The planned completion of the project was thus delayed from the end of 1998 to 2008. By 1995, it was estimated that costs could be reduced to about 1.9 billion marks based on more accurate planning, based on the recent experiences and the requirements of Deutsche Bahn. While completion was not absolutely foreseeable, the estimated cost at the end of 1996 was DM 1.889 billion, of which DM 409 million had been spent by the end of 1996.

==== Economic benefits and traffic ====
A cost-benefit analysis of the development project from April 2010 provided a cost-benefit ratio of 4.2.

According to a statement of the Verkehrsverbund Oberelbe (Upper Elbe Transport Association) in April 2014, about 7,200 passengers were counted on weekdays between Dresden and Riesa or Großenhain and about 11,700 between Dresden and Radebeul. The volume of passengers increased by 6% between Dresden and Radebeul in 2011–2012.

== Route ==
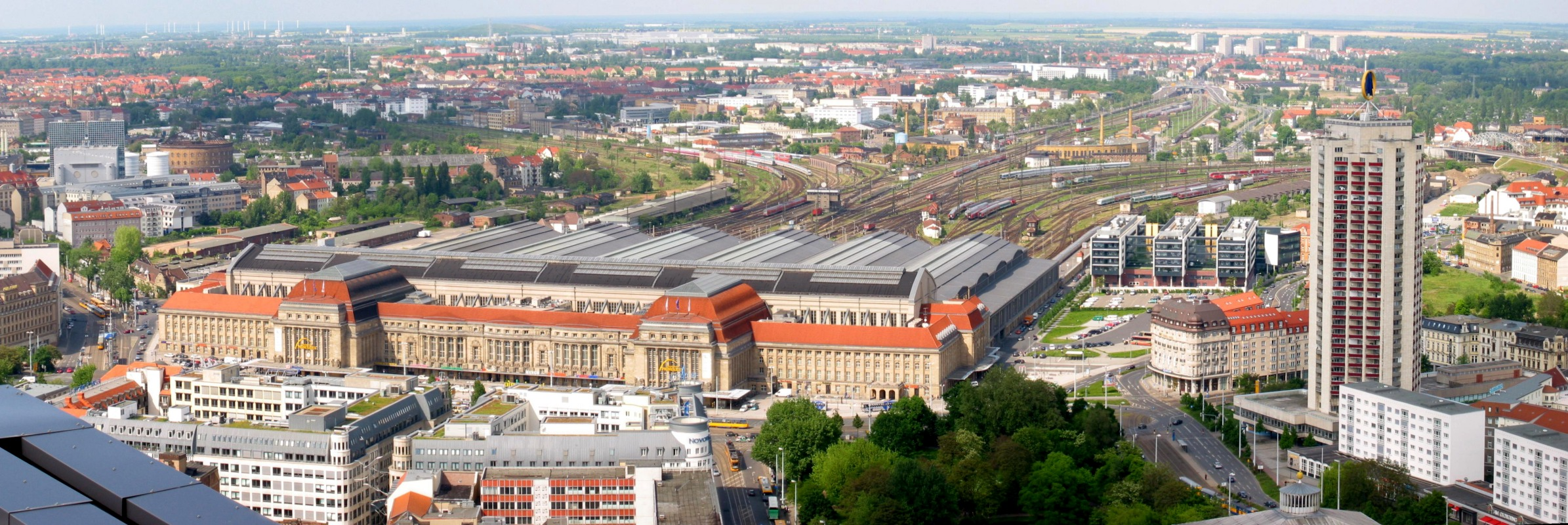
Leipzig Hauptbahnhof from the air

North of Leipzig Hauptbahnhof, the continuously double-track line turns east and runs through a densely populated area. The platforms of Leipzig-Volkmarsdorf station, which have been dismantled, lay just before the Hermann-Liebmann-Straße road bridge (km 1.9) and at the following Bennigsenstraße bridge there is a track connection from the regional depot to the old LDE locomotive depot on the line to Dresden on the other side of the Leipzig–Geithain railway. The line now continues slightly to the southeast, while the now dismantled link to the Leipzig–Hof railway, connecting to Zwickau and Plauen (–Hof), formerly ran straight ahead and then took a 90 degree turn to the south and crossed a bridge over the Leipzig–Dresden line. Immediately after the bridge of Torgauer Straße, a single-track connection ran from the line to Hof to meet the Leipzig-Dresden line near Leipzig-Sellerhausen station at Püchauerstraße junction.

The line passes under the Leipzig freight ring that runs from Leipzig-Wahren to Leipzig-Connewitz at km 3.9 and shortly afterwards it passes underneath the connecting curve between Leipzig-Schönefeld and Leipzig-Engelsdorf stations. After Leipzig-Paunsdorf the main line to Geithain branches off, which runs parallel with the Leipzig–Dresden line to this point, formerly as two tracks, but now as one track. The line continues past the Leipzig-Engelsdorf marshalling yard. In the station area, there are two connections to the Leipzig freight ring, one over the short connection at km 5.6 and the other at the eastern end of the yard at km 7.8.

The line has three tracks between Leipzig-Engelsdorf and Borsdorf. On the approach to Borsdorf, at km 9.1, the line passes under Autobahn 14, which was completed in 1939. Just one kilometre after that is the point in Althen where trains from Leipzig terminated at the end of the first stage of the line's construction in 1837. A memorial stone was erected there in 1987. In Borsdorf station, the second Leipzig–Dresden line branches off via Döbeln. In Machern there is a three-kilometer long and up to twelve metre deep cutting. It was one of the largest pieces of earthworks on the line.

In Wurzen, the line which has run steadily to the northeast from Borsdorf reaches its most northerly point and crosses the Mulde. The Mulde bridge, the first German railway bridge, was built in 1837–38 by August Königsdorfer as a simple wooden structure that was 384 m long, surpassing the 19-span bridge over the Elbe at Riesa by 39 m. The Mulde Valley Railway began in Wurzen station and ran via Großbothen for Glauchau and its northern extension ran to Eilenburg, both classified as branch lines. The Mulde Valley Railway's connection to the waterglass factory in Dehnitz continues in use. At the next junction at Kornhain, the line to Eilenburg connected to the line from Dresden for a second time. The connecting curve, which was built mainly for military reasons, was occasionally used for diversions.

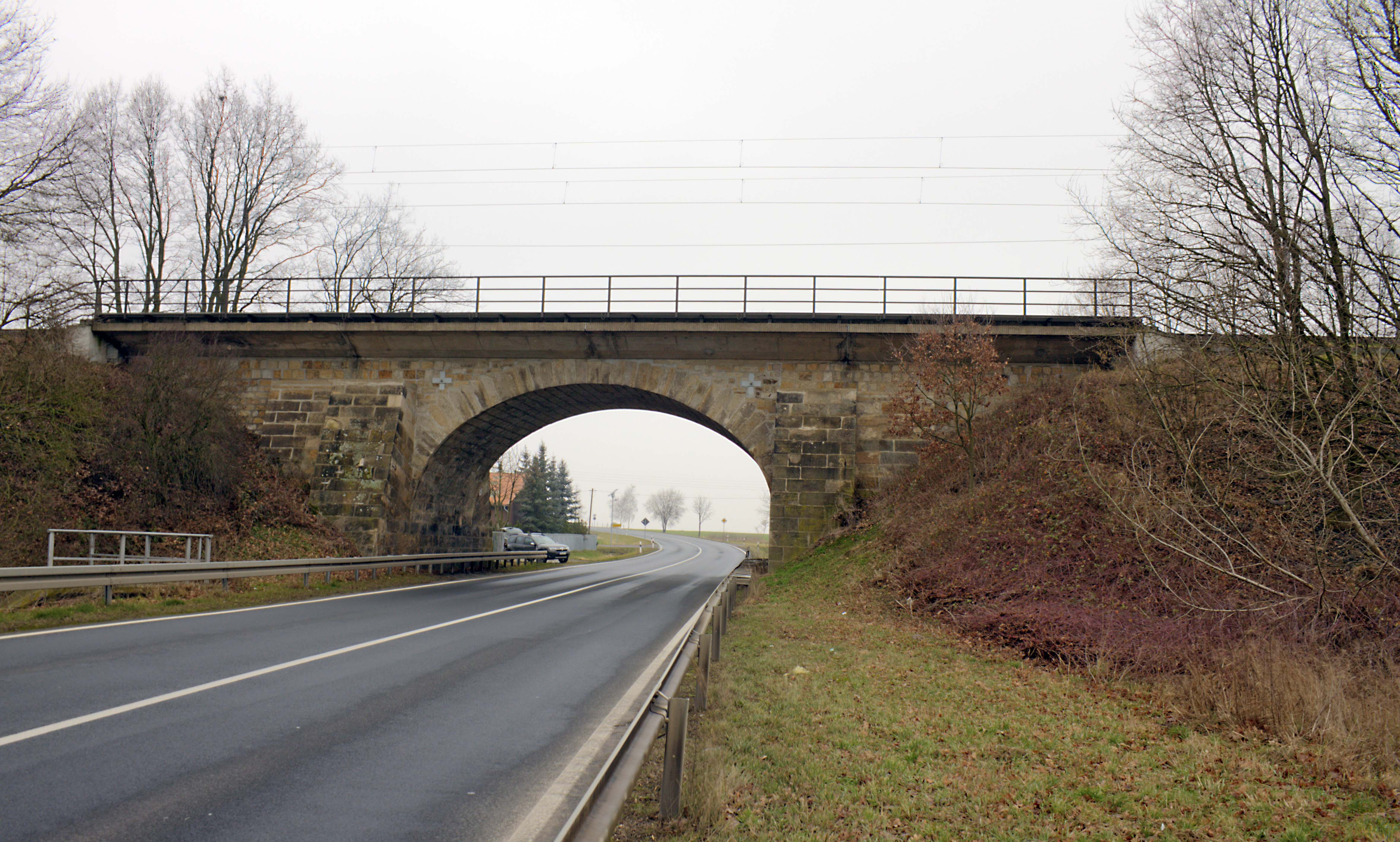
Oldest operating German railway bridge, built in 1838

At km 29.25, the line crosses federal highway 6 on the oldest still-used railway bridge in Germany, which was built in 1838. The line now runs to the southeast, passing north of the Collmberg, which rises to 312 metres above sea level, and runs through a curve to the left to Oschatz station, which is north of the town. The 750 mm gauge railway to Mügeln (part of the Mügeln railway network) still begins next to Oschatz station; formerly another 750 mm gauge line ran to Strehla. 500 metres past the station, the line ran until 1995 over a viaduct with three arches and then another bridge over the Döllnitz river. Both bridges were, until 1847, part of a viaduct that was 406 m long and consists of 25 arches. This was replaced by an embankment. During the upgrade of the line in 1995, the arch on the Döllnitz crossing was widened, while the rest of the Döllnitz viaduct is no longer used. A little further down the line, a standard gauge track was built in the 1980s, connecting at the Mannschatz crossing loop and running over an old narrow-gauge track bed to Strehla in order to create a bypass of the Riesa Elbe bridge as a preparation for war.

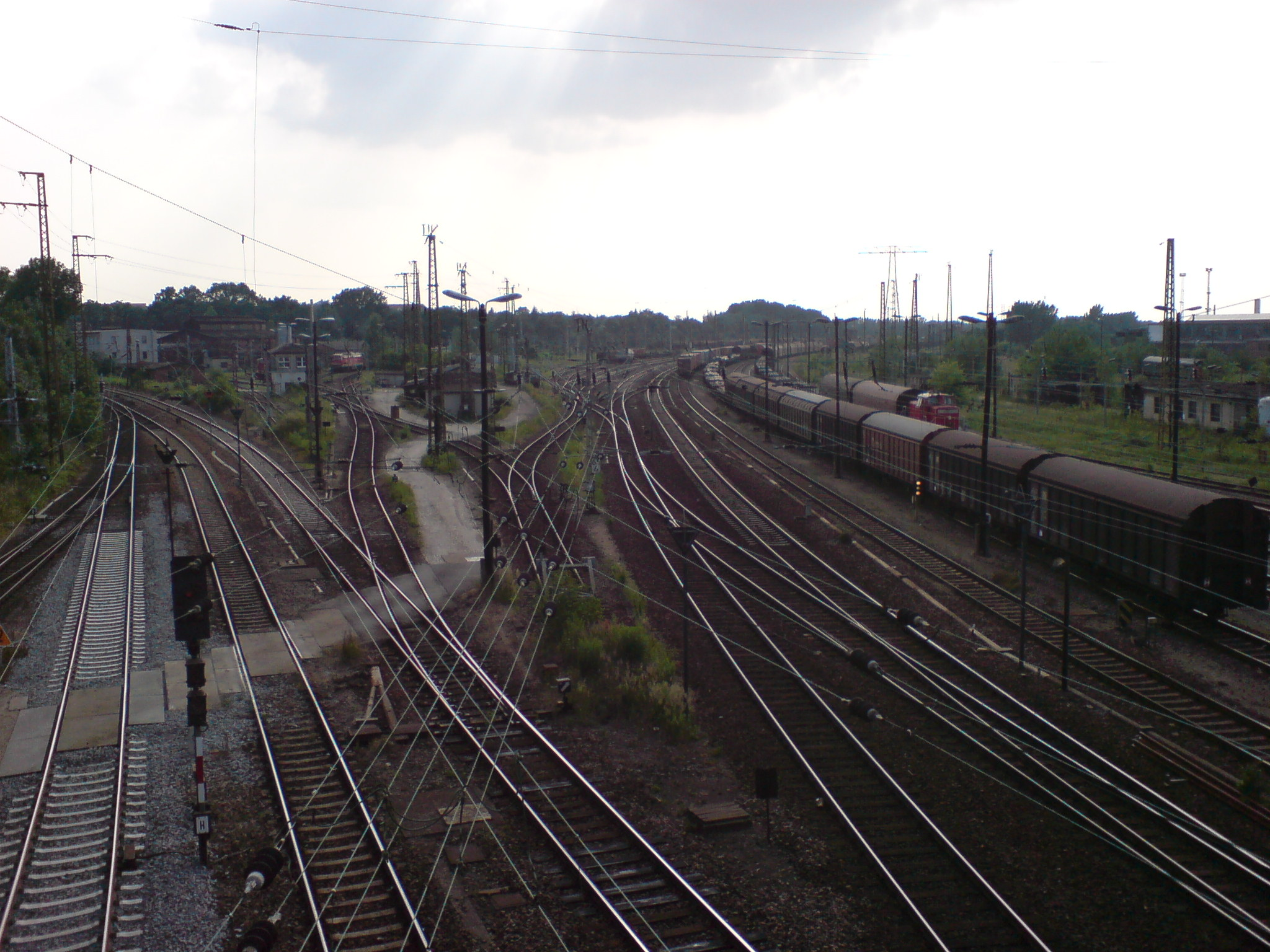
Junction in Riesa: left to Chemnitz, right to Leipzig

The line runs eastward to Riesa, where the lines from Chemnitz and Nossen branch off. Beyond the station, it crosses the Elbe on a tied-arch bridge that was built from 1964 to 1966. In Röderau and Zeithain, there are two junctions to lines to Falkenberg (Elster) and to Elsterwerda. The line now turns to run southeast and crosses to Elbe-Elster barge canal in Glaubitz. After Weißig, the line to Böhla, which opened in 2010, carries the high-speed passenger services to the Berlin–Dresden railway to complete their approach to Dresden. The line crosses federal highway 101 in Priestewitz, where the Großenhain–Priestewitz railway branches off to connect with the Großenhain–Cottbus railway.

From here the line runs to the south generally parallel with the Berlin-Dresden railway. It formerly passed through the famous 515 m long 9.6 m-wide Oberau Tunnel, which was built by 500 master miners from Freiberg and 2,000 assistants over 3 years to 1839. This was converted into a cutting in 1933. At the level of the former eastern portal of the tunnel above the cutting there is a monument to the tunnel in the form of one of the ornamental pillars of the tunnel entrance. Niederau station (km 95.7) has the second oldest railway station building in Germany, which was the oldest operating station building in Germany for a long time until its sale in the early 2000s. Shortly later the line reaches Weinböhla station, which was opened on 15 December 2002. At km 98.6 in Coswig, it is still possible to see the remains of the connecting curve to Neusörnewitz on the line to Döbeln, which was closed in 1993. After the crossing of the lines from Berlin and Leipzig, the Berlin–Dresden railway crosses the Elbe and runs on its south bank to Dresden-Friedrichstadt yard. The Leipzig–Dresden line continues on the north bank of the Elbe via Radebeul to Dresden-Neustadt, where just before the station it connects with the Dresden–Görlitz railway. The Leipzig–Dresden line continues through the inner city of Dresden and crosses the Elbe a second time over the Marien Bridge (Marienbrücke), to meet the line from Berlin and the Dresden–Werdau railway, which together fan out and turn towards Dresden Hauptbahnhof, where they end. The line continues as the Dresden–Děčín railway, also known as the Elbe Valley Railway.
