= Großenhain–Priestewitz railway =

Railway line in Germany

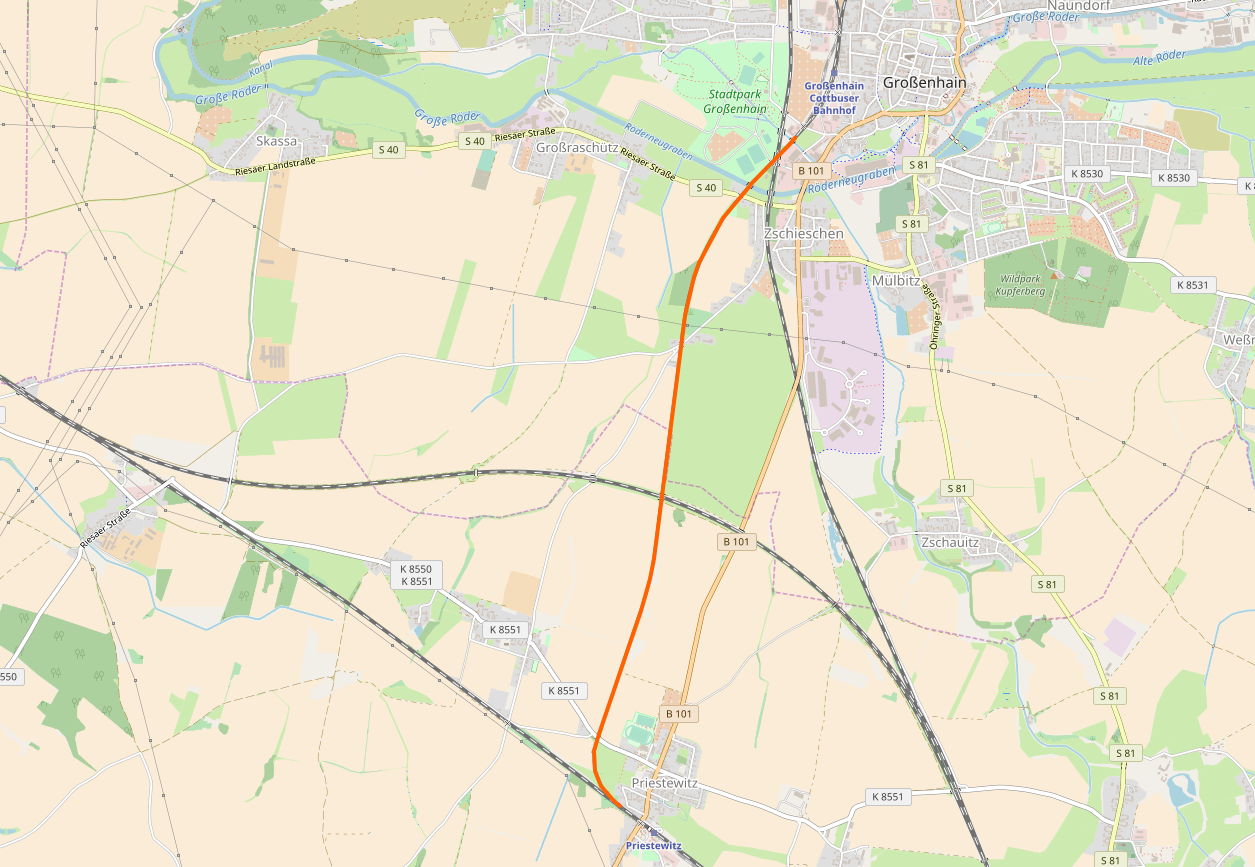

Overview
- Line number: 6252
- Locale: Saxony, Germany
- Termini: Großenhain Cottbuser station; Priestewitz station

Service
- Route number: 208

Technical
- Line length: 5.034 km (3.128 mi)
- Track gauge: 1,435 mm (4 ft 8 1/2 in) standard gauge
- Minimum radius: 290
- Electrification: 15 kV/16.7 Hz AC overhead catenary
- Operating speed: 100 km/h (62.1 mph) (maximum)
- Maximum incline: 1.0%

The Großenhain–Priestewitz railway is a single-track electrified main line in the German state of Saxony, which was originally built by the Großenhain Branch Railway Company (Zweig-Eisenbahngesellschaft zu Großenhain). It runs from Großenhain to Priestewitz and is part of the long-distance line from Cottbus to Dresden. The railway is also called the Celery Railway (Selleriebahn).

== History ==
Großenhain desired a railway connection early on. Therefore, some citizens of Großenhain established a joint stock company for the construction of a branch line from Priestewitz station on the Leipzig–Dresden railway in 1861. The five kilometre-long line was opened on 14 October 1862. The management was taken over by the Leipzig-Dresden Railway Company (Leipzig-Dresdener Eisenbahn-Gesellschaft, LDE) on behalf of its owner.

The neighbouring Kingdom of Prussia issued a concession to the Cottbus-Großenhain Railway Company (Cottbus-Großenhainer Eisenbahn-Gesellschaft, CGE) for the continuation of the existing line to Cottbus in June 1868. This project was authorised by an international treaty between Saxony and Prussia signed on 15 August 1868. Prussia was given the right to determine the timetables and fares on the new line. Saxony was levied for a portion of its financial cost. Prussia also received a right of first refusal for the purchase of the Großenhain–Priestewitz line. On 24 September 1868, the Saxon government also granted the new company the concession.

The LDE was very interested in the new connection to Prussia. The expansion of its operations to the east with a connection to the planned line of the Halle-Sorau-Guben Railway Company (Halle-Sorau-Gubener Eisenbahn-Gesellschaft, HSGE) promised good profits. The LDE eventually acquired shares in the Cottbus-Großenhain Railway Company worth 1.5 million marks. The new line was put into operation on 20 April 1870. Again the LDE took over operational management on behalf of its owner. Since the Großenhain–Priestewitz line has been part of a continuous long-distance connection between Dresden and Cottbus.

On 1 July 1869, the LDE bought the Großenhain Branch Railway Company. Thus the Großenhain–Priestewitz line was now part of the LDE network.

With the opening of the Berlin–Dresden railway by the Berlin-Dresden Railway Company on 17 June 1875, Großenhain now had two stations. The existing station on the line to Cottbus was renamed the Großenhain Cottbuser Bahnhof (Großenhain Cottbus line station) and the new station was called the Grossenhain Berliner Bahnhof (Großenhain Berlin line station). At the same time, a 920-metre-long connecting track was opened for the exchange of wagons.

In July 1876, the LDE was nationalised and the Großenhain–Priestewitz line now belonged to the network of the Royal Saxon State Railways (Königlich Sächsische Staatseisenbahnen).The connection to the Prussian railway was nationalised in September 1883 and became part of the network of the Prussian state railways.

Since 15 December 2002, all regional trains on the Elsterwerda–Dresden route have run over the Großenhain–Priestewitz line and the connecting line opened between two Großenhain stations in 1875. The Berlin line station on the Berlin–Dresden railway was abandoned as a stop for passenger trains. In 2011, the Großenhain–Priestewitz line was used by Regional-Express services on the Elsterwerda–Dresden, Cottbus–Dresden and Hoyerswerda–Dresden routes. Freight transport is of minor significance.

== Description of the route ==
The Großenhain–Priestewitz line has its station in Großenhain to the west of the historic town centre. From there it runs almost straight to the south through a landscape area called the Großenhainer Pflege, running roughly parallel to federal highway 101. After about three kilometres, it crosses over a grade-separated crossing of the Weißig–Böhla railway, which was opened in December 2010. The line takes a turn to the left and reaches Priestewitz station from the northwest.

=== Stations ===
Cottbus station

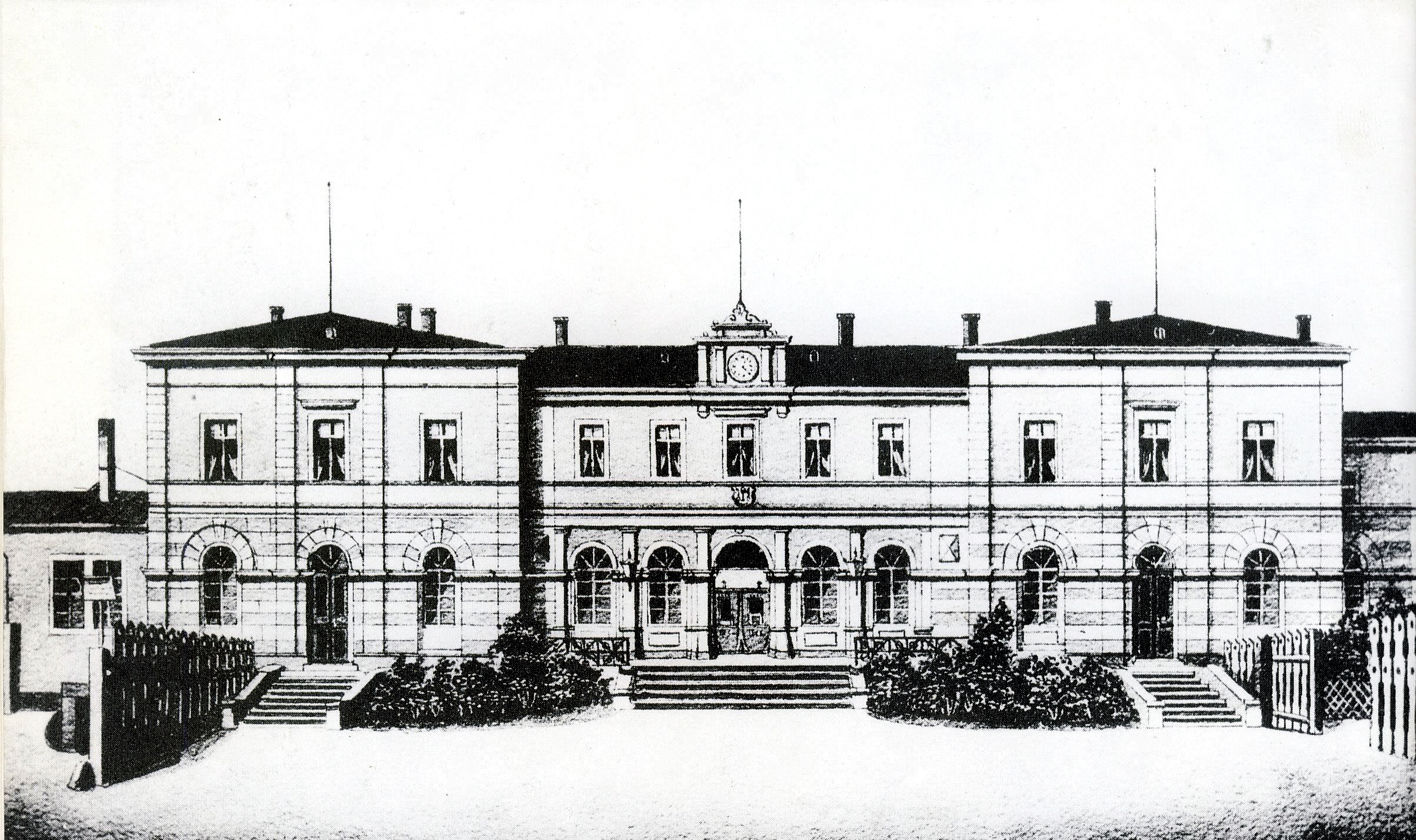
Großenhain Cottbuser station (1870)

The current Cottbus station in Großenhain was opened by the Großenhain Branch Railway Company in 1862 as the terminus of its route.

The station was upgraded by Verkehrsverbund Oberelbe (Upper Elbe Transport Association) after 2002 as a regional interchange between rail and bus services because of its urban location.

Priestewitz station

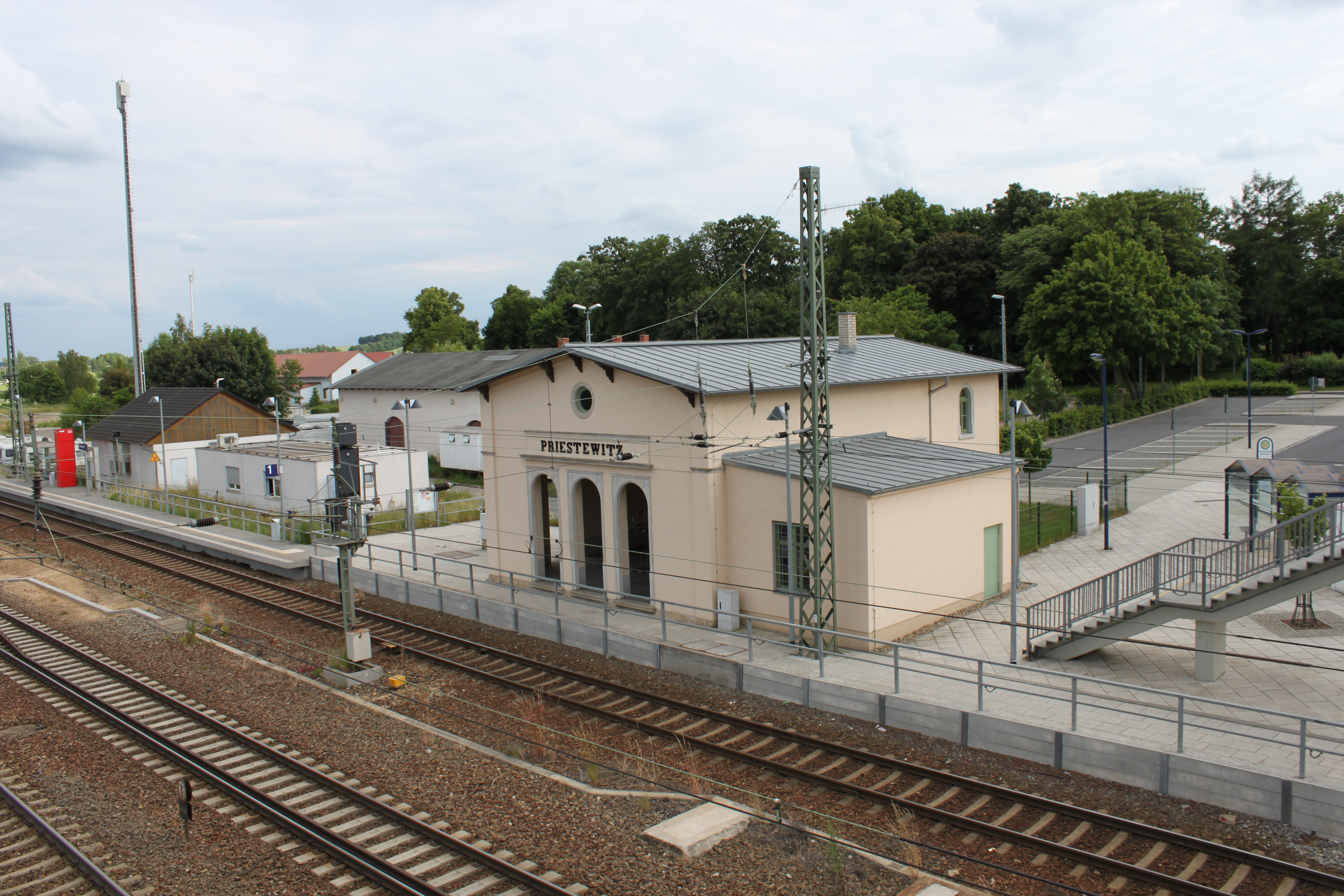
Priestewitz station (2010)

Priestewitz station was opened on 9 April 1839 during the construction of the first German long-distance railway, the Leipzig–Dresden Railway. It was established because it was near the major towns of Meissen and Großenhain, which received their own railway connections about two decades later.

Since the construction of the Großenhain–Priestewitz railway, Priestewitz has been a junction station. It is now only significant as an interchange for regional traffic. The freight facilities were dismantled after 1990.

== Rolling stock ==
Until the line’s electrification, it was operated with locomotives of classes 106 (stationed in Großenhain), 118 (stationed in Kamenz and Cottbus), 110 (stationed in Cottbus) and 132 (stationed in Cottbus and Frankfurt (Oder).

Today trains are hauled by electric locomotives of class 143 (formerly 243) based in Dresden and Cottbus.
