= Weißig–Böhla railway =

Railway line in Germany

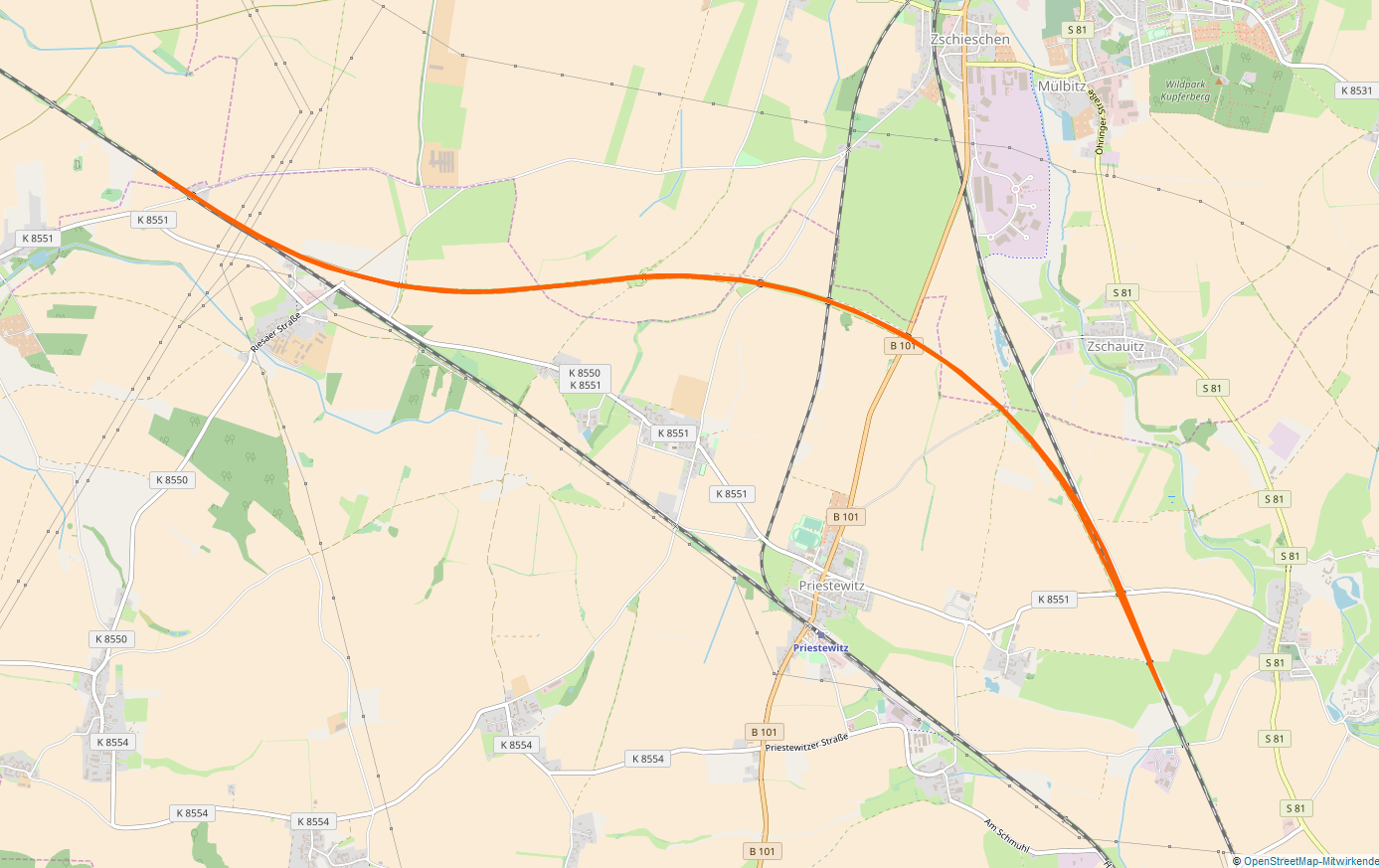

Overview
- Line number: 6274
- Locale: Saxony, Germany
- Termini: Leckwitz junction; Kottewitz junction

Service
- Route number: 500

Technical
- Line length: 7.425 km (4.614 mi)
- Track gauge: 1,435 mm (4 ft 8 1/2 in) standard gauge
- Electrification: 15 kV/16.7 Hz AC overhead catenary
- Operating speed: 160 km/h (99.4 mph) (maximum)

The Weißig–Böhla railway is a two-track, electrified main line in the German state of Saxony. It passes through an area near Großenhain called the Großenhainer Pflege and connects the Leipzig–Dresden and Berlin–Dresden railways, running between Leckwitz junction near Weißig and Kottewitz junction near Böhla. Its official opening took place after two years of construction on 3 December 2010 and the operations of regular trains started at the timetable change on 12 December 2010.

The project was built part of the second stage of German Unity Transport Project (Verkehrsprojekts Deutsche Einheit) No. 9, which also includes the upgrade of the line between Riesa and Röderau junction and between Dresden-Neustadt and Coswig. As part of the project, long-distance services between Leipzig and Dresden will be able to run at up to speed of up to 200 km/h over large parts of the line. When the project is finished a travel time of 45 minutes will be possible between the two cities.

== Route ==
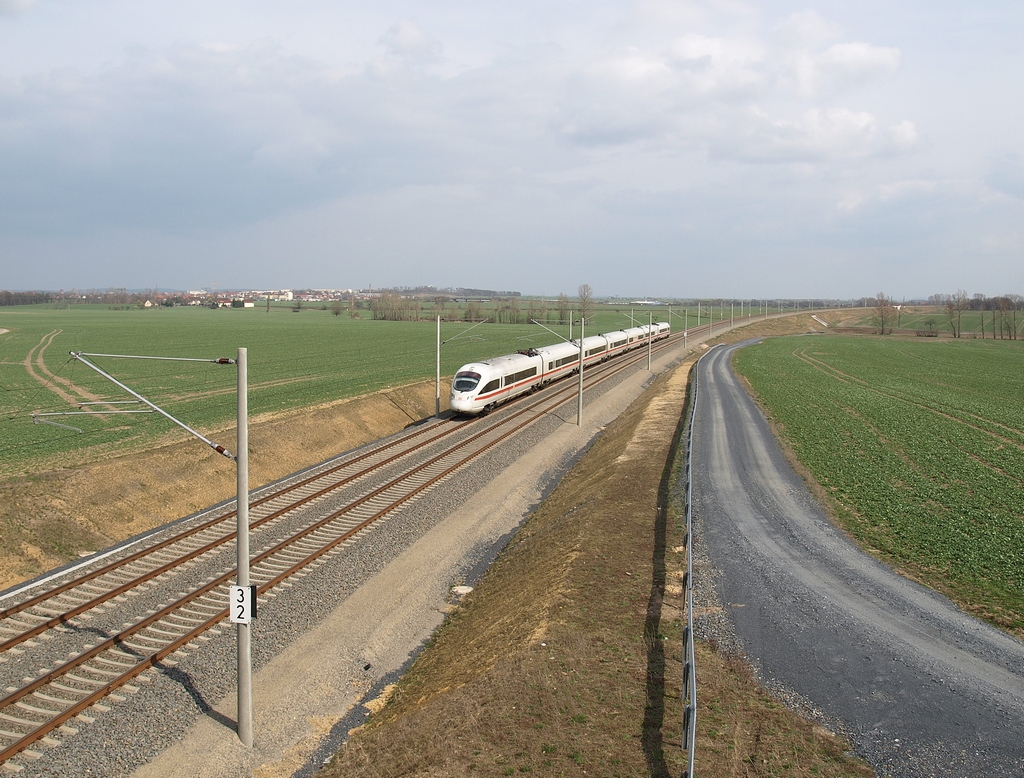
ICE to Frankfurt on the line near Strießen

At the beginning of the line in Leckwitz near Weißig, it separates at grade from the Leipzig-Dresden railway line, which at this point has four tracks, each suitable for operations at 130 km/h (2,500 m radius). From there, the line runs for 7.425 kilometres north of Strießen, Priestewitz and Kottewitz through the Großenhainer Pflege. North of Priestewitz the line crosses the Großenhain–Priestewitz railway and east of Kottewitz it connects at a grade-separated junction with the Dresden–Elsterwerda (Berlin–Dresden) line, which is designed for speeds of 200 km/h (6,000/7,000 m radius). The track running from Dresden to Leipzig is carried on a 160 m-long (520 ft) flying junction over the Berlin–Dresden line. In its course, the line also crosses national highway 101 and has a total of six railway bridges. The embankments have a height of up to 9 m (30 ft).

== History ==
Prior to German reunification, there were proposals for a connection between the two lines.

The Federal Transport Infrastructure Plan (Bundesverkehrswegeplan) of 1992 initially provided for an upgrade of both the Berlin–Dresden and the Dresden–Leipzig railways for high speed. As part of the preliminary design of 1992/1993, it was planned that the line from Leipzig to Dresden would run to the south of Riesa and cross the existing line at Medessen and connect to the route from Berlin at Böhla.

After optimisation, the section of new line starting at Riesa was discarded. Instead, there would be now only be the 13 km-long (8.1 mi) section between Böhla and Radebeul on the Berlin–Dresden railway to be upgraded for high speeds and a new link to be built with the Leipzig–Dresden railway. This would allow about 370 million marks to be saved, the effects on nature and landscape would be significantly reduced and fast and slow traffic would be separated. According to information provided by Deutsche Bahn in 2008, the connecting curve would be the most economical solution to segregate long-distance and regional traffic by concentrating long-distance transport on the fast line to the Dresden node, while the slower traffic would remain on the existing line. Furthermore, it would separate long-distance and S-Bahn traffic between Dresden-Neustadt and Coswig.

An investigation of the link between the two lines was commissioned on 8 January 1993. In March 1993, the preliminary design for a link between Neumedessen (Leipzig–Dresden railway) and Böhla (Berlin–Dresden railway), including the Kockelsberg Tunnel, was confirmed. With planning expected to be completed in December 1995, it would be possible for the project to be implemented between mid-1998 and early 2000.

The project would allow fast and slow traffic to be segregated on its approach to the Dresden railway mode. Since this section of the Berlin–Dresden railway was not used for regional services, it would in future be used only for long-distance passenger and fast freight traffic. In addition, the segregation of traffic would relieve the Coswig railway node of long-distance rail transport and permit the intensification of the regular-interval S-Bahn services to Meissen.

=== Planning ===
The joint planning process for the Riesa southern bypass and the connecting curve did not initially proceed. In March 1995 the Riesa southern bypass was removed from the plan. In May 1995, documents prepared for the regional planning process for the connection provided for a new section of line to be straightened in the area of the Kockelsberge (hills).

Originally the construction of the whole of the VDE no. 9 project was delayed until 1999 due to the absence of funding, but funds were provided for the construction of the connecting curve. Tenders were originally called in 2001, but initially archaeological excavations had to be carried out before construction could start. Tenders were called again in 2008, with completion in 2011 specified. Overall, the project comprised five construction lots.

The plan involved the building of 17 bridges and culverts and 7 km embankment. The line speed was set as 160 km/h with provision for a further upgrade to 200 km/h. Currently, the route is only protected by Punktförmige Zugbeeinflussung (PZB) train control.

=== Construction and opening ===
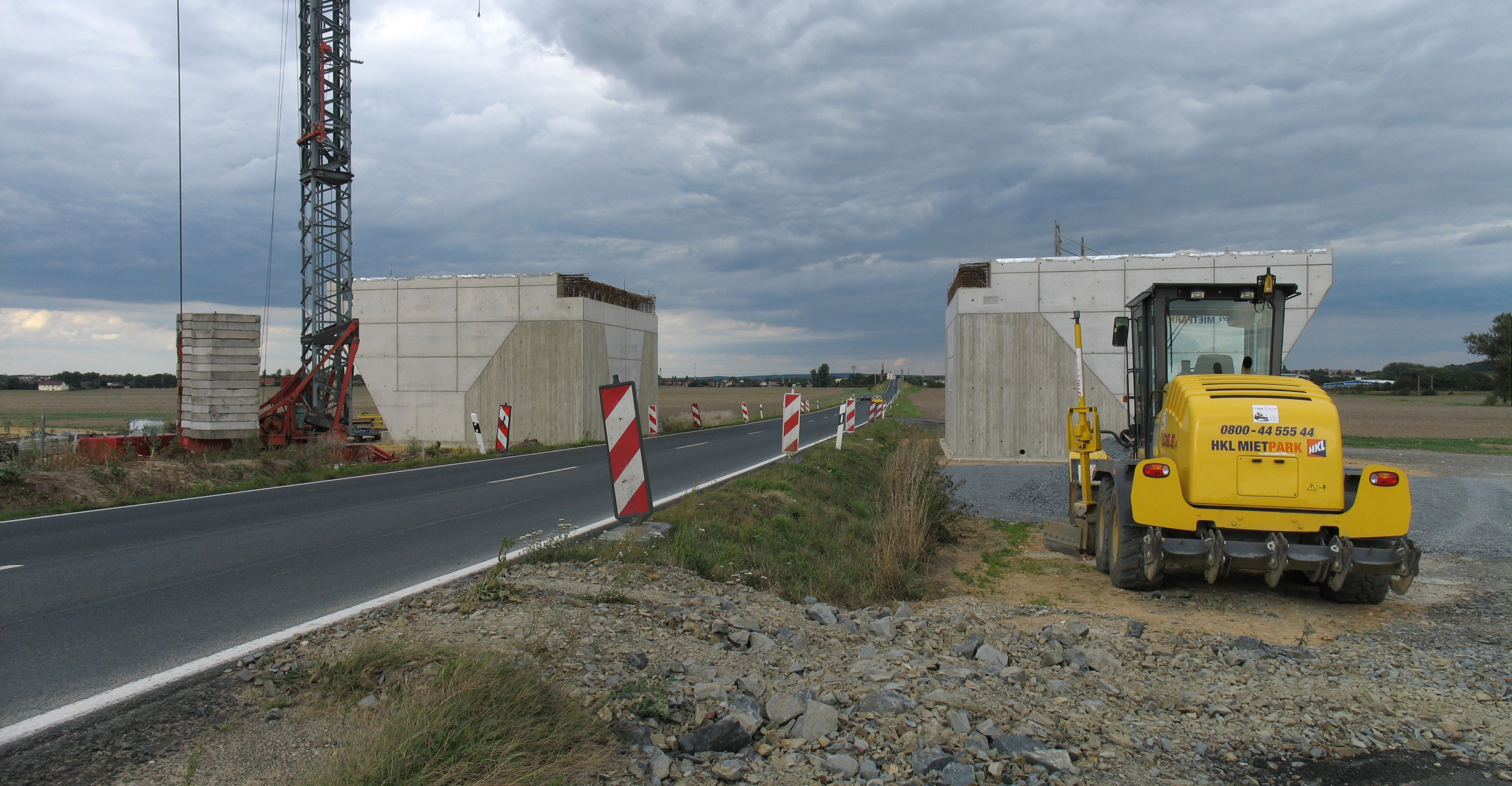
Bridge over the B 101 under construction (30 August 2009)

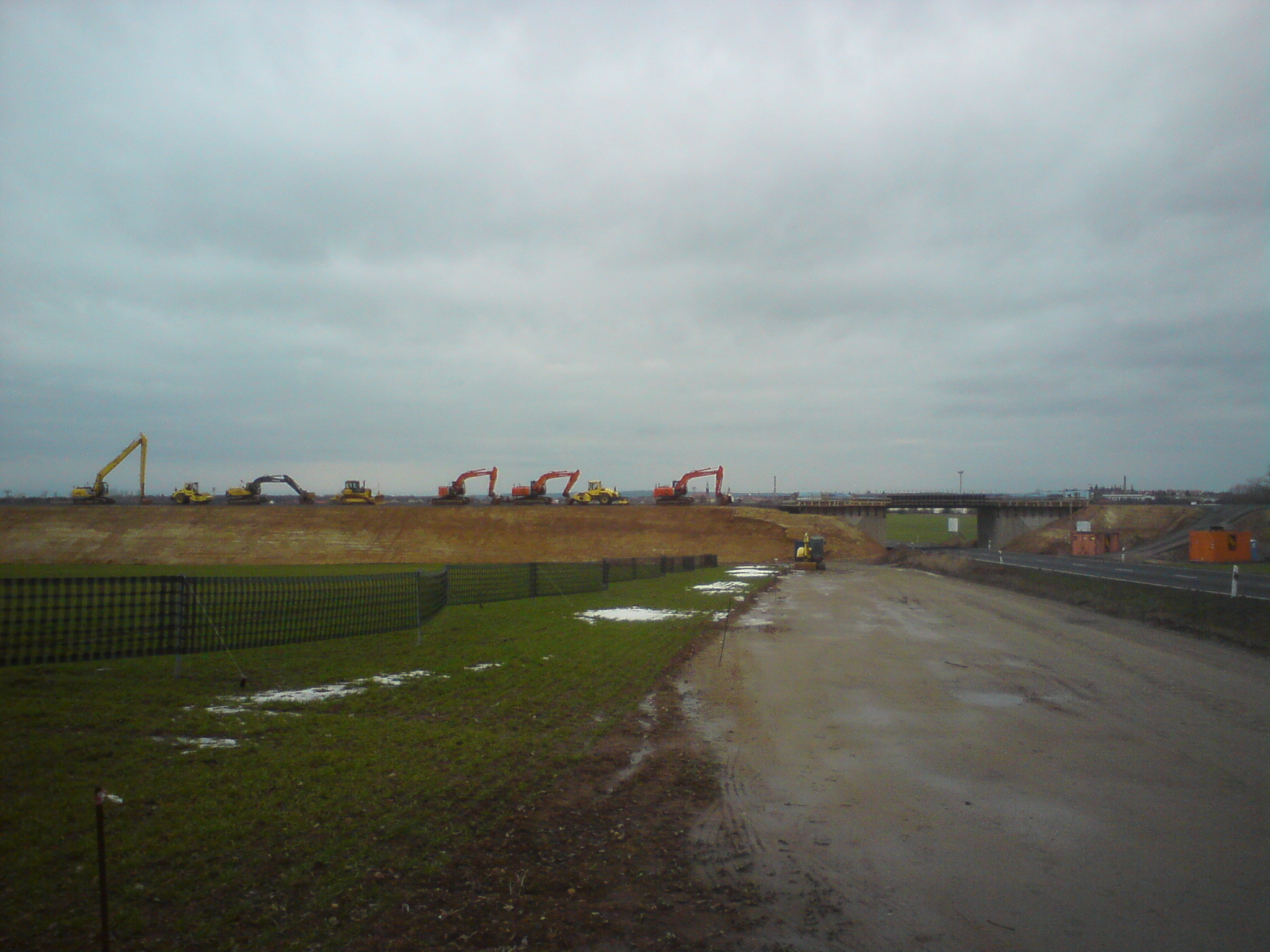
Construction of the railway embankment over the B 101 (28 December 2009)

Before the start of the actual construction, excavations were carried out in 2002 under the direction of the State Office of Archaeology. The remains of ancient settlements were protected along the planned route. Jewelry from the Roman Iron Age were found along with shards and wooden posts that suggested the floor plans of former houses. The actual start of construction on the first construction lot occurred in 2008.

The project was divided into two sub-sections:

- phase 1 included the construction of Leckwitz junction (around March–December 2009) and the establishment of new rail infrastructure (between September 2009 and May 2010);
- phase 2 included the establishment of Kottewitz junction (between December 2009 and December 2010), the establishment of electronic interlockings in Weißig and Böhla and land restoration.

The railway embankment was largely completed over a length of around 5.5 km by early December 2009. The construction of the last section, including the connection to the Berlin–Dresden line, was carried out during a full closure of the Großenhain–Radebeul-Naundorf section for one year from mid-December 2009.

The line was opened on 3 December 2010 and full services were commenced at the timetable change on 12 December 2010.

== Cost ==
The total cost of the line, including the planning costs, amounted to €89.3 million. About €3 million of this was spent by December 2008 for land acquisition and the selection of the site for the flying junction.

== Technology ==
Leckwitz junction is controlled from the ESTW-Z class electronic control centre at Priestewitz and an ESTW-A electronic control centre in Weißig. A second dispatcher's workstation was activated in the Priestewitz electronic control centre. The points at the junction with the Berlin–Dresden railway is controlled by the Kottewitz ESTW-A electronic control centre, which is in the Böhla station area.

The cant is up to 100 mm.
