= Großenhain Cottbuser Bahnhof =

Railway station in Großenhain, Germany

Großenhain Cottb Bf
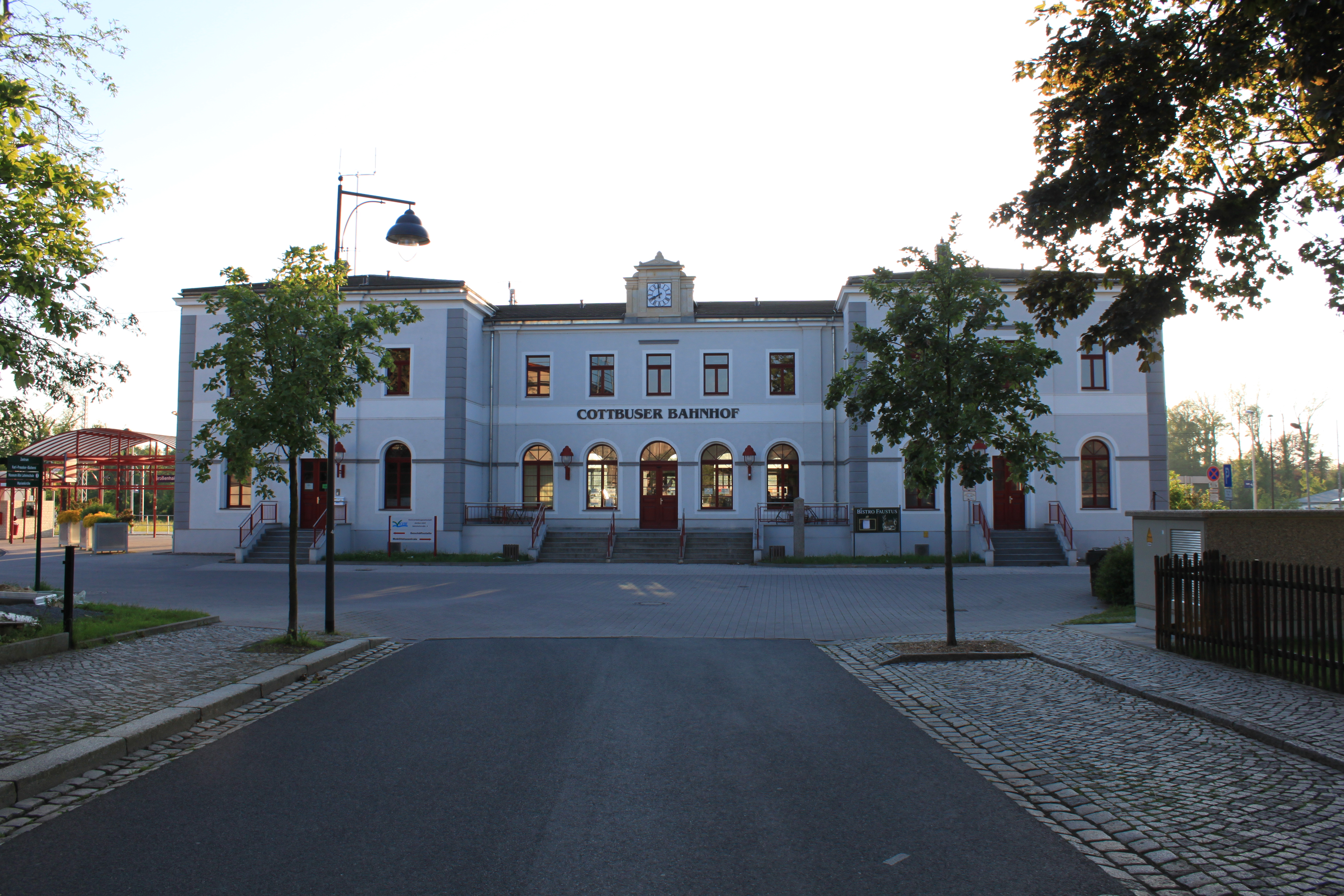

General information
- Location: Großenhain, Saxony; Germany
- Coordinates: 51°17′29″N 13°31′25″E
- Lines: Großenhain–Priestewitz railway; Großenhain–Cottbus railway; Berlin–Dresden railway
- Platforms: 2

Construction
- Accessible: Yes

Other information
- Station code: 2340
- DS100 code: DGC
- IBNR: 8011749
- Category: 5
- Website: www.bahnhof.de

History
- Opened: 14 October 1862

Services
Preceding station	DB Regio Nordost	Following station
Priestewitz towards Dresden Hbf	RE 15	Lampertswalde towards Hoyerswerda
Priestewitz towards Dresden Hbf	RE 18	Lampertswalde towards Cottbus Hbf
Priestewitz towards Dresden Hbf	RB 31	Zabeltitz towards Elsterwerda-Biehla
Location
- Location within Saxony

Großenhain Cottbus station (German: Großenhain Cottbuser Bahnhof) was opened on 14 October 1862 by the Großenhain Branch Railway Company (Zweig-Eisenbahngesellschaft zu Großenhain) as the Leipzig station (Leipziger Bahnhof), located on the line from Priestewitz to Cottbus.

== History ==
The line from Großenhain to Cottbus was opened on 20 April 1870. The 920-metre-long rail link to the Berlin station (Großenhain Berliner Bahnhof) was opened on 17 June 1875.

Since 15 December 2002, all passenger services have operated through the Cottbus line station, and the Berlin line station has been closed as a stop for passenger services. In addition, a modern interchange for regional and city buses has been built by Kreisverkehrsgesellschaft Riesa-Großenhain, the company in charge of the management of buses in the district.

== Description ==
The station is equipped with two platform tracks for passenger services and two mainline tracks, for freight traffic. Between the tracks a roundhouse still existed until December 2007.

There are several sidings for freight, as well as two local branch lines. The Agro Service Großenhain used one branch line and ran for a few meters parallel with the Berlin–Dresden railway towards Böhla.

The second branch line runs to the north of the main track towards Lampertswalde and was previously connected with the airfield and the former paper mill. The siding from the paper mill was used for several years by the ITL Eisenbahngesellschaft of Dresden and served as a recycling facility. Currently, no freight is handled at Großenhain.

== Services ==
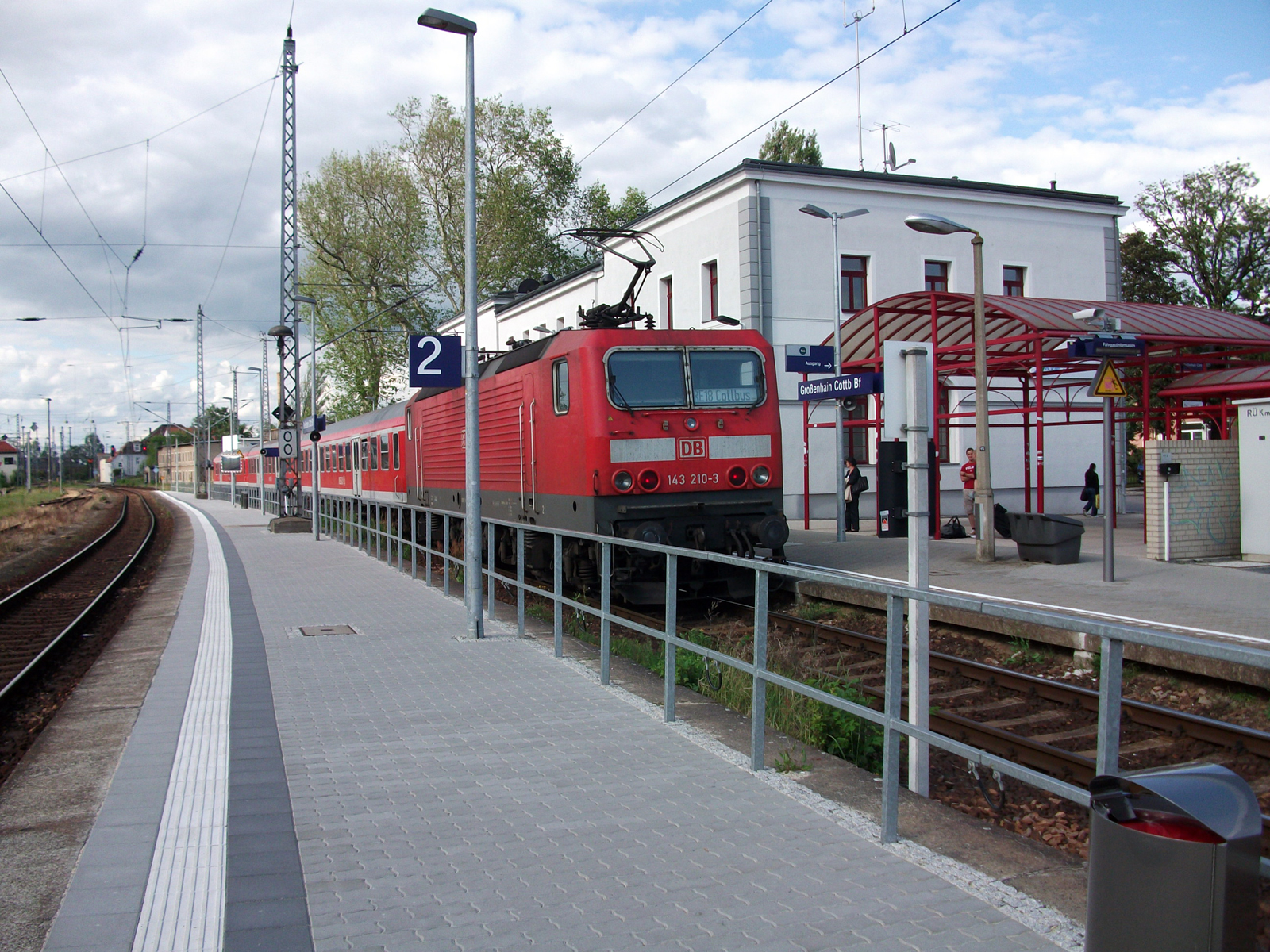
Platforms with an RE 18 service to Cottbus

The station is now served by the following passenger services:

Line	Route	Frequency	Operator
RE 15	Dresden – Cossebaude – Großenhain – Ruhland – Hosena – Hoyerswerda	Every two hours	DB Regio
RE 18	Dresden – Großenhain – Ruhland – Senftenberg – Cottbus	Every two hours	DB Regio
RB 31	Dresden – Cossebaude – Großenhain – Elsterwerda – Elsterwerda-Biehla	Every two hours	DB Regio
