= Seelitz =

- Municipality
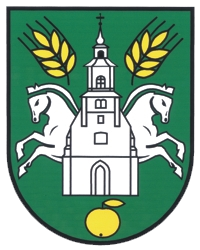
- Coat of arms

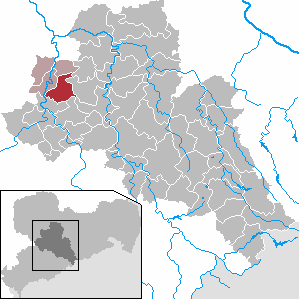
- Location of Seelitz within Mittelsachsen district
- Interactive map of Seelitz
- Location within Germany Location within Saxony
- Coordinates: 51°1′53″N 12°49′14″E
- Country: Germany
- State: Saxony
- District: Mittelsachsen
- Subdivisions: 24

Government
  - Mayor (2022–29): Thomas Oertel

Area
  - Total: 31.22 km^{2} (12.05 sq mi)
- Elevation: 224 m (735 ft)

Population (2025-12-31)
  - Total: 1,591
  - Density: 50.96/km^{2} (132.0/sq mi)
- Time zone: UTC+01:00 (CET)
  - Summer (DST): UTC+02:00 (CEST)
- Postal codes: 09306
- Dialling codes: 03737
- Vehicle registration: FG
- Website: www.gemeinde-seelitz.de/

Seelitz (German pronunciation: [ˈzeːlɪts]) is a municipality in the district of Mittelsachsen, in Saxony, Germany. It is part of the administrative partnership Verwaltungsgemeinschaft Rochlitz based in the eponymous town.

== Geography ==
The village of Seelitz is situated about 2 km south-east of Rochlitz and 13 km north-east of Mittweida, above the river Zwickauer Mulde. The following communities have been incorporated:

- Beedeln
- Bernsdorf
- Biesern
- Döhlen
- Fischheim
- Gröblitz
- Gröbschütz
- Kolkau
- Köttern
- Neudörfchen
- Neuwerder
- Neuzschaagwitz
- Pürsten
- Seebitzschen
- Sörnzig
- Spernsdorf
- Städten
- Steudten
- Winkeln
- Zetteritz
- Zöllnitz
- Zschaagwitz
- Zschauitz

== History ==
=== Local history ===
Seelitz and the neighbouring villages are of Slavic origin. Although there is no written evidence, this is proven by archeological finds, mostly pottery shards, by Slavic burgwalls such as those near Fischheim and Köttern, by the names of populated places and landscape features, and by the layout and size of the historic land parcels in the communities.

The place is first mentioned in writing as Seliz in an 1174 deed of donation, according to which margrave Dedo the Fat of Lusatia gave four Hufen of Land in Seelitz to the newly founded Zschillen monastery.

The spelling of the place name has changed little since then:

- 1174: Seliz
- 1205 and 1378: Selicz
- 1489: Zelitcz
- 1548: Selietz
- 1791: Seelitz

The name had Old Sorbian origins, but its original meaning is unclear. It may be derived from a person's name Želidrog, shortened to Žel, or from zel, which means 'green'

During the Thirty Years' War and in later conflicts Seelitz suffered from marauding troops and epidemics.

Seelitz belonged administratively to Amt Rochlitz. Since the population of the neighbouring villages had to attend church services in Seelitz, it became an ecclesiastical centre of the region.

Following the incorporation of other communities during the 20th century, Seelitz now has 24 constituent parts.

| Former community | Date | Notes |
|---|---|---|
| Beedeln | 1 July 1965 | incorporated into Kolkau |
| Bernsdorf (Seelitz) | 1 May 1936 | incorporated into Beedeln |
| Biesern | 1 July 1950 | incorporated into Steudten |
| Döhlen (Seelitz) | 1 March 1969 | |
| Fischheim | 1 July 1950 | incorporated into Steudten |
| Gröblitz | 1 July 1950 | |
| Gröbschütz | 1 March 1974 | |
| Großstädten | 1 April 1935 | joined Kleinstädten to form Städten |
| Kleinstädten | 1. April 1935 | joined Großstädten to form Städten |
| Kolkau | 1 April 1993 | |
| Kolkau, Gutsbezirk | ca. 1922 | incorporated into Kolkau |
| Köttern | 1 July 1950 | incorporated into Spernsdorf |
| Neudörfchen (Seelitz) | prior to 1875 | incorporated into Döhlen |
| Neutaubenheim, Gutsbezirk | ca. 1922 | incorporated into Döhlen |
| Neuwerder | prior to 1875 | incorporated into Döhlen |
| Pürsten (Seelitz) | 1 July 1950 | |
| Seebitzschen | 1 July 1950 | incorporated into Steudten |
| Sörnzig | 1 July 1950 | incorporated into Steudten |
| Spernsdorf | 1 April 1993 | |
| Städten | 1 July 1950 | incorporated into Zetteritz |
| Steudten (Seelitz) | 1 January 1994 | |
| Winkeln (Seelitz) | 1 March 1963; 1. Januar 1994 | incorporated into Zschoppelshain transferred to Seelitz |
| Zetteritz | 1 January 1994 | |
| Zetteritz, Gutsbezirk | ca. 1922 | incorporated into Zetteritz |
| Zöllnitz (Seelitz) | 1 April 1935 | incorporated into Seebitzschen |
| Zschaagwitz (mit Neuzschaagwitz) | 1 July 1950 | incorporated into Spernsdorf |
| Zschauitz (Seelitz) | 1 July 1950 | incorporated into Gröbschütz |

=== Ecclesiastical history ===
According to the Meißnische Chronika ('Misnian Chronicle'), the church of Seelitz dates back into the 8th century.
The parish of Seelit was formed around the year 1000 and became part of the diocese of Meißen, after the country around Rochlitz had been occupied by German settlers who had come from Franconia. By this time, the Sorbian population had formally converted to Christianity. Violent acts in connection with the Christian mission are not reported from this area.

The lapidary inscriptions of the year dates 1516 and 1529 on the village church St Anna indicate that at this time a romanesque church dating from the 11th century had been replaced by the extant hall church in late gothic style.

Around 1430 Seelitz suffered from the invasion of Hussitic troops, during which time the church was destroyed. Seelitz joined the Protestant Reformation comparatively early, the local school which was erected in 1527 was probably already Protestant from the beginning.

From 1769 to 1761, the local church was rebuilt in baroque style under the direction of Wiederau carpenter Michael Mäßig and was fitted with matronea. Altar and pulpit (1770/1771) as well as the baptismal font in rococo style were made by Penig sculptor Johann Gottfried Stecher (1718–1776).

Over time, Seelitz became a regional ecclesiastical centre, and with 23 constituting villages it forms the largest territorial parish in Saxony.

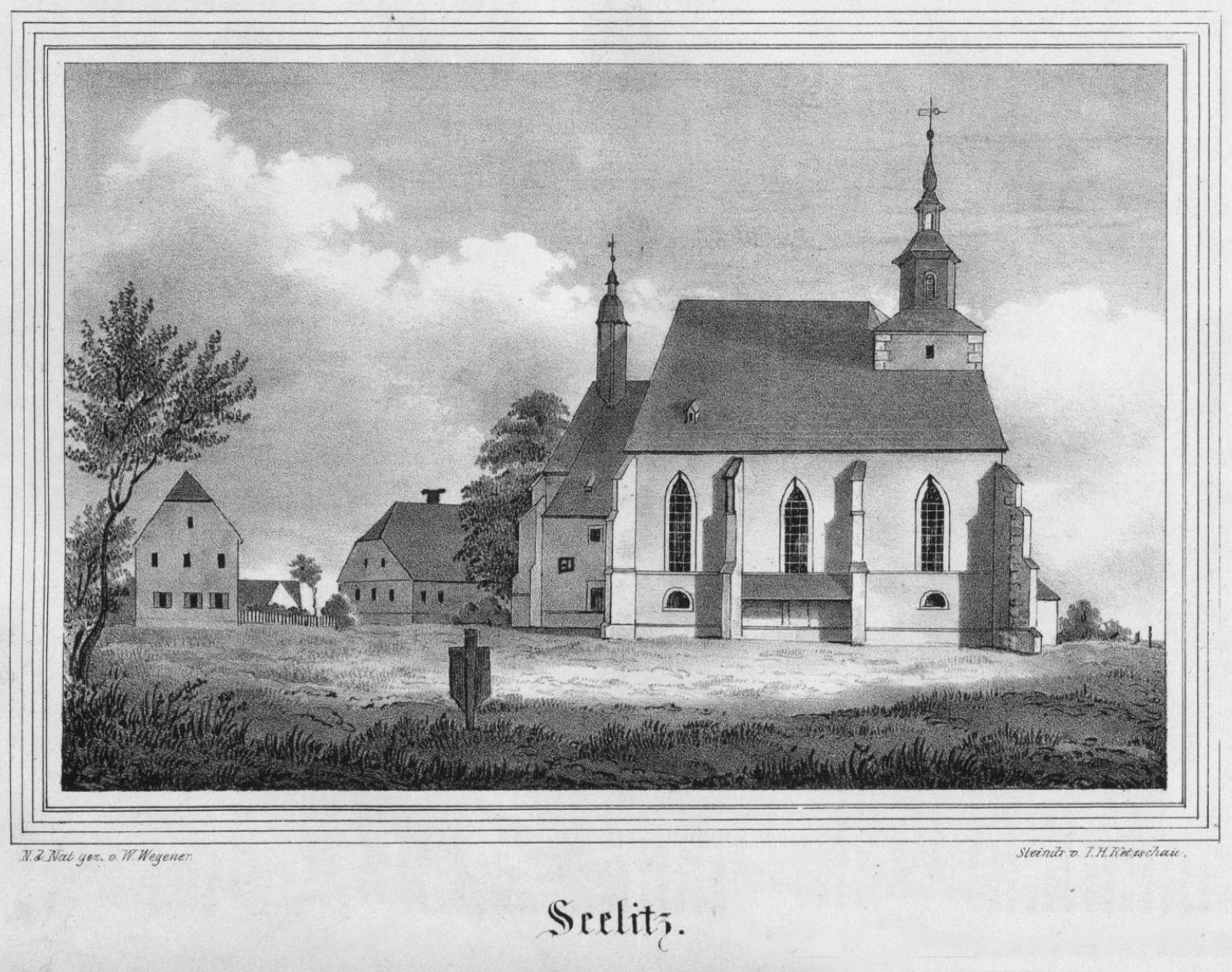
St. Anna, ca. 1840

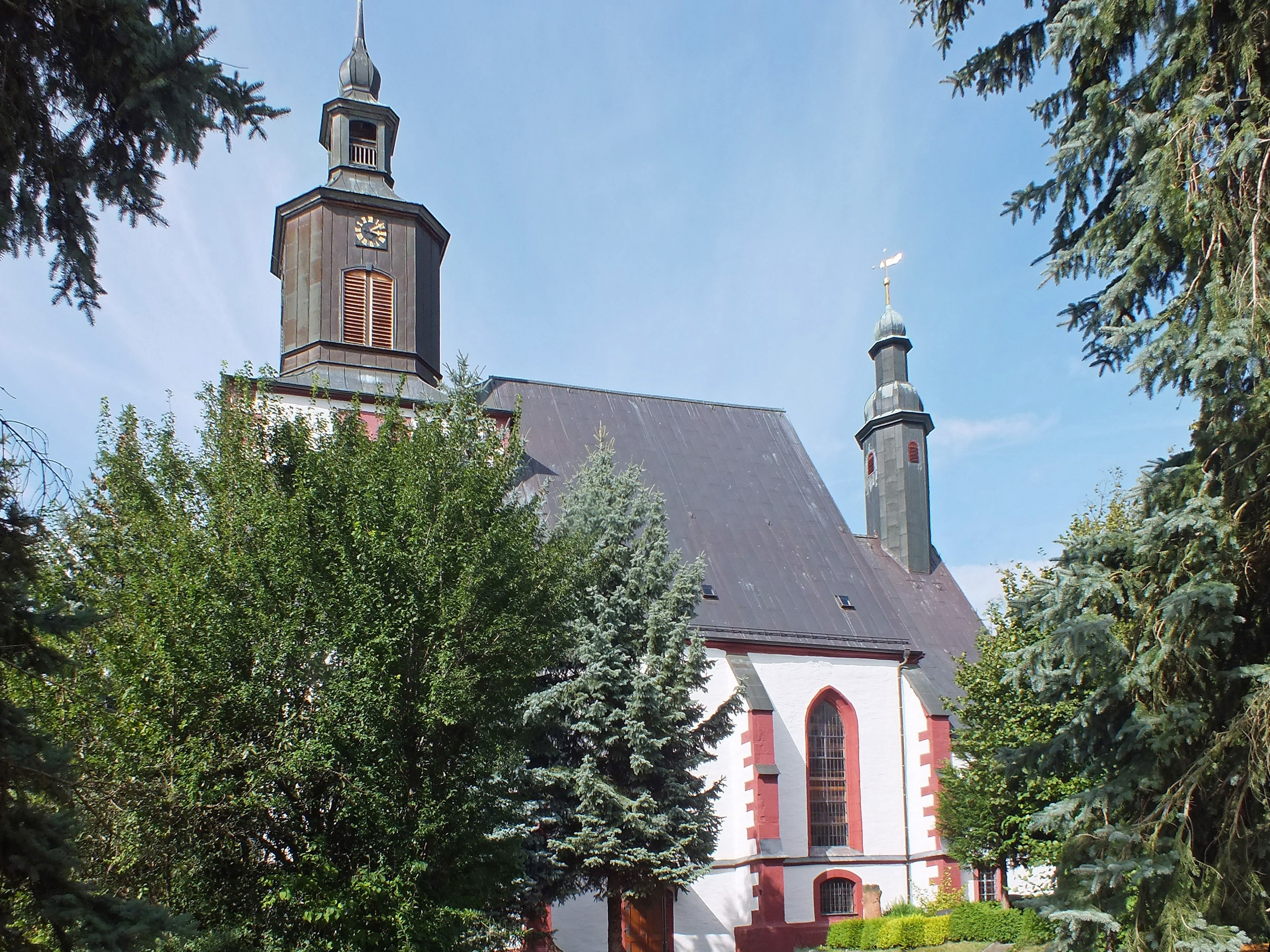
St. Anna, 2012

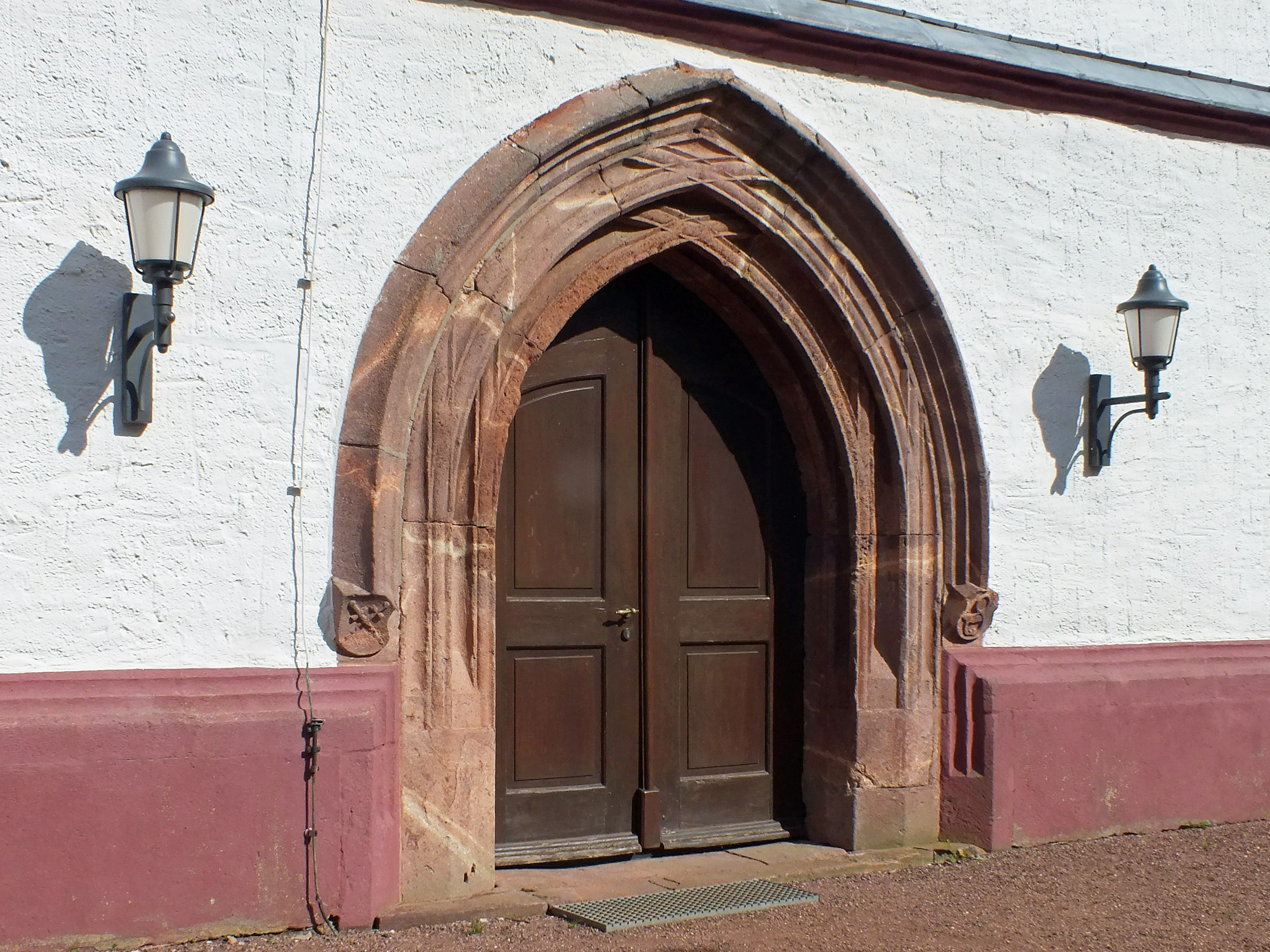
Gothic door frame

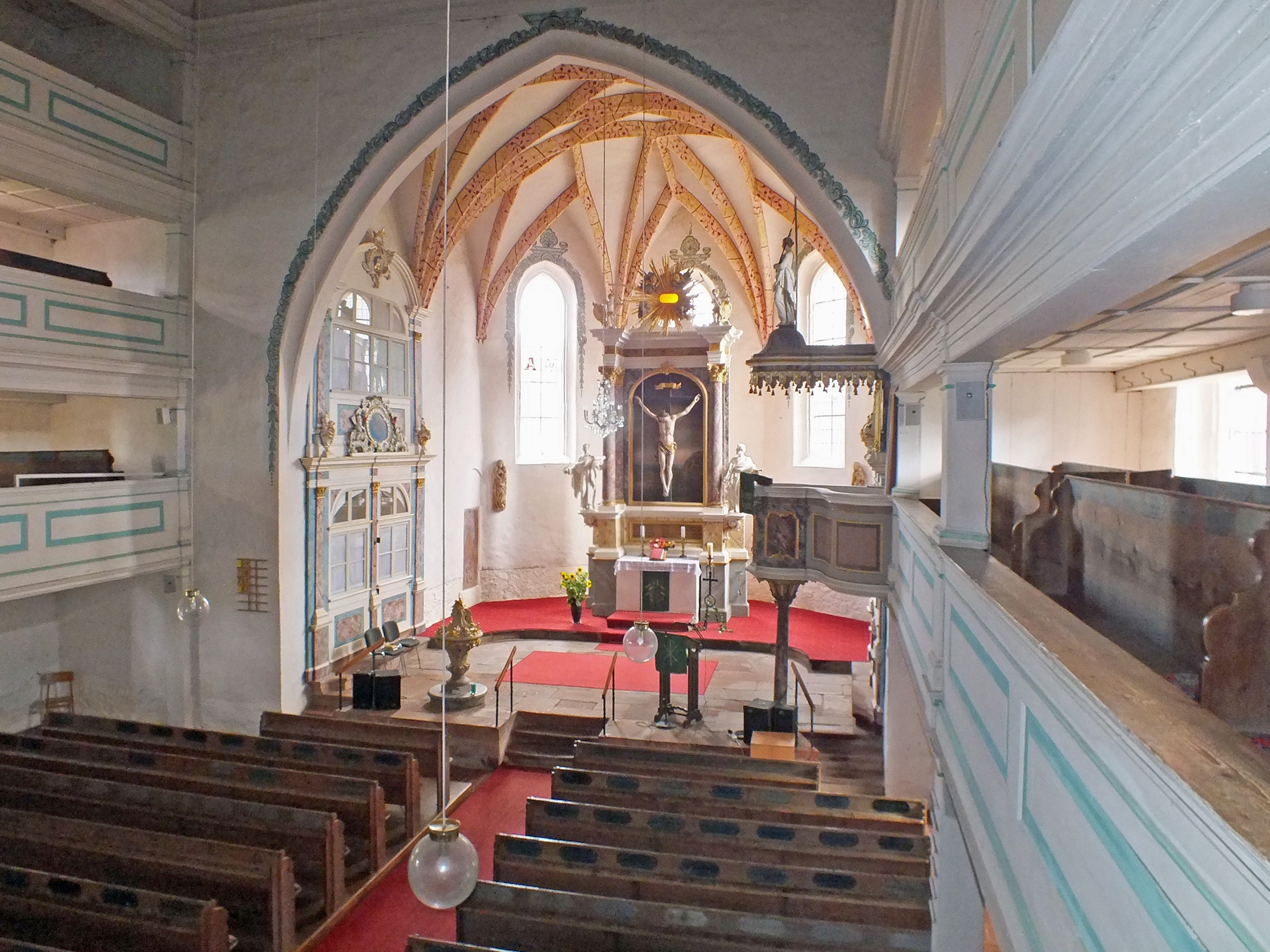
Interior view

== Municipal council ==
The communal elections in Saxony on 25 May 2014 resulted in the following distribution of seats in the municipal council:

- Bürgerbewegung Kirche (BBW): 8 seats (46.7% of votes)
- Bürgergemeinschaft FFw (BG FFw): 3 seats (21.2%)
- LINKE: 2 seats (17.1%)
- CDU: 1 seat (10.2%)
- SPD: no seat (4.7%)
- total: 14 seats

Voter turnout was 57.4%.

== Sights ==
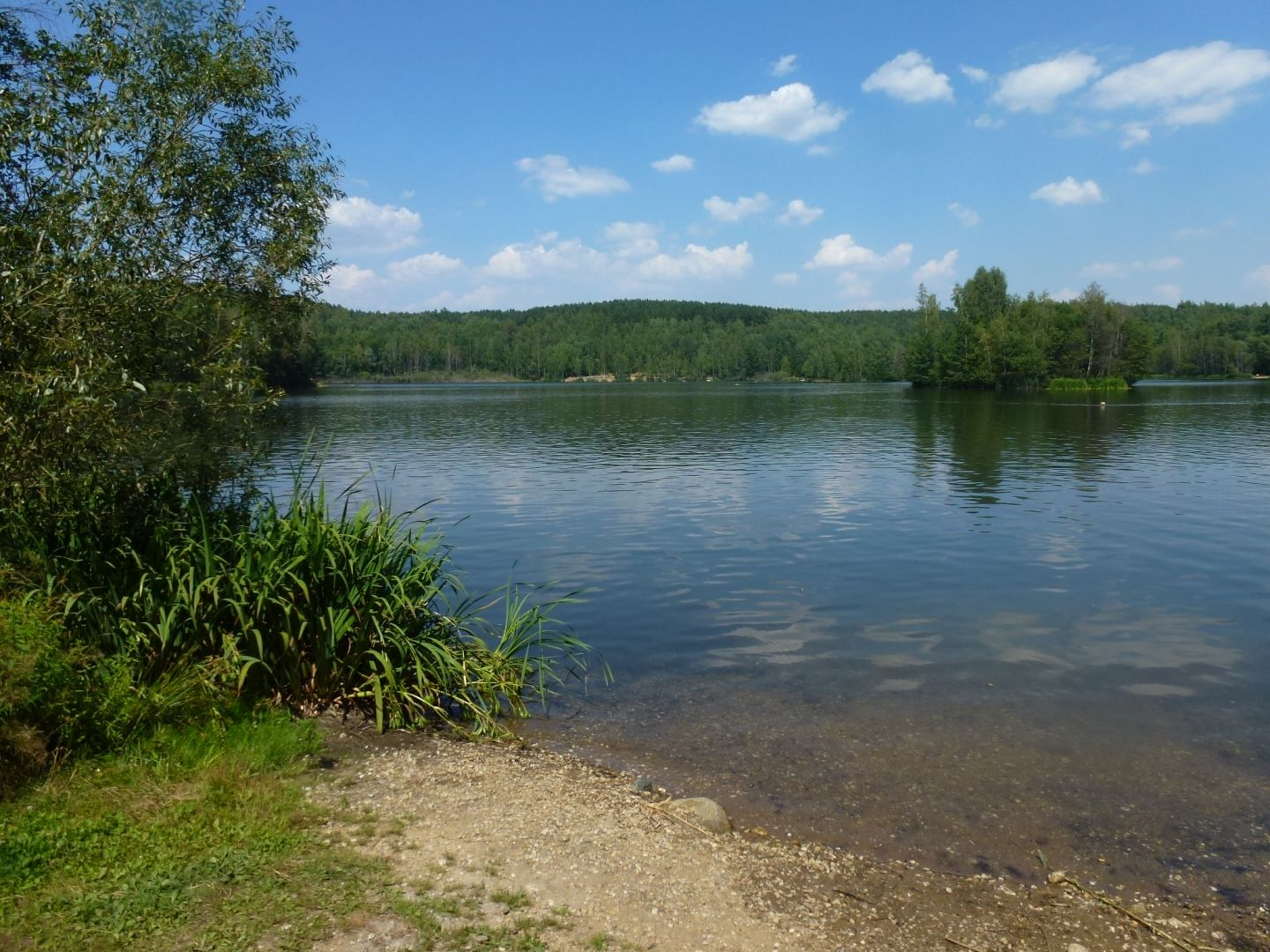
Biesern sand pit

- St. Anna church
- Rochlitzer Berg
- Valley of Zwickauer Mulde
- Fischheimer Borstel and Kötterner Porschel, Slavic burgwalls, built around the year 1000
- former sand pit Biesern: recreational water body for bathing and fishing

== Infrastructure ==
The eastern part of the communal area is crossed by Bundesstraße 107, the northern part by Bundesstraße 175 (section between Rochlitz and Geringswalde). The railway lines Glauchau–Großbothen and Waldheim–Rochlitz with stations in Steudten and Döhlen, respectively, have been closed down in 2002 and 1998. The official bicycle route Mulderadweg passes through Seelitz.

== Literature ==
- William Clemens Pfau: Grundzüge der älteren Geschichte des Dorfes Seelitz und seiner Kirche. Verlag Bode, 1902.
- Neue Sächsische Kirchengalerie. Band: Die Parochie Seelitz. Verlag Strauch, Leipzig 1909. (Digitalisat)
- Richard Steche: Seelitz. In: Beschreibende Darstellung der älteren Bau- und Kunstdenkmäler des Königreichs Sachsen, 14. Volume: Amtshauptmannschaft Rochlitz. C. C. Meinhold, Dresden, 1890, p. 90.
