= Lastau =

- Ortsteil of Colditz
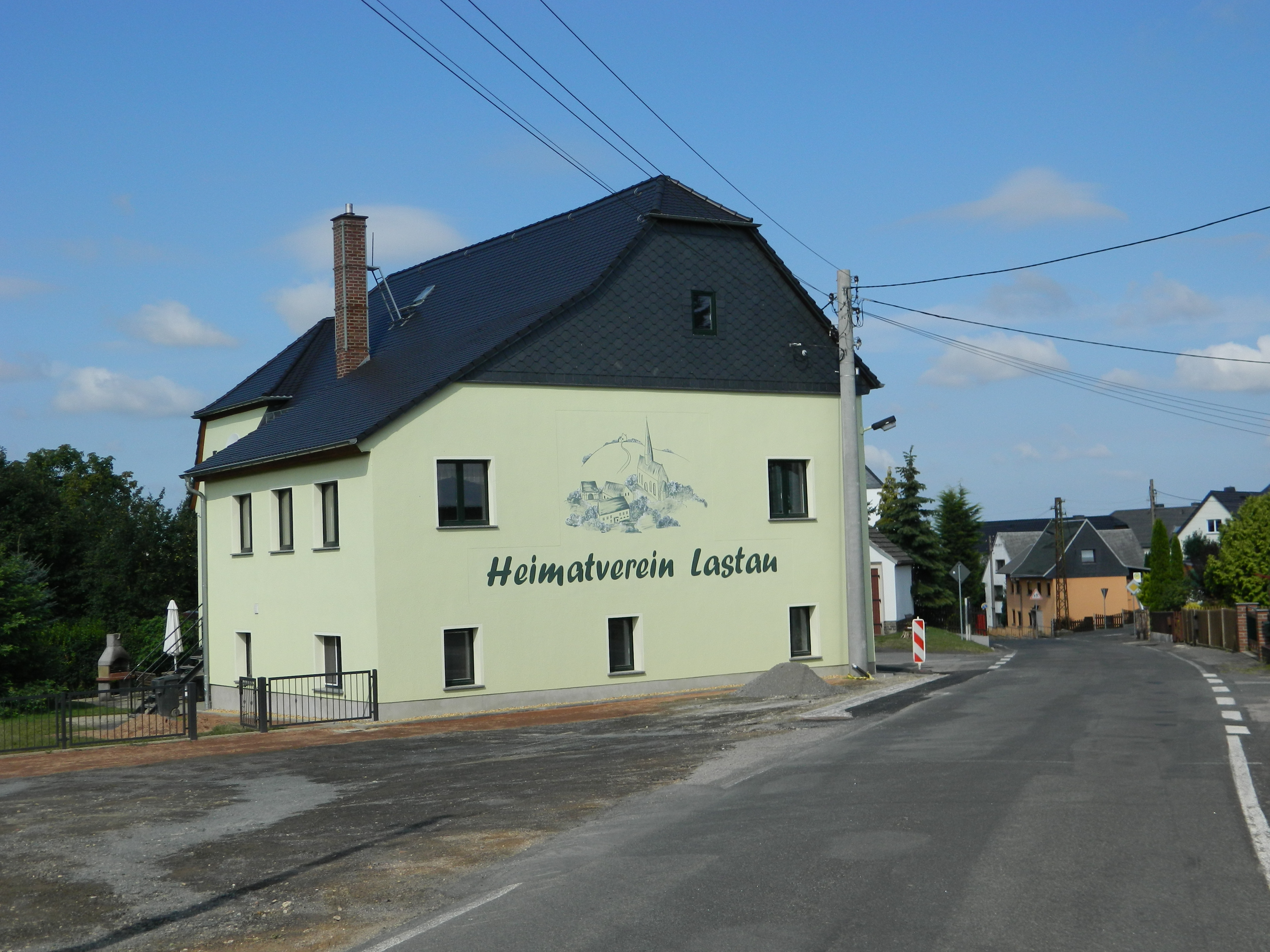
- Former inn in Lastau, now seat of the local history club

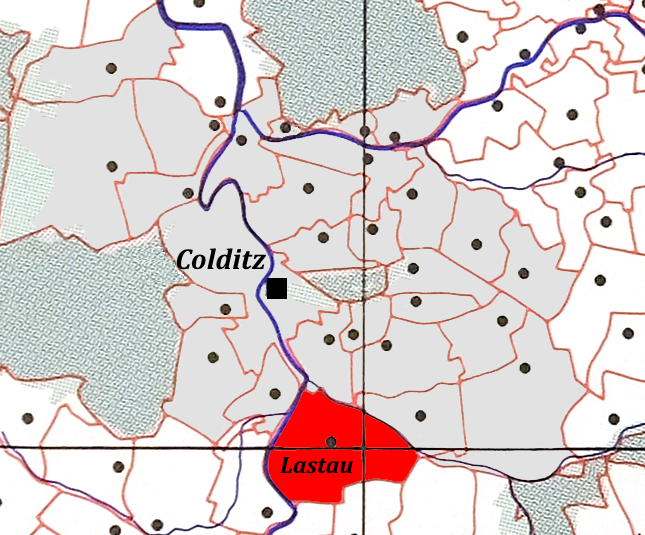
- Location of Lastau within Colditz
- Interactive map of Lastau
- Location within Germany Location within Saxony
- Coordinates: 51°6′5″N 12°49′15″E
- Country: Germany
- State: Saxony
- District: Landkreis Leipzig
- Town: Colditz
- Founded: 981

Area
  - Total: 4.13 km^{2} (1.59 sq mi)
- Elevation: 210 m (690 ft)
- Time zone: UTC+01:00 (CET)
  - Summer (DST): UTC+02:00 (CEST)
- Postal codes: 09306
- Dialling codes: 034381

Lastau is a village in Landkreis Leipzig, Saxony, Germany with approx. 222 inhabitants (2012). On 1 January 1994 it was incorporated into the town Colditz.

== Geography ==
Lastau is located south-east of Colditz on the right bank of Zwickauer Mulde and on the south bank of its tributary Auenbach. Only a small part named Aue including the former station actually lies in the valley and is subject to occasional flooding. The greater part of Lastau is situated several metres higher at the edge of the hilly forelands of the Ore mountains. Burgberg, a hill west of the village, rises to 224 m a.s.l.

== History ==
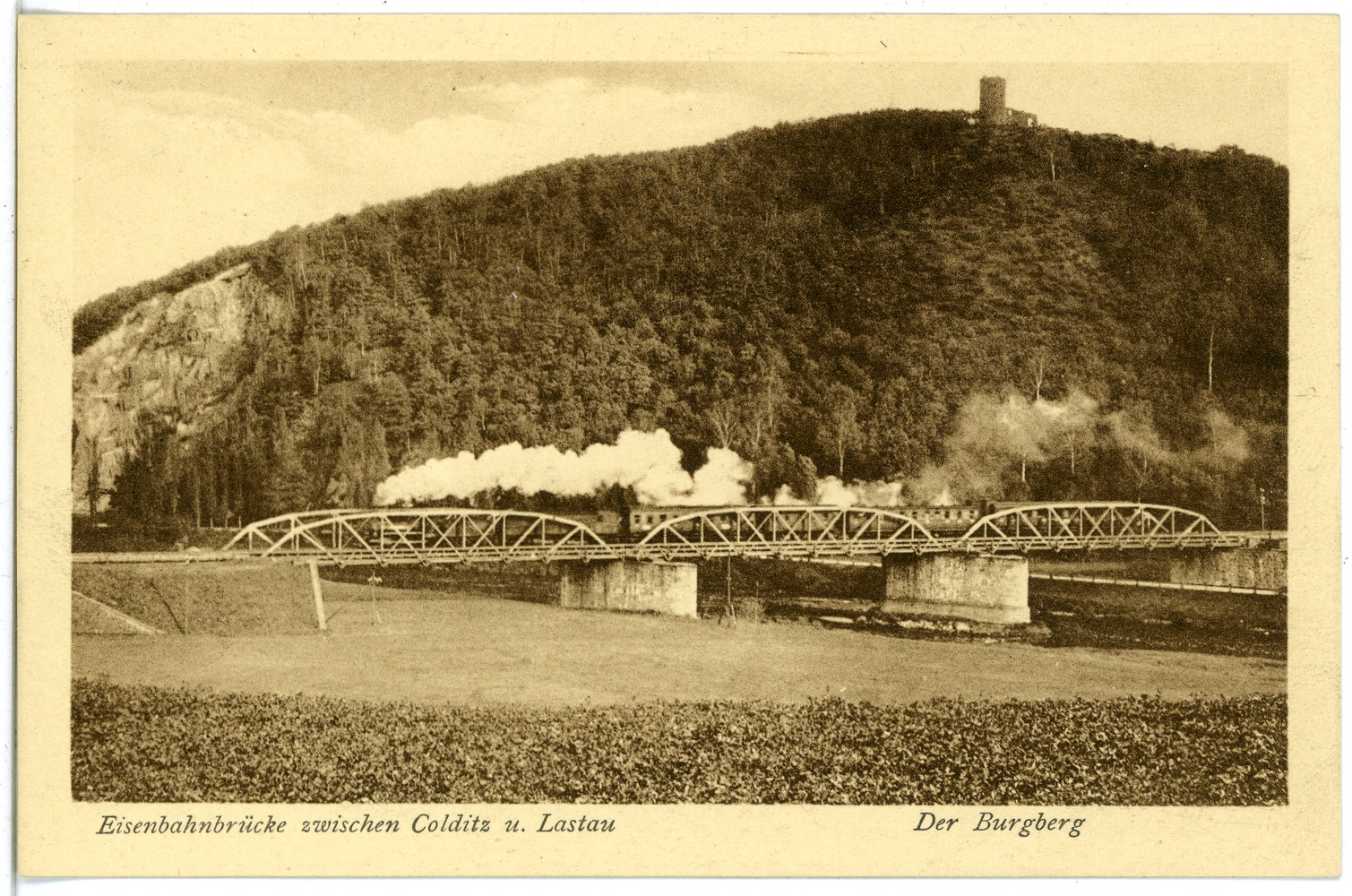
Burgberg and railway bridge near Lastau

Lastau was first mentioned as Lostatawa in Thietmar of Merseburg's chronicle of 981. In 1220 it passed into the hands of Margrave Dietrich the Oppressed and in 1221, after the family of the former owners gave up all rights to the village, to Buch Abbey near Leisnig. A contract dated 1265 gave permission to erect a water mill and stipulated that no further mill should be built between Lastau and Colditz. Margrave Frederick the Serious placed part of the possessions of the monastery under his protection, including Lastau which was then known as Lostowe. In 1378 the parishes of Lastau and Zettlitz were joined because of a lack of funds for the church of the latter. From then on until the Protestant Reformation Lastau was a filial church of Zettlitz. The village remained under the jurisdiction of the monastery in Buch.

In 1548 Lastau numbered 23 besessene Mann (land-owning farmers), owing allegiance to Kloster Buch which had by then been transferred into the hands of prince-elector Johann the Steadfast. The mill burned down in 1710, but was rebuilt.

An observation tower was erected on nearby Burgberg in 1888 on occasion of the 800-year jubilee of the House of Wettin. The tower was destroyed towards the end of World War II.

== Buildings ==
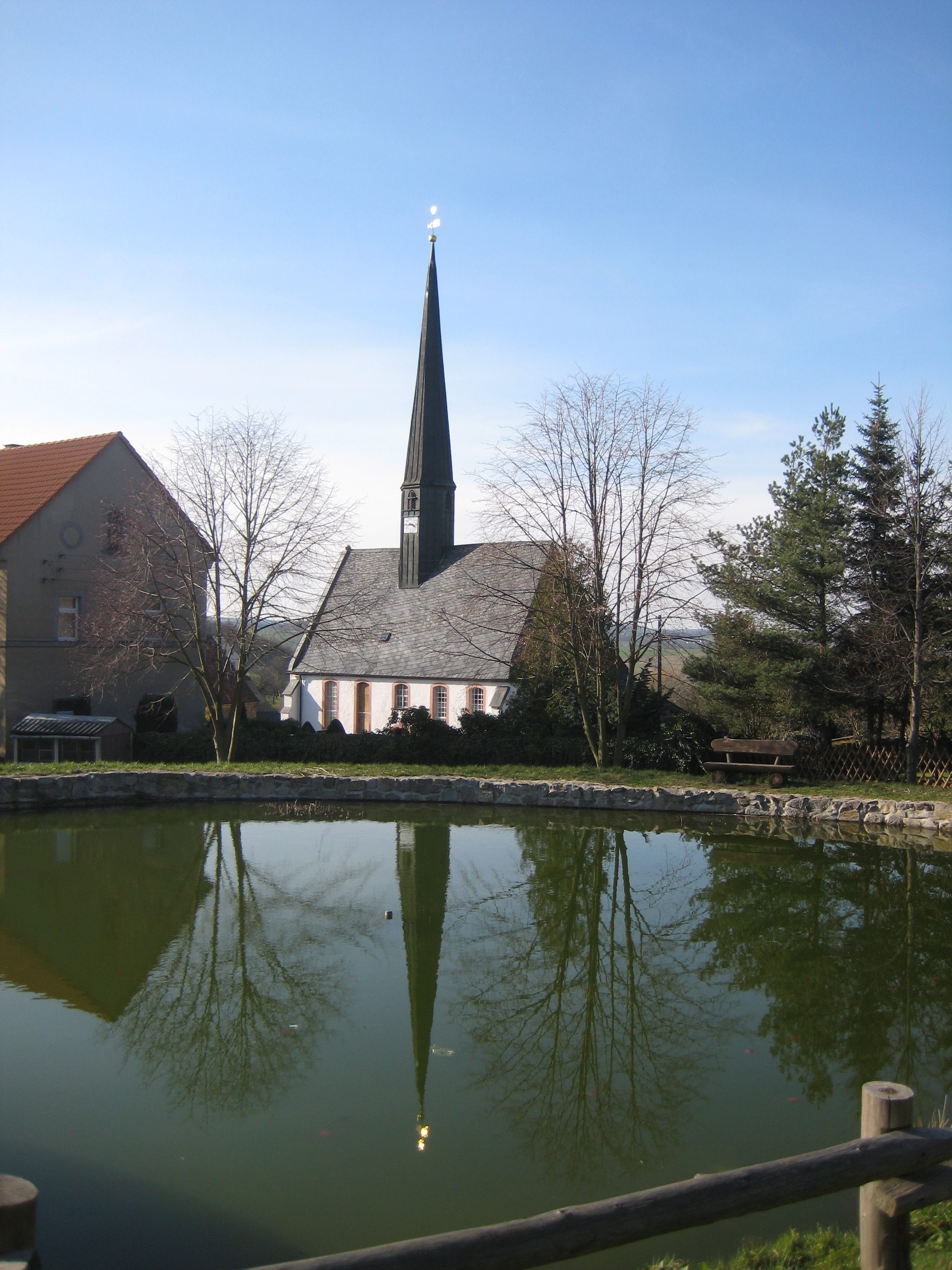
St. Mary's church

Notable buildings in Lastau are St. Mary's church, the restored "multi generation house", a former inn which is now the seat of the local history society, and the four-sided farmyard which now houses a restaurant and a guest house. Other four-sided farmsteads, typical for the area, are witnesses to the agricultural tradition of the village.

== Economy and transportation ==
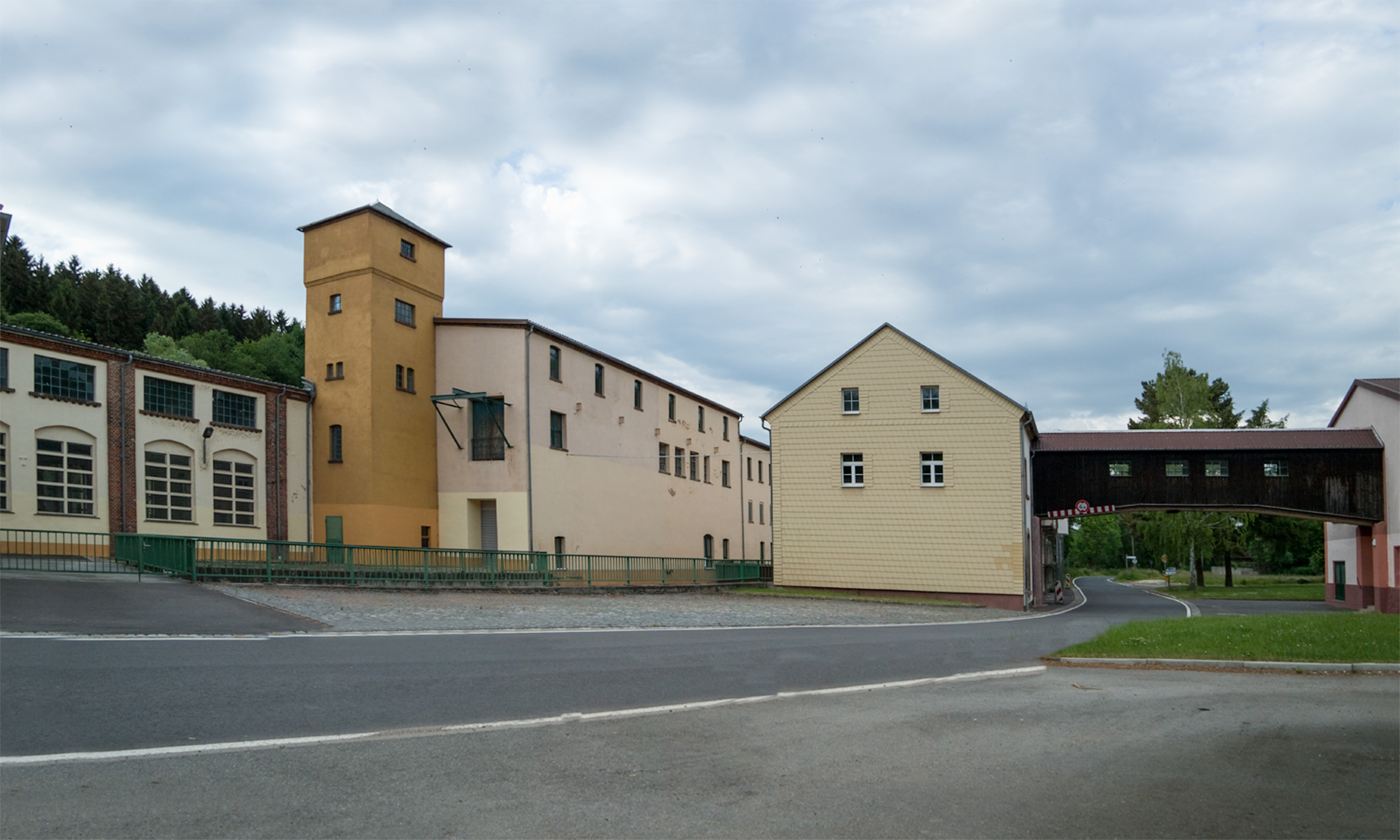
Former Lastau paper mill

The water mill on Zwickauer Mulde was transformed into a paper mill with a hydroelectric power station in the 19th century. The paper mill remained in operation until 1990, being a major producer of wallpaper in the 1950s and 1960s. The power station is still in use, a window manufacturer now uses the factory grounds and has transformed the former factory owners' villa into a hotel.

The main part of Lastau is situated on Kreisstraße 8292 which connects it with Colditz and Bundesstraße 175. The junction with the latter road is located near Hermsdorf and Aitzendorf. Aue lies on Kreisstraße 8291 between Colditz and Döhlen near Rochlitz. A minor road connects the two parts of the village. From 1875 until 1999 Lastau had a station on the Mulde valley railway which is currently out of operation. Public transport is provided by buses of Mitteldeutscher Verkehrsverbund, running daily between Grimma and Rochlitz.
