= Waldheim–Rochlitz railway =

Railway line in Germany

Waldheim–Rochlitz (Sachs)
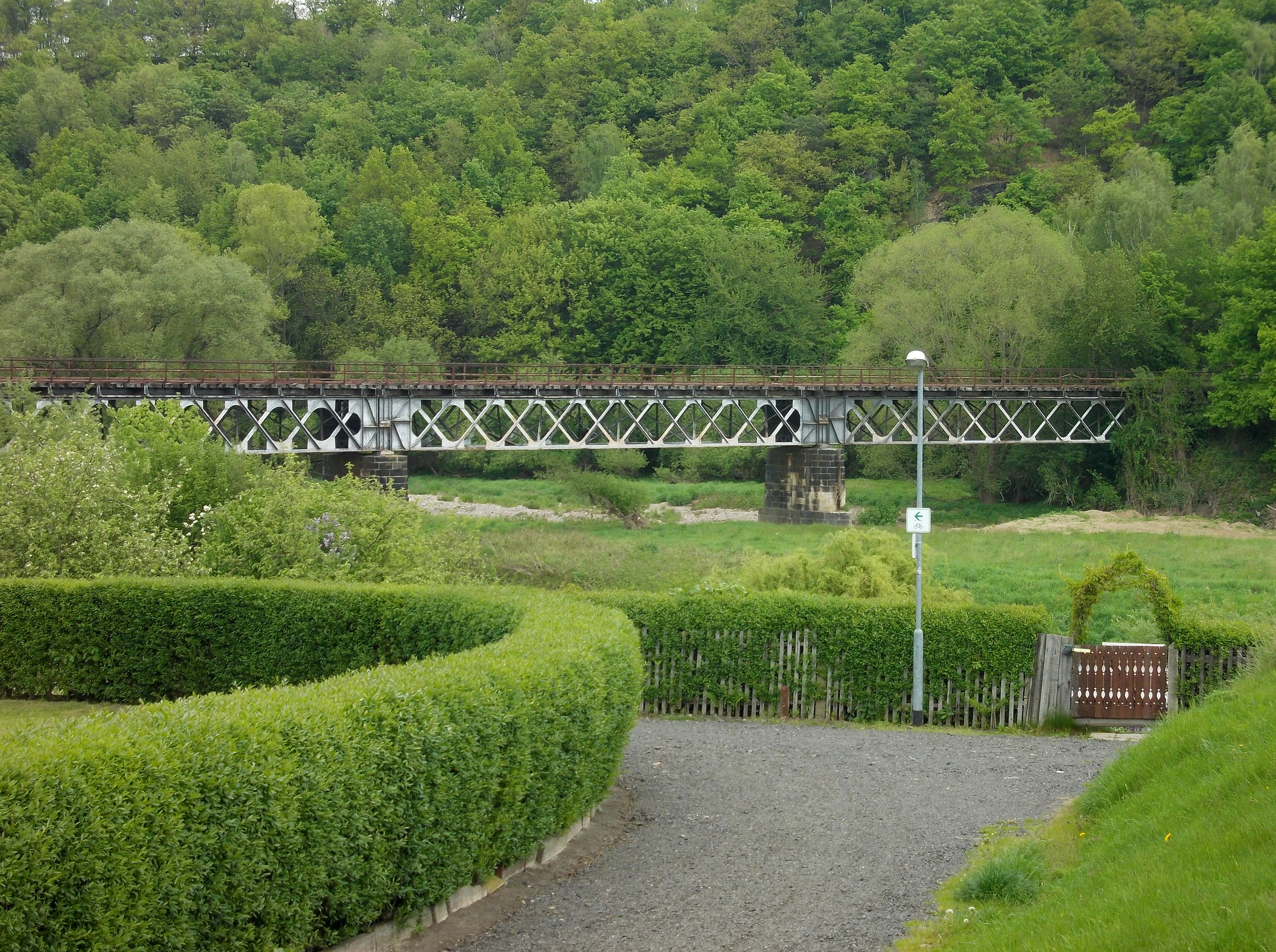
- Bridge across Zwickauer Mulde between Rochlitz and Döhlen

Overview
- Line number: 6631; WR

Service
- Route number: 528 (1997)

Technical
- Line length: 20.690 km
- Track gauge: 1435 mm
- Minimum radius: 210 m
- Maximum incline: 1.72 %

The Waldheim–Rochlitz railway was a single-track branchline of about 21 km length in Saxony, connecting the towns of Waldheim and Rochlitz via Hartha and Geringswalde. It was opened in 1893, closed in 1998 and served mainly the purposes of the local industry and population.

== History ==
=== Origins ===
First attempts to have a railway built between Waldheim and Rochlitz were made in the 1870s. The towns of Geringswalde and Hartha had a particular interest in it, as they expected advantages for their further economic development. A first petition to the Saxon parliament in 1871 was rejected by the First Chamber. Another petition in 1872, supported by Geringswalde, Hartha, Rochlitz, and Waldheim, was also rejected, and further attempts in the following years remained without success. Instead of the Waldheim–Rochlitz line, a railway from Schweikershain to Colditz via Geringswalde and Lastau and a branch line connecting Hartha to Waldheim were discussed in the 1870s.

While first rentability studies were permitted in 1882, the project was rejected again in 1883. In a new petition of 12 November 1883 the communities declared themselves ready to purchase the necessary land at their own expenses. In December 1883 the mayor of Geringswalde presented himself at ministries and railway deputations in Dresden. With a petition dated 7 November 1887 the towns of Geringswalde, Hartha, Rochlitz, and Waldheim complained to the Second Chamber of the Saxon Parliament about the slow progress.

Finally, preparatory work for a branch line was permitted in 1888 and began in 1889. Permission for the actual construction was given on 13 March 1890 by the Second Chamber of the Saxon Parliament, and shortly thereafter by the First Chamber. However, the exact route, in particular the location of Hartha station, had not been decided upon yet. A station close to the town center would have made the line about one kilometre longer, and would have required two more bridges, while a shorter, more southern route would have meant a greater distance of the station from the town. Despite the wishes of neighbouring communities, the supporters of the southern route prevailed. As a consequence, Geringswalde station was also built south of the town. Two options were considered for the route to Rochlitz, a northern one along Auenbach brook or a southern one along Aubach brook; due to the larger number of communities and the more favourable gradients along the latter, the southern route was selected.

=== Construction and opening ===
Construction started on 1 April 1891. Site offices were established in Waldheim and Rochlitz, their first tasks were surveying work, purchase of land, provision of materials, and hiring of workers. The groundbreaking ceremony was held on 27 October 1891 on the site of the bridge across Zwickauer Mulde, the largest engineering structure on the line. Substantial work, however, started only in June 1892. Part of Hausberg hill in Döhlen needed to be removed to make room for railway and road. The rock masses were used to raise the ground on the site of Döhlen station. Work in Geringswalde (where 96,000 m^{3} of earth had to be moved to level the ground for the station) and Hartha started in August 1892, and in Waldheim in November 1892. There, the expansion of the station in 1888, together with the removal of rock on its north-western edge, had created favourable conditions for further construction work.

Considering that only two major engineering structures needed to be built, the initial plan was to complete the line within a year. However, the deadline of 1 July 1893 could not be met, and tracklaying only started in August 1893. Although a first timetable was published for September 1893, the line was only completed in November 1893. The first engine reached Hartha on 6 October 1893. After two postponements, the line was opened with a delay of almost half a year on 6 December 1893 with a special train, the stagecoach route between Geringswalde and Rochlitz having ceased operation before. Upon opening, the line was given - as usual for Saxon railway lines - its route initials WR, derived from the initials of the termini.

=== Operation ===
Line number in timetable book	Dates
459	1914
145n	1939
170f	1941, 1941/42
170b	1944
433	1977, 1981/82
528	1997

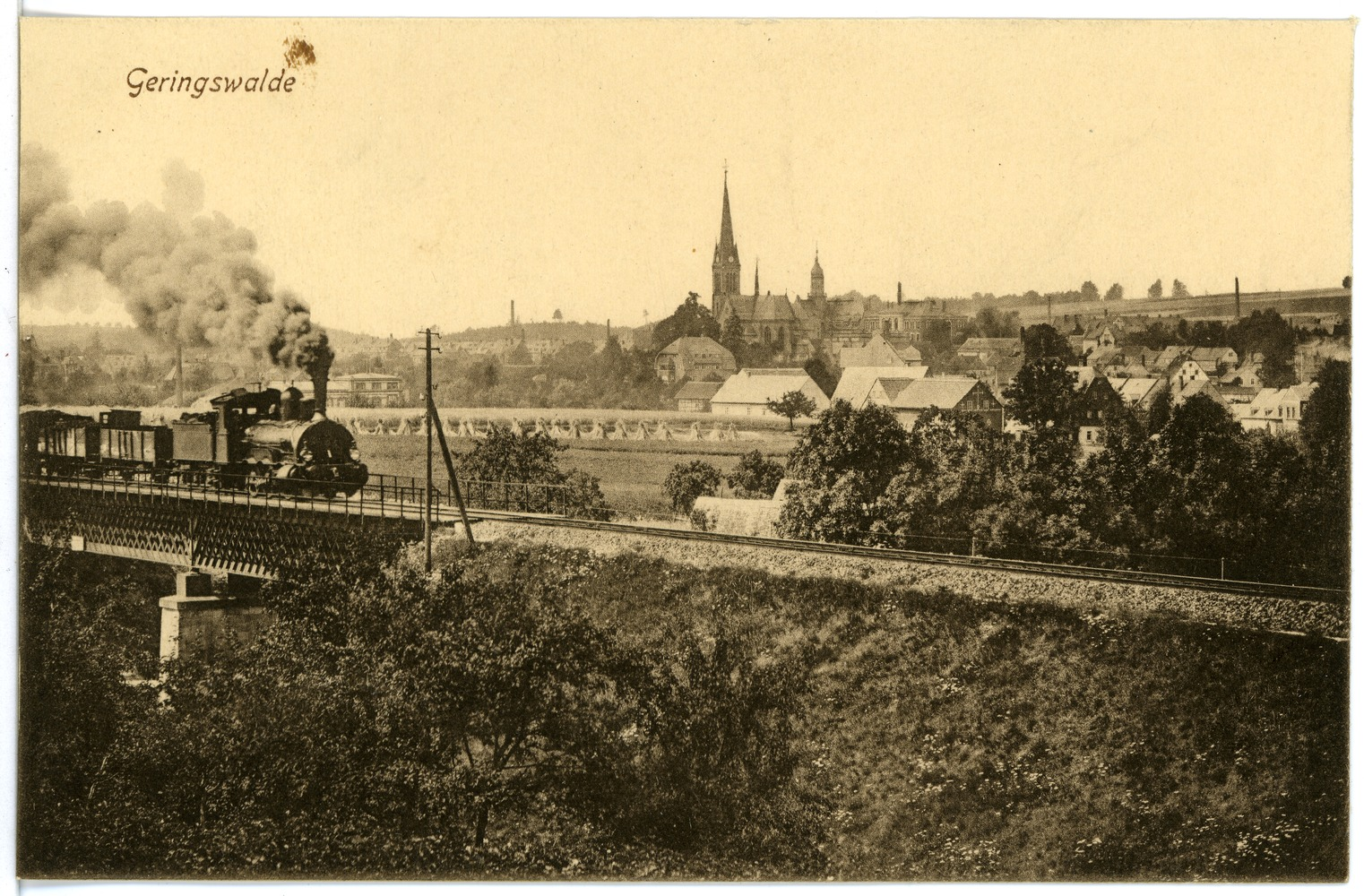
Freight train with Saxon V V locomotive on the Klosterbach bridge, 1913

The line catered mainly to local demand. The first timetable provided for four trains daily in each direction. In 1914 there were eight trains towards Waldheim and six towards Rochlitz on workdays, taking 60 to 70 minutes to travel the 21 km long line, and one train from Waldheim to Geringswalde. Before World War I there were also so-called "theatre trains" running through to and from Döbeln. The use of locomotives of Saxon Class V V has been recorded photographically. The traffic volume declined after World War I, for a limited period there was no passenger traffic on Sundays. Further disruptions were caused by a strike of railway workers in 1922. Traffic only stabilised in the late 1920s. At this time, the timetable arrangements were found unsatisfactory by the travelling public who requested through trains between Waldheim and Narsdorf as well as better connections, and considered the passenger rolling stock to be outdated. The travel time for passenger trains had remained between 60 and 70 min, and the number of trains had hardly changed (8 trains each way on workdays and one train from Waldheim to Geringswalde only).

On 26 September 1940 the bridge across the road between Arras and Milkau was exchanged for a new one with the help of a railway crane. The line did not suffer damage during World War II; unlike on other lines in the region, no bridges were destroyed by explosives.

Around 1980 there were three locomotive-hauled passenger trains each way between Waldheim and Rochlitz from Monday to Friday, needing about 40 min for one trip, and two locomotive-hauled passenger trains each way between Waldheim and Rochlitz, as well as two trains operated by diesel railcar each way between Waldheim and Altenburg. The morning train from Waldheim to Rochlitz continued from Monday to Friday to Narsdorf. Additionally, a mixed train ran from Monday to Saturday from Geringswalde to Rochlitz and back; a freight-only train was operated in its stead on Sundays. Typical locomotives at this time were classes 110 and 106, occasionally class 118 (six-axled) was used. Railcars were class 171/172.

Beginning in 1987, the section between Waldheim and Döhlen was overhauled and strengthened for an axle load of 21 t. This required the replacement of almost all bridges. The bridge across Klosterbach in Geringswalde was replaced by a temporary bridge with full load-bearing capacity, which was never replaced by a permanent one. Neither was the bridge across Zwickauer Mulde between Döhlen und Rochlitz renewed. These works were caused by the construction of a combined heat and power station in Döhlen, which was to serve the town of Rochltz, and which was to be supplied with lignite from surface mines in Lusatia. Railway troops and construction soldiers of Nationale Volksarmee were heavily involved. The line was fully closed to traffic for several months during summer 1988. However, the power station was not completed in the aftermath of the political changes of 1989/1990.

After 1989, the line quickly lost its importance in passenger and freight traffic. Due to increasing wear and tear and reduced maintenance, the travel time for the total distance increased to about one hour. Special trains ran on occasion of the country festival Tag der Sachsen 1995 in Rochlitz region, some of which continued via Waldheim to Riesa. For some years, through trains ran from Chemnitz via Waldheim, Rochlitz and Narsdorf back to Chemnitz (oder vice versa). Passenger traffic ceased on 1 June 1997 as a consequence of the sharp decline in ridership. Freight traffic had already stopped on 1 January 1996.

Eisenbahnbundesamt permitted the decommissioning of the line on 2 Juni 1998, it was officially carried out on 15 August 1998.

Deutsche Bahn offered in late 2011 to sell the grounds of the line in order to facilitate the construction of a bike path. The adjoining communities bought those sections of the line that lay on their territory. The dismantling of tracks and signalling equipment started in early 2012.

== Description of the line ==
The line branches off the Riesa–Chemnitz railway at the northern end of Waldheim station. At its southern end the line to Kriebethal branched off which has also been closed down in the 1990s.

The line to Rochlitz left Waldheim in a long curve in a north-western direction. After crossing under the Waldheim bypass road it passed Richzenhain and crossed the road between Waldheim and Hartha on a level crossing that was equipped with halfway gates in the last years of the operation. It continued to Hartha at a distance of about 50 m from State road S 36 and crossed another road (now K 7533) at the station entrance on a level crossing with full barriers.

From Hartha station at the southern edge of the town the line turned left in a southwestern direction and passed the forest Fröhne, where it traversed the watershed between Zschopau und Zwickauer Mulde. From there, the line descended steadily towards Rochlitz. Passing a pond (Fröhnteich) and the bridge across Klosterbach, it reached Geringswalde station, likewise situated at the southern edge of the town. Then the line turned southwards to Arras and after this station towards the south-west, crossing another forested area. After Obstmühle station the line continued westwards to Rochlitz. It passed through Döhlen whose station was situated at the western edge of the village, directly after the level crossing with Bundesstraße B175 (51.0507°N 12.8146°E). Although this crossing was protected by no less than six halfway gates in the later years of the line, accidents were common there. Turning left, and crossing Zwickauer Mulde on a curved bridge, the line reached Rochlitz station.

== Stations ==
Waldheim (51.0764°N 13.0139°E)

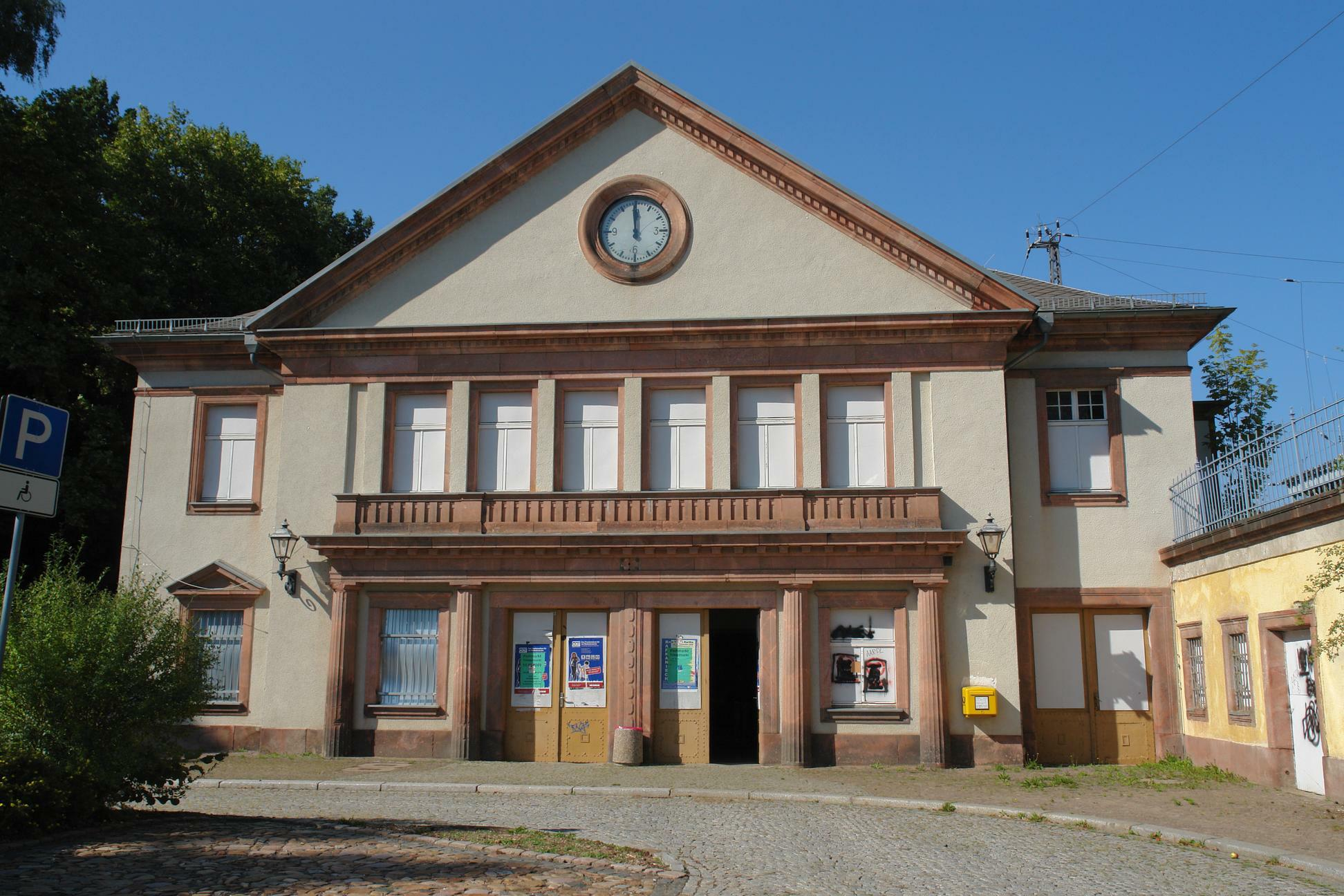
Front of Waldheim station building (2009)

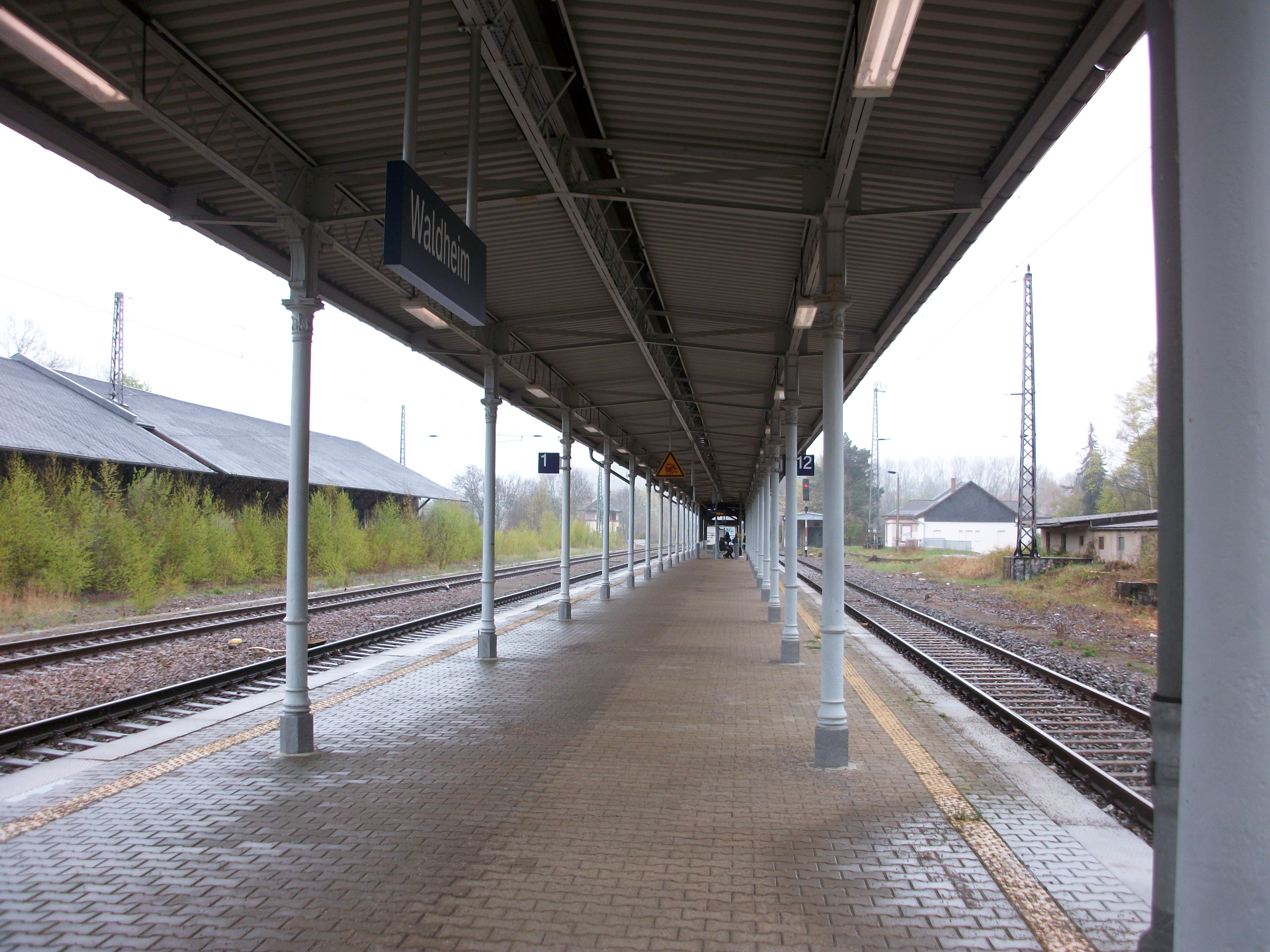
Platform in Waldheim (2016). Trains to Rochlitz used to leave from the right-hand track

Waldheim station was opened in 1852 when the line between Limmritz and Chemnitz, the last section of the Riesa–Chemnitz railway, was opened. Despite the fact that two branch lines — the Waldheim–Rochlitz railway and the Waldheim–Kriebethal railway which was opened 1896 - joined the mainline here, the track plan of this junction station remained comparatively simple. In the last years of the line there was only one track with a run-around loop for the locomotives of the Rochlitz trains. They used the island platform which at this time had remained the only platform in the station (a second platform without a canopy had been removed when the mainline was re-doubled and electrified). The opposite side of the island platform was and still is used by the mainline trains between Riesa and Chemnitz. With the building work progressing, the Rochlitz track was joined to the mainline, too, but is hardly used any more. The station building had stood empty and suffered from increasing decay for several years until most of it was demolished in 2015, leaving only the porticus. The long goods shed and the engine shed that was accessible via a turntable are also abandoned and decaying. The engine shed used to house locomotives for shunting duties and for the freight services to the paper mills in the Zschopau valley. Some team tracks have remained in use for a few years after closure of the WR line, but now (2016) only a passing loop and two crossovers between the mainline tracks are left beside the latter.

Hartha (Kr Döbeln) (51.0905°N 12.9727°E)

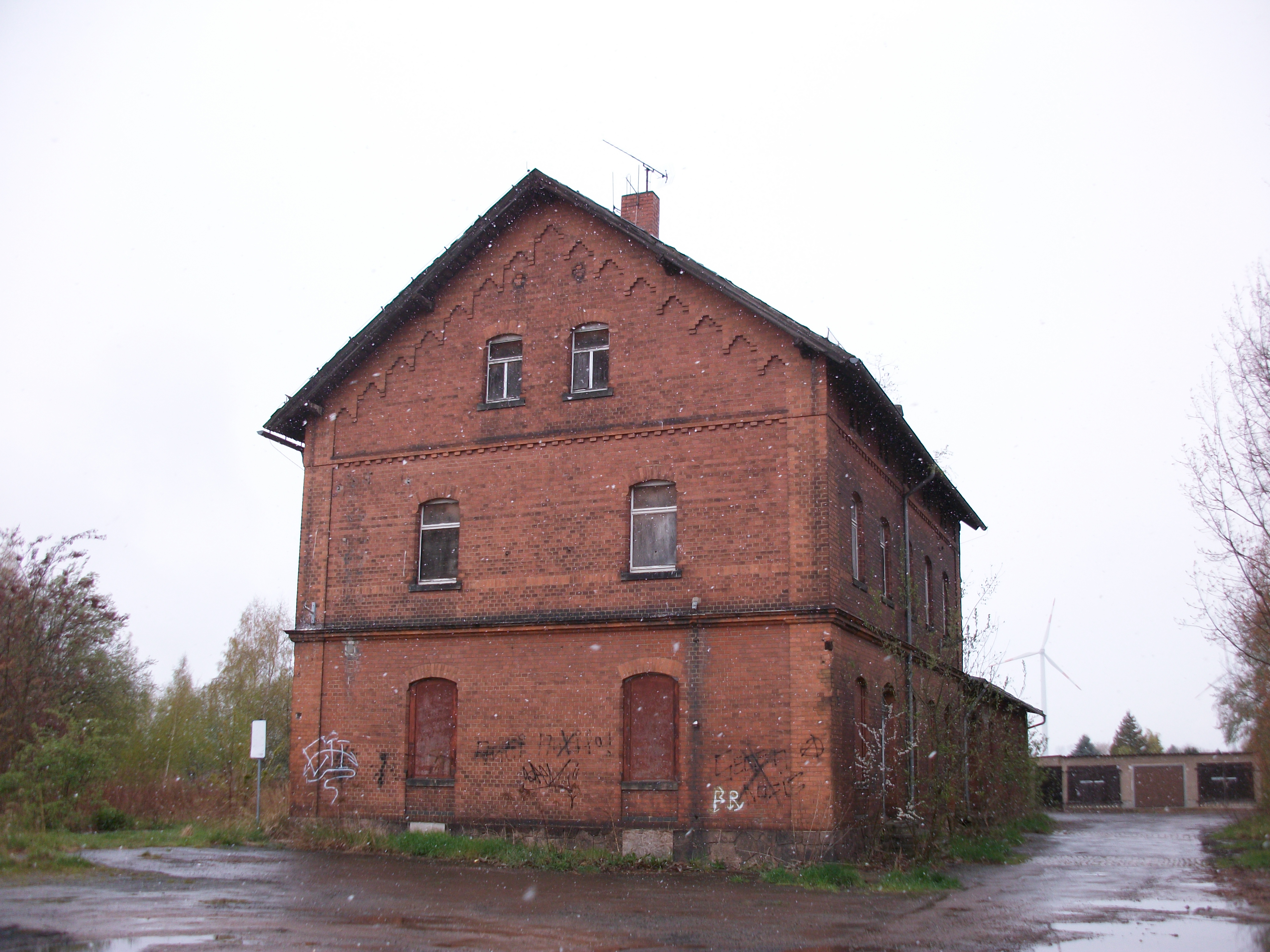
Hartha station building (2016)

After Geringswalde, Hartha was the second most important intermediate station on the line. It had two passenger platforms to enable occasional train crossings. It was more important for freight traffic, as there were four sidings serving the local industry, three of which remained in operation until shortly before the closing of the line. Main customers were the agricultural co-operative warehouse and the textile industry. The following buildings existed: a station building with two and a half stories (Saxon standard design, built in brick), a goods shed, a non-residential and a residential building and a loading dock. In order to cope with the increasing shunting demands, a new Kö I with Number 0236, built by Windhoff, based in Riesa depot, was stationed here at least until 1945.

The name of the station changed over time:

- until 30 September 1904: Hartha bei Waldheim
- until 30 June 1911: Hartha (Stadt)
- until 3 Oktober 1953: Hartha Stadt
- since 4. Oktober 1953: Hartha (Kr Döbeln)

Geringswalde (51.0726°N 12.9077°E)

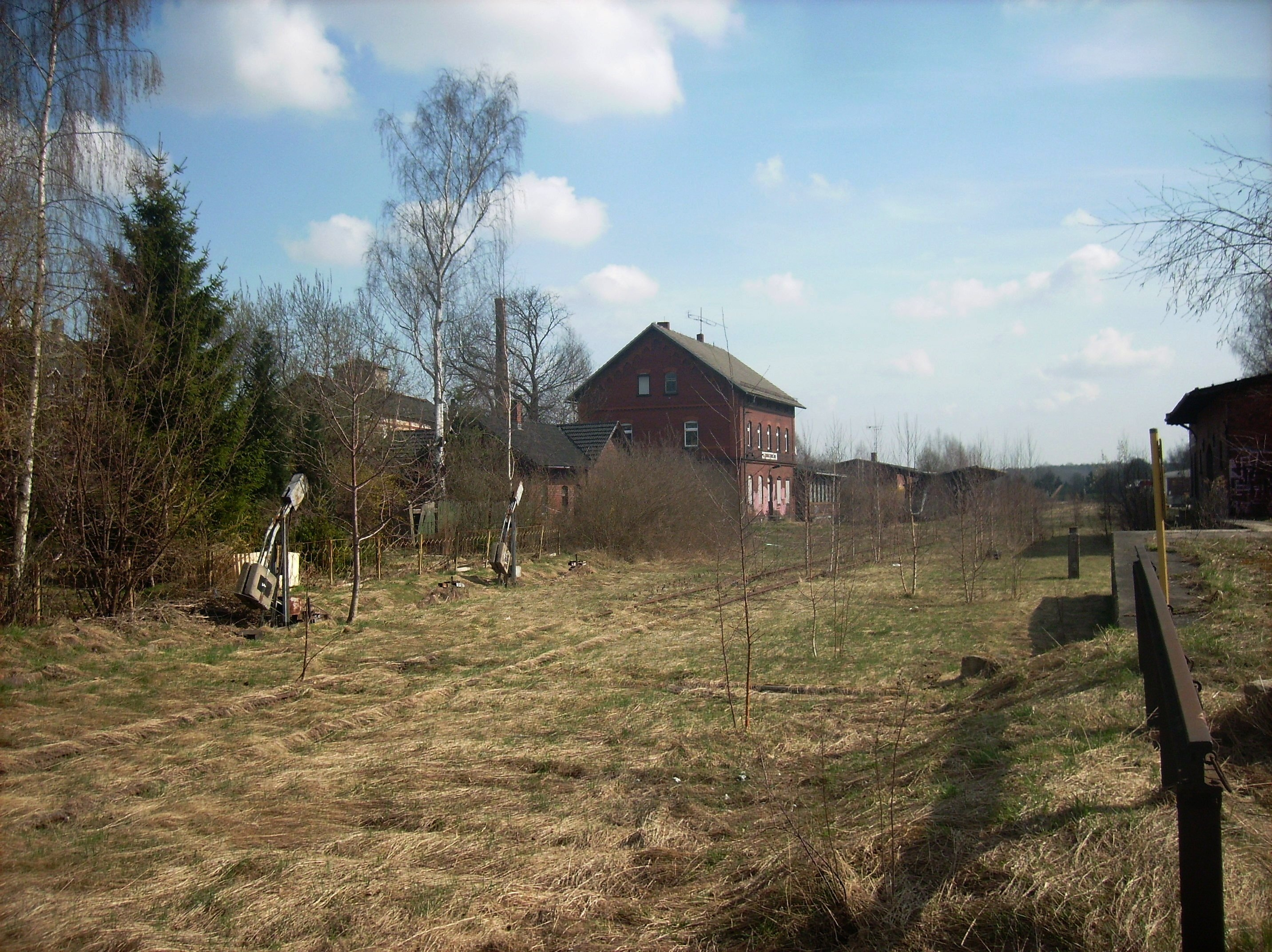
Station area Geringswalde (2011)

The station had an island platform where trains could cross and which could be accessed from the station building through a pedestrian tunnel. The ticket barrier at the tunnel entrance was last used in the 1970s. The station building was of the same type as that in Hartha, but had been extended by a spacious waiting room, whose eastern interior wall was decorated with a mural with railway motives.

After the first goods shed on the southern side of the station proved too small, a second, larger one was built on the northern side. A small shunting engine was stationed in Geringswalde in the 1930s, too. After World War II two tracks were removed as war reparations.

Freight customers were the local industry and the agricultural warehouse. The latter had its own siding. Another siding served a toolmaking factory and linked the animal fodder mill to the railway network via an asymmetric turntable. Level crossings were situated at both ends of the station. The eastern one had been kept closed for vehicles since the mid-1970s, and could only be used by pedestrians. When the line was upgraded to carry higher axle loads in the 1980s, a work train with accommodations for the workers was stationed in Geringswalde.

Arras (51.0558°N 12.9015°E)

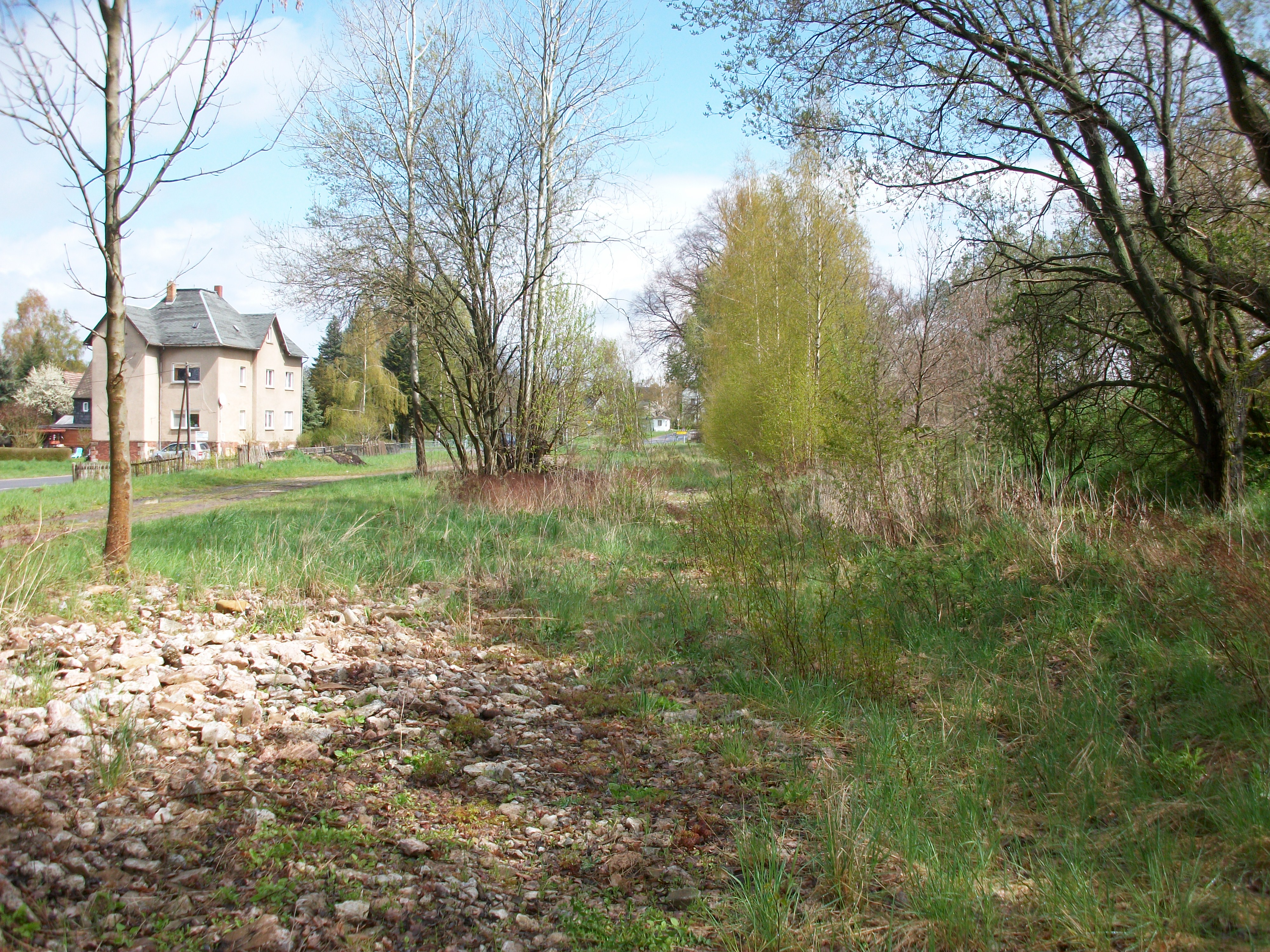
Former station Arras (2016)

Until the end of World War II there was a private siding at Arras halt. The waiting room was paved with wood.

Obstmühle (51.0423°N 12.8639°E

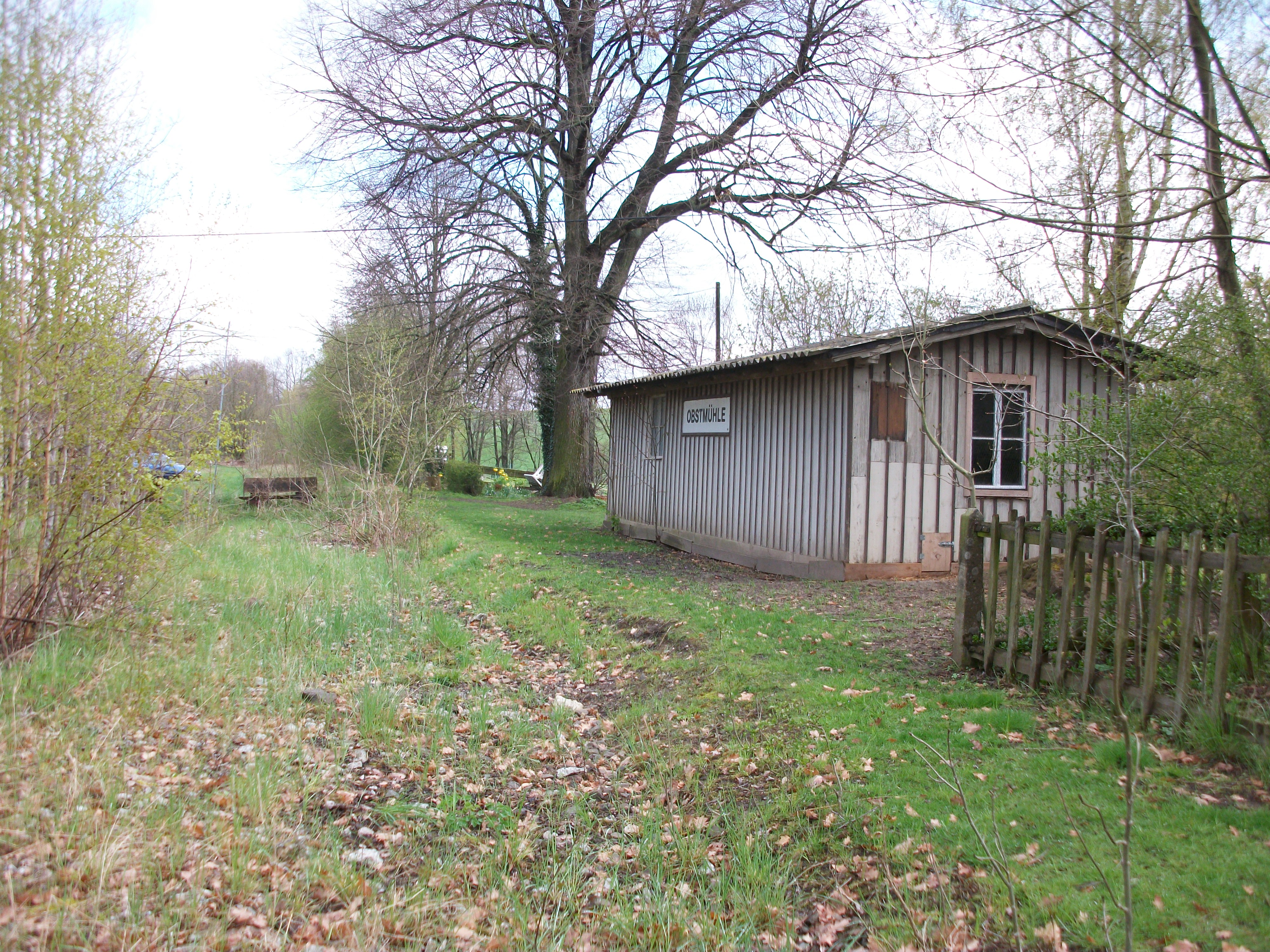
Former station Obstmühle (2016)

This station once had an extra team track that also served a loading dock. After its removal, the station became a mere halt. Next to the waiting room with a wooden floor stood the body of a covered goods wagon of type Stettin which was used as a storage room.

Döhlen (b Rochlitz/Sachs) (51.0511°N 12.8136°E)

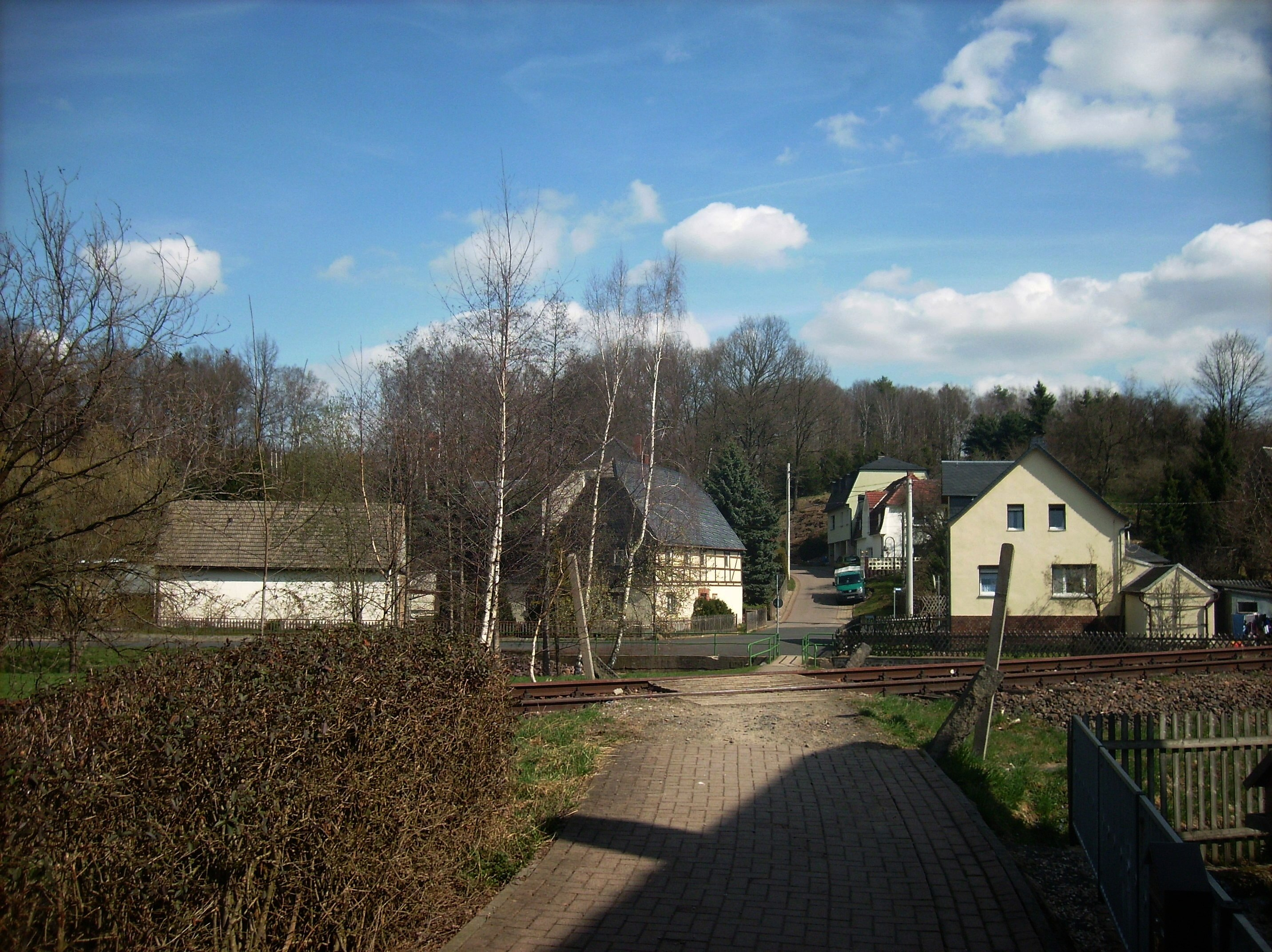
Level crossing in Döhlen village, between Döhlen and Obstmühle stations

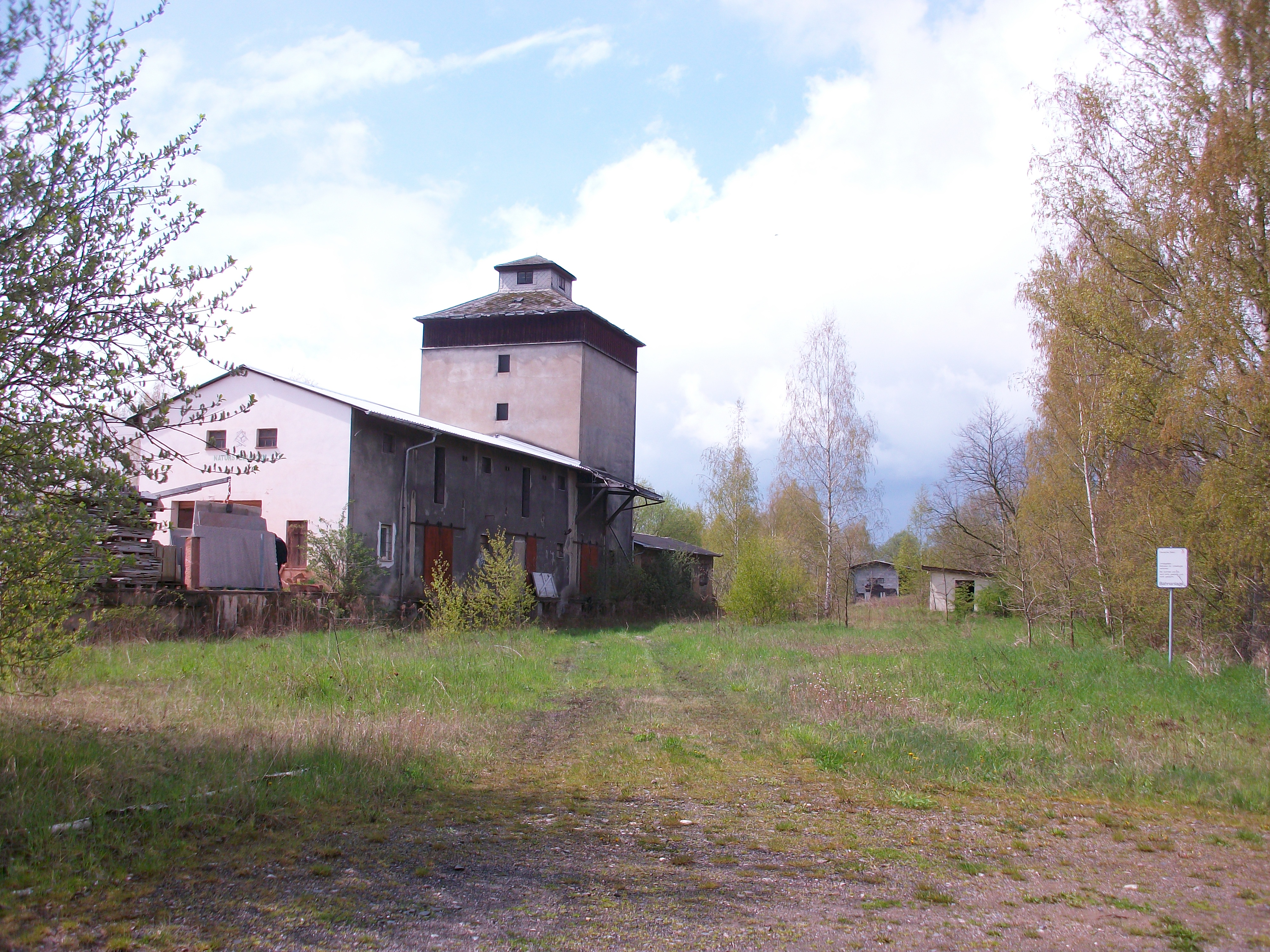
Former station Döhlen (2016)

Döhlen halt (with a masonry-built waiting room) kept its team track until the closure of the line. Freight traffic originated from the local branch of VEB Orsta-Hydraulik Rochlitz and from agriculture.

Rochlitz (Sachs) (51.056462°N 12.79403°E)

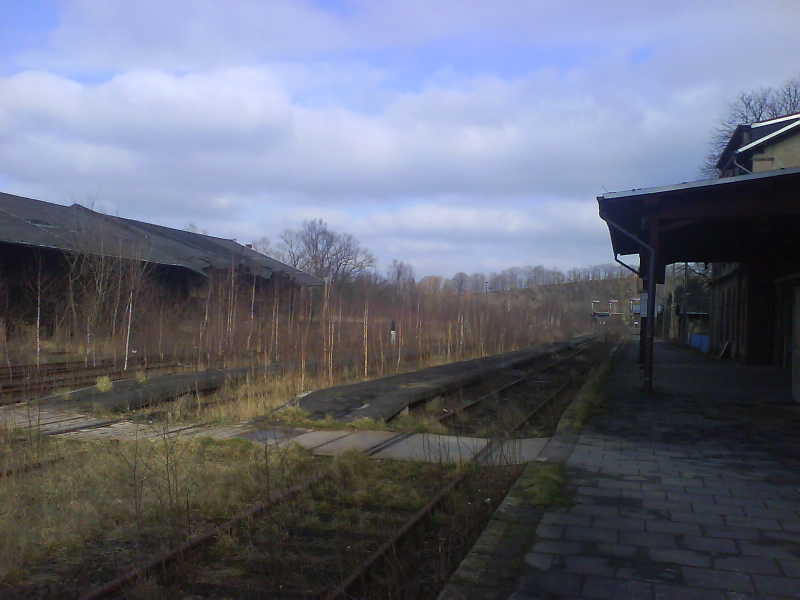
Rochlitz station (2007)

Rochlitz station opened in 1872 together with the Rochlitz–Penig railway. The Rochlitz–Großbothen section of Glauchau–Wurzen railway ("Muldentalbahn") opened in 1875 and was extended to Penig in 1876 and to Glauchau in 1877, making Rochlitz an interchange station. A motive power depot developed from supply facilities for locomotives. Aside from trains from Waldheim, from 1902 on also trains from Chemnitz via Wechselburg reached Rochlitz.

The decades following the opening of the railway lines saw lively traffic. Much of the freight originated from sandpits in the Mulde valley and from the paper and textile industry. Passenger traffic mainly served commuters. After having been extended several times until 1900, the station layout remained almost unchanged until 1990. Traffic volume decreased sharply as an economic consequence of the political changes of 1989/1990, and by 2001 all railway traffic around Rochlitz had ceased.

== Major engineering structures ==
The parts of the original bridges on the Waldheim–Rochlitz line were supplied by the foundry Lauchhammerwerk.

Muldenbrücke (51.05912°N 12.79785°E)

Construction of this lattice truss bridge started on 27 October 1891 and finished in March 1893. It is situated in a curve. It is 111 m long and 11 m high. Its weight was 5000 Zentner (250 t). Two masonry piers support the bridge between its abutments. The replacement, planned for between 1991 and 1995, was not carried out following the German reunification, even though wear and tear required restrictions of the permitted axleload to 16 t, and the maximum velocity to 10 km/h.

Klosterbachbrücke (51.07276°N 12.91630°E)

The lattice truss bridge between Geringswalde and Klostergeringswalde had a length of 96 m and a height of 9 m, and was thus the second largest engineering structure on the line. On occasion of the upgrade of the line in 1988 it was replaced by a temporary structure. Replacement of the abutments and construction of a new bridge, planned for between 1991 and 1995, were not carried out.
