= Döhlen (Seelitz) =

- Ortsteil of Seelitz
- Interactive map of Döhlen
- Location within Germany Location within Saxony
- Coordinates: 51.051°N 12.829°E
- Country: Germany
- State: Saxony
- District: Mittelsachsen
- Municipality: Seelitz

Area
  - Total: 1.85 km^{2} (0.71 sq mi)
- Time zone: UTC+01:00 (CET)
  - Summer (DST): UTC+02:00 (CEST)
- Postal codes: 09306
- Dialling codes: 03737
- Vehicle registration: FG, BED, DL, FLÖ, HC, MW, RL

Döhlen is a village in Landkreis Mittelsachsen in the Free State of Saxony, Germany. It is part of the municipality of Seelitz.

== Geography ==
Döhlen is situated in the valley of Aubach brook, about 2 km east of Rochlitz in the Saxon Loess country. The lowest point is at the bridge of Bundesstraße 175 across Aubach at about 160 m a.s.l. The terrain rises above 200 m a.s.l. to the north and the south of the village, reaching 229 m on Gölprigberg near Köttern and 227 m on Eselsberg near Gröblitz, both outside Döhlen.

The village, originally an irregular manor settlement with block-shaped land parcels, forms a contiguous settlement with Neutaubenheim, a former manor east of it. Neighbouring villages are Köttern in the north, Neuwerder in the northeast, Sachsendorf in the east, Gröblitz in the south, and Stöbnig in the west. The hamlet of Neudörfchen is situated between Döhlen and Köttern. Bundesstraße 175 passes through the western part of the village, climbing out of the valley of Zwickauer Mulde on a steep ramp around Kiefernberg hill.

== History ==
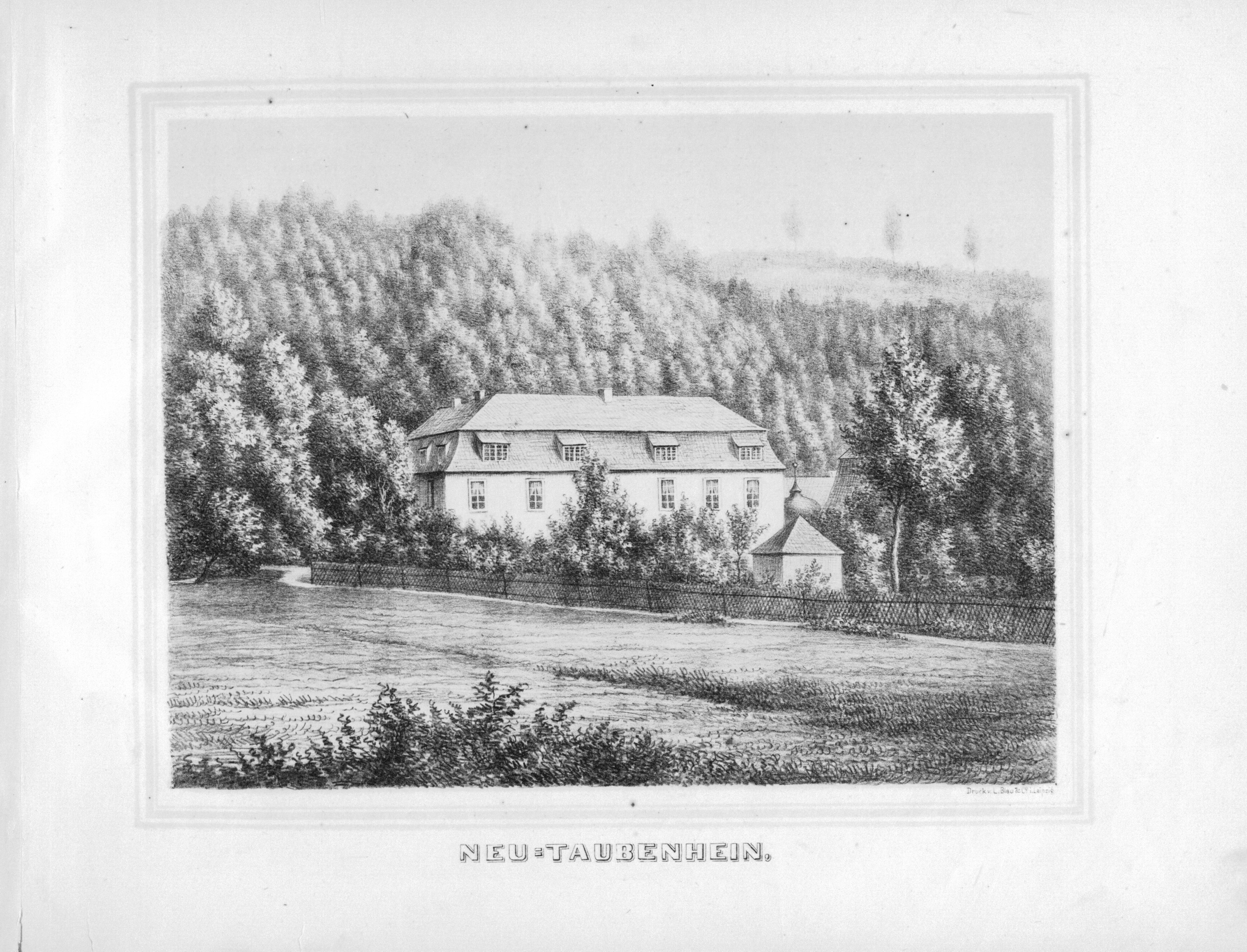
Neutaubenheim manor house in 1860

Döhlen has been recorded since 1350, initially under the name Dalen which changed through Doelenn and Doelen to the modern spelling. The manor of Döhlen-Neutaubenheim has been known since the mid-15th century. It has been known as Neutaubenheim since the second half of the 16th century and was dissolved in the 1945 land reform. The manor house was demolished, the outbuildings have been preserved.

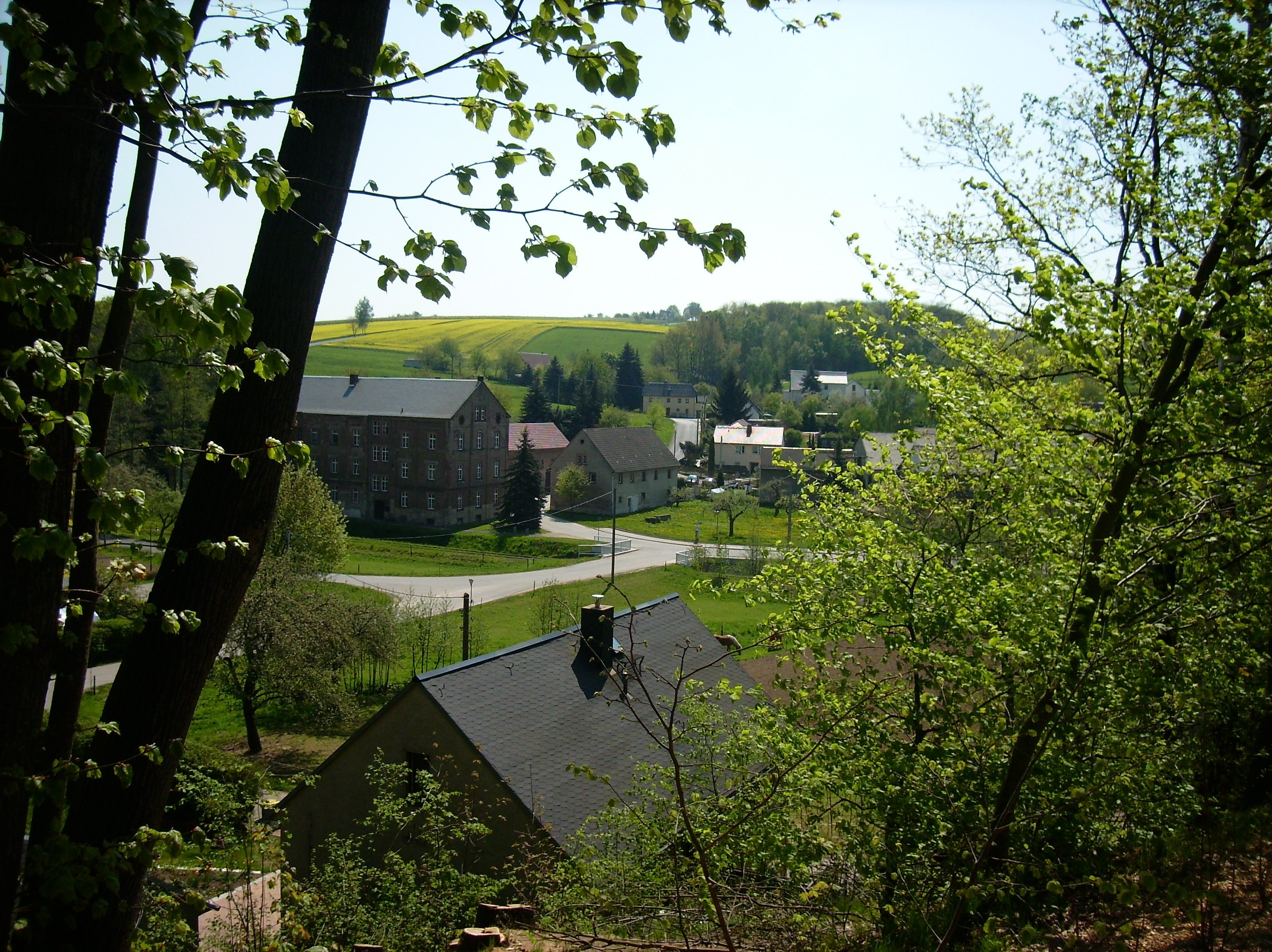
View across the village

In 1378 Döhlen was mentioned as being under the control of the castle of Rochlitz, and while the manor exercised the local administration, it and the village formed part of Amt Rochlitz and its successors. In 1952, Döhlen became part of Kreis Rochlitz in Karl-Marx-Stadt district. In 1969, Döhlen with Neutaubenheim was incorporated into the municipality of Seelitz. With Kreis Rochlitz, it passes in 1994 into Landkreis Mittweida and in 2008 into Landkreis Mittelsachsen.

In 1893, the Waldheim–Rochlitz railway line was opened with a station (a halt with a team track and a loading stage) at the western edge of Döhlen, on the border to neighbouring Stöbnig. Construction of the line required the removal of part of Hausberg hill to make room for the road which had to be relocated. This line was closed to freight in 1996, to passengers in 1997, and decommissioned in 1998.

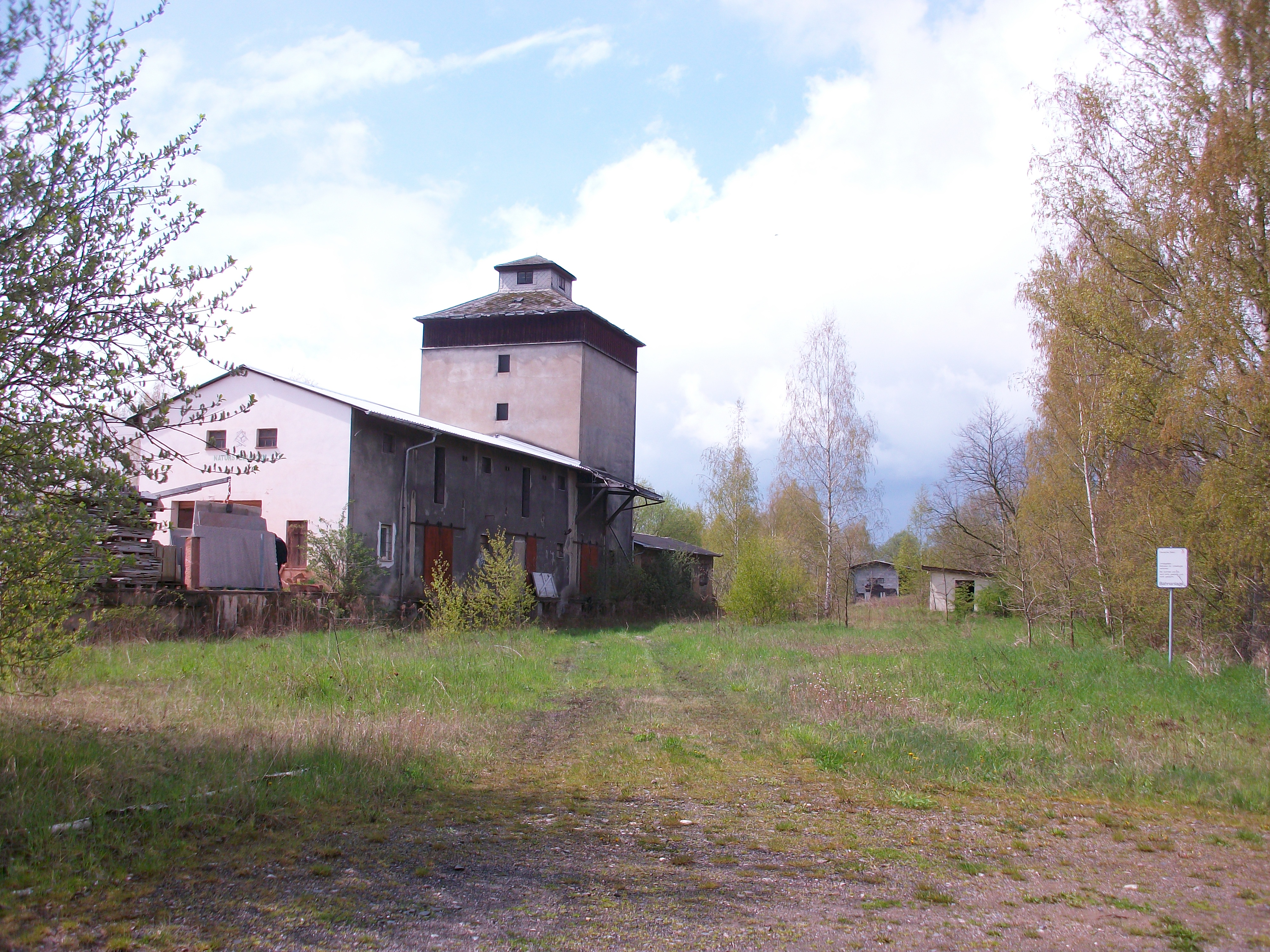
Former railway station

A schoolhouse was built in 1817. It was used until 1897 when a larger one was opened, and turned into a tailor's workshop. The primary school in the new schoolhouse closed in the early 1970s, and the building was transformed into a kindergarten in 1981. Since 2008, the latter has been administered by a foundation of the Evangelical-Lutheran Church of Saxony.

== Economy ==
Döhlen is characterised by agriculture. The main enterprises are a large fruit farm (Obstgut Seelitz), a fur farm, and a builders' merchant. Public transport is provided by buses to Rochlitz, Geithain, Grimma, and Waldheim.
