= Rochlitz–Penig railway =

Railway line in Saxony, Germany

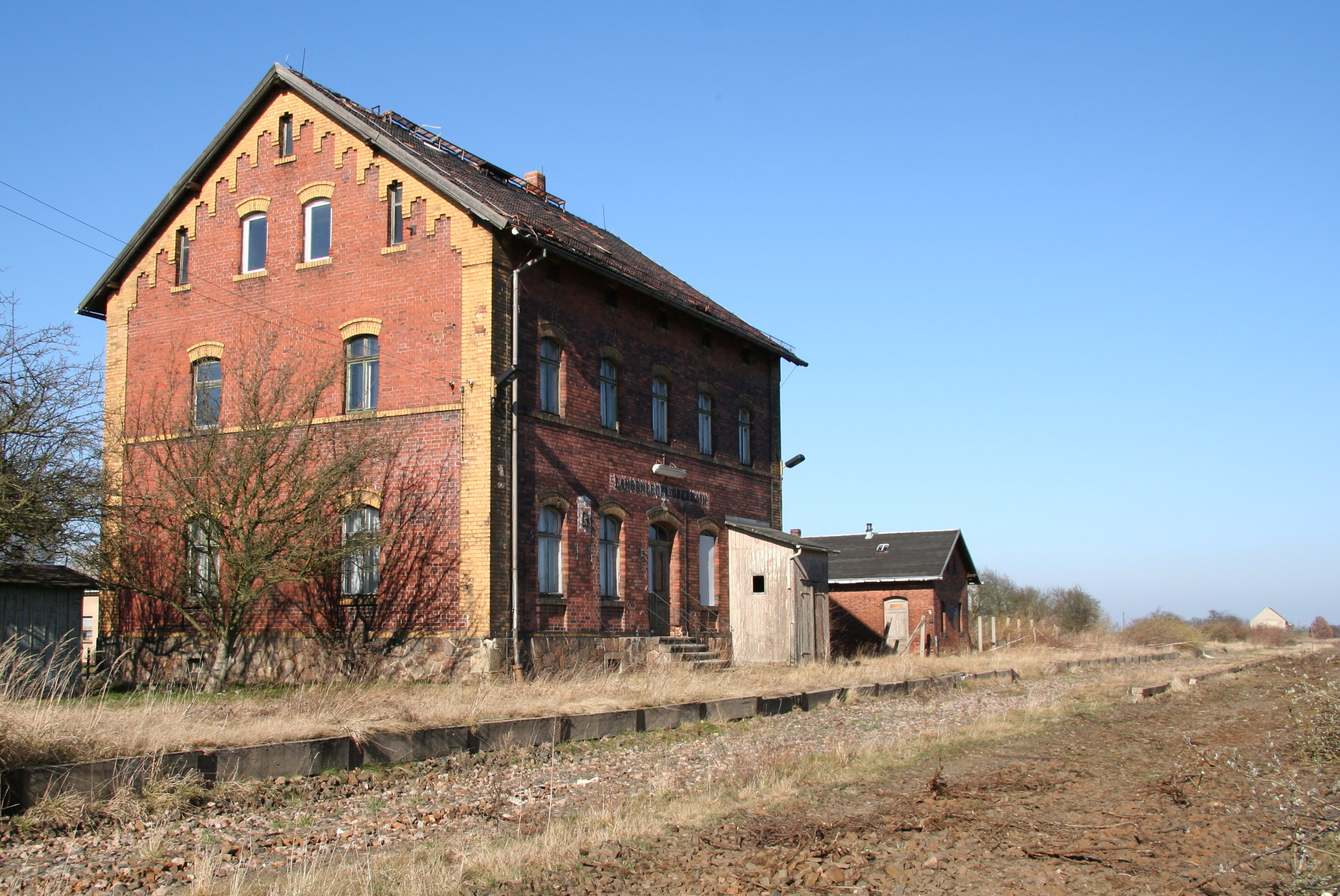
- Langenleuba-Oberhain station building

Overview
- Line number: 6632 / 6432; RP
- Locale: Saxony, Germany

Service
- Route number: 509 (1981)

Technical
- Line length: 20.999 km (13.048 mi)
- Track gauge: 1,435 mm (4 ft 8 1/2 in) standard gauge
- Minimum radius: 300 m (980 ft)
- Maximum incline: 2.0%

The Rochlitz–Penig railway was a 21 km long branchline in Saxony from Rochlitz via Narsdorf to Penig which opened in 1872 and connected the railway lines Neukieritzsch–Chemnitz and Glauchau–Wurzen. Its Narsdorf–Penig section was decommissioned in 1998 and has been lifted, the remainder was decommissioned in 2000.

== History ==
The line was opened on 8 April 1872 together with the Neukieritzsch–Chemnitz railway. Its purpose was to connect the settlements and the industries in the valley of Zwickauer Mulde, which at that time had no railway yet, to the mainline on the plateau above the river. The Muldentalbahn was only opened four years later on 29 May 1876.

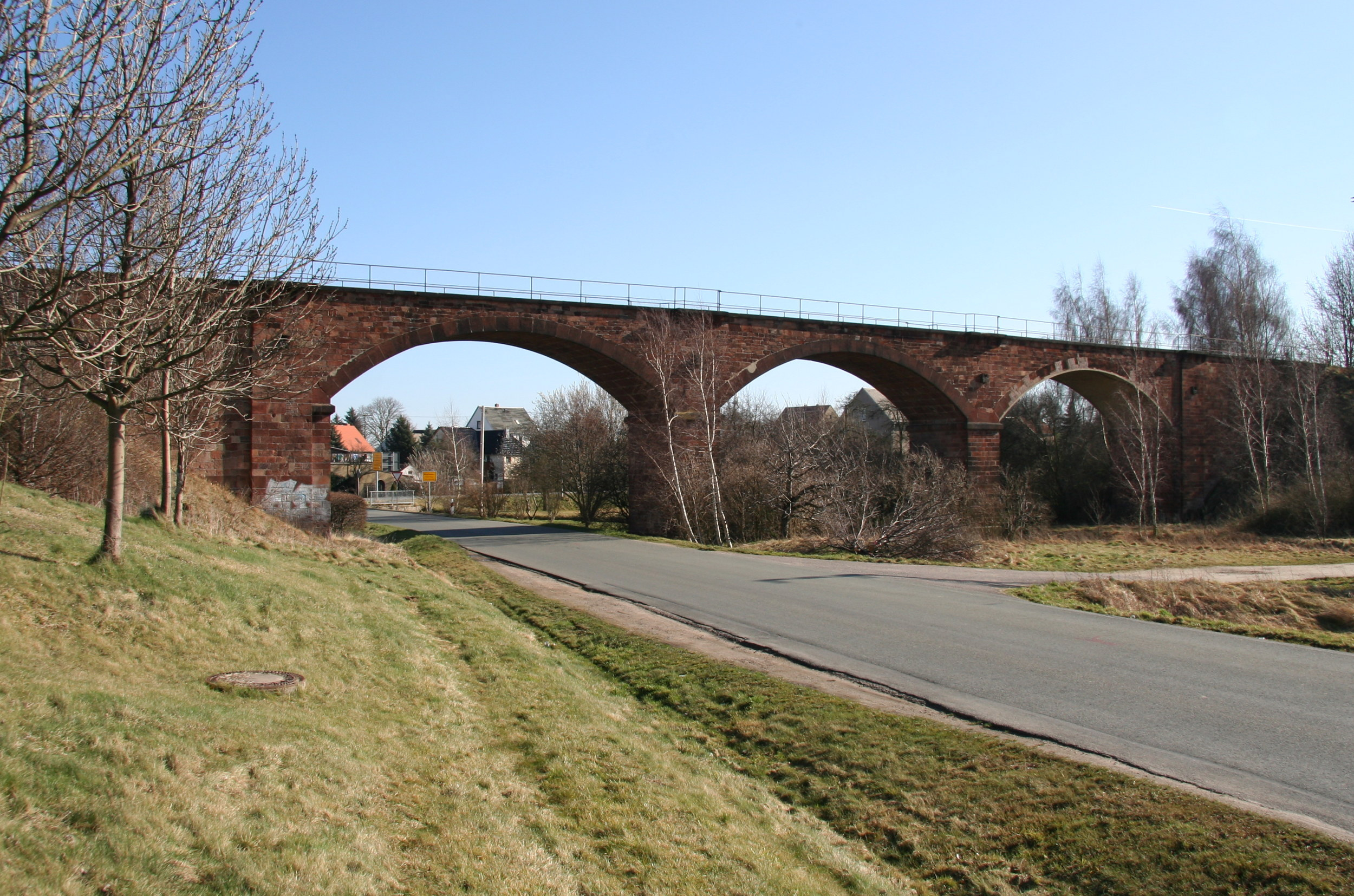
Viadukt Obergräfenhain

From 19 August 1947 on trains only ran between Narsdorf and Penig, the section between Rochlitz and Narsdorf had been lifted for war reparations. The latter was relaid until 1965 and was initially only used for freight trains and for light engine movements, until passenger traffic was resumed in summer 1969, initially with only two trains each way on weekends which continued to and from Altenburg and Waldheim. According to the winter timetable 1980/81 there were four daily trains each way between Rochlitz and Narsdorf, without any intermediate stops. Köttwitzsch halt was re-opened in 1990. Breitenborn station was never re-opened.

The line lost its importance in both passenger and freight traffic rapidly after the political changes in 1989. Passenger traffic between Narsdorf and Penig ceased already on 26 May 1989 due to a staff shortage and the subsequent demotion of Langenleuba-Oberhain station to an unstaffed halt. The remainder of the line was used in the 1990s by Regionalbahn trains on the Chemnitz–Narsdorf–Rochlitz route, scheduled to run every two hours. Only on 28 May 2000 these were cancelled in favour of new bus routes offered by Verkehrsverbund Mittelsachsen. At the same date, freight traffic between Langenleuba-Oberhain and Penig ceased.

The section between Abzw Narsdorf Bogendreieck and Langenleuba-Oberhain was officially decommissioned on 15 August 1998, freight traffic stopped on the same day. The Rochlitz–Narsdorf section was officially decommissioned on 1 January 2002.

Deutsche Regionaleisenbahn (DRE) leased the decommissioned line in 2005 with the intention of resuming railway traffic between Rochlitz and Narsdorf. On 10 April 2008, the government of Saxony sanctioned the operation of public railway infrastructure for 20 years.

The Penig–Rathendorf section of the newly built Bundesautobahn 72 follows the alignment of parts of the decommissioned railway.
