= Glauchau–Wurzen railway =

Former railway line in Saxony, Germany

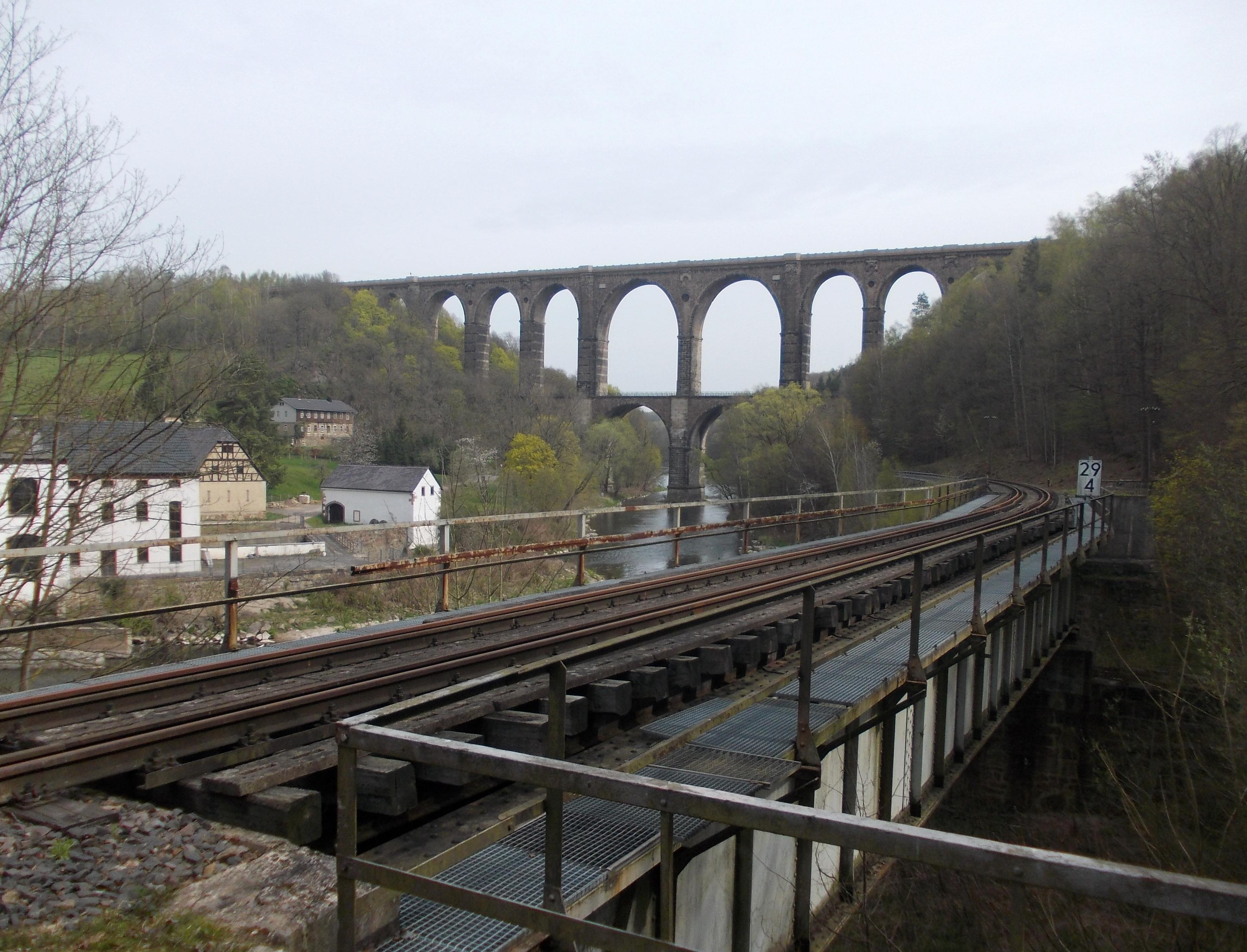
- Railway line in the Mulde valley beneath Göhren viaduct

Overview
- Other name(s): Muldentalbahn
- Status: partly dismantled, no regular operation
- Owner: Mittelsächsische Eisenbahninfrastrukturgesellschaft, Deutsche Bahn
- Line number: 6629
- Locale: Saxony, Germany
- Termini: Glauchau; Wurzen
- Stations: 25

Service
- Type: Branch line
- Route number: 529 (2002)
- Operator(s): Deutsche Regionaleisenbahn GmbH, Deutscher Bahnkunden-Verband, Deutsche Bahn

History
- Opened: 1875/1877

Technical
- Line length: 61.32 km (38.10 mi)
- Track gauge: 1,435 mm (4 ft 8 1/2 in) standard gauge
- Minimum radius: 250 m (820 ft)
- Maximum incline: 1.2%

The Glauchau–Wurzen railway is a mostly disused, secondary railway line in Saxony. It follows the valleys of Zwickauer Mulde and Mulde from Glauchau via Rochlitz and Grimma to Wurzen and is hence also known as Muldentalbahn (Mulde valley railway). Regular traffic on the line ended in the early 2000s. The section between Glauchau and Großbothen has been leased by Deutsche Regionaleisenbahn since 2005 and has been protected as a cultural monument since 2016, the remainder has been decommissioned.

== History ==
Already in 1860, a committee formed in Penig with the aim of constructing a railway from Glauchau to Wurzen. In 1864 the Saxon parliament permitted the construction of a railway from Leipzig along the Mulde valley to Chemnitz. Since no private entrepreneur could be found for this project, permission was granted instead in 1868 for a railway from Glauchau via Wurzen to the border with Prussia. The private Muldenthal-Eisenbahngesellschaft was awarded the concession for the construction and operation of a railway between Glauchau and Wurzen on 29 April 1872. No concession was granted for the line to the border, because a continuation in Prussia could not be guaranteed.

While the right of way was intended for double-track operation which was taken into account in the construction of the Rochsburg tunnel and several bridges, due to the lack of a northern continuation the traffic never reached the levels that would have justified doubling of the line. Nevertheless the line was built to mainline standards. It was put into operation in several stages:

- from Glauchau to Penig on 10 May 1875,
- from Rochlitz to Großbothen on 9 December 1875,
- from Penig to Rochlitz on 29 May 1876, and
- from Großbothen to Wurzen on 30 June 1877.

On 1 August 1878 the Muldenthal-Eisenbahngesellschaft was taken over by the Saxon state, the line and the rolling stock passed into the hands of the Royal Saxon State Railways. The separate station in Wurzen was closed, and the station of the Leipzig–Dresden railway became the terminus of the Muldentalbahn.

The Rabenstein bridge near Grimma was strengthened in 1931 which was possible without interrupting the traffic, because the line and the bridge had been prepared for double-tracked operation.

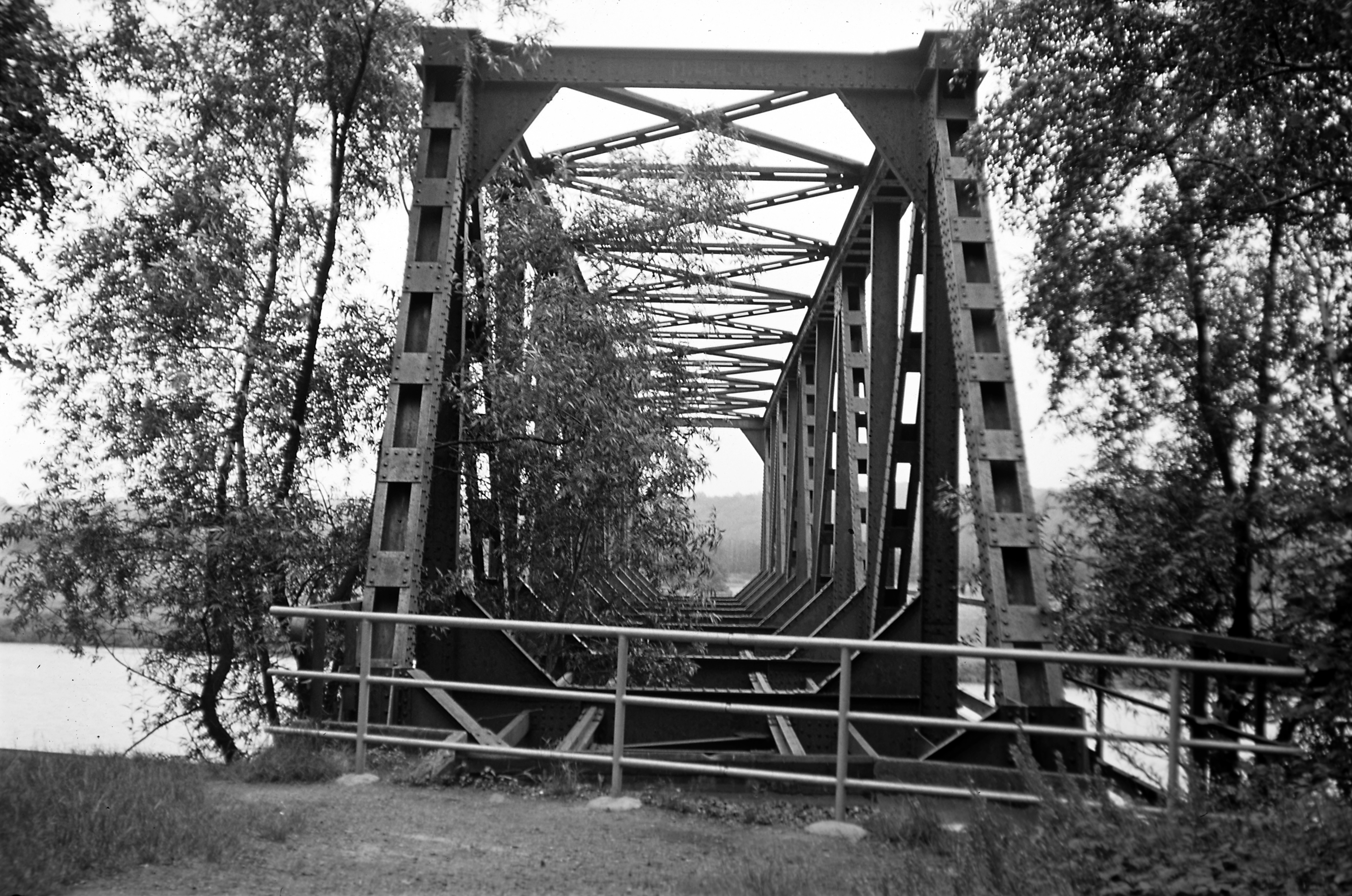
Last remaining span of the Rabenstein bridge near Grimma, repaired after World War II, but unused (1977)

On 15 April 1945 the Rabenstein bridge across the Mulde river was destroyed, and the line remained interrupted between Großbothen and Grimma unterer Bahnhof. Tracks on this section were lifted for war reparations, and despite repairs to the bridge they were never relaid. Passenger traffic between Grimma unterer Bahnhof and Nerchau ceased on 28 May 1967, but was partly reopened with trains between Golzern and Wurzen on 24 September 1967, before ceasing on this section completely on 31 May 1969. The Wurzen-Golzern section remained in operation for freight traffic as an extended siding of Wurzen station, and tracks were renewed between Nerchau and Golzern in the 1970s. The right of way near Dorna-Döben station was used for a widening of the parallel road.

A connecting curve between this line and the Borsdorf–Coswig railway was built south of Großbothen in the mid-1970s. It was mainly intended for strategic reasons and was only used for regular traffic for a short time in 1995 while a bridge in Großbothen was renewed. Preparations had been made for deploying a temporary bridge across the River Mulde between Neichen and Trebsen, the terminus of the line from Beucha. For this purpose, a track had been laid from Trebsen station to the left bank of the river.

Freight traffic between Wurzen and Golzern ended on 2 June 1996. Only a short section between Wurzen and a silicate factory in nearby Dehnitz remains in operation, the remainder of the Wurzen–Grimma section has been transformed into a cycle trail.

Faulty trackwork caused the passenger trains between Colditz and Rochlitz to be replaced by buses from 6 December 1999, and freight traffic between Großbothen and Wechselburg officially ceased on 5 December 1999. Passenger traffic between Rochlitz and Großbothen ceased on 27 May 2000, freight traffic between Glauchau and Wechselburg on 2 July 2000, and passenger traffic between Wechselburg and Rochlitz on 9 June 2001. Operations on the last section between Glauchau and Wechselburg ceased on 13 August 2002 in the course of the 2002 European floods which caused widespread damage in the area, and because of the poor state of the line and several engineering works along it.

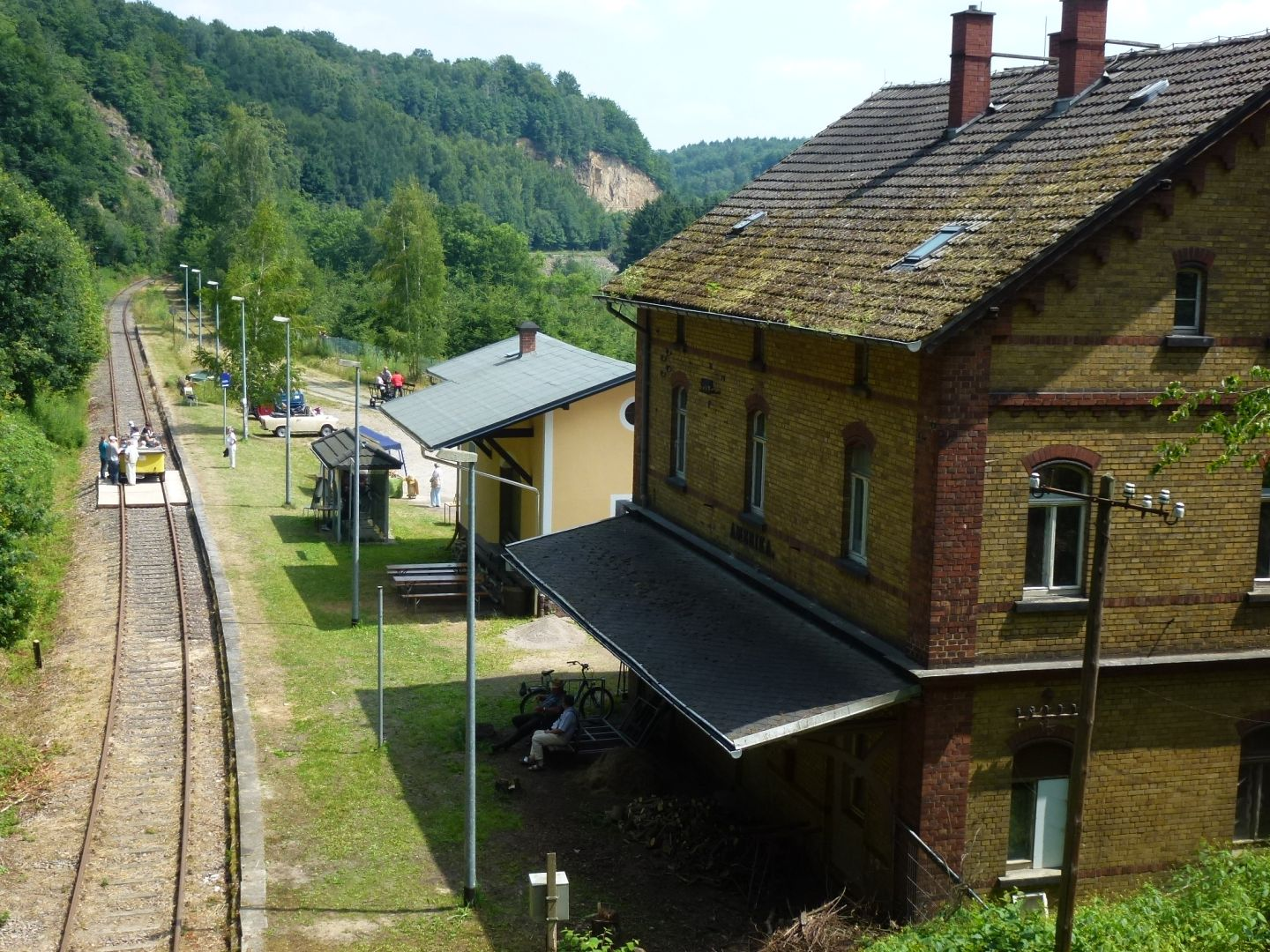
Track motor car in Amerika halt (2013)

Deutsche Regionaleisenbahn (DRE) leased the Glauchau-Großbothen line and the Rochlitz–Narsdorf section of the Rochlitz–Penig railway in 2005 with the intention of preserving the infrastructure and resuming the traffic in stages. Lack of finances, damages to the embankment following the construction of a motorway, and damages to bridges due to vehicle collisions have delayed the resumption of operations, so that the first DRE train between Glauchau and Wolkenburg could only run in October 2010. After some sections of track had been cleared of vegetation, a regional support association in cooperation with a major Saxon railway club have conducted several touristic operations with a track motor car.

When the grounds and the infrastructure of the line were sold by Deutsche Bahn to a private company in Chemnitz in late 2015, fears of a dismantlement of the line were countered by a successful petition for the line being granted the status of a protected monument. This was awarded in early 2016.

== Description of the line ==
From Glauchau to Sermuth the line follows the river Zwickauer Mulde, from there to Wurzen the joint Mulde river.

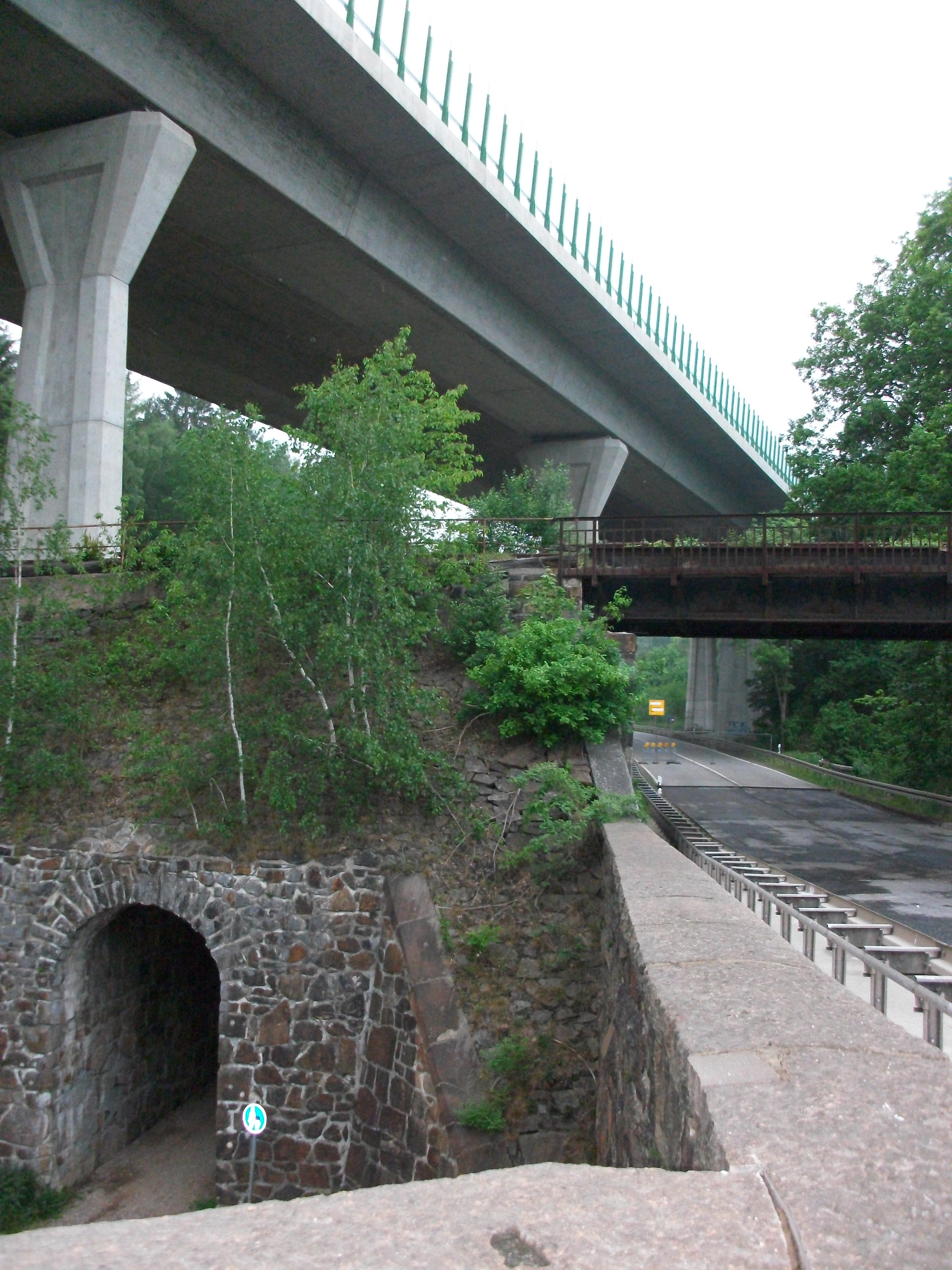
Motorway bridge across river, railway, and road near Penig

The Glauchau–Wurzen line branches off the Dresden–Werdau railway at the eastern end of Glauchau station. Near Remse station, it runs parallel to today's Bundesstraße 175, but on the other side of the river. Between Wolkenburg and Thierbach-Zinnberg stations it changes from the right to the left bank of Zwickauer Mulde. Between Thierbach-Zinnberg and Penig it crosses over state road S57 on a bridge, just metres before the latter crosses the river on another bridge. A third bridge leads the motorway A 72, opened in 2011, across river, road, and railway.

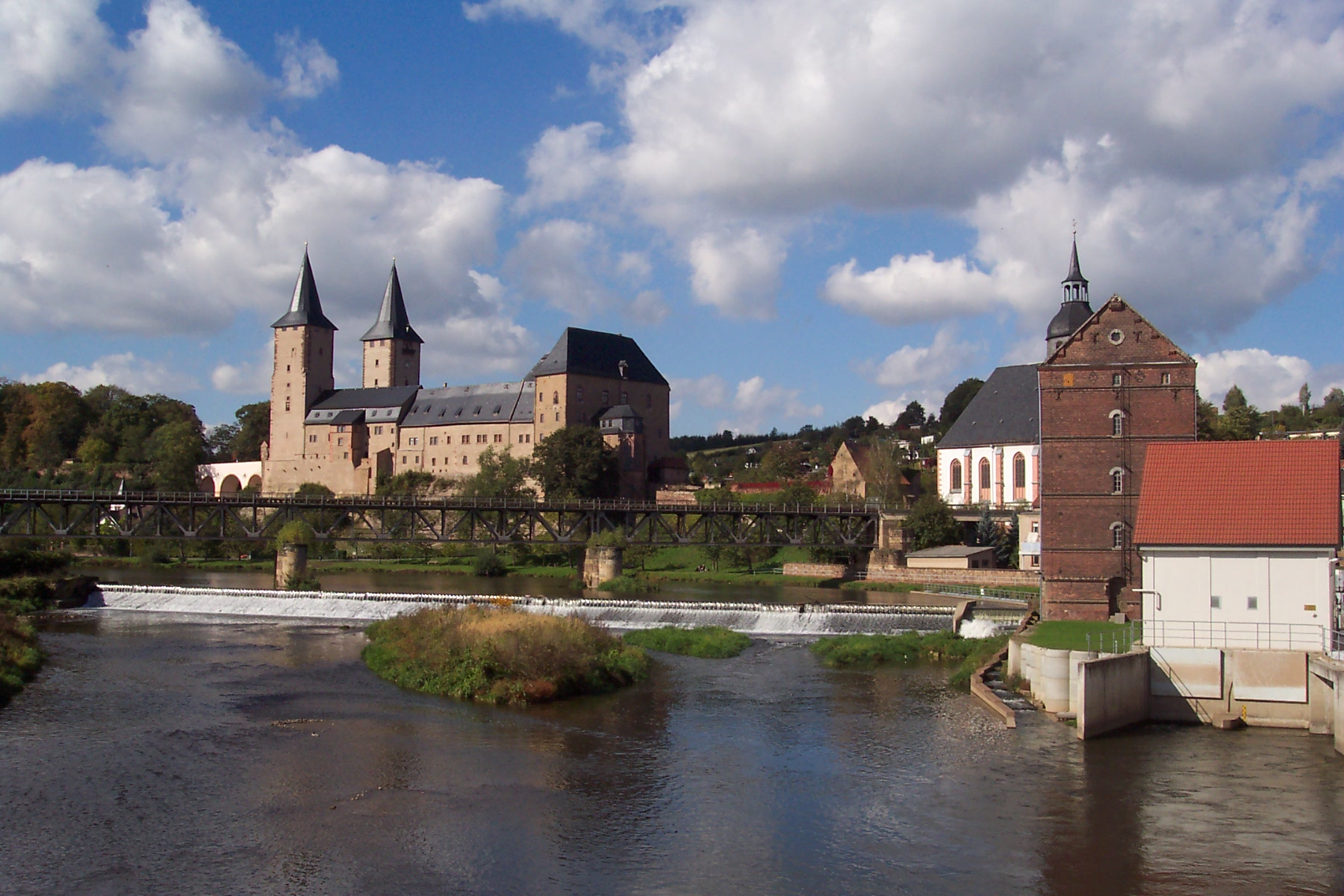
Railway bridge near Rochlitz castle

In Penig station the line from Narsdorf which had been opened in 1872 joined from the north. After Rochsburg station the railway passes a tunnel and then a bridge across the river, and after Lunzenau station it passes under the Göhren Viaduct, which leads the Neukieritzsch–Chemnitz railway across the valley of Zwickauer Mulde. About 500 m on, immediately after the bridge across the Chemnitz, the Wechselburg–Küchwald railway approached from the right and ran parallel to the Mulde valley line until Wechselburg station where the two lines joined. Between Steudten halt and Rochlitz station, the line crosses to the left bank of the river on a lattice girder bridge near Rochlitz castle.

Rochlitz station was the junction with the Rochlitz–Penig railway and the Waldheim–Rochlitz railway. North of Rochlitz the Mulde valley line crosses to the right bank of the river, passing Lastau station and crossing to the left bank again before reaching Colditz, running parallel to today's Bundesstraße 107. Before reaching Großbothen station, the terminus of the southern section of the line since its interruption in 1945, it crosses over the Borsdorf–Coswig railway. The tracks of the Glauchau–Wurzen railway are north of the Großbothen station building.

North of Großbothen the line passed Kloster Nimbschen halt and crossed on Rabenstein bridge on the right bank of the Mulde. It followed the bends of the river, passing under motorway A 14 north of Golzern station, until Neichen which was the junction of the narrow gauge line from Mügeln. There the railway left the immediate vicinity of the river and ran in a mostly straight line until Wurzen station where it joined the Leipzig–Dresden railway from the southeast at signal box 2.

== Literature ==
- Manfred Berger (1994). Die Muldenthal-Eisenbahn (2nd ed.). Berlin: transpress. ISBN 3-344-70907-0.
- Steffen Kluttig (2003). Eisenbahnhistorie im Muldenland. Der Eisenbahnknoten Rochlitz und seine Sandbahnen. Witzschdorf: Bildverlag Thomas Böttger. ISBN 3-9808250-4-3.
