= Schweikershain =

- Ortsteil of Erlau
- Interactive map of Schweikershain
- Location within Germany Location within Saxony
- Coordinates: 51°2′48″N 12°57′1″E
- Country: Germany
- State: Saxony
- District: Mittelsachsen
- Municipality: Erlau

Area
  - Total: 4.71 km^{2} (1.82 sq mi)

Population (2011)
  - Total: 520
  - Density: 110/km^{2} (290/sq mi)
- Time zone: UTC+01:00 (CET)
  - Summer (DST): UTC+02:00 (CEST)
- Postal codes: 09306
- Dialling codes: 03727, 037327, 037382
- Vehicle registration: FG, BED, DL, FLÖ, HC, MW, RL

Schweikershain is a village in Landkreis Mittelsachsen, Saxony, Germany. It is part of Erlau municipality.

== Geography ==
Schweikershain is situated about 4.5 km north of Erlau, 8 km north of Mittweida, 8 km southwest of Waldheim and 5 km southeast of Geringswalde, in the Central Saxon Loess Hill Country, spreading in an east-western direction along a stream which feeds some ponds in the eastern part of the village. The road between Geringswalde and Mittweida intersects the village slightly west of its centre.

== History ==
The area was colonised in the 14th century by Thuringian and Franconian settlers. A church was already mentioned in 1346, Schweikershain proper was first mentioned in writing in 1428 as Swykirschayn. It was founded as a Waldhufendorf The name probably referred to the founder. Kunz von Kaufungen was enfeoffed with the local manor from 1449 to 1451. In 1544 it was acquired by the family von Carlowitz, 1718 it passed into the hands of the family von Wallwitz in whose possession it remained until 1945. A new church was built in 1719.

A first schoolhouse was built in 1811. In 1852 the construction of a railway station on the Riesa–Chemnitz railway started. A new school which is still in use was opened in 1893. The village was connected to the electricity network in 1911.

Schweikershain was under the jurisdiction of Amt Rochlitz until the middle of the 19th century. When the judicial powers of the lord of the manor were abrogated in 1855, the court of law in Geringswalde became responsible for the village. Later the village became part of Amtshauptmannschaft Döbeln (later Kreis Döbeln) until 1952 when it was passed back into Kreis Rochlitz. It shared the history of the latter, passing to Landkreis Mittweida in 1994 and to Landkreis Mittelsachsen in 2008.

In 1947 the manor house was turned into a recreation home for tuberculosis patients and in 1959 into a retirement home. The first agricultural cooperative was founded in 1953. The school was extended in 1959 and became a ten-year Polytechnic Secondary School in 1964. After the German reunification Schweikershain, together with Crossen, Milkau, and Beerwalde, joined Erlau municipality. The school has been transformed into a school for children with special educational needs in 1997.

== Buildings ==
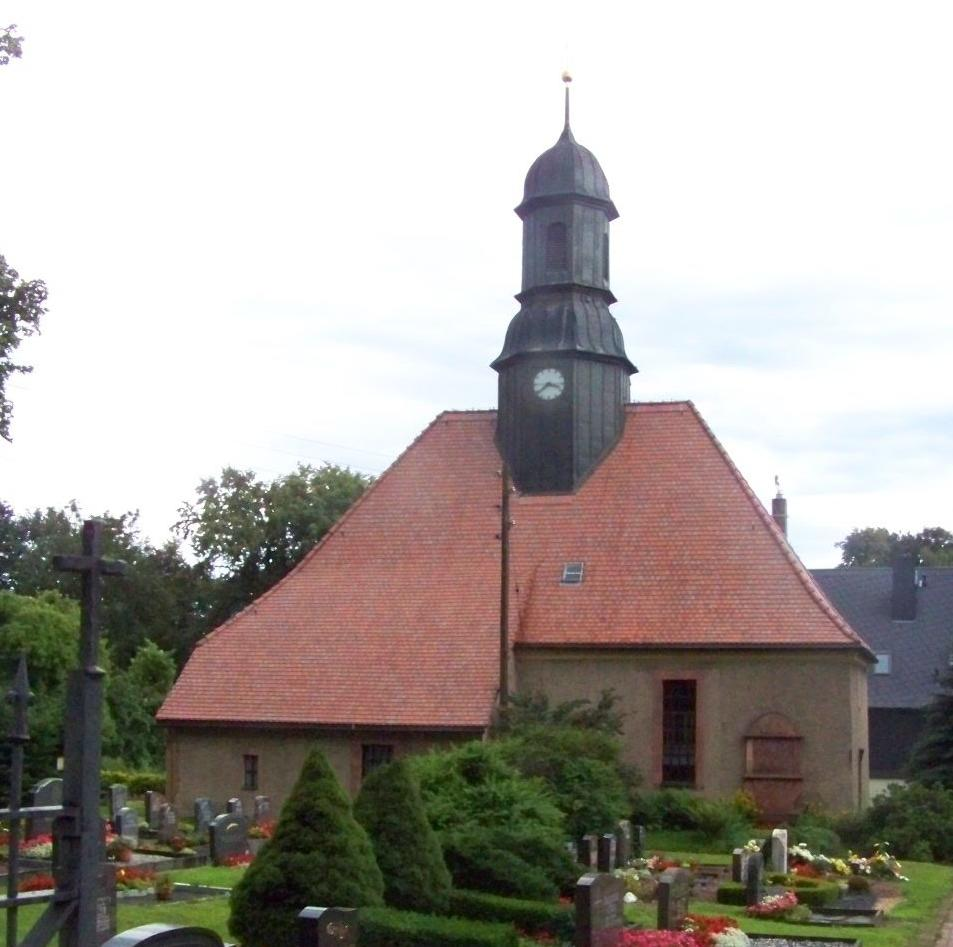
Church in Schweikershain

The church of 1719 still houses a Gothic church tabernacle coming from the medieval predecessor building. In 1759, a pipe organ made by Gottfried Silbermann was erected on the choir gallery.

The watermill, in 1702 used to grind corn and also as a sawmill, was rebuilt in 1810 and electrified in 1937. It stopped production in 1959, the associated bakery in 1971. In 1992/1993 the building was converted to house guest rooms, apartments and a meeting room, in 1999 the register office of Erlau was established there, too.

== Transportation ==
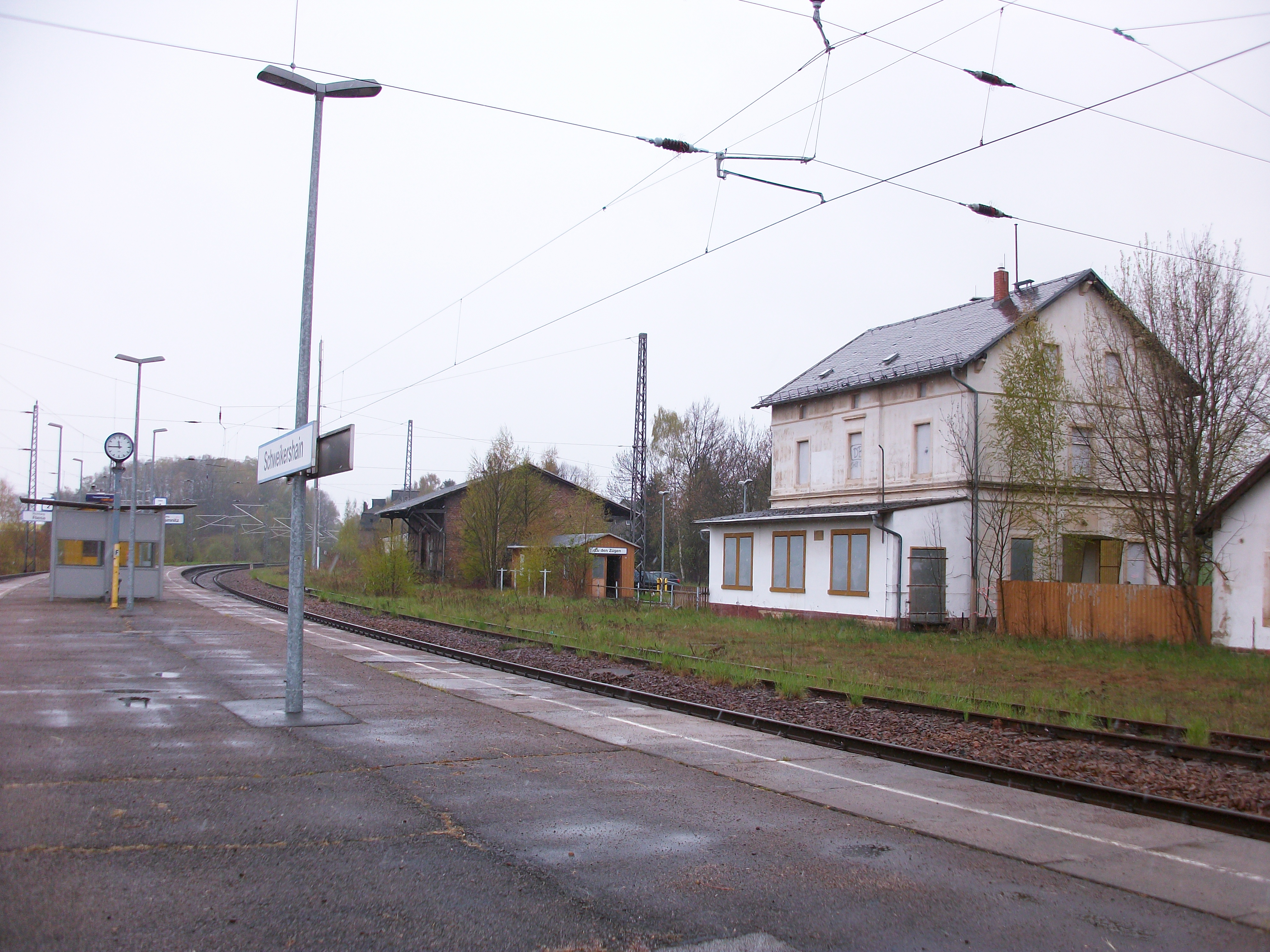
Schweikershain railway station

Schweikershain has a station on the railway line between Riesa and Chemnitz, located about 1 km south of the village on the boundary of Erlau and Mittweida municipalities. Hourly services on weekdays and two-hourly services on weekends offer connections to Chemnitz and Riesa, most of them running to and from Elsterwerda. On weekdays, Schweikershain is served by buses of Verkehrsverbund Mittelsachsen running between Geringswalde and Mittweida.
