= Mittelsachsen 4 =

State electoral district of Germany

20: Mittelsachsen 4
- Electoral district for the Landtag of Saxony
- Mittelsachsen 4 in 2024
- District: Mittelsachsen
- Electorate: 60,817 (2024)
- Major settlements: Döbeln, Geringswalde, Hartha, Leisnig, Roßwein, and Waldheim

Current electoral district
- Party: AfD
- Member: Lars Kuppi

Mittelsachsen 4 is an electoral constituency (German: Wahlkreis) represented in the Landtag of Saxony. It elects one member via first-past-the-post voting. Under the constituency numbering system, it is designated as constituency 20. It is within the district of Mittelsachsen.

== Geography ==
The constituency comprises the towns of Döbeln, Geringswalde, Hartha, Leisnig, Roßwein, and Waldheim, and the districts of Großweitzschen, Kriebstein, Jahnatal, Rossau, and Striegistal within Mittelsachsen.

There were 60,817 eligible voters in 2024.

== Members ==
Election	Member	Party	%
2014	Sven Liebhauser	CDU	45.0
2019	Lars Kuppi	AfD	31.7
2024	Lars Kuppi	AfD	38.9

== Election results ==
=== 2024 election ===
State election (2024): Mittelsachsen 4
Notes:	Blue background denotes the winner of the electorate vote. Pink background denotes a candidate elected from their party list. Yellow background denotes an electorate win by a list member, or other incumbent. A ✓ or ✗ denotes status of any incumbent, win or lose respectively.						
Party	Candidate	Votes	%	±%	Party votes	%	±%
AfD	✓ Lars Kuppi	16,797	38.9	▲7.0	15,057	34.8	▲4.3
CDU	Rudolf Lehle	13,185	30.6	▼0.1	14,107	32.6	▼1.2
BSW	Mirijam Saggau	3,806	8.8		5,252	12.1	
FW	Maria Euchler	3,791	8.8	▲0.1	1,865	4.3	▲0.2
SPD	Henning Homann	2,763	6.4	▼3.5	2,586	6.0	▼2.7
Left	M. Steffi Tändler-Walenta	1,365	3.2	▼7.7	1,120	2.6	▼7.3
Greens	Kristina Wittig	571	1.3	▼2.1	647	1.5	▼2.1
FDP	Rick Müller	483	1.1	▼3.3	378	0.9	▼3.4
Freie Sachsen	S. Trautmann	376	0.9		1,135	2.6	
APT					447	1.0	
PARTEI					228	0.5	▼0.4
BD					107	1.0	
Pirates					80	0.2	
Values					74	0.2	
dieBasis					59	0.1	
V-Partei3					38	0.1	
BüSo					22	0.1	
ÖDP					17	0.0	
Bündnis C					16	0.0	
Informal votes		504			406		
Total valid votes		43,137			43,235		
Turnout		43,641	71.8	▲7.8			
AfD hold	Majority	3,612	8.3				

=== 2019 election ===
State election (2019): Mittelsachsen 4
Notes:	Blue background denotes the winner of the electorate vote. Pink background denotes a candidate elected from their party list. Yellow background denotes an electorate win by a list member, or other incumbent. A ✓ or ✗ denotes status of any incumbent, win or lose respectively.						
Party	Candidate	Votes	%	±%	Party votes	%	±%
AfD	Lars Kuppi	10,093	31.7		9,622	30.1	▲21.7
CDU	Rudolf Lehle	9,508	29.8	▼15.2	10,814	33.9	▼8.1
Left	Marika Tändler-Walenta	3,461	10.9	▼10.4	3,208	10.0	▼9.9
SPD	Henning Homann	3,446	10.8	▼4.1	2,843	8.9	▼3.0
FW	Sven Weißflog	2,841	8.9		1,217	3.8	▲2.5
FDP	Constanze Cyrnik	1,474	4.6	▼1.4	1,402	4.4	▼0.7
Greens	Maria-Christin Anderfuhren	1,052	3.3	▲0.1	1,168	3.7	▲0.9
APT					467	1.5	▲0.4
NPD					359	1.1	▼4.8
PARTEI					303	0.9	▲0.5
Verjüngungsforschung					187	0.6	
The Blue Party					102	0.3	
Pirates					69	0.2	▼0.6
ÖDP					52	0.2	
DKP					31	0.1	
PDV					24	0.1	
Awakening of German Patriots - Central Germany					23	0.1	
Humanists					19	0.1	
BüSo					15	0.0	▼0.1
Informal votes		473			423		
Total valid votes		31,875			31,925		
Turnout		32,348	62.5	▲16.3			
AfD gain from CDU	Majority	585	1.9				

=== 2014 election ===
State election (2014): Mittelsachsen 4
Notes:	Blue background denotes the winner of the electorate vote. Pink background denotes a candidate elected from their party list. Yellow background denotes an electorate win by a list member, or other incumbent. A ✓ or ✗ denotes status of any incumbent, win or lose respectively.						
Party	Candidate	Votes	%	±%	Party votes	%	±%
CDU	Sven Liebhauser	11,175	45.0		10,502	42.0	
Left		5,289	21.3		4,961	19.9	
SPD		3,715	14.9		2,980	11.9	
AfD					2,090	8.4	
NPD		1,862	7.5		1,478	5.9	
FDP		1,483	6.0		1,268	5.1	
Greens		802	3.2		689	2.8	
FW					323	1.3	
APT					280	1.1	
Pirates		526	2.1		196	0.8	
PARTEI					111	0.4	
Pro Germany Citizens' Movement					54	0.2	
DSU					35	0.1	
BüSo					21	0.1	
Informal votes		515			379		
Total valid votes		24,852			24,988		
Turnout		25,367	46.2	▼17.9			
CDU win new seat	Majority	5,886	23.7				

== See also ==
- Politics of Saxony
- Landtag of Saxony
