= Forchheim (disambiguation) =

Forchheim may refer to the following places in Germany:

- Forchheim, a town in Bavaria
- Forchheim (district), in Bavaria
- Forchheim am Kaiserstuhl, a municipality in Baden-Württemberg
- Forchheim (Rheinstetten), part of Rheinstetten, Baden-Württemberg
- Forchheim, a subdivision of Pockau, Saxony
- Forchheim, a part of Ziegra-Knobelsdorf, Saxony
