= Lars Kuppi =

German politician (born 1971)

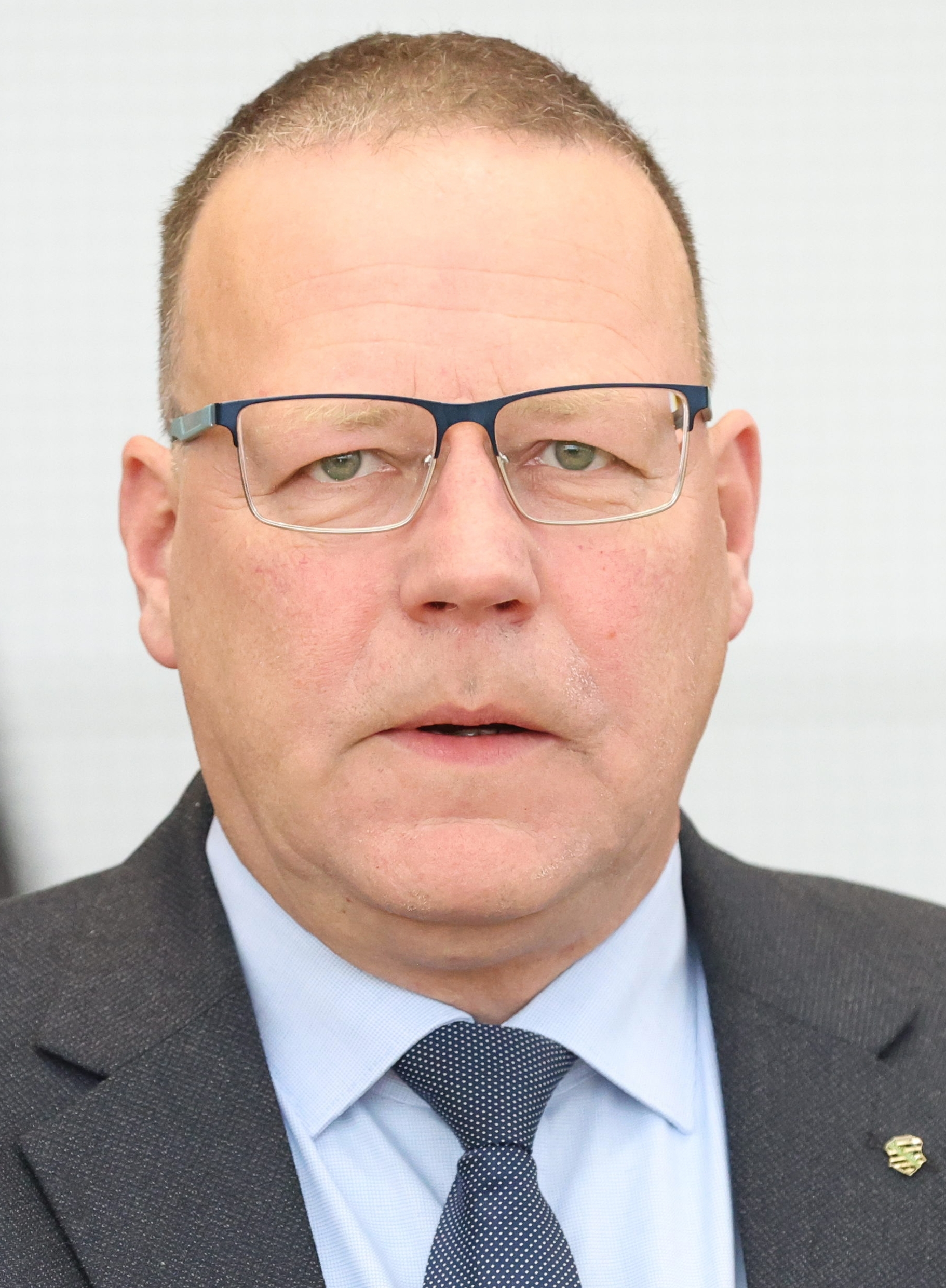
- Kuppi in 2024

Member of the Landtag of Saxony
- Incumbent
- Assumed office 1 October 2019
- Preceded by: Sven Liebhauser
- Constituency: Mittelsachsen 4

Personal details
- Born: 1971 (age 54–55) Döbeln
- Party: Alternative for Germany

Lars Kuppi (born 1971 in Döbeln) is a German politician serving as a member of the Landtag of Saxony since 2019. He has served as chairman of the Alternative for Germany in Mittelsachsen since 2020.
