= Döbeln Tramway =

Horse-drawn tramway in Döbel, Germany

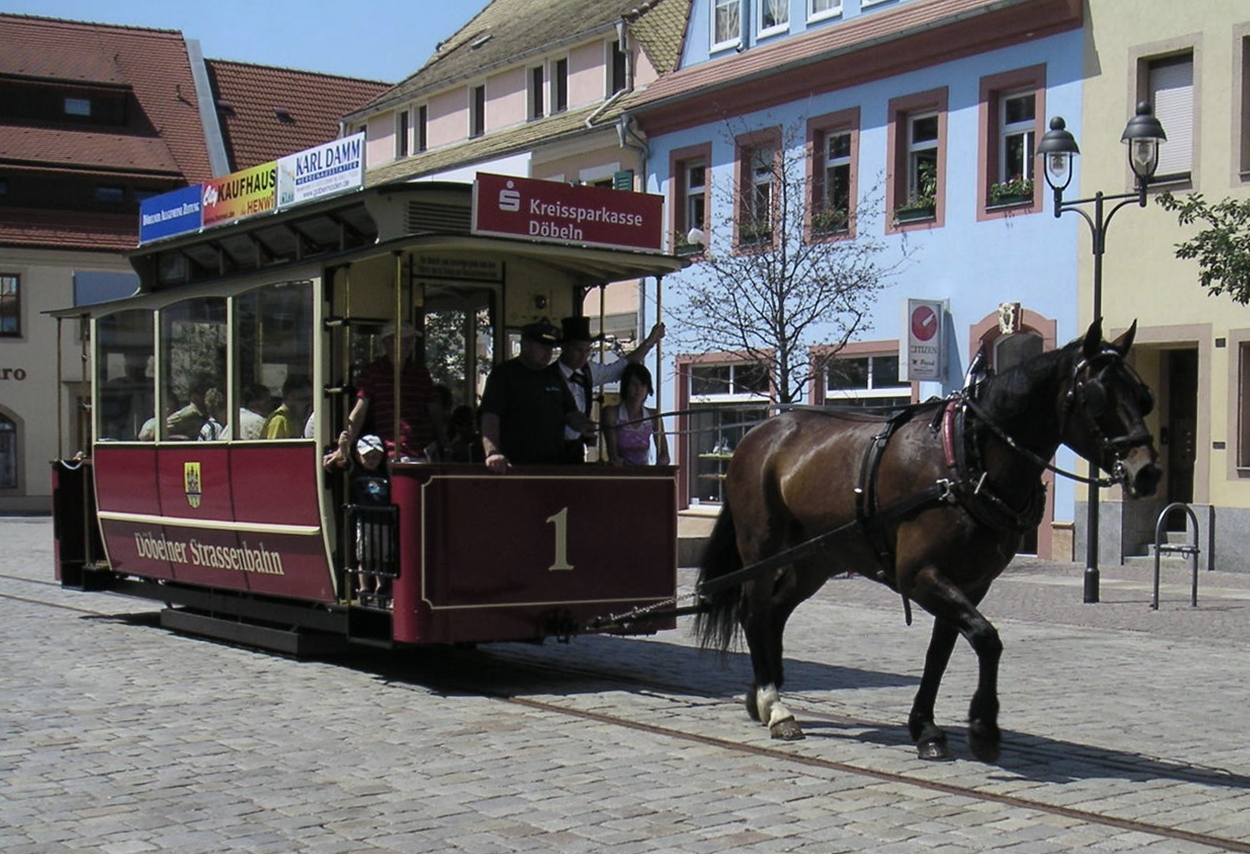
Döbeln horse tram in 2007

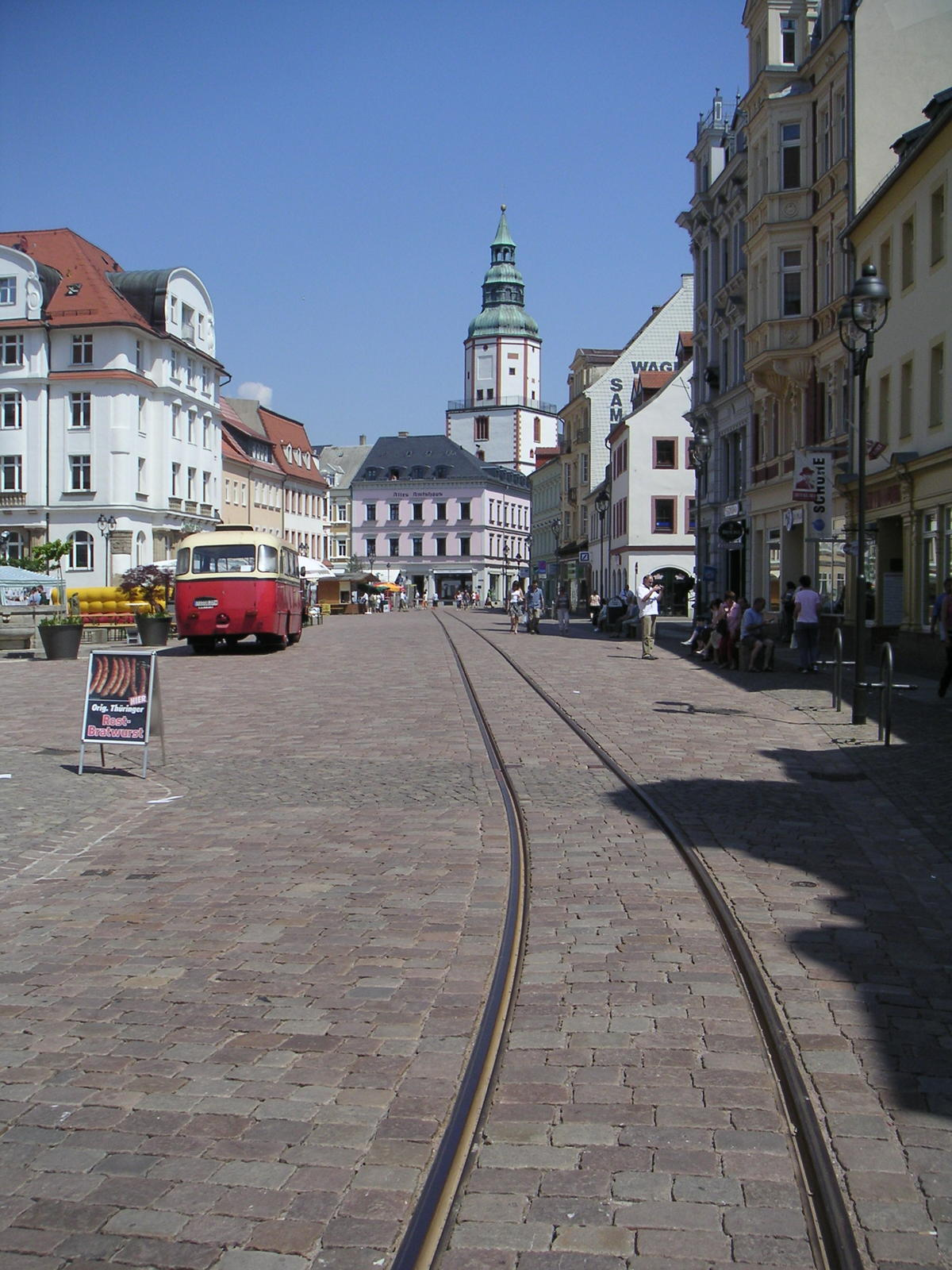
Döbeln tram tracks in the Obermarkt

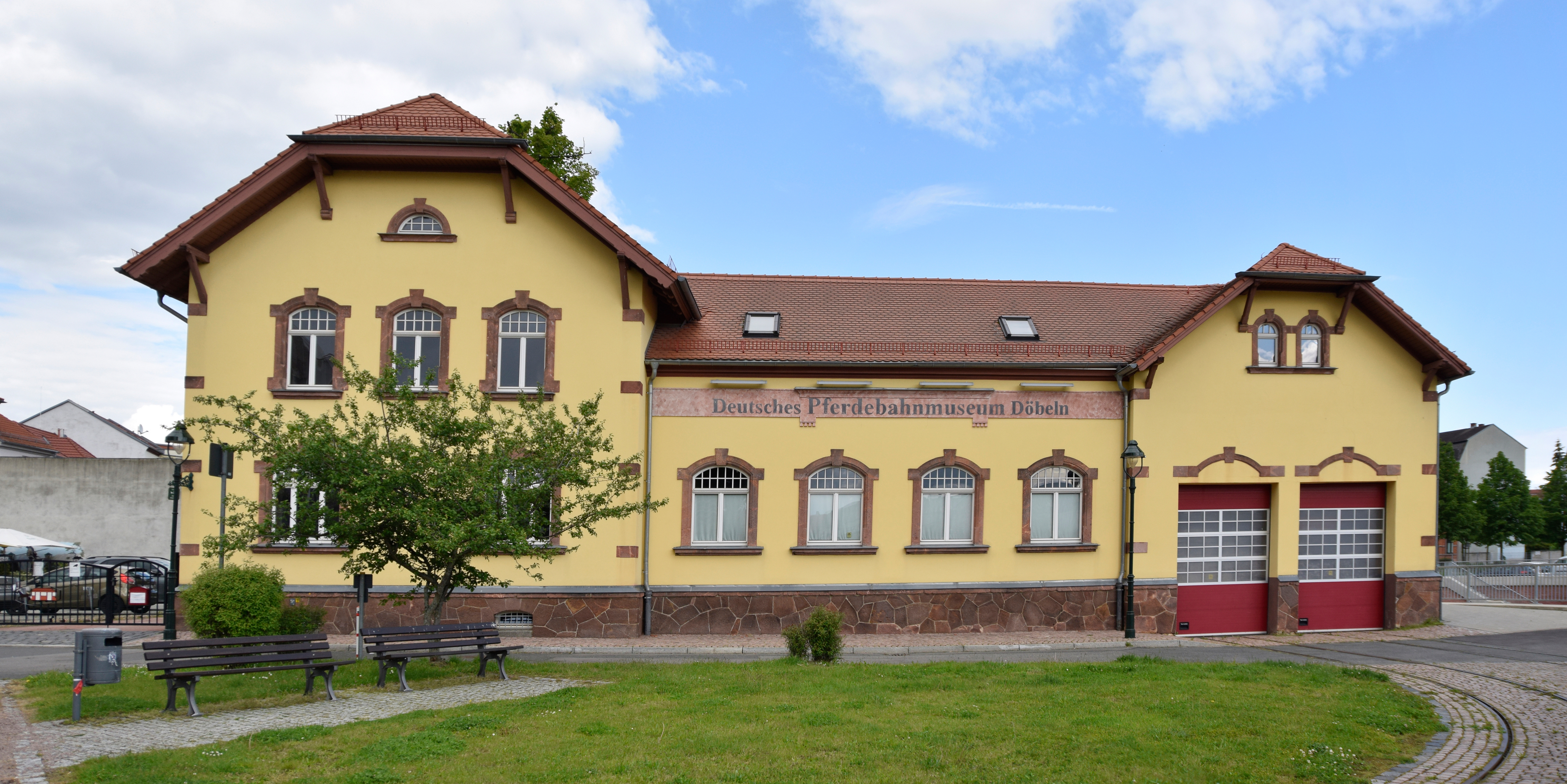
The Döbeln Tramway Museum

The Döbeln Tramway or Döbelner Straßenbahn is a 1,000 mm (3 ft 3 3/8 in) metre gauge tramway in the German town of Döbeln. It is the only horse-drawn tram line to operate on its original urban route in Germany, and one of only a handful in the world.

The Döbeln Tramway was built in 1892 and connected the town's railway station with its market square until 1926, when it was replaced by a bus. Throughout its period of operation it remained horse-drawn, and was one of the last such of such lines to remain in operation in Germany. Even after it ceased operation, some of its tram track remained in place and served as a reminder of the old line. Occasional suggestions to restore the line surfaced over the years of closure but, until the beginning of the 21st century, no action was taken.

In 2002 flooding in the centre of Döbeln caused serious damage and required significant restoration work to restore the town's streets. As part of this work, the opportunity was taken to relay 800 metres (2,625 ft) of track from Obermarkt to Theatre. A former Meißen tram dating from 1899, and used for the last 30 years as a henhouse, was acquired and restored as Döbeln Tramway 1. The line reopened on 9 June 2007.

The line is operated by the Traditionsverein Döbelner Pferdebahn e.V. and, in 2011, was scheduled to operate on the first Saturday of each month from May to October.
