= Erlau =

- Municipality
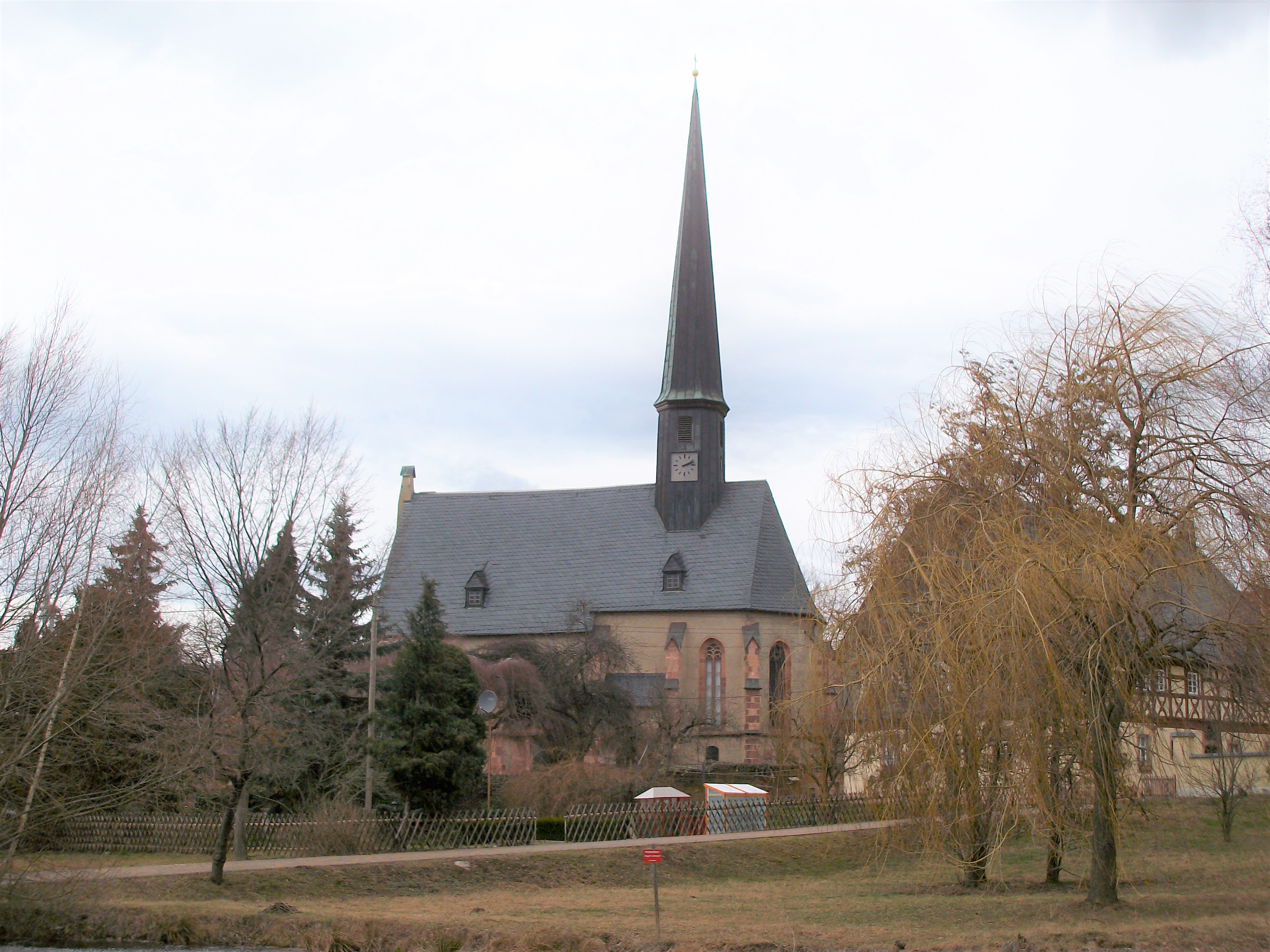
- Church of St Lawrence in Erlau

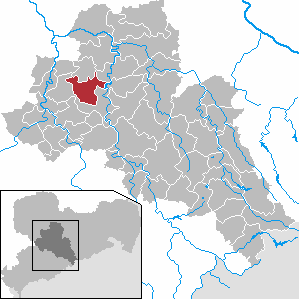
- Location of Erlau within Mittelsachsen district
- Interactive map of Erlau
- Location within Germany Location within Saxony
- Coordinates: 51°0′23″N 12°55′25″E
- Country: Germany
- State: Saxony
- District: Mittelsachsen

Government
  - Mayor (2023–30): Peter Ahnert

Area
  - Total: 37.83 km^{2} (14.61 sq mi)
- Elevation: 320 m (1,050 ft)

Population (2025-12-31)
  - Total: 3,057
  - Density: 80.81/km^{2} (209.3/sq mi)
- Time zone: UTC+01:00 (CET)
  - Summer (DST): UTC+02:00 (CEST)
- Postal codes: 09306
- Dialling codes: 03727
- Vehicle registration: FG
- Website: www.gemeinde-erlau.de

Erlau (German pronunciation: [ˈɛʁlaʊ]) is a municipality in the district of Mittelsachsen in Saxony in Germany. In 1994 it absorbed the former municipalities Beerwalde, Crossen and Schweikershain, and in 1999 Milkau.
