= Georg Rimpler =

German military engineer

- Born: 1636 (most cited), possibly 1634 or 1635; Leisnig, Electorate of Saxony
- Died: August 3, 1683 (aged 46–47); Vienna, Austria
- Military career
- Allegiance: (Sweden) Swedish Empire; Holy Roman Empire
- Rank: Ober-Ingenieur; Kaiserlicher Oberstlieutnant
- Conflicts: Second Northern War: Siege of Riga; Cretan War: Siege of Candia; Great Turkish War: Siege of Vienna (DOW)

Georg Rimpler (born c. 1636, died 1683) was a German military engineer. A well-travelled engineer, Rimpler served in a number of European armies before being appointed Chief Engineer of the Holy Roman Empire in 1681. He was killed during the 1683 Siege of Vienna.

== Biography ==
Rimpler was born Georg Rümpler in Leisnig, Electorate of Saxony, in either 1634, 1635, or 1636. The son of a butcher, Rimpler pursued a military career and joined the Swedish Army at the age of 20. Initially serving as a musketeer, Rimpler fought during the 1656 Siege of Riga and later took an interest in military fortifications. During the 1660s he received an education in Nuremberg, studying under German mathematician Georg Gork.

In 1669 Rimpler accompanied a detachment of Swedish soldiers to Candia, a Venetian possession which was then in the final year of a 20-year long siege by the Ottoman Empire. Rimpler drew inspiration from the effectiveness of the Venetian defenses, and upon his return to mainland Europe wrote several papers about siege warfare. He also continued his foreign military service, advising the Dutch army against the French.

Rimpler wrote about and designed a series of hypothetical fortifications, though these were often discarded by potential clients as too expensive. Rimpler notably favored casemate walls over ramparts, having seen the former's effectiveness at Candia, an increasingly unpopular viewpoint among his contemporaries. Rimpler was also a strong proponent of combining static defenses with more mobile units, believing that fortifications, land and sea units should be positioned so they could mutually support one another. Rimpler rarely wrote down his designs on paper, memorizing them instead, and was noted by contemporaries as being a more effective practical leader than a military theorist.

=== Siege of Vienna ===
Rimpler entered the service of the Imperial Army in the 1670s, managing fortifications in the Holy Roman Empire. At the recommendation of Louis William, Margrave of Baden-Baden, in 1681 Rimpler was appointed as Chief Engineer of the empire with the commissioned rank of Lieutenant Colonel and a salary of 2000 Florins a year. Amid rising tensions between Austria and the Ottoman Empire, Rimpler worked to fortify Austria's southern border against a potential Ottoman invasion. In keeping with his personal doctrine of combining static and mobile units, Rimpler planned to fortify key points on the Austrian border so that they could be supported by the Austrian army. The key to his defensive plan was the city of Raab (modern day Győr).

Following the outbreak of the Great Turkish War in 1682, Rimpler was put in charge of Vienna's fortifications under the overall command of Ernst Rüdiger von Starhemberg. In the summer of 1683, a large Ottoman army invaded Austria from the south. An Austrian army - under the command of Charles V, Duke of Lorraine - moved south to counter the Ottoman advance, but a contingent of Ottoman cavalry swam the Raab river; fearing the Ottomans would outflank his position, Charles retreated to Vienna, abandoning the heavily fortified Raab to be besieged by the Ottoman army. The Ottoman commander, Kara Mustafa Pasha, chose to pursue Charles, leaving a small army to besiege Raab and advancing unopposed towards Vienna.

With the road to Vienna open, Rimpler conducted a hurried campaign to prepare the city for a siege. Much of Vienna's defenses were older and outdated, and so Rimpler ordered the construction of firing points, entrenchments, and wooden palisades that could be built quickly. An expert on the Turkish style of siege warfare, Rimpler knew that the Ottoman army would be forced to storm the city (Vienna was unlikely to surrender given the Turkish terms) and so planned to wear the Ottoman forces down in a battle of attrition. The Turkish army slowly advanced towards Vienna, granting Rimpler more time to complete his defensive measures.

The Ottoman army arrived on 14 July and laid siege to Vienna for 60 days, bombarding the city with cannon and digging mines under its walls; from his experience at the siege of Candia, Rimpler knew that the latter would be the greater threat to the Viennese defenders, as they had very few means to counter mines. Rimpler commanded parts of the city's defenses until being mortally wounded by an Ottoman mine on 25 July, dying on either 2 or 3 August in a makeshift hospital.

=== Legacy ===
Rimpler's engineering legacy is mixed, with many of his contemporaries criticizing his designs as being overly complicated or expensive. A theory that one of his designs, the "Rimpler Angle", influenced 18th-century fortress design was embraced by some historians but remains in dispute. However, his military achievements were well respected, with some of his contemporaries praising his practical skill in battle and the energy with which he conducted his work.

A street in Vienna, Rimplergasse, is named for him.
