= Tobias Heller =

German politician (born 1986)

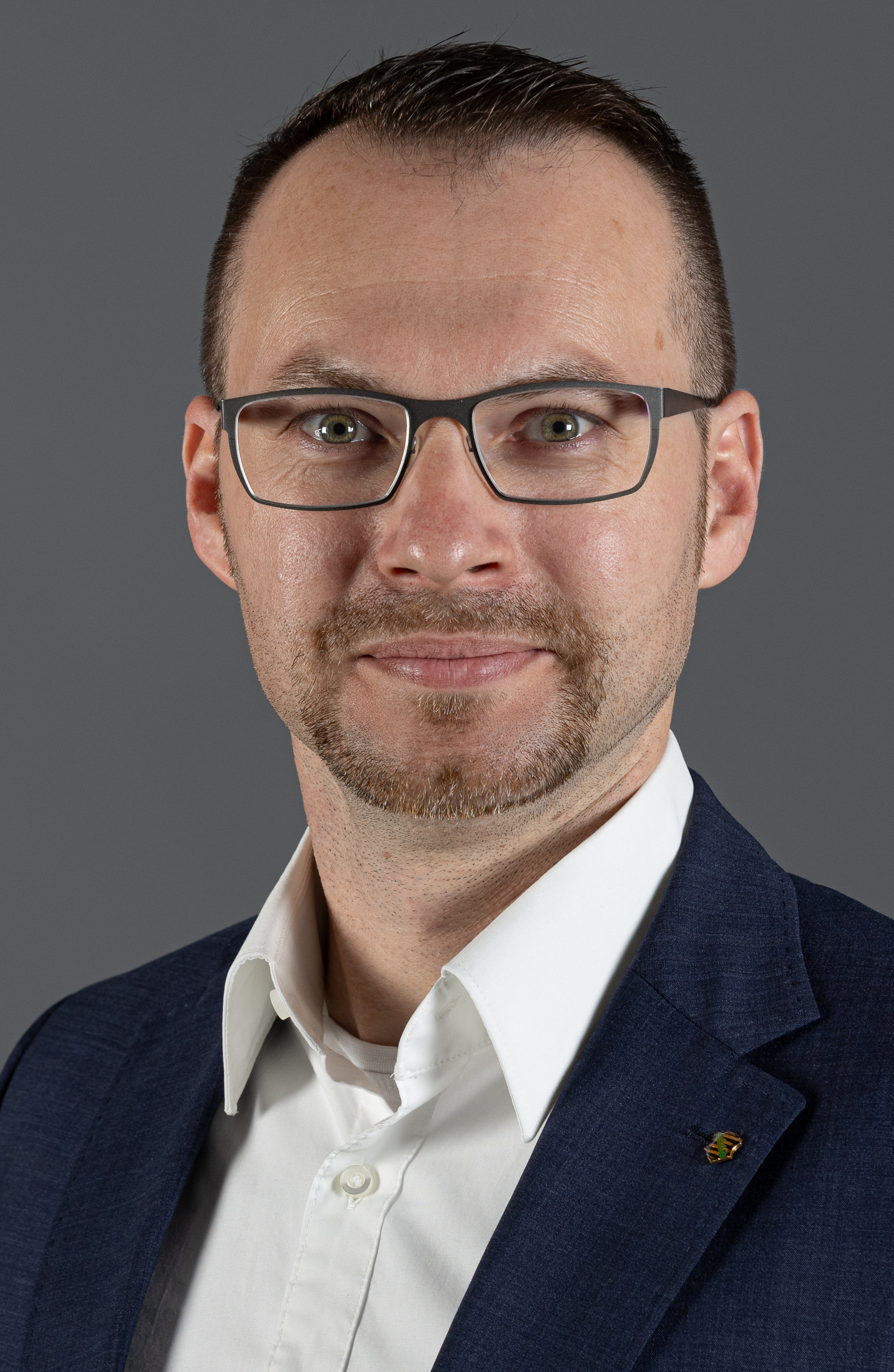
- Heller in 2025

Member of the Landtag of Saxony
- Incumbent
- Assumed office 1 October 2024
- Preceded by: Gudrun Petzold
- Constituency: Nordsachsen 3

Personal details
- Born: 1986 (age 39–40) Leisnig
- Party: Alternative for Germany

Tobias Heller (born 1986 in Leisnig) is a German politician serving as a member of the Landtag of Saxony since 2024. He has served as deputy chairman of the Alternative for Germany in Nordsachsen since 2020.
