= Bockelwitz =

- Ortsteil of Leisnig
- Interactive map of Bockelwitz
- Location within Germany Location within Saxony
- Coordinates: 51°11′55″N 12°57′21″E
- Country: Germany
- State: Saxony
- District: Mittelsachsen
- Town: Leisnig

Area
  - Total: 34.54 km^{2} (13.34 sq mi)
- Elevation: 229 m (751 ft)

Population (2010-12-31)
  - Total: 2,633
  - Density: 76.23/km^{2} (197.4/sq mi)
- Time zone: UTC+01:00 (CET)
  - Summer (DST): UTC+02:00 (CEST)
- Postal codes: 04703
- Dialling codes: 034321
- Vehicle registration: FG
- Website: www.bockelwitz.de

Bockelwitz is a former municipality in the district of Mittelsachsen, in Saxony, Germany. With effect from 1 January 2012, it has been incorporated into the town of Leisnig.

== History ==
The village of Bockelwitz is of Sorbian origin, as evidenced by the fact that as late as 1403 it was still required to deliver “Wachkorn” (a grain tithe) to the manor at Tragnitz—a levy likely imposed on all villages that had originated before the establishment of the Leisnig castle district. The village of Criscowe (Kreischau) has since been absorbed into Bockelwitz.

Bockelwitz was first mentioned in a document in 1245 in the charter of protection issued by Emperor Frederick II for Buch Abbey. The settlement had been a fief of the imperial ministeriales of Mildenstein, from whom it later passed to the abbey. Ecclesiastically, the village initially belonged to St. Matthew’s Church in Leisnig, and from 1286 to St. Nicholas’ Church in Altleisnig. Between 1286 and 1306, a filial church was likely built in Bockelwitz. In 1306, this church was elevated to the status of a parish church by the Bishop of Meissen, with the farmers obligated to compensate the priest of Altleisnig and to provide for the maintenance of their own pastor. The villages of Kreischau, Kroptewitz, Dobernitz, Leuterwitz, Nicollschwitz, Großpelsen, and Kleinpelsen were assigned to the new parish. The abbot of Buch Abbey remained the patron.

In 1378, Bockelwitz was required to deliver 44 scheffel (bushels) of grain and the same amount of oats, as well as one kitchen cow, annually to castrum Leisnig.
