= Mochau =

- Stadtteil of Döbeln
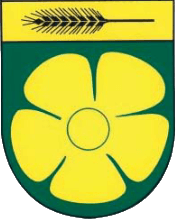
- Coat of arms
- Interactive map of Mochau
- Location within Germany Location within Saxony
- Coordinates: 51°7′N 13°10′E
- Country: Germany
- State: Saxony
- District: Mittelsachsen
- Town: Döbeln
- Subdivisions: 23

Area
  - Total: 38.82 km^{2} (14.99 sq mi)
- Elevation: 248 m (814 ft)

Population (2014-12-31)
  - Total: 2,311
  - Density: 59.53/km^{2} (154.2/sq mi)
- Time zone: UTC+01:00 (CET)
  - Summer (DST): UTC+02:00 (CEST)
- Postal codes: 04720
- Dialling codes: 03431 and 034325
- Vehicle registration: FG
- Website: www.mochau.de

Mochau is a former municipality in the district of Mittelsachsen, in Saxony, Germany. Since 1 January 2016 it is part of the town Döbeln.
