= Döbeln Hauptbahnhof =

Railway station in Döbeln, Germany

Döbeln Hbf
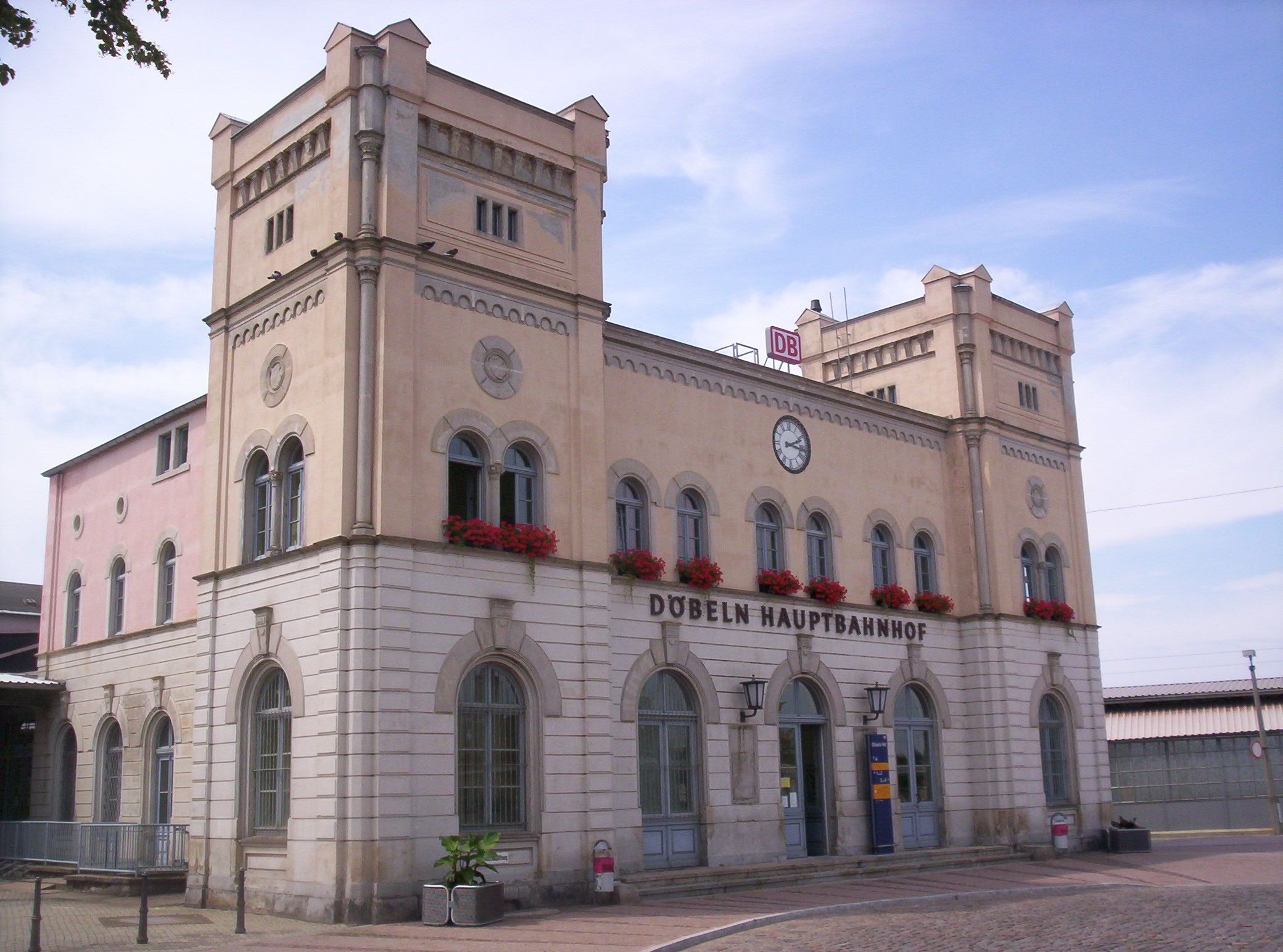
- The outside of the station building, built 1868

General information
- Location: Bahnhofstr. 25, Döbeln, Saxony; Germany
- Coordinates: 51°07′37″N 13°05′44″E
- Lines: Riesa–Chemnitz (KBS 520); Borsdorf–Coswig (KBS 506); Oschatz–Döbeln (narrow gauge; closed)
- Platforms: 4

Construction
- Accessible: No (low platforms)

Other information
- Station code: 1236
- DS100 code: DDE
- IBNR: 8010080
- Category: 5
- Fare zone: VMS: 50; MDV: 133 (VMS transitional tariff)
- Website: www.bahnhof.de

History
- Opened: 2 June 1868

Services
Preceding station	DB Fernverkehr	Following station
Chemnitz Hbf Terminus	IC 17	Riesa towards Warnemünde
Preceding station	Mitteldeutsche Regiobahn	Following station
Zschaitz towards Chemnitz Hbf	RB 45	Limmritz towards Elsterwerda
Westewitz-Hochweitzschen towards Leipzig Hbf	RB 110	Terminus
Location

Döbeln Hauptbahnhof is the largest station in Döbeln in the German state of Saxony. Now an unstaffed halt, it was built as a Keilbahnhof ("wedge-shaped station"). The station is listed by the rail authorities with the abbreviation of DDE.

The diesel-worked Borsdorf–Coswig and electrified Riesa–Chemnitz lines cross in Döbeln Hbf. From 1884 to 1964 Döbeln Hbf was also the terminus of the 750 mm gauge railway from Oschatz.

== History ==
Although Döbeln had already been connected to the Riesa-Chemnitz route since 1847 with the nearby Großbauchlitz station, this station was opened with the opening of the Döbeln–Leisnig section of the Borsdorf–Coswig railway 2 June 1868 as Station Döbeln, which "interimistically" had only a "passenger entrance shed". On 25 October 1868, the Döbeln Ost (east) station came into operation on the route to Meißen, and Döbeln station received the designation of Hauptbahnhof (main or central station). Two years later, on 1 January 1870, the wedge-shaped station was completed under the direction of the departmental engineer Bassenge with the present entrance building, which resembles the then station building of Zwickau station. The simple, functional building contained rooms for a post office, police and railway staff with baggage handling and three waiting rooms for first, second and third class. From 1 November 1884, the Oschatz–Mügeln–Döbeln narrow gauge railway also connected Döbeln station with the Wilsdruff network (Wilsdruffer Netz) by means of a branch from Gärtitz. The station received platform canopies in 1886.

Between 1892 and 1926 the Döbeln horse tramway (Döbelner Straßenbahn) connected the station and central Döbeln. Major changes to the station track layout resulted from extensions for locomotive and goods sheds in 1896. During the reconstruction in 1925 to plans by Mirus, the ground plan was only slightly modified. Passenger traffic on the narrow-gauge-line stopped on 15 December 1964.

== Long distance and regional transport ==
Döbeln Hauptbahnhof is currently served by the following services:

Line	Route	Frequency	Operator
IC 17	Rostock - Berlin - Elsterwerda – Riesa – Döbeln – Chemnitz	2 trains pairs	DB Fernverkehr
RB 45	Elsterwerda – Riesa – Döbeln – Chemnitz	60 (weekend: 120)	Bayerische Oberlandbahn
RB 110	Leipzig – Grimma – Döbeln	60 (weekend: 120)	Transdev Regio Ost
As of 29 April 2023
