= Riesa station =

Train station in Saxony, Germany

Riesa
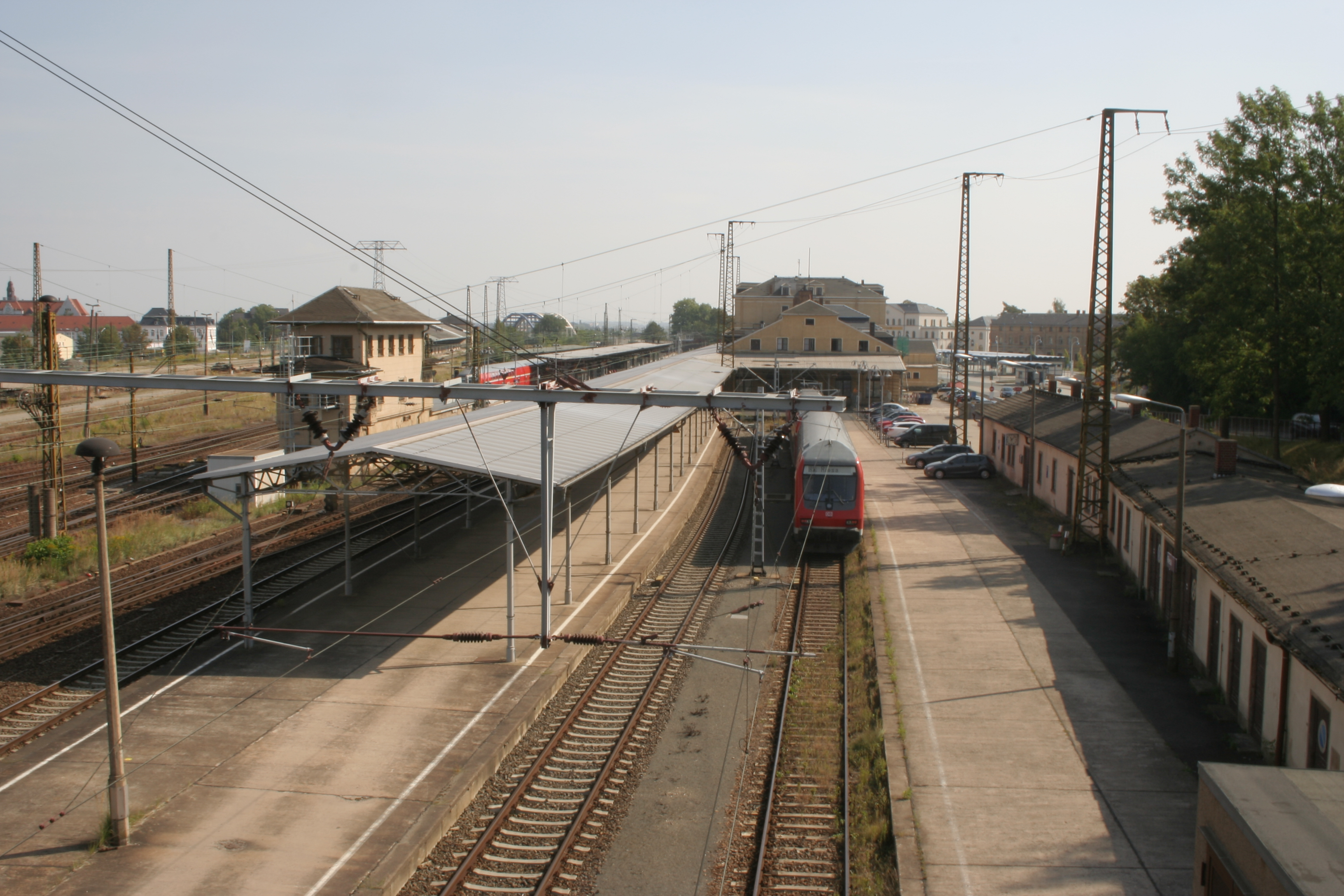
- Riesa railway station

General information
- Location: Bahnhofstr. 50, Riesa, Saxony; Germany
- Coordinates: 51°18′34″N 13°17′14″E
- Owner: Deutsche Bahn
- Operator: DB Station&Service
- Lines: Leipzig–Dresden railway (km 65.87); Riesa–Chemnitz railway (km -0.135); former Riesa–Nossen (km -0.18)
- Platforms: 10

Construction
- Accessible: Yes (except not normally used platforms 4 and 5)

Other information
- Station code: 5276
- DS100 code: DR
- IBNR: 8010297
- Category: 3
- Fare zone: VVO: 41
- Website: www.bahnhof.de

History
- Opened: 11 November 1838

Services
Preceding station	DB Fernverkehr	Following station
Leipzig Hbf towards Zürich HB	EC 12N	Dresden-Neustadt towards Praha hl.n.
Leipzig Hbf towards Wiesbaden Hbf	ICE 50	Dresden-Neustadt towards Dresden Hbf
Leipzig Hbf towards Stuttgart Hbf	IC 55	Dresden-Neustadt towards Dresden Hbf
Preceding station	DB Regio Südost	Following station
Oschatz towards Leipzig Hbf	RE 50	Glaubitz (Riesa) towards Dresden Hbf
Preceding station	Mitteldeutsche Regiobahn	Following station
Zeithain towards Chemnitz Hbf	RB 45	Seerhausen towards Elsterwerda
Location
- Location within Saxony Location within Germany Location within Europe

Riesa station is the only passenger station of the town of Riesa in the German state of Saxony. It is a regular stop for Intercity and Intercity-Express services. The station is located at kilometer 65.8 of the Leipzig–Dresden railway. In addition, it is at the beginning of the Riesa–Chemnitz railway and the disused Riesa–Nossen railway.

== History ==
The Leipzig-Dresden Railway Company (Leipzig-Dresdner Eisenbahn-Compagnie, LDE) opened Riesa station as part of the Oschatz–Riesa section of the Leipzig–Dresden railway in November 1838. The first station building was added in 1844.The Riesa–Chemnitz railway, which branched off to the south from the existing line, was opened in August 1847. At the same time a second station was built in Riesa with a separate entrance building. A direct connection was built between the two stations in 1867. A new unified station was built in Chemnitz between 1879 and 1881 in response to a demand from the Finance Ministry. The current railway station building was constructed as part of this work.

The station was connected to the nearby Riesa–Elsterwerda and the Riesa–Nossen railway lines in 1875 and 1877. The latter was officially closed in 2007, although passenger services had already been discontinued in 1998.

From 1889 to 1924, the station forecourt was the starting point of a metre-gauge horse-drawn tram that ran to the Rathausplatz (town hall square). Due to the hyperinflation in the Weimar Republic between 1914 and 1923, it was shut down and replaced by a bus service.

In May 1970, Riesa station was connected to the electric railway network with the electrification of the Leipzig–Dresden line. In the first half of the 1990s, a bypass was planned to the south of Riesa as part of the proposed upgrade of the Leipzig–Dresden railway. On 8 March 1995, this plan was discarded and an upgrade of the Riesa rail node (with speeds to be reduced as low as 100 km/h) was pursued instead. In the same year it was decided to establish a platform for long-distance services in Riesa. The development of the station forms part of the third stage of German Unity Transport Project (Verkehrsprojektes Deutsche Einheit) no. 9, which was approved in 2004.

The last pair of InterRegio services, running between Berlin and Chemnitz, used stop in Riesa until this services was cancelled by Deutsche Bahn in mid 2006. After that, this route was operated once a day as the Vogtland-Express by Vogtlandbahn, which is now owned by Netinera. Vogtlandbahn replaced this service by a long-distance bus service in 2012.

== Infrastructure ==
The passenger station is located between the freight yard to the west and the bridge over the Elbe to the east. It has five through platform tracks (1–5) and five terminal platform tracks (1a and 6–9). But the only platform tracks regularly used by passengers are tracks 1–4 and 6. The bus station is served by several municipal and regional bus services operated by Verkehrsgesellschaft Meißen (VGM), the municipal transport company.

== Train services ==
In the 2026 timetable, the following services stop at the station:

Line	Route	Interval (min)	Operator
ICE 50	Dresden – Riesa – Leipzig – Erfurt – Eisenach – Fulda – Frankfurt – Mainz – Wiesbaden	120	DB Fernverkehr
IC 55	Dresden – Riesa – Leipzig – Halle – Magdeburg – Braunschweig – Hannover – Dortmund – Cologne – Bonn – Mainz – Mannheim – Heidelberg – Stuttgart (– Tübingen)	120	DB Fernverkehr
RE 50	Dresden – Radebeul Ost – Priestewitz – Riesa – Oschatz – Wurzen – Leipzig	60	DB Regio Südost
RB 45	(Zwickau–) Chemnitz – Mittweida – Döbeln – Riesa – Elsterwerda	60 (Mon–Fri); 120 (Sat–Sun)	Mitteldeutsche Regiobahn
