= Georg Altner =

German Nazi politician and police official (1901–1945)

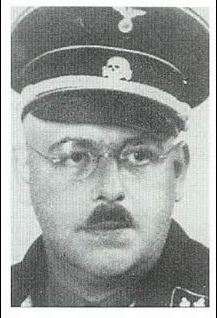
- Altner, c. 1934

Police President, Dortmund
- In office 14 January 1942 – 12 April 1945

Police President, Plauen
- In office 22 September 1938 – 14 January 1942

Reichstag deputy
- In office 12 November 1933 – 12 April 1945

Landtag of Prussia deputy
- In office 5 March 1933 – 14 October 1933

Personal details
- Born: Ernst Georg Altner; 4 December 1901 Waldheim, Kingdom of Saxony, German Empire
- Died: 12 April 1945 (aged 43) Dortmund, Nazi Germany
- Cause of death: Suicide by gunshot
- Occupation: Machinist
- Civilian awards: Golden Party Badge

Military service
- Allegiance: Nazi Germany
- Branch/service: German Army
- Years of service: 1935–1945
- Rank: Oberleutnant
- Battles/wars: Battle of France
- Military awards: Iron Cross, 2nd class War Merit Cross, 1st and 2nd class Wound Badge

Ernst Georg Altner (4 December 1901 – 12 April 1945) was a German Nazi Party politician and an SS-Brigadeführer. He was a member of the Reichstag throughout the duration of Nazi Germany. He also served as the police president in Plauen and in Dortmund. Toward the end of World War II in Europe when Dortmund fell to the US Army, he died by suicide.

== Early life ==
Altner was born in Waldheim, Saxony, the son of a senior prison guard. From 1908, he attended the local Volksschule and Realgymnasium until 1917. Between 1917 and 1919, he completed an apprenticeship as a factory machinist and, at the same time, attended the Hochschule Mittweida, a university of applied sciences, which he left without graduating. In March, 1920, he took part in the Kapp Putsch against the government of the Weimar Republic as a member of the local citizen's militia. In 1919 and 1920, he worked as a metal worker and lathe operator in Waldheim. From 1921 to 1933, he was employed as a construction manager in civil engineering in Halle.

== Nazi Party and SS career ==
Between 1922 and 1925, Altner was a member of Der Stahlhelm, the right-wing German veterans organization. He joined the Nazi Party in April 1926 (membership number 34,339). As an early Party member, he later would be awarded the Golden Party Badge. He became the propaganda leader and press officer for Party Bezirk (district) of Rochlitz-Colditz in Gau Saxony. He also joined the Sturmabteilung (SA), the Nazi paramilitary organization, as an SA-Truppführer in 1925. He was promoted to SA-Sturmführer in early 1929, leading the 26th SA-Sturm. On 10 May 1929, he transferred from the SA to the Schutzstaffel (SS number 1,421). He was commissioned as an SS-Sturmführer on 1 July 1931. Promoted to SS-Sturmbannführer on 15 November 1931, he was given the command of the 26th SS-Standarte in Halle and promoted to SS-Standartenführer on 24 December 1932.

Following the Nazi seizure of power, Altner was named the Führer of SS-Abschnitt (district) XVI in Halle on 22 July 1933. He was promoted to SS-Oberführer on 9 November 1933 before moving to the command of SS-Abschnitt VII in Königsberg on 20 March 1934. From 23 February to 1 May 1935, he served as the chief of staff at SS-Oberabschnitt (upper district) Nordöst in Königsberg. He next was transferred to become the chief of staff at SS-Oberabschnitt Südwest in Stuttgart where he served until 16 May 1938. Transferred to SS-Oberabschnitt West in Düsseldorf for police training, Altner was named police president of Plauen on 22 September 1938 and also was given command of the local Kripo (criminal police). He was also assigned to the Sicherheitsdienst (SD) Main Office on 5 December 1938, which became part of the Reich Security Main Office (RSHA) on 1 October 1, 1939.

In addition to his career in the SS, Altner also was politically active. After the Nazi seizure of power, he was appointed to the Landtag of Prussia from 5 March to 14 October 1933 when it was dissolved by the Nazis. On 12 November 1933, he was elected as a Reichstag deputy from electoral constituency 11 (Merseburg). At the 1936 election, he switched to constituency 31 (Württemberg) and retained that seat until his death.

== Wartime military service and death ==
From 1935, Altner was also a member of the German Army and, by 1940, had been promoted to Oberleutnant in the reserves. After the outbreak of the Second World War, he took part in the Battle of France in May 1940 as the leader of a pioneer company, and was seriously wounded on 15 June 1940. He was awarded the Iron Cross second class, the War Merit Cross, first and second class with swords, and the Wound Badge in black.

Returning to his police duties in Plauen, Altner was transferred to the Dortmund police headquarters at the end of 1941, and was appointed police president and head of the local Kripo on 14 January 1942. In March, he was promoted to SS-Brigadeführer and Generalmajor of police with an effective date of 1 January 1942 and remained in this post for the next few years. When the US Army attacked and occupied the city, he shot himself in Dortmund's Rombergpark.

== SS and police ranks ==
SA, SS and police ranks
Date	Rank
1925	SA-Truppführer
1929	SA-Sturmführer
10 May 1929	SS-Mann
30 April 1931	SS-Truppführer
1 July 1931	SS-Sturmführer
15 November 1931	SS-Sturmbannführer
24 December 1932	SS-Standartenführer
9 November 1933	SS-Oberführer
1 January 1942	SS-Brigadeführer and Generalmajor of police

== Sources ==
- Information about Georg Altner in the Reichstag database
- Schiffer Publishing Ltd., ed. (2000). SS Officers List: SS-Standartenführer to SS-Oberstgruppenführer (As of 30 January 1942). Schiffer Military History Publishing. ISBN 0-7643-1061-5.
- "SS-Brigadeführer Ernst Georg Altner". Archived from the original on 8 November 2017.
- Yerger, Mark C. (1997). The Allgemeine-SS: The Commands, Units and Leaders of the General SS. Schiffer Publishing Ltd. ISBN 0-7643-0145-4.
