= Leisnig =

- Town
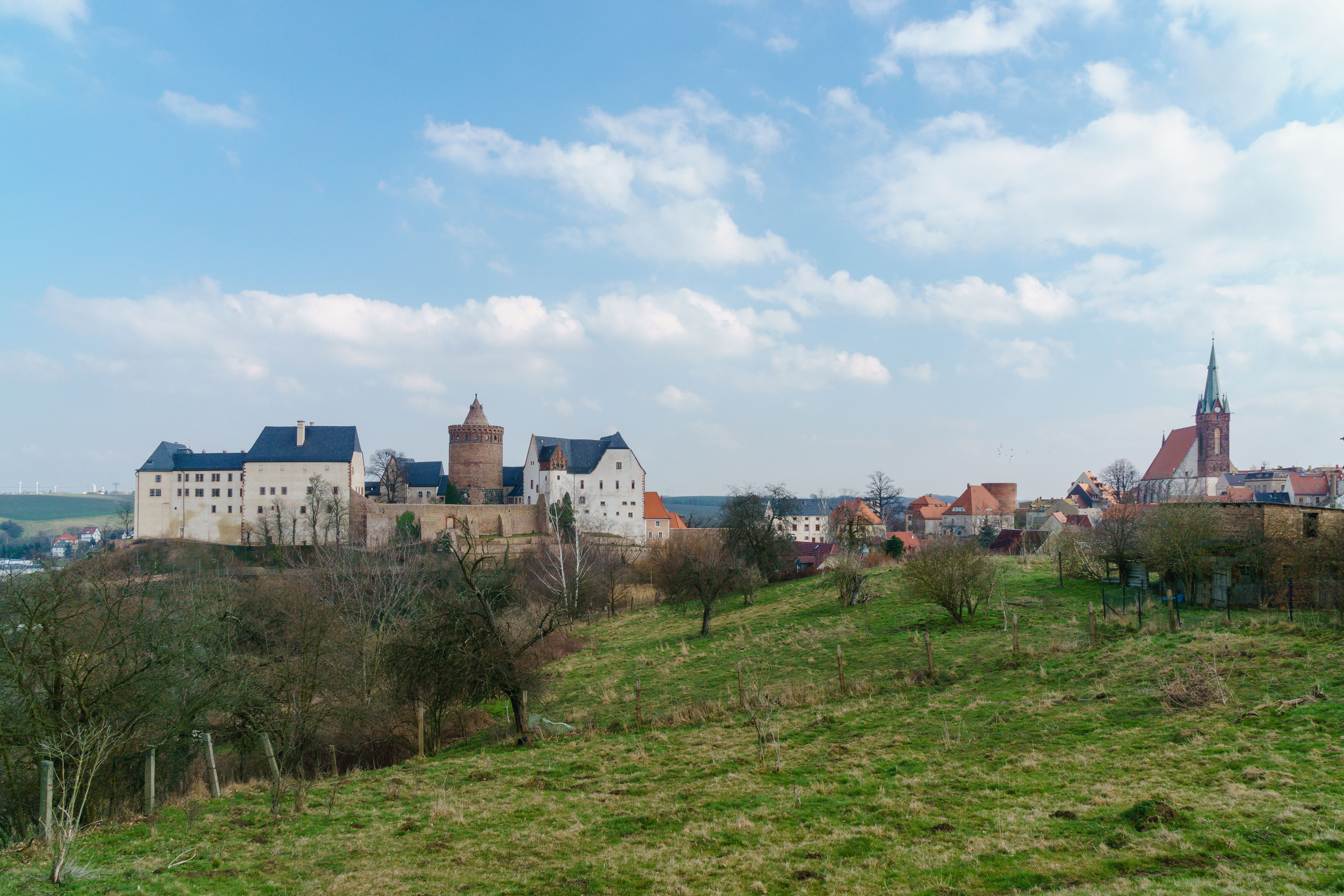
- Skyline of Leisnig, Mildenstein Castle to the left

- Coat of arms

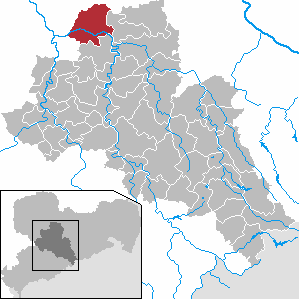
- Location of Leisnig within Mittelsachsen district
- Interactive map of Leisnig
- Location within Germany Location within Saxony
- Coordinates: 51°10′N 12°55′E
- Country: Germany
- State: Saxony
- District: Mittelsachsen
- Subdivisions: 40

Government
  - Mayor (2022–29): Carsten Graf

Area
  - Total: 78.08 km^{2} (30.15 sq mi)
- Elevation: 161 m (528 ft)

Population (2025-12-31)
  - Total: 7,864
  - Density: 100.7/km^{2} (260.9/sq mi)
- Time zone: UTC+01:00 (CET)
  - Summer (DST): UTC+02:00 (CEST)
- Postal codes: 04703
- Dialling codes: 034321
- Vehicle registration: FG
- Website: www.leisnig.de

Leisnig (German pronunciation: [ˈlaɪsnɪç]; Upper Sorbian: Lěsnik, pronounced [ˈlʲɪsnʲik]) is a small town in the district of Mittelsachsen, in the free state of Saxony in Germany, 50 kilometers southeast of Leipzig.

== History ==
A settlement in this location was first mentioned in 1046. The town features Mildenstein Castle which is over 1000 years old. The house Markt 13 shows the coat of arms of the Apian family.

Leisnig was Friedrich Olbricht's birthplace. In 1944, he was involved in the 20 July Plot to assassinate Adolf Hitler, and was executed for his participation in it.

The former municipality Bockelwitz became a part of the town of Leisnig in 2012.

== Points of interest ==
- Arktisch-Alpiner Pflanzengarten und Alpine Staudengärtnerei, a botanical garden
- Mildenstein Castle

=== Museums ===
The museum at Mildenstein Castle was founded in 1890 by the Leisnig Historical and Antiquarian Society. In addition to an exhibition on the history of the castle, which includes important finds such as Bohemian glasses from the 14th century, there are also newly established exhibitions on the penal system and the Leisnig office. In the boot museum on the outer bailey, inaugurated in 2006, the town's landmark, the Leisnig Giant Boot, is exhibited. In the town hall a small gallery is maintained with exhibitions that change several times a year.

== Notable people ==
- Johann von Staupitz (1465–1524), theologian, confessor of Martin Luther
- Peter Apian (1495–1552), mathematician, cartographer, geographer and astronomer
- Georg Rimpler (1636–1683), military engineer and author
- Friedrich Olbricht (1888–1944), one of the leading figures in connection with the assassination against Adolf Hitler July 1944
- Lothar Voigtländer (1943–2026), composer
- Beate Schramm (born 1966), rower
- Kerstin Behrendt (born 1967), athlete
- Sven Liebhauser (born 1981), politician
- Tobias Heller (born 1986), politician
