= Sven Liebhauser =

German politician (born 1981)

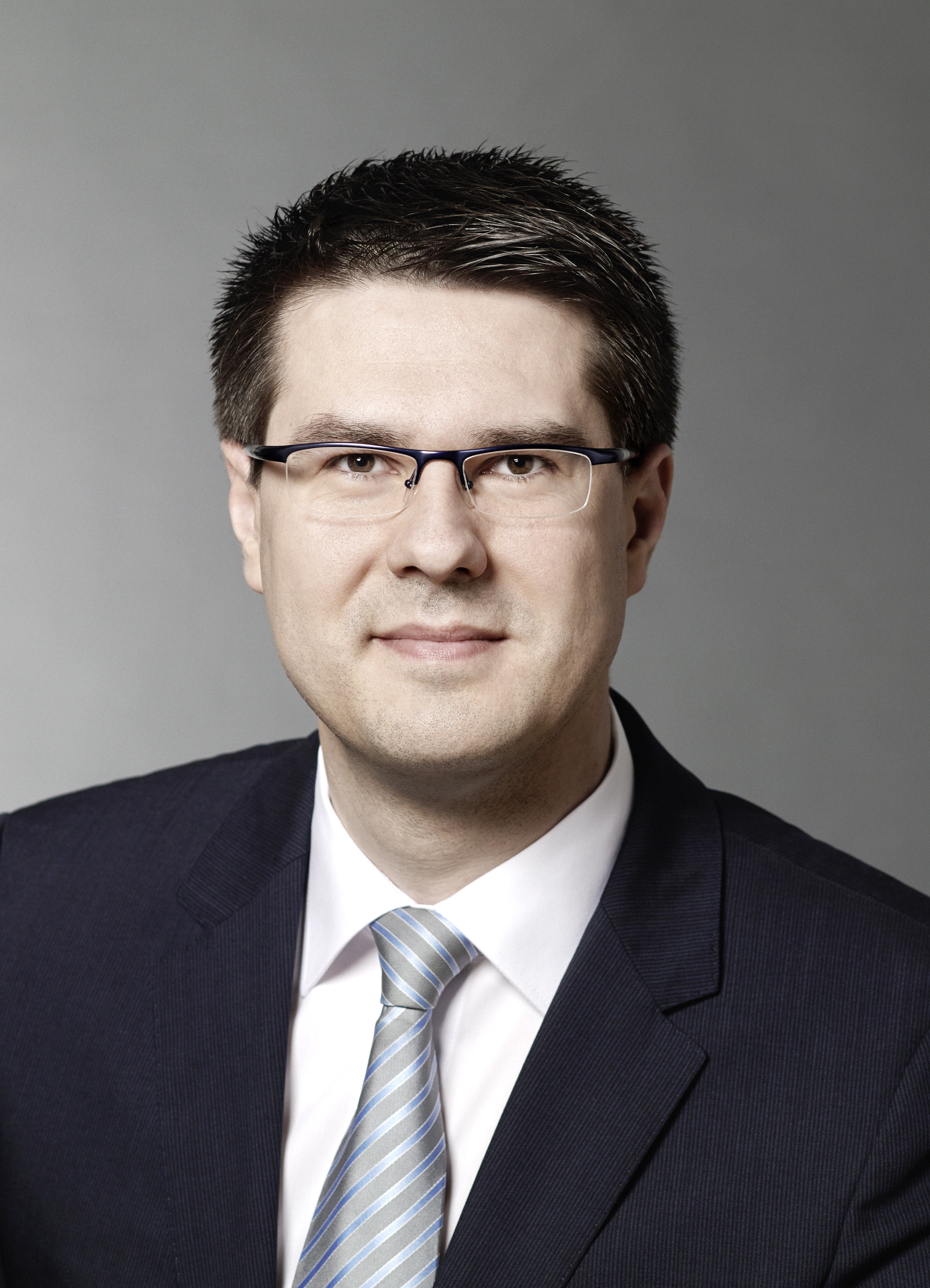
- Liebhauser in 2019

Member of the Landtag of Saxony
- In office 29 September 2009 – 31 July 2019
- Preceded by: Wolfgang Pfeifer
- Succeeded by: Carmen Krüger
- Constituency: Mittelsachsen 4

Personal details
- Born: 12 October 1981 (age 44) Leisnig
- Party: Christian Democratic Union of Germany

Sven Liebhauser (born 12 October 1981 in Leisnig) is a German politician serving as mayor of Döbeln since 2019. From 2009 to 2019, he was a member of the Landtag of Saxony.
