= Riesa–Chemnitz railway =

Railway in Saxony, Germany

Riesa–Döbeln–Chemnitz
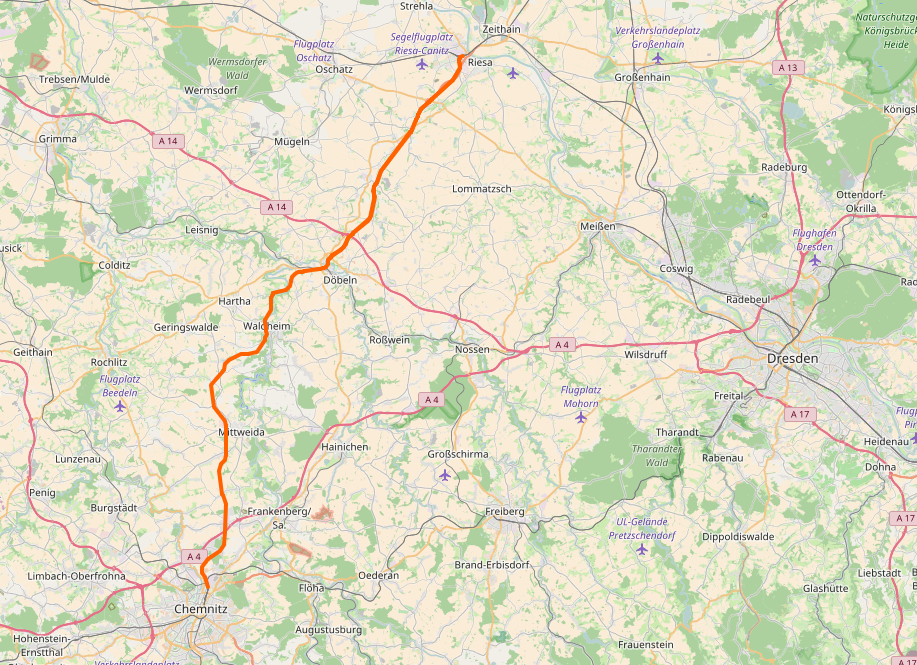

Overview
- Line number: 6265
- Locale: Saxony, Germany

Service
- Route number: 520

Technical
- Line length: 66.03 km (41.03 mi)
- Number of tracks: 2
- Track gauge: 1,435 mm (4 ft 8 1/2 in) standard gauge
- Minimum radius: 300 m (984 ft)
- Electrification: 15 kV/16.7 Hz AC overhead catenary
- Operating speed: 140 km/h (87.0 mph) (maximum)
- Maximum incline: 1.0%

The Chemnitz–Riesa railway is a two-track and electrified mainline railway in the German state of Saxony, originally built and operated by the Chemnitz-Riesa Railway Company. The line was opened between 1847 and 1852 and is one of the oldest railways in Germany. The line runs from Riesa via Döbeln to Chemnitz and is part of the Berlin–Chemnitz route.

== History ==
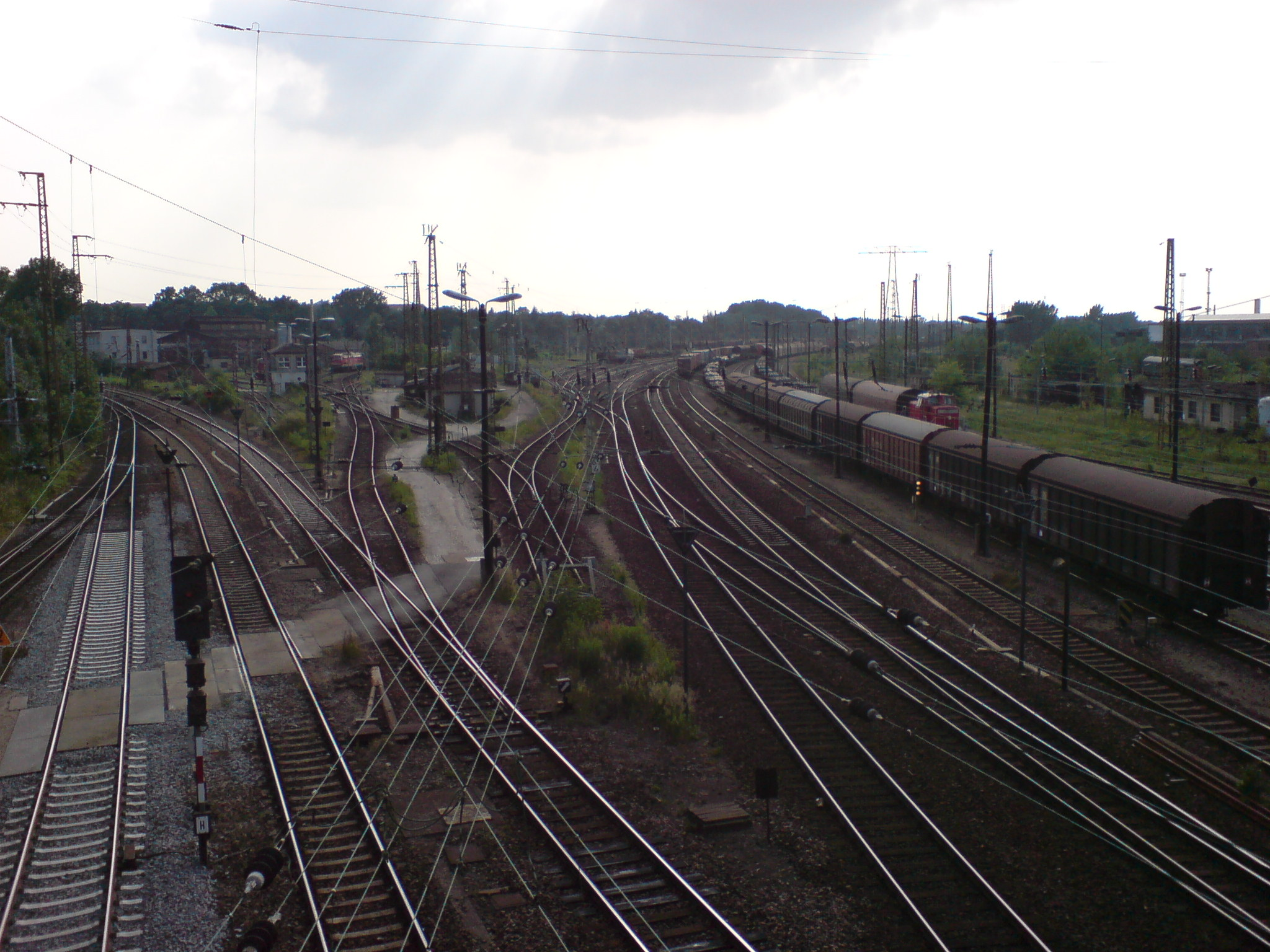
Riesa station

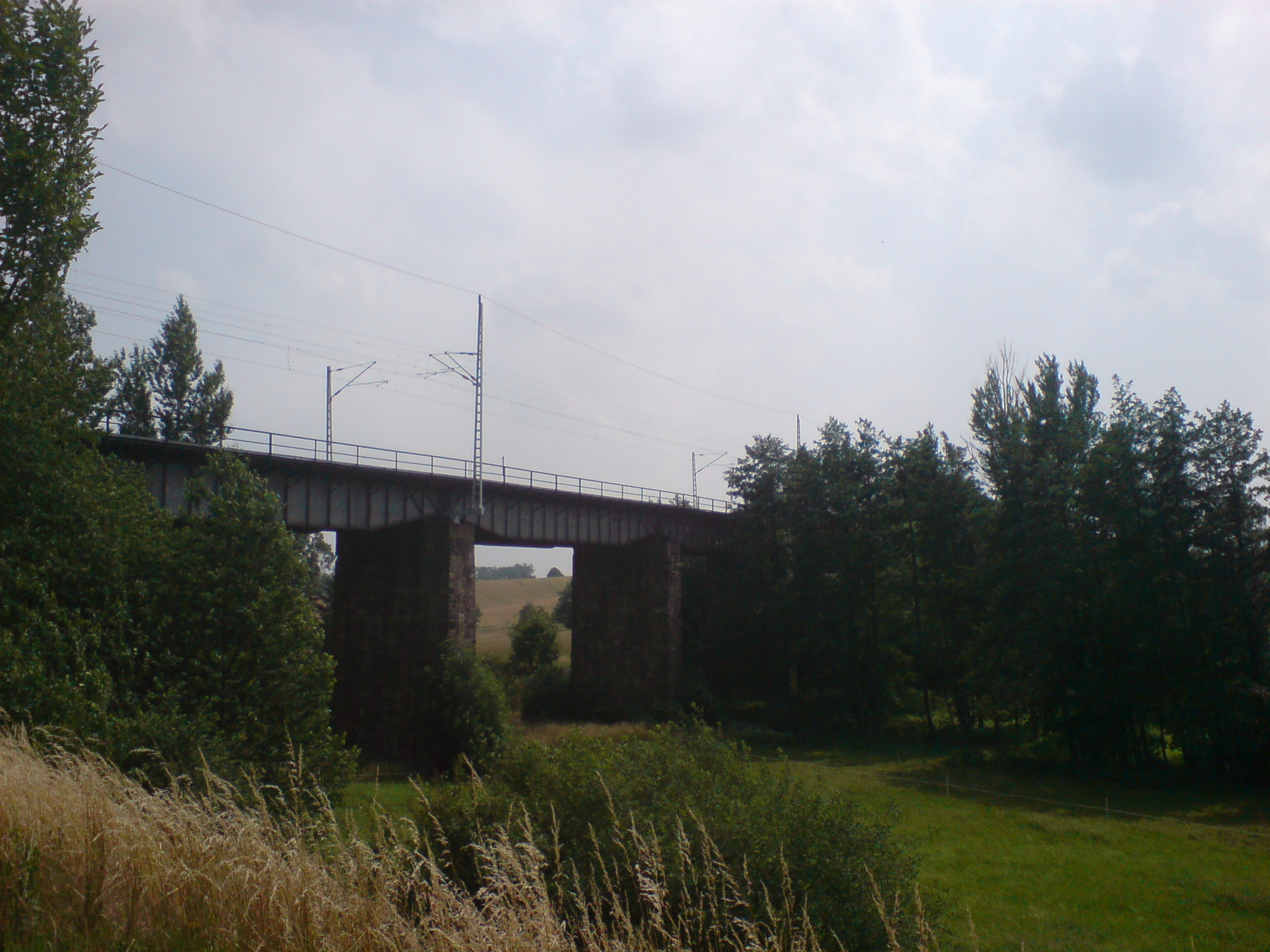
The steel bridge at Ostrau

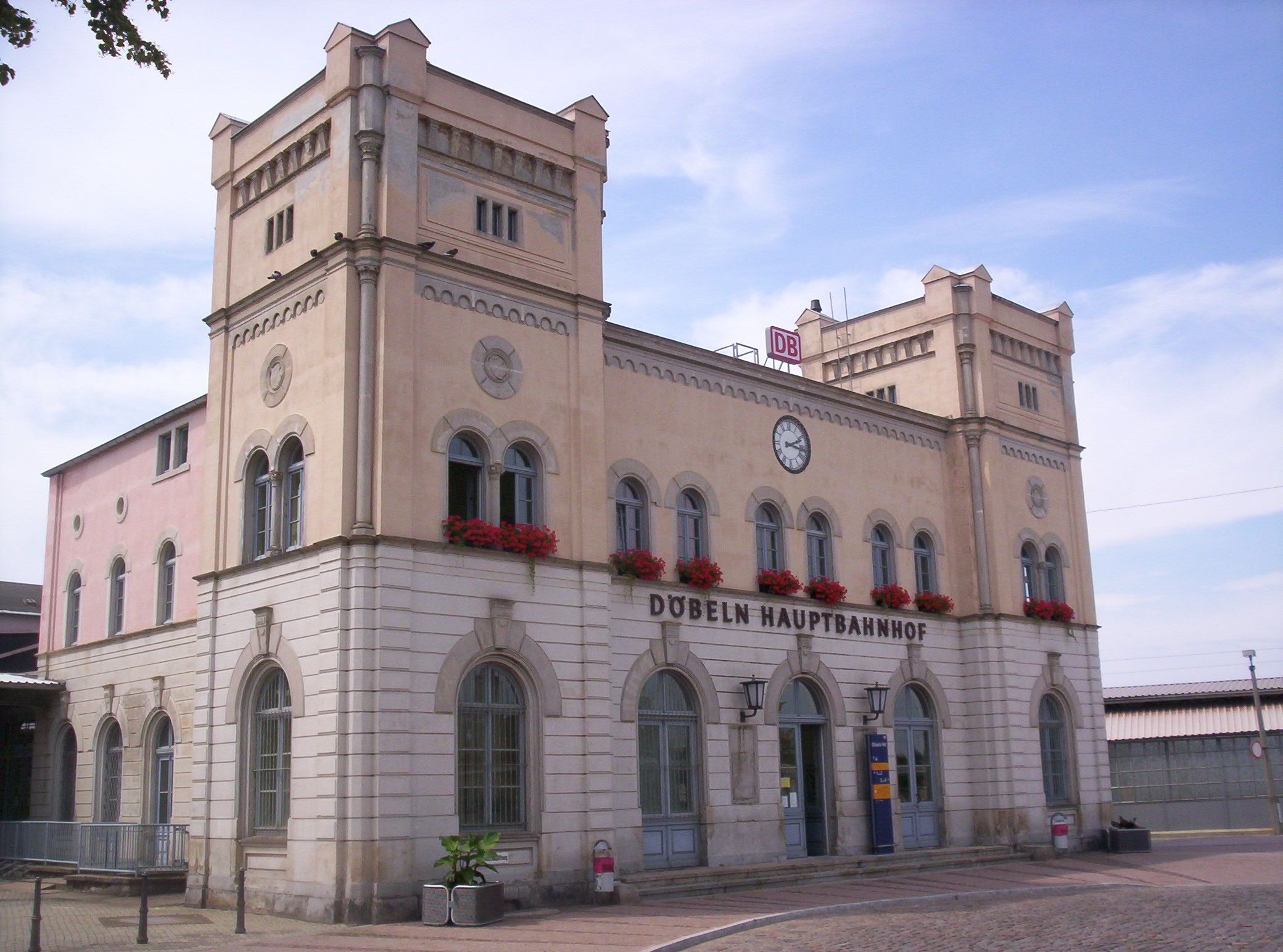
Döbeln Hauptbahnhof, opened 1868

In 1837, plans were submitted for a rail link from Riesa, a major freight hub on the Elbe river, to Chemnitz and on to Zwickau, which was significant as a coal-producing region. After the Leipzig–Dresden railway was opened, connecting the industrial city of Chemnitz to Leipzig and Dresden, even if it involved a detour via Riesa, was given the highest priority. On 9 May 1845 construction started and progressed rapidly on the northern section from Riesa to Döbeln. The line was officially opened on 30 August 1847 and on 22 September 1847 it was extended a short distance to Limmritz. Döbeln initially only had a station in the northern district of Großbauchlitz. The current Döbeln Hauptbahnhof was only opened in its present position after the completion of the Dresden–Döbeln–Leipzig line in 1868.

Construction of the section from Limmritz to Waldheim presented major problems. Although work began in 1845, the cost of building viaducts, retaining walls and earthworks in the Zschopau valley quickly put the company into financial distress. Already in 1845 strikes began to occur due to the lack of payment of wages to workers; the revolution of 1848 further complicated construction. As of the line could not be operated profitable without a continuous line to Chemnitz and a loan could not be raised, the Chemnitz-Riesa Railway Company (German: Chemnitz-Riesaer Eisenbahn-Gesellschaft) asked to be taken over by the state in 1848. This took place on 31 December 1850 and the company continued construction, so that finally, on 1 September 1852, the whole line could be opened. Even now, the Limmritz–Waldheim section is known as the Bankrottmeile ("bankruptcy mile"; note that the northern German mile was 7532.5 metres long).

A line from Chemnitz to Zwickau was opened as planned by the Ore Mountains Railway Company (Erzgebirgischen Eisenbahn-Gesellschaft) in 1858 (with a branch extending from Glauchau to Gößnitz); as a result the line became known as the Lower Ore Mountains State Railway (Niedererzgebirgischen Staatsbahn). The line now connected not only to the Saxon-Bavarian State Railway (Sächsisch-Baiersche Eisenbahn-Compagnie), but also to the Upper Ore Mountains State Railway (Obererzgebirgischen Staatsbahn) between Zwickau and Schwarzenberg, Saxony, which also opened in 1858. On 1 January 1859 these lines were named the Western State Railways (Westlichen Staatsbahn).

In the Austro-Prussian War of 1866, the Ostrau viaduct was demolished by Prussian pioneers. Großbauchlitz (Döbeln Nord since 1932) station was connected in 1905 by a 1 km-long trolleybus-like system for freight from Günther's flour mill; it was replaced in 1914 by a siding. The biggest turning point in the line's history occurred after 1945. Reparations to the Soviet Union led to the complete dismantling of the second track, which made operating during the next 45 years very difficult on this heavily trafficked mainline route. The second track was restored to operations only in 1990. Prior to the electrification of 1991, the roofs of two "artificial" tunnels (which were built in the early years of the line to avoid rock falls and snow drifts) were removed.

== Route ==
In Riesa station the line branches off along with the branch line to Nossen from the Leipzig–Dresden line. The line to Nossen branches off the left and runs to the south, while the Chemnitz line runs to the south-west and passes over highway B 169. The northern section runs through relatively flat land until the Döbeln area; the only significant engineering works on this section is the 130 m-long viaduct near Ostrava and the 80 m-long bridge over the Mulde outside Döbeln station. Near the Döbeln-Nord motorway junction, it crosses the A 14, and after crossing the Freiberger Mulde it runs to the now single-track and non-electrified main line from Coswig via Borsdorf to Leipzig. Döbeln Hauptbahnhof is built at the junction of two lines as a V-shaped station. The station building is located between the tracks from Riesa and Meissen.

South of Döbeln Hauptbahnhof, the Borsdorf–Coswig line branches off to the west and the line then crosses highways B 169 and B 175. The line enters the valley of the Zschopau near Limmritz. The section from Limmritz to Waldheim has the greatest concentration of engineering works on the entire route. Since as a result of the construction of this section, the Chemnitz-Riesa railway company went bankrupt and had to be taken over by the state, it is commonly known even today as the "bankruptcy mile". The line crosses the 14 arches of the 270 m-long and 32-m high Limmritz viaduct over the Zschopau. Immediately afterwards it used to pass through the 128 m-long Saalbach tunnel, which had its roof removed in 1991 in preparations for the line's electrification. The line then follows a steep and rocky slope along the left bank of the river, which it crosses on the 49 m-high, 210 m-long Diedenmühle Bridge over Steinaer Bach (stream), which here flows in a deep valley to the Zschopau. In Waldheim station, the disused line from Rochlitz branched off to the west until its closure in 1997.

South of Waldheim station the line used to run through the 170-metre-long Pfaffenberg tunnel, which was also had its roof removed prior to the electrification of the line. The line then crosses the Zschopau again on the 41 m-high and 211 m-long Heiligenborn viaduct. East of the viaduct is a 28 m-high and 165 m-long steel girder bridge of the abandoned freight railway to Kriebethal near Kriebstein. The Chemnitz line turns slightly toward the southwest, away from the Kriebstein line (which runs on a more southerly course) and the Zschopau to reach its westernmost point just before Eger. It then runs fairly directly to the south to Mittweida, Altmittweida and Oberlichtenau, where it crosses the A 4. This bridge was replaced completely as part of the upgrade of the A 4 at the end of the 1990s to six lanes. On its way to its southern end at Chemnitz Hauptbahnhof, the line is joined by the Dresden–Werdau line from the east and the line from Leipzig from the west.

== Services ==
A Regionalbahn service (RB 45) runs on the Elsterwerda–Riesa–Chemnitz hourly. It used to be operated by DB Regio until mid-June 2016 mainly with class 143 locomotives, hauling two double-deck carriages. Since 12 June 2016 those services are operated by Mitteldeutsche Regiobahn with Alstom Coradia Continental electric multiple units. Additional suburban services are run between Mittweida and Chemnitz by City-Bahn Chemnitz.

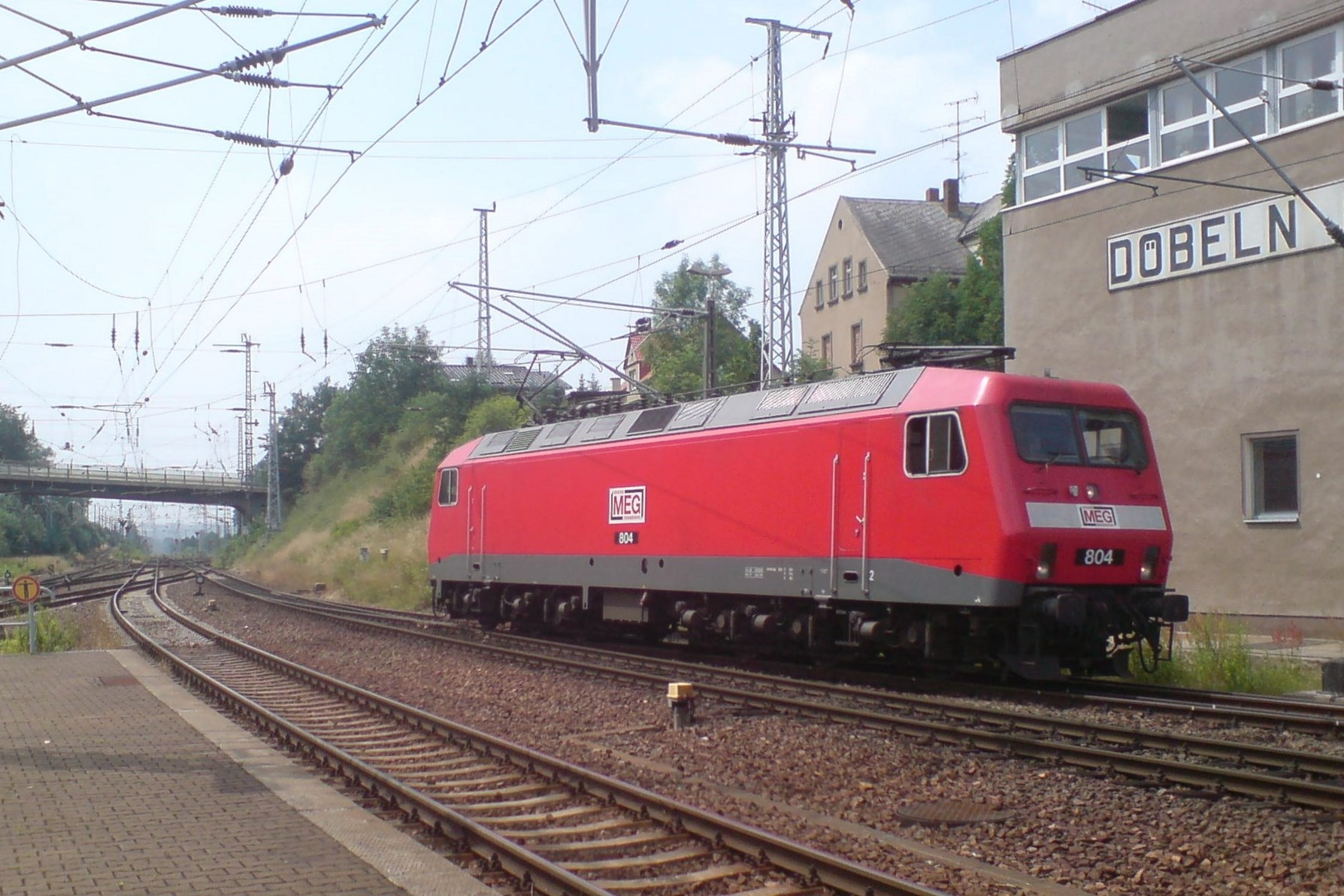
Mitteldeutsche Eisenbahn locomotive in Döbeln Hauptbahnhof

There are also freight transport on the line, particularly coal trains to Chemnitz and Mitteldeutsche Eisenbahn tanker trains on the section between Riesa and Döbeln Hauptbahnhof.
