= Ziegra-Knobelsdorf =

- Interactive map of Ziegra-Knobelsdorf
- Location within Germany Location within Saxony
- Coordinates: 51°5′30″N 13°4′30″E
- Country: Germany
- State: Saxony
- District: Mittelsachsen
- Disbanded: 1 January 2013
- Subdivisions: 16

Area
  - Total: 30.89 km^{2} (11.93 sq mi)
- Elevation: 249 m (817 ft)

Population (2011-12-31)
  - Total: 2,143
  - Density: 69.38/km^{2} (179.7/sq mi)
- Time zone: UTC+01:00 (CET)
  - Summer (DST): UTC+02:00 (CEST)
- Postal codes: 04720
- Dialling codes: 03431
- Vehicle registration: FG

Ziegra-Knobelsdorf (German pronunciation: [ˈtsiːɡʁa ˈknoːbl̩sˌdɔʁf]) is a former municipality in the district of Mittelsachsen, in Saxony, Germany. It has been dissolved with effect from 1 January 2013. The villages of Forchheim, Kleinlimmritz, Limmritz, Poschwitz, Schweta, Stockhausen, Töpeln, Wöllsdorf and Ziegra have been incorporated into Döbeln, Gebersbach, Heyda, Kaiserburg, Knobelsdorf, Meinsberg, Neuhausen and Rudelsdorf into Waldheim.
