= Waldheim, Saxony =

Waldheim
- Town
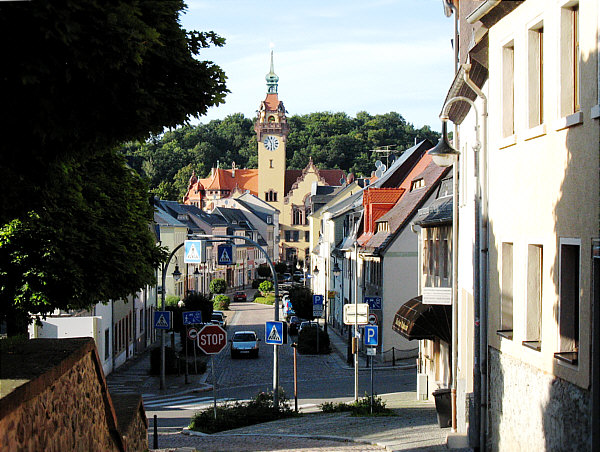
- Town center

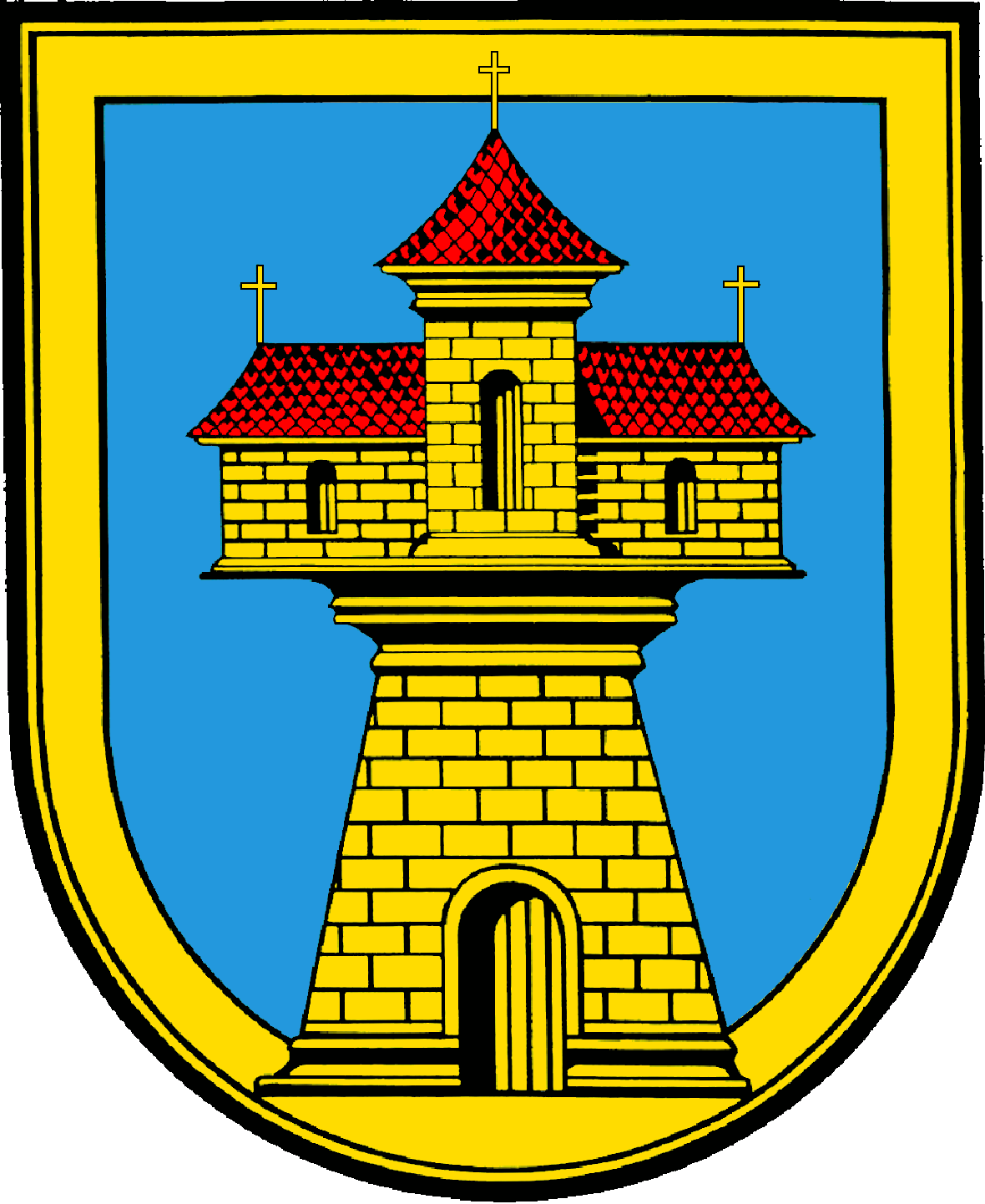
- Coat of arms

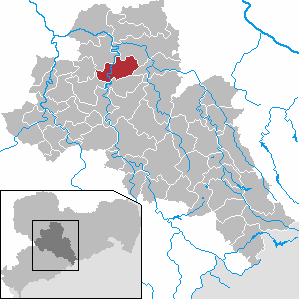
- Location of Waldheim within Mittelsachsen district
- Interactive map of Waldheim
- Location within Germany Location within Saxony
- Coordinates: 51°4′N 13°1′E
- Country: Germany
- State: Saxony
- District: Mittelsachsen
- Subdivisions: 5

Government
  - Mayor (2022–29): Steffen Ernst

Area
  - Total: 41.71 km^{2} (16.10 sq mi)
- Elevation: 266 m (873 ft)

Population (2025-12-31)
  - Total: 8,724
  - Density: 209.2/km^{2} (541.7/sq mi)
- Time zone: UTC+01:00 (CET)
  - Summer (DST): UTC+02:00 (CEST)
- Postal codes: 04736
- Dialling codes: 034327
- Vehicle registration: FG
- Website: www.stadt-waldheim.de

Waldheim (German pronunciation: [ˈvalthaɪm]) is a town in Mittelsachsen district, in Saxony, Germany.

== Geography ==
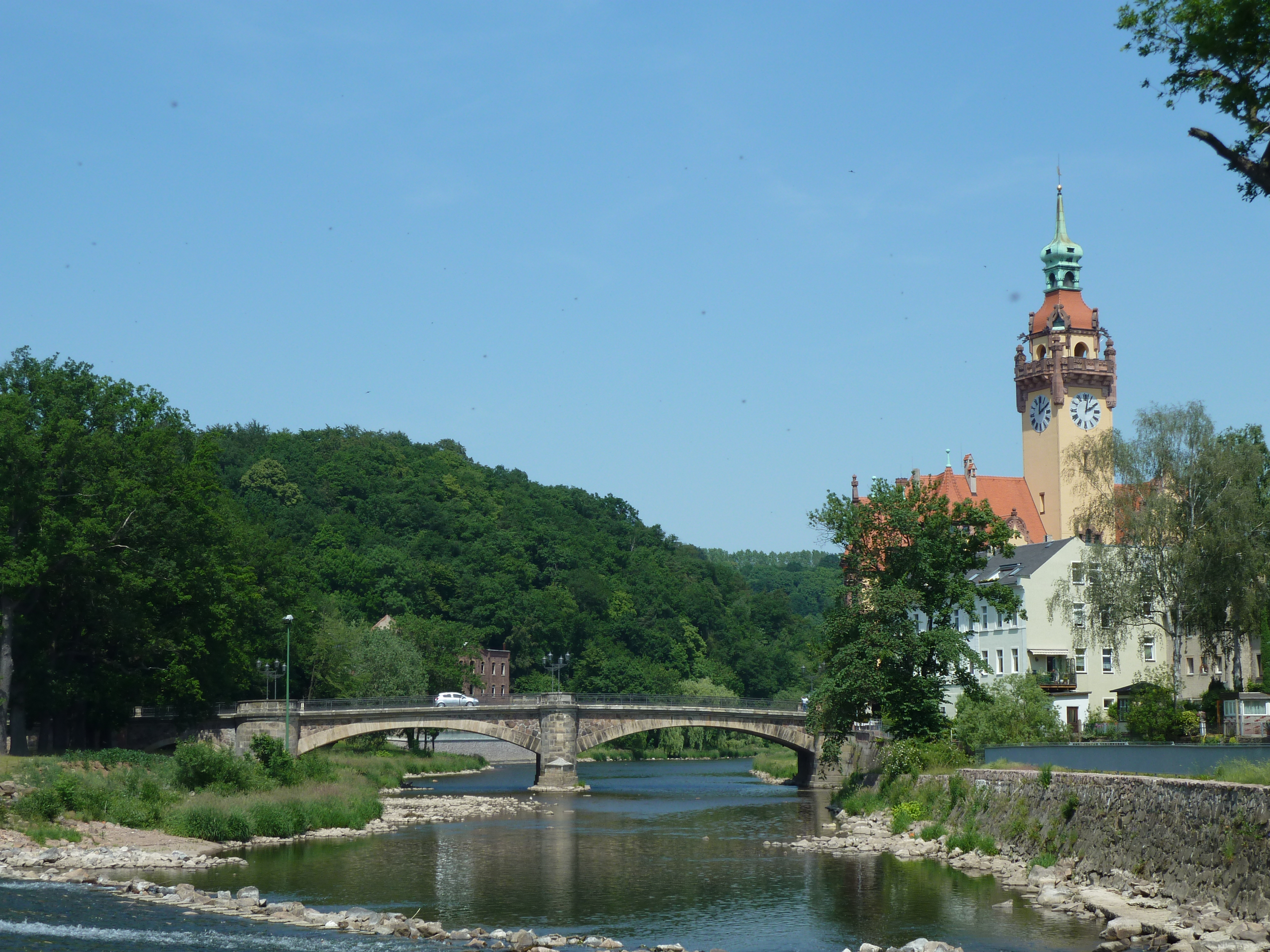
Zschopau River

It is situated in the valley of the river Zschopau, 9 km (5.6 mi) southwest of Döbeln, and 28 km (17 mi) north of Chemnitz. The municipal area comprises Waldheim proper, the localities of Reinsdorf, Massanei, Heiligenborn, and Schönberg, as well as parts of the former Ziegra-Knobelsdorf municipality with the localities of Gebersbach, Heyda, Knobelsdorf, Meinsberg, Neuhausen, and Rudelsdorf, which were incorporated in 2013.

Neighbouring towns are Hartha, Döbeln and Geringswalde as well as the municipality of Kriebstein.

Waldheim station is a stop on the Riesa–Chemnitz railway, served by Regionalbahn trains of Deutsche Bahn and the private Vogtlandbahn railway company.

== History ==
Waldheim in the Margraviate of Meissen was first mentioned in 1198. Waldheim Castle first appeared in a 1271 deed, the surrounding settlement received town privileges in 1286. The castle was turned into an Augustinian monastery in 1404. The population turned Protestant in 1537.

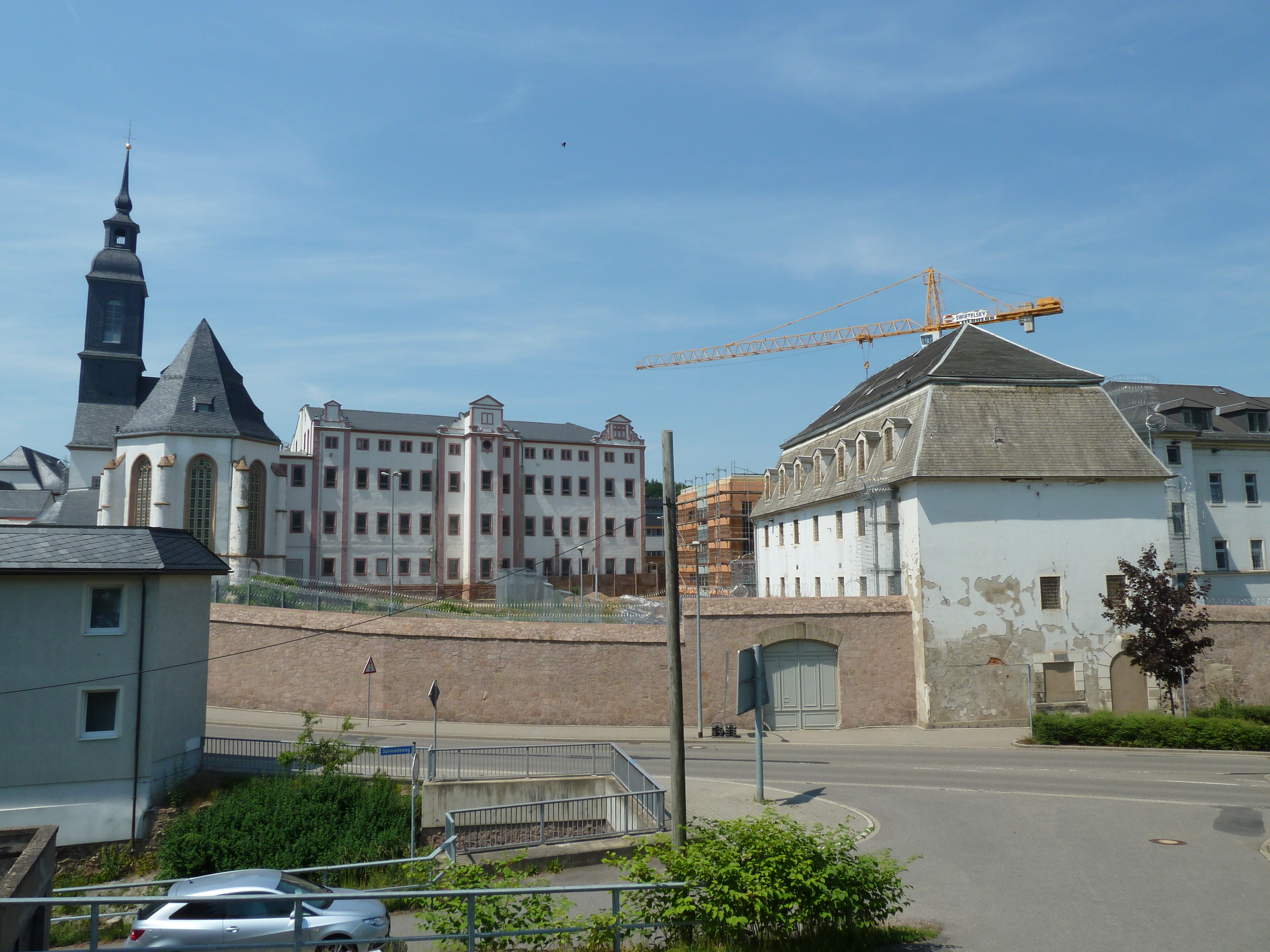
Waldheim Prison

In 1588 Waldheim Castle was again rebuilt as a hunting lodge by Elector Christian I of Saxony. In 1716 Augustus II the Strong inaugurated a penitentiary, almshouse and orphanage in the castle, which is used as a prison (Justizvollzugsanstalt) up to today. The hospital ‘Chur-Sächisches Zucht-Waysen und Armen-Haus’ in Waldheim was the first state institution dedicated to the care of the mentally ill on the German territory. The later author Karl May served a sentence here from 1870 to 1874. In the Nazi era, Waldheim Prison became notorious as a detention centre for political opponents, convicted for preparation of high treason, undermining military morale or just listening to banned Feindsender radio stations. Among the inmates were several resistance fighters like Eva Schulze-Knabe, who was convicted by the People's Court in 1942 and freed at the end of World War II.

When the NKVD special camps were handed over from the Soviet Military Administration to the East German government in 1950, numerous NKVD detainees were transferred to Waldheim for further detention and for trial. From April to June 1950, the Communist authorities put about 3,400 alleged war and Nazi criminals to the Waldheim Trials, ending with prison terms and 32 death sentences.

== Notable people ==
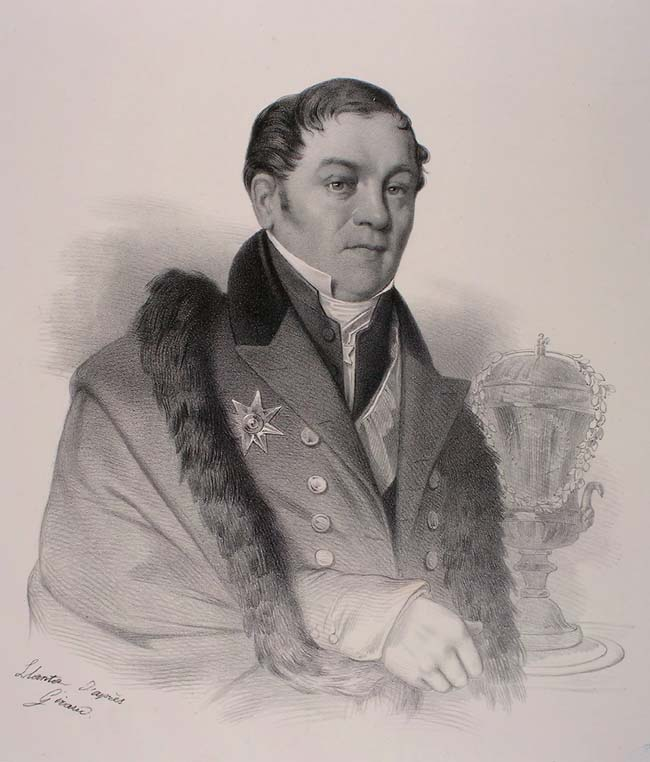
Gotthelf Fischer von Waldheim

- Abratis, Thomas (born 1967), Nordic combined skier
- Altner, Georg (1901-1945), Nazi politician SS brigadier and police president of Dortmund
- Fallou, Friedrich Albert (1794-1877), Lawyer and co-founder of the Soil Scientists (Bodenkundler)
- Fischer von Waldheim, Gotthelf (1771–1853), anatomist, entomologist and paleontologist
- Govinda, Anagarika (1898–1985), born Ernst Lothar Hoffmann, Buddhist, founder of the order of the Arya Maitreya Mandala
- Kolbe, Georg (1877–1947), sculptor
- Meinig, Arthur (1853-1904), born in Waldheim, architect in Hungary
- Wussing, Hans (1927-2011), historian of mathematics and science

== Twin towns ==
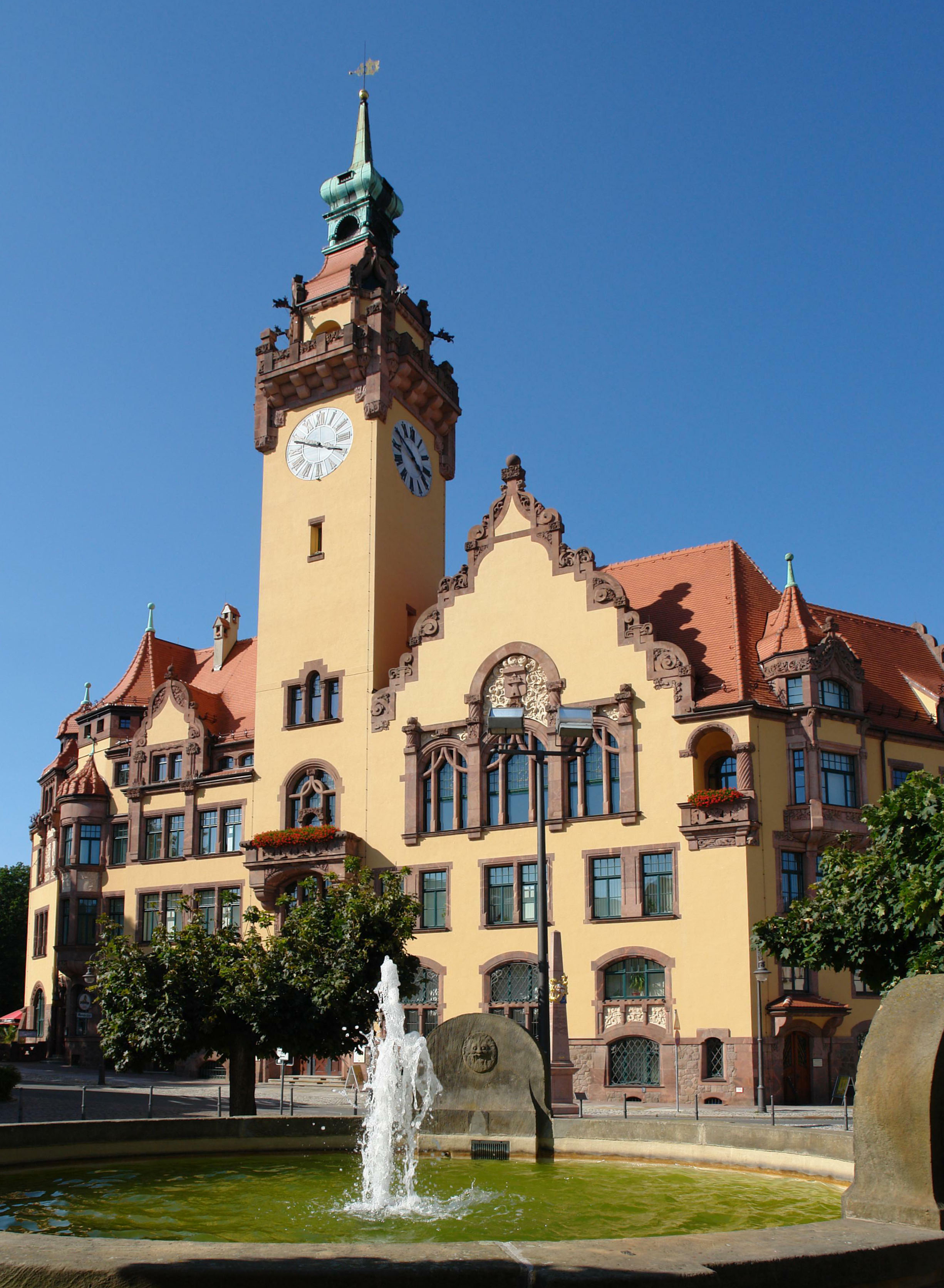
Town hall

Waldheim is twinned with:

- Landsberg am Lech, Germany, since 1990
- Siófok, Hungary, since 1996
