= Döbeln =

Town in Saxony, Germany

- Town
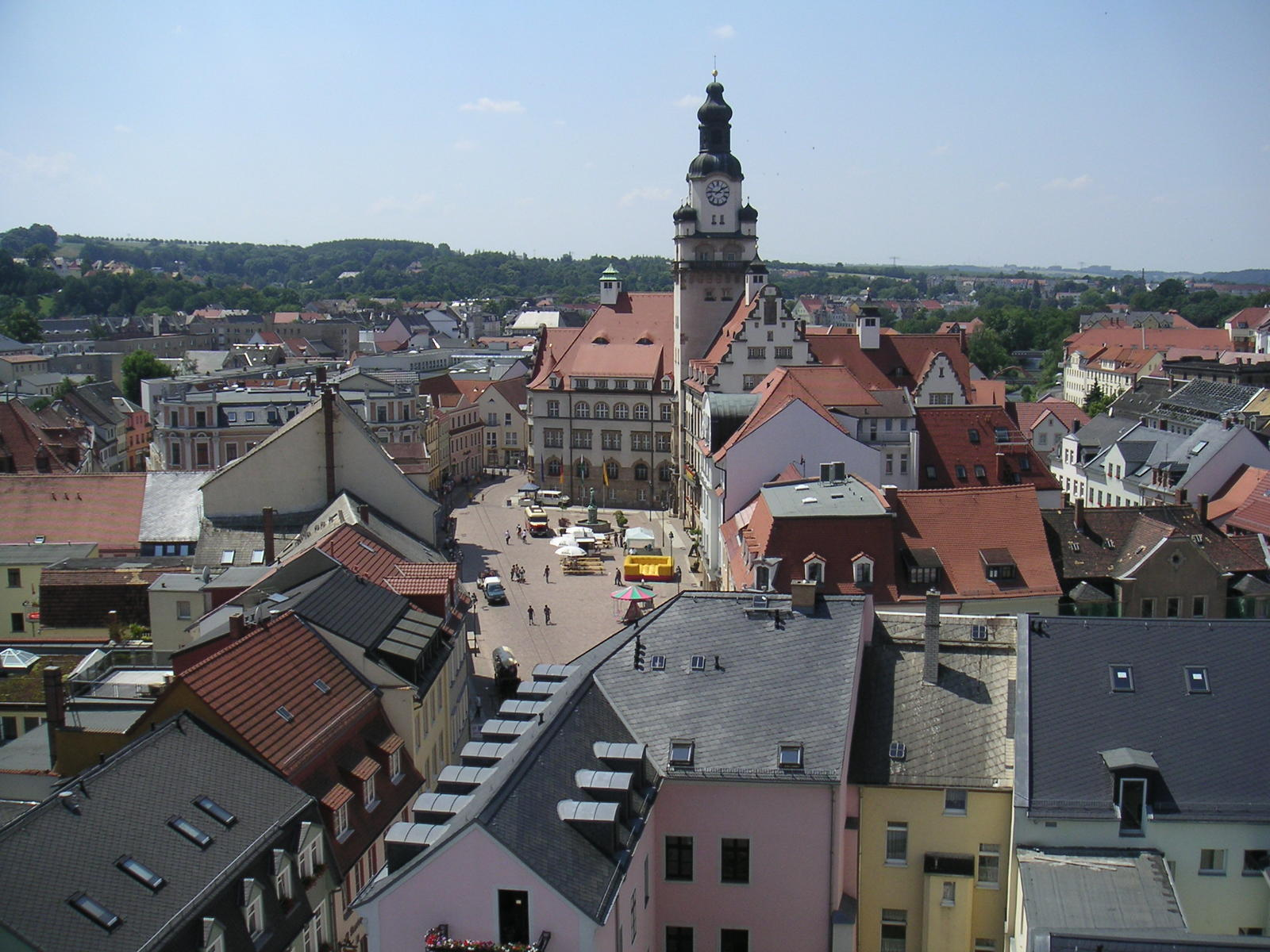
- View of the old town

- Coat of arms

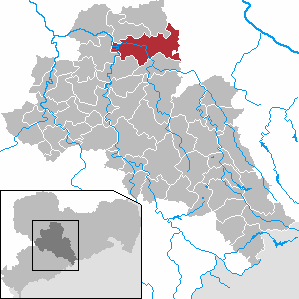
- Location of Döbeln within Mittelsachsen district
- Interactive map of Döbeln
- Location within Germany Location within Saxony
- Coordinates: 51°7′10″N 13°6′46″E
- Country: Germany
- State: Saxony
- District: Mittelsachsen
- Subdivisions: 19

Government
  - Mayor (2019–26): Sven Liebhauser (CDU)

Area
  - Total: 91.74 km^{2} (35.42 sq mi)
- Elevation: 159–262 m (522–860 ft)

Population (2025-12-31)
  - Total: 23,907
  - Density: 260.6/km^{2} (674.9/sq mi)
- Time zone: UTC+01:00 (CET)
  - Summer (DST): UTC+02:00 (CEST)
- Postal codes: 04720
- Dialling codes: 03431
- Vehicle registration: FG, BED, DL, FLÖ, HC, MW, RL
- Website: doebeln.de

Döbeln (German pronunciation: [ˈdøːbl̩n]; Upper Sorbian: Doblin, pronounced [ˈdɔblʲin]) is a town in Saxony, Germany, part of the Mittelsachsen district. It sits on the banks of the Freiberger Mulde river.

== Location and geography ==
Döbeln is situated in the Central Saxon Hill country in the wide basin of the Freiberger Mulde, roughly in the middle of the triangle between Chemnitz (40 km away), Dresden (50 km away) and Leipzig (70 km away). The surrounding area is characterized by the Mulde valley, the lower Zschopau valley and the surrounding hilly landscape. The Zschopau flows into the Mulde near the village of Schweta.

Döbeln has a traditional old town, whose central part is located on the Mulde Island and is surrounded by two branches of the Freiberger Mulde river.

Districts of the town are Döbeln-Ost, Döbeln-Nord, Gärtitz, Großbauchlitz, Keuern, Kleinbauchlitz, Masten, Pommlitz, Sörmitz, and Zschackwitz.

Döbeln has two highway exits on the Bundesautobahn 14, Döbeln Nord and Döbeln Ost.

== History ==
- 981: First written mention of Döbeln (Margravate of Meissen). (Note: gifted to Memleben Abbey as "Doblin in partibus Sclavonie" (transl. "in the Slavic lands"))
- Around 1220: Döbeln is described as a town ("civitas").
- 1293: First mention of Church of St. Nicholas
- 1296: Castle and town are occupied by Adolf of Nassau.
- 1330: Monastery buildings are completed.
- 1333: A serious fire incinerates the entire town.
- 1360: Knight Ulmann of Staupitz builds castle Reichenstein.
- 1429: Looting of the town and destruction of the castle by the Hussites.
- 1450: Döbeln is raided by Bohemians in the service of duke Wilhelm of Wettin, severely damaging the castle (see Saxon Fratricidal War). After that, the castle declined in importance.
- 1567: Döbeln was mentioned as "deserted palace" and afterwards only used as a quarry.
- 1637: Plundered by the Swedes
- 1730: Another serious fire hit Döbeln. As a result, the remains of the castle were used as building material for rebuilding. In this fire, 266 homeowners and 400 renters lost their homes.
- 12 May 1762 (during the Seven Years' War): Battle of Döbeln between the Prussians and the Austrians. The troops of Prince Henry of Prussia defeated the Austrian troops and took prisoners including the commander General von Zedtwitz.
- 1754–1810: Döbeln is a garrison of the infantry regiment Lubomirsky.
- 1847: Döbeln was connected to the railway from Riesa.
- 1857: The railway was extended to Chemnitz.
- 1868: The Dresden-Döbeln-Leipzig railway line was opened.
- 1945: Döbeln was occupied by the Soviet Army without a shot being fired. In June, 1945, the city issued two postage stamps of its own, consisting of Hitler's face blacked out.

Döbeln is known as the "boot town" (Stiefelstadt) because of the world's largest historical giant boots. The first stood around 4.60 metres tall and was made by Döbeln shoemakers in 1925 for the 600th anniversary of their guild. In 1937, it became the property of the town of Döbeln and stood in the town hall and the town museum Wappenhenschstift. A bigger model boot, the Leisniger Riesenstiefel, was made in 1996 and is 4.90 metres tall. Its size earned it an entry in the Guinness Book of Records in 1997 as the largest top boot in the world.

=== Population history ===
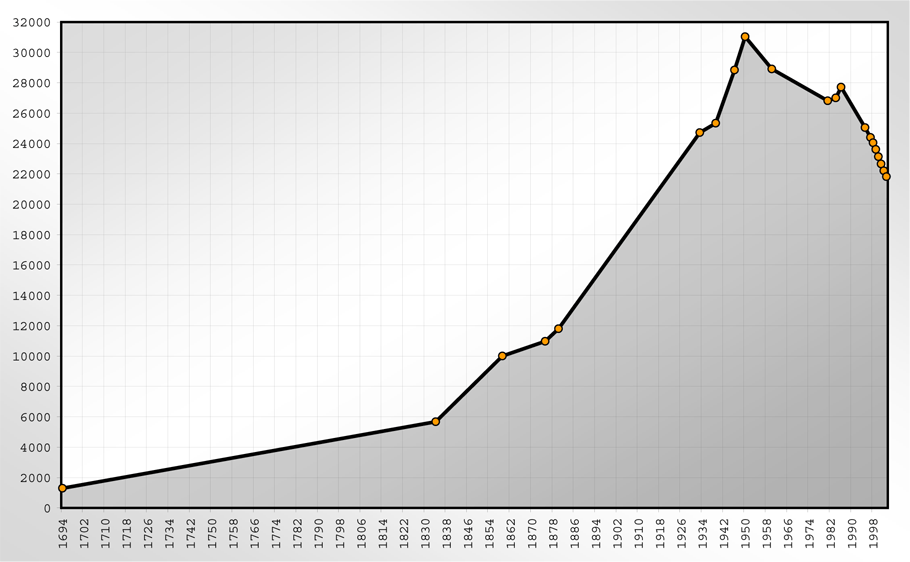
From 31 December 1960 unless otherwise noted:

1694 to 1946: 1694: 1,300; 1834: 5,677; 1859: 10,078; 1875: 10,969; 1880: 11,802; 1890: 13,892; 1910: 19,627; 1925: 22,508; 1933: 24,714; 1939: 25,339; 1946: 28,841	1950 to 1998: 1950: 31,037; 1960: 28,904; 1964: 28,641; 1981: 26,812; 1984: 26,998; 1986: 27,706; 1990: 27,112; 1995: 25,046; 1997: 24,396; 1998: 24,045	1999 to 2006: 1999: 23,610; 2000: 23,128; 2001: 22,653; 2002: 22,201; 2003: 21,816; 2004: 21,365; 2005: 21,236; 2006: 20,943	2007 to 2017: 2007: 20,726; 2008: 20,527; 2009: 20,337; 2010: 20,242; 2011: 21,077; 2012: 21,016 (May); 2016: 23,823; 2017: 23,769 (September)

Note that the village of Ebersbach, with its population of approximately 1,000 was merged into Döbeln in 2011. On 1 January 2016, the former municipality Mochau became part of Döbeln.

=== Memorials ===
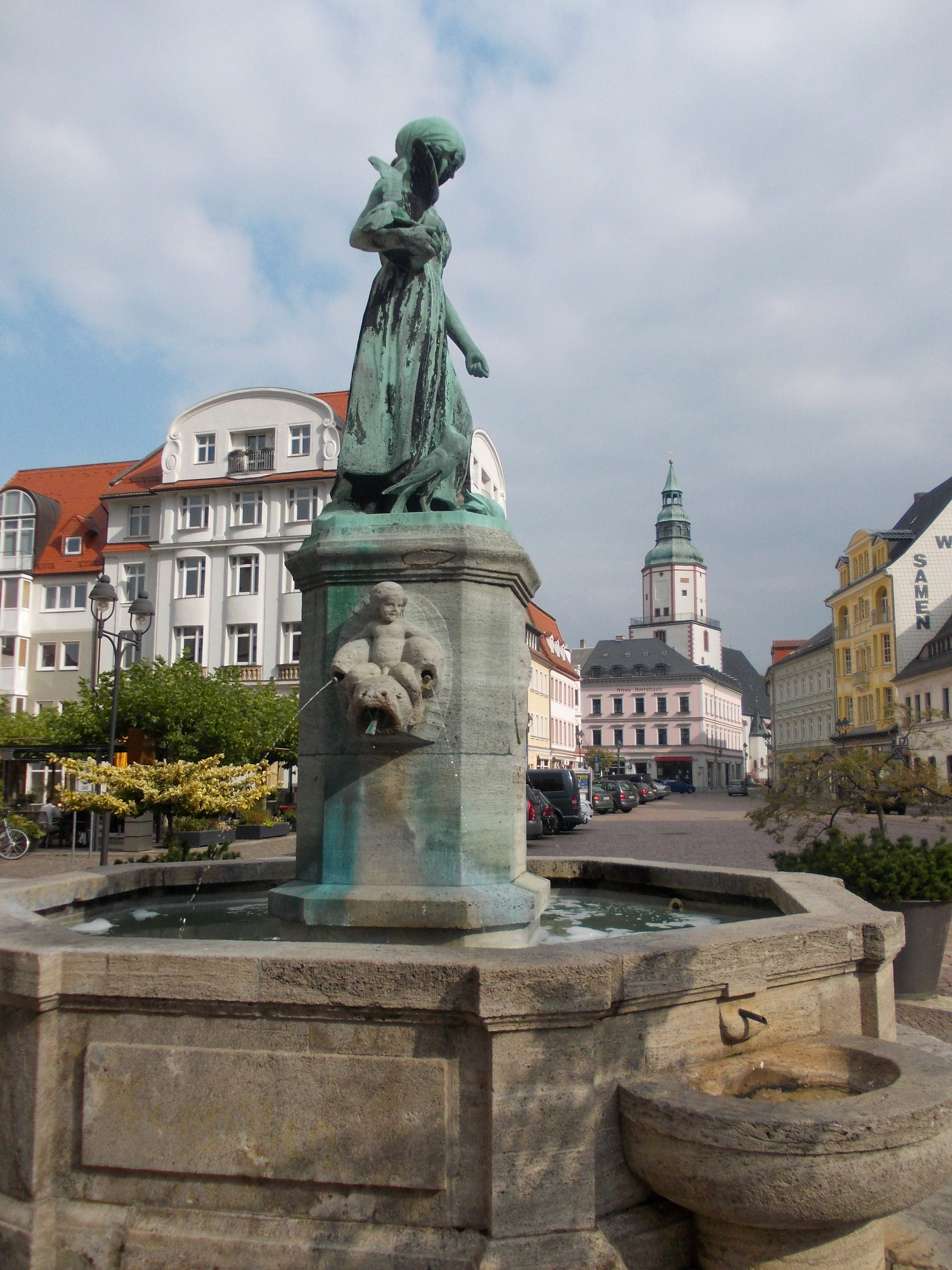
Schlegel Fountain with St Nicholas's Church in the background

- Memorial in front of the Crematorium in the graveyard for 21 Polish and Soviet men and women who were transported to Germany during World War II and died as slave laborers.
- Memorial at Wettinplatz for all victims of fascism.
- Memorial in front of the Lessing School for the victims of war and dictatorship between the years 1933 and 1989.

== Transport ==
Döbeln Central Station is on the Borsdorf–Coswig and Riesa–Chemnitz lines.

It has two connections to the A14 motorway (Autobahn).

Döbeln has the last remaining horse-drawn tram line in Germany, in the form of the Döbeln Tramway. This line originally ran from 1892 to 1926, and was reopened in 2007.

== Notable people ==
- Baroness Gösta von dem Bussche-Haddenhausen (1902–1996), German noblewoman and the mother of Prince Claus of the Netherlands
- Fritz Hennenberg (born 1932), dramaturg and musicologist
- Felix Friedrich (born 1945), musicologist
- Rainer Kirsch (1934–2015), writer and poet
- Helmut Rosenbaum (1913–1944), Nazi commander
- Lars Kuppi (born 1971), politician (AfD)

== Twin towns – sister cities ==
Döbeln is twinned with:

- Givors, France
- Heidenheim an der Brenz, Germany
- Unna, Germany
- Vyškov, Czech Republic

== Sources ==
- Hingst, C. W. (1872). Chronik von Döbeln und Umgebung [Chronicle of Döbeln and surroundings] (in German). Döbeln: Carl Schmidt.
- Wattenbach, Wilhelm (1888). "Volume 2, part 1 - Legal documents of Otto II.". Die Urkunden der deutschen Könige und Kaiser [Legal documents of German kings and emperors]. Monumenta Germaniae Historica (in German). Hannover: Gesellschaft für ältere deutsche Geschichtskunde. document 195.
- Gentsch, Dietlind (1999) [1330–1996], "20603 Stadt Döbeln (Stadtgericht)", archiv.sachsen.de (Official documents archived by Saxony State Archive) (in German), Döbeln, Leipzig
