= Ich bin der Doktor Eisenbart =

German folk song

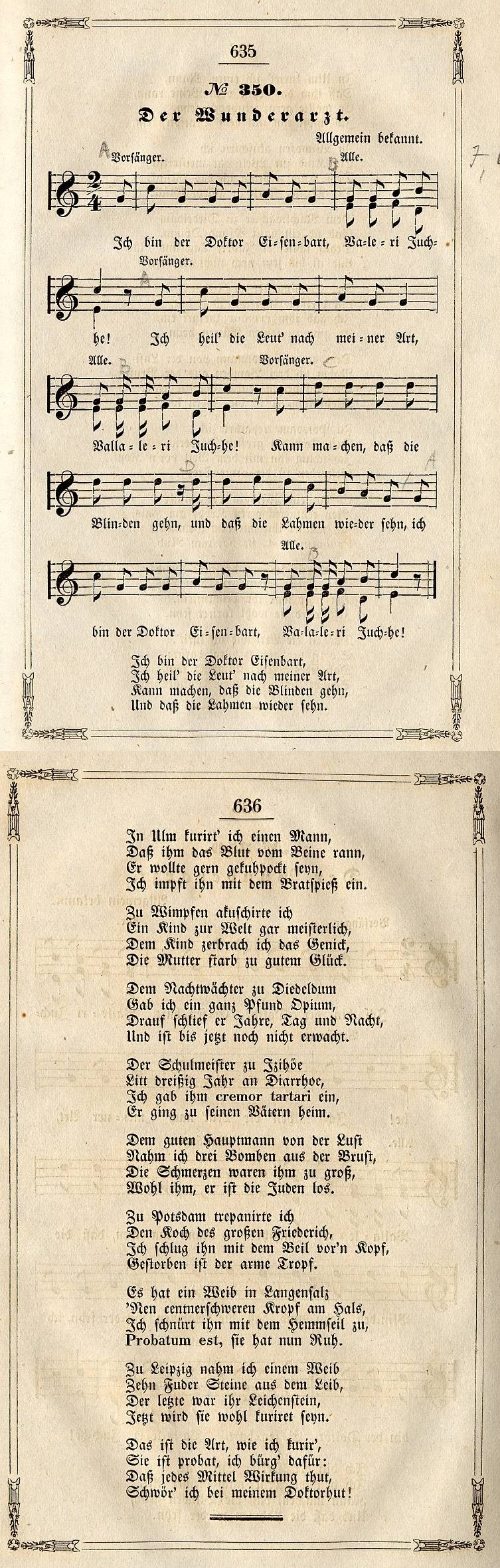
"Ich bin der Doktor Eisenbart", first print with melody, Berlin 1840

"Ich bin der Doktor Eisenbart" ("I am the Doctor Eisenbart"), also called Eisenbart-Lied ("Eisenbart Song"), is a German-language folk song associated with students and first published in 1814. Other variants include a Dutch variant titled "Ik ben Doktor Grijzenbaard" and a Pennsylvania Dutch variant titled "Ich bin der Doktor Witzelsucht". It deals with the treatment methods of Johann Andreas Eisenbarth, who is depicted in the song as a quack. There are numerous variations, of which the earliest dateable publication of 1814 comes from the commercial book of the student association Germania from Göttingen. The first publication with melody appeared in 1840. In the 20th century the song became popular among children, and the melody was also adapted for the equally popular "Ein Mann, der sich Kolumbus nannt".

== Creation ==
The humorous song "Ich bin der Doktor Eisenbart" was probably written around 1800 by Göttingen students. A popular destination for them was nearby Hann. Münden, the home town and burial place of Johann Andreas Eisenbarth.

MIDI arrangement

The song begins with the verse

Ich bin der Doktor Eisenbart,
widewidewitt, bum, bum,
kurier die Leut' auf meine Art,
widewidewitt, bum, bum.
Kann machen, dass die Blinden geh'n,
widewidewitt, juchheirassa,
und dass die Lahmen wieder seh'n,
widewidewitt, bum, bum.

I am the Doctor Eisenbart,
widewidewitt, boom, boom,
will cure the people in my way,
widewidewitt, boom, boom.
Can make it that the blind will walk,
widewidewitt, whoopee hurrah,
and that the lame can see again,
widewidewitt, boom, boom.

and has countless other verses that have been added to the original twelve over time.

== Impact ==
This song, in turn, inspired various authors to write novels to this day (Agnes Harder, 1897; Josef Winckler, 1928; Otto Weddigen, 1909; Fritz Nölle, 1940; Hanns Kneifel, 2002), plays (for example Otto Falckenberg, 1908), operas (Alfred Böckmann and Pavel Haas) and Nico Dostal's operetta Doktor Eisenbart (1952). The school opera Der Arzt auf dem Marktplatz (1957) by East Germans Hanna and Siegfried Stolte, was also based on motifs from the life of Doctor Eisenbarth.

== Dutch-language variation ==
A Dutch-language variation of the song exists too, "Ik ben Doktor Grijzenbaard", removing all references to the real Eisenbart by calling him grijzenbaard (grey beard). In 1978 the Flemish comedy band De Strangers recorded a parody song of "Ik ben Doktor Grijzenbaard", titled "Ik ben Vader Grijzenbaard", which satirized the popularity of Vader Abraham's The Smurf Song, as well as The Muppets.
