= The Mad Bomberg =

The Mad Bomberg (German:Der tolle Bomberg) may refer to:

- The Mad Bomberg (novel), a 1923 novel by Josef Winckler
- The Mad Bomberg (1932 film), a German film adaptation
- The Mad Bomberg (1957 film), a West German film adaptation
