= Rochlitz =

- Town
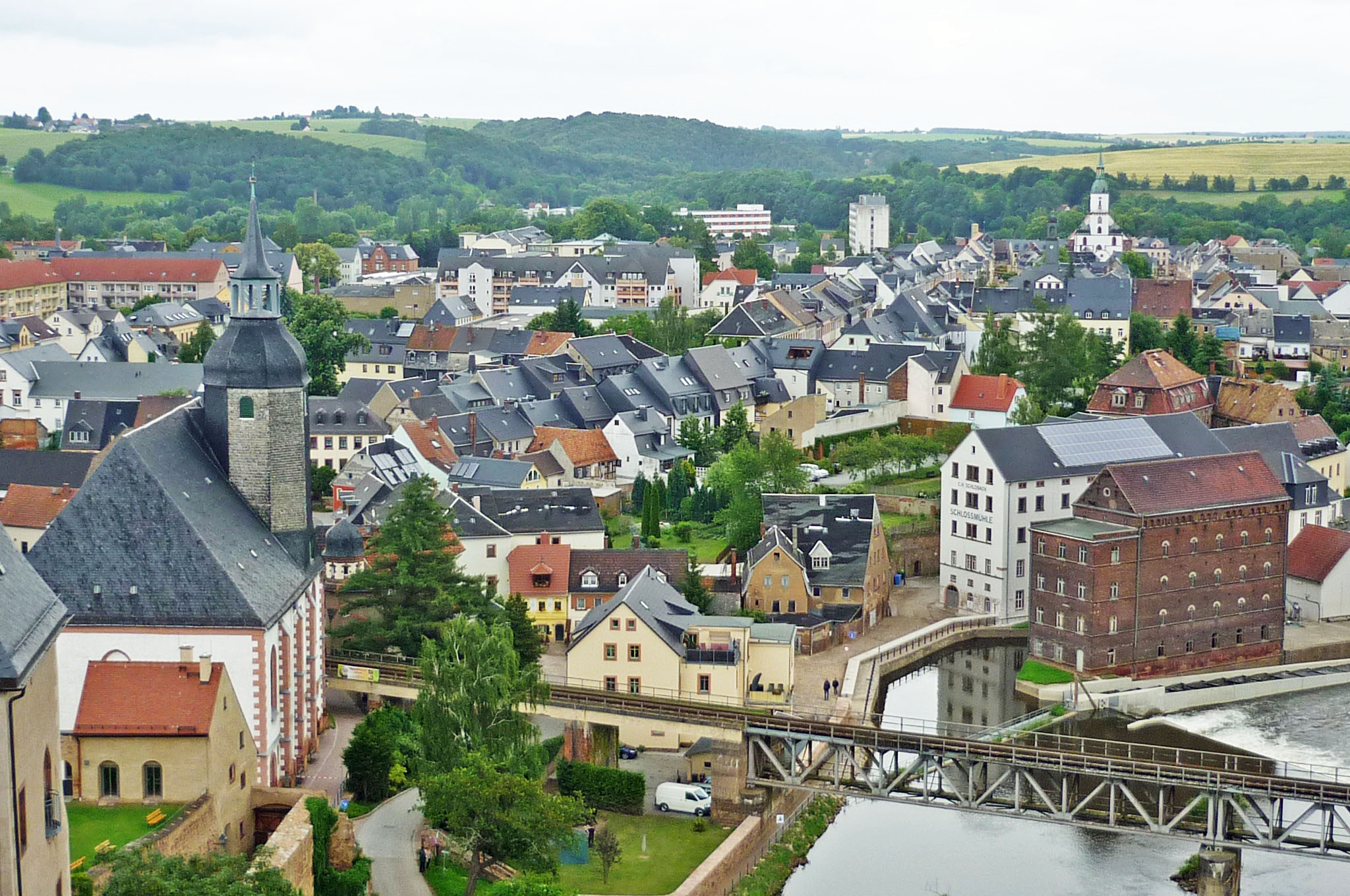
- The town seen from Rochlitz Castle

- Coat of arms

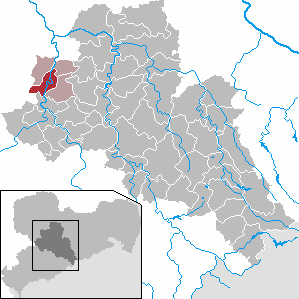
- Location of Rochlitz within Mittelsachsen district
- Interactive map of Rochlitz
- Location within Germany Location within Saxony
- Coordinates: 51°2′53″N 12°47′55″E
- Country: Germany
- State: Saxony
- District: Mittelsachsen

Government
  - Mayor (2022–29): Frank Dehne

Area
  - Total: 23.76 km^{2} (9.17 sq mi)
- Elevation: 163 m (535 ft)

Population (2025-12-31)
  - Total: 5,467
  - Density: 230.1/km^{2} (595.9/sq mi)
- Time zone: UTC+01:00 (CET)
  - Summer (DST): UTC+02:00 (CEST)
- Postal codes: 09306
- Dialling codes: 03737
- Vehicle registration: FG, BED, DL, FLÖ, HC, MW, RL
- Website: www.rochlitz.de

Rochlitz (German pronunciation: [ˈʁɔxlɪts]; Upper Sorbian: Rochlica, pronounced [ˈʁɔxlʲitsa]) is a major district town (Große Kreisstadt) in the district of Mittelsachsen, in Saxony, Germany. Rochlitz is the head of the "municipal partnership Rochlitz" (Verwaltungsgemeinschaft Rochlitz) with its other members being the municipalities of Königsfeld, Seelitz and Zettlitz.

== Geography ==
=== Location ===
The town is situated on a bend of the river Zwickauer Mulde and at the foot of Rochlitzer Berg, 26 km northwest of Chemnitz and 45 km from Leipzig or Zwickau.

=== Geology ===
Rochlitz is situated in the Natural Region Sächsisches Lössgefilde ("Saxon Loess country") and its sub-region Mulde-Lösshügelland ("Mulde Loess hill country"). Rochlitzer Berg (ca. 349 m (NHN)) is of Rotliegend volcanic origin (latest Carboniferous to Guadalupian) and consists to a large extent of so-called Rochlitzer Porphyr, a rhyolitic tuff or ignimbrite. Due to its colour and structure, this rock is used in representative buildings in the wider region like the Old Town Hall in Leipzig and is mined in deep quarries. Pleistocene sediments (sand, gravel) are excavated in the surroundings of the town.

== History ==
=== Middle Ages ===
Slavic villages have existed in the area of the town since the 9th and 10th century, and the name of the town is derived from Old Sorbian Rochelinzi. A market settlement below Rochlitz Castle and east of St Peter's church, near today's square Mühlplatz, formed presumably in the 11th century, likely connected with a ford across the Zwickauer Mulde near the village of Zaßnitz. A farming estate which supplied the castle was built at the same time in Poppitz in the northern part of the modern town area the same time. It was later moved to Königsfeld.

Rochlitz as a town in its own right with its town church St Cunigunde's was founded around 1200 by Dedo the Fat of Lusatia or one of his sons Dietrich (1190–1207) or Konrad (1207–1210), possibly only after 1210 by margrave Dietrich the Oppressed. A characteristic feature of the town is the elongated street market which has an analogue in nearby Geithain. The approximate founding date is supported by archeological findings and preserved Romanesque architectural features of the church which originated in a short basilica without transept. Despite the central location of St. Cunigunde's church, the older St. Peter's church which was situated extra muros remained the parish church for the western parts of Rochlitz until the Protestant reformation.

A town wall was first mentioned in 1288 on the occasion of a partial collapse. It was apparently preceded by a combination of earth wall, ditch, and hedge, and was renewed and extended between 1367 and 1373. The town itself is first mentioned in writing in 1336, its council in 1360, and the first seal of the town is found on a document from 1364. The council obtained the right to execute low justice before 1379, and in 1380 the town obtained a regional monopoly for bleaching cloth. In 1430 Rochlitz suffered from an invasion of hussitic troops, but experienced a boom afterwards, marked by the awarding of the right to execute higher justice and the expansion of other rights in 1464. St. Cunigunde's church was rebuilt in late Gothic style from 1416 to 1476, and obtained a new altar, carved in wood, in 1513.

=== Early modern period ===
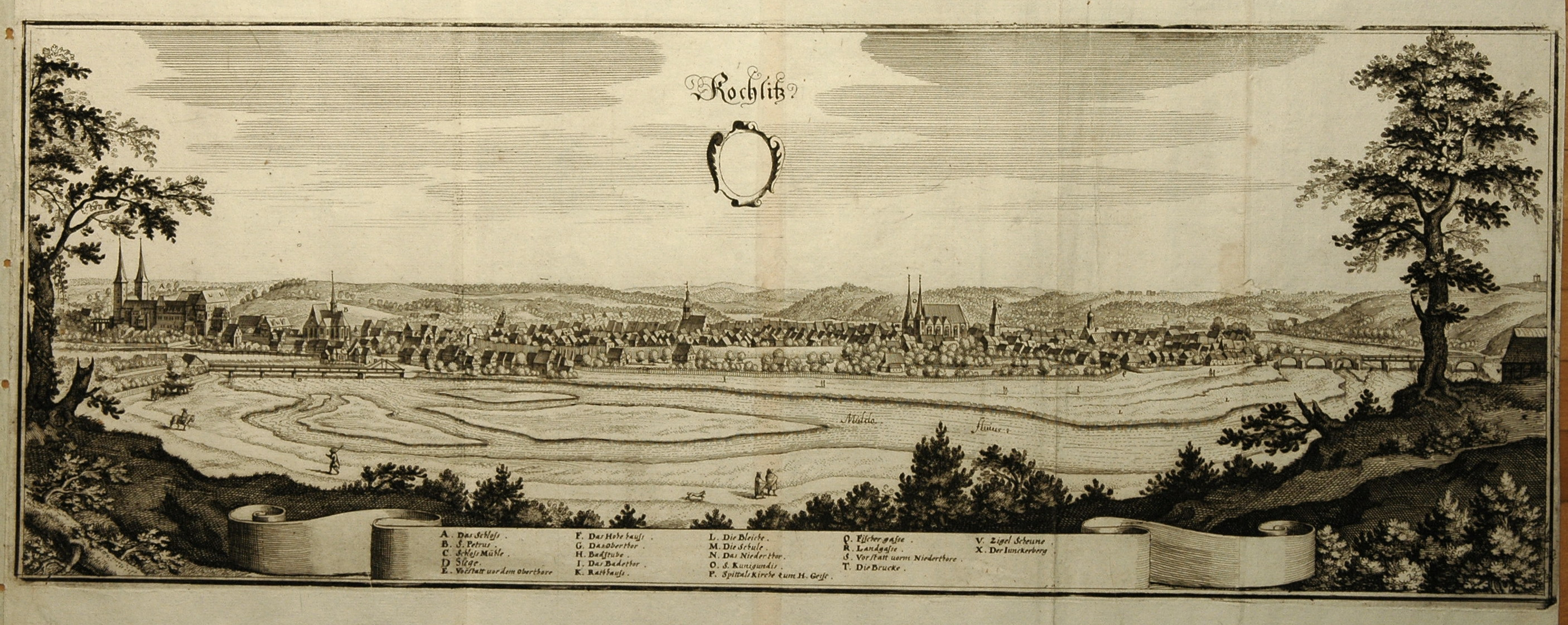
Rochlitz (1650)

The Protestant Reformation was introduced in Rochlitz by Elisabeth of Rochlitz in 1537. After the so-called "old" cemetery with its ossuary had been founded in 1534 on the site of today's square Clemens-Pfau-Platz, a Latin school (demolished in 1876, now library) was built on the grounds of former St Cunigunde's cemetery. It was rebuilt in 1595 at the expense of Electress Sophie. A new hospital church (Church of the Holy Spirit, demolished in 1904) was finished in 1563. The central part of the former lower market square (east of today's town hall) was built over in the first half of the 16th century (Mittelzeile).

In the Battle of Rochlitz on 2 March 1547, Protestant troops won their most important victory during the Schmalkaldic War before their defeat in the Battle of Mühlberg. Three witch trials are documented between 1556 and 1608, ending in one case with a man being executed, while the outcome of the others is not known any more.

During the Thirty Years' War town and castle of Rochlitz were besieged and taken several times. Fires damaged the town in 1632 and in 1682. Following the latter, houses were rebuilt with the eaves of the roofs parallel to the streets. From 1682 an infantry unit was stationed in the town. The travelling barber-surgeon and oculist Johann Andreas Eisenbarth plied his trade in Rochlitz in early 1691. The three-towered front of St Cunigunde's church dates from 1688/1689, its baroque porch was added in 1709. It housed the first public library in the town.

Map of Rochlitz (1799)

In the mid-18th century Rochlitz was connected to the Saxon postal system, which is attested by two Saxon post milestones (reconstructed since). A post office was established in 1734 or 1743, when regular services were introduced. A woolen mill was founded in 1769.

=== 19th and 20th century ===
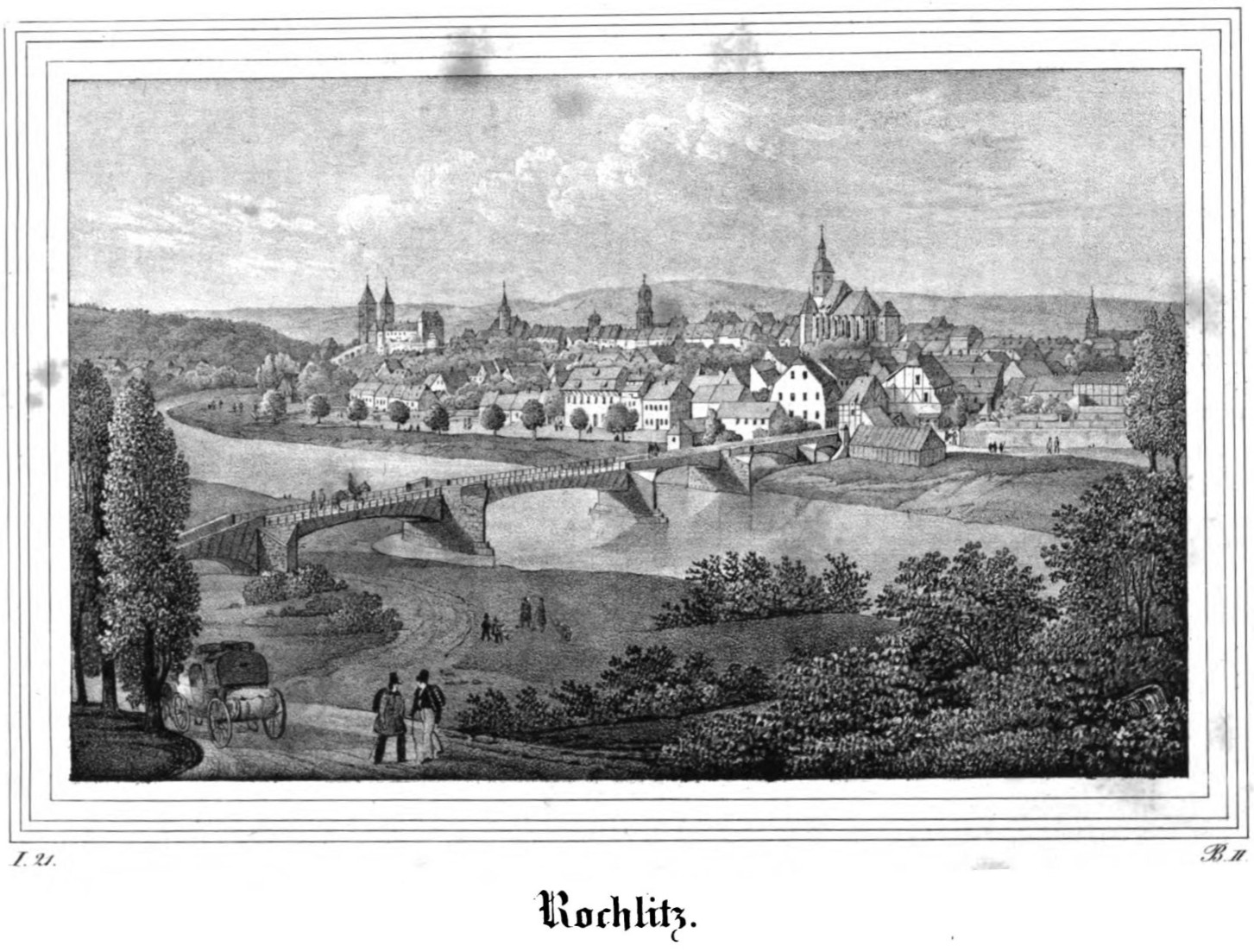
Rochlitz (1835)

Reconstruction after a fire in 1802 changed the appearance of the town significantly with new residential buildings and a new tower of St Cunigunde's church (1804). A first masonry bridge across the Zwickauer Mulde was erected in 1816, a new town hall between 1826 and 1828, and a new hospital in 1854. Beginning in 1830, the town fortifications were removed.

During the Founder Epoch the town boomed and increased in size. The first railway connection opened in 1872. A new school was built near the Mulde river between 1874 and 1876, a new post and telegraph office in 1889/1891. From 1889 the town was extended towards the station.

A further extension in the shape of a garden town was built during the Golden Twenties, a second gas works was built in 1922/1923. The market fountain was created by the sculptor Georg Wrba in 1929. Today's bridge across the Zwickauer Mulde was built in 1933/1934.

The Nazi Party managed early to establish themselves in the town council, and in 1934 they deposed the non-partisan mayor by means of a political intrigue. On the initiative of the president of the local historical society and honorary director of the museum, Albert Bernstein, celebrations were held in 1936 ostensibly in honour of the 1000th anniversary of German control of the Rochlitz area (a mere historical construct), but in reality as a means of attracting business and tourism.

The arms industry established itself in Rochlitz in 1938 as Mechanik GmbH. During World War II, a subcamp of Flossenbürg concentration camp was located in the town from September 1944 to March 1945. The camp held about 600 Jewish women who were forced to labour for Mechanik GmbH.

Units of 76th Infantry Division and 6th Armored Division of Third United States Army liberated Rochlitz on 14 April 1945. Until the Americal withdrawal on 30 June 1945, the Zwickauer Mulde was part of the demarcation line between the American and Soviet occupied territories. Troops of Red Army had already established themselves in Döhlen on the east bank of the river in mid-May 1945.

Beginning in July 1945, the larger enterprises were expropriated and transformed into the publicly owned operations VEB Elektroschaltgeräte Rochlitz, VEB Stern Radio Rochlitz, and VEB Orsta-Hydraulik, who were the principal employers for much of the population of the town. During the existence of the GDR, Rochlitz expanded further, and its population increased. New residential quarters were built: Am Friedenseck 1955–1961, Am Regenbogen 1960–1965, Wilhelm-Pieck-Straße 1977/1978, and Am Eichberg from 1982/1983.

Rochlitz suffered major damage during the 2002 European floods.

=== Incorporated communities ===
Former community	Date	Notes
Breitenborn	1 January 1995	
Hellerdorf	prior to 1875	incorporated into Noßwitz
Noßwitz	1 January 1994	
Penna	1 January 1994	
Poppitz	1 July 1950	
Stöbnig	1 July 1950	incorporated into Penna
Wittgendorf	1 July 1950	incorporated into Breitenborn
Zaßnitz	1 July 1950; 1 January 1994	incorporated into Steudten transferred to Rochlitz

=== Historical population data ===
Despite the incorporation of several neighboring communities in the 1990s, the population of Rochlitz has been declining steadily since then. Additionally, the inhabitants of Rochlitz have a mean age of 48 years and 8 months, the highest value in Mittelsachsen.

Year	Inhabitants
1500	2000
1834	3828
1846	4411
1858	4596
1871	5368
1880	5760

Year	Inhabitants
1890	6186
1910	6363
1925	6218
1933	6307
1939	6154

Year	Inhabitants
1990	8590
1999	7853
2005	6712
2007	6616

Year	Inhabitants
2010	6216
2011	6221
2012	6142
2013	6046

== Politics ==
=== Administrative and judicial history ===
Rochlitz had been a seat of territorial and judiciary administrations for some centuries.

By government order of 22 June 1816 the town became the seat of Amt Rochlitz within the IInd Amtshauptmannschaft (district) of Kreishauptmannschaft (administrative region) Leipzig. When the Kingdom of Saxony was re-districted in 1835, Amt Rochlitz was renamed into Amtshauptmannschaft Rochlitz and became part of the so-called Kreisdirektion Leipzig. By law of 21 April 1873, the Kreisdirektion was again called Kreishauptmannschaft from 1874 on.

In 1939 the town became the administrative seat of Landkreis Rochlitz within Regierungsbezirk Leipzig. Name and territory of Landkreis Rochlitz changed, when in 1952 the government of the GDR dissolved the federal states and replaced them by division into Bezirke (regional districts), and the subdivision in districts was reformed. From then until 1994 there existed a smaller Kreis Rochlitz which was part of Bezirk Karl-Marx-Stadt until 1990 and became then Landkreis Rochlitz within Regierungsbezirk Chemnitz. The incorporation of Landkreis Rochlitz into Landkreis Mittweida ended the role of Rochlitz as an administrative centre.

According to the oldest surviving documents judiciary documents from 1436, the town council possessed the right to execute higher and lower justice, and held the rights to patrimonial justice in the so-called Ratsdörfer (villages subjected to the council) Köttern, Poppitz, and Spernsdorf. In 1834 the municipal court of justice (Stadtgericht) was institutionally separated from the town council, in 1835 a separate court of justice (Ratslandgericht) was established for the Ratsdörfer. Judiciary premises were established in Rochlitz Castle around 1850 and remained until 1990. Detention facilities were built in 1852 and remained in use until 1961. The most prominent detainee was August Bebel. The courts of justice for the town and the villages were joined in 1856 into a single judiciary office (Justizamt, formed in 1856, then Gerichtsamt), that was succeeded by Amtsgericht Rochlitz in 1879.

The district court of justice (Kreisgericht), formed in 1952 as successor of the Amtsgericht that had been re-established after World War II on 6 December 1945, moved out of the castle into the former building of the district committee of SED in 1990, and was dissolved in the course of the district reform in 1994.

=== Town council ===
The communal elections in Saxony on 25 May 2014 resulted in the following distribution of seats in the town council:

- CDU: 7 seats (34.8%)
- LINKE: 4 seats (24.2%)
- FDP: 4 seats (23.3%)
- SPD: 3 seats (17.8%)
- total: 18 seats

Voter turnout was 50.8%.

=== International relations ===
Rochlitz is twinned with:

- Sokółka, Poland
- Nettetal, Germany (historically situated on the other end of Bundesstraße 7)

== Notable buildings ==
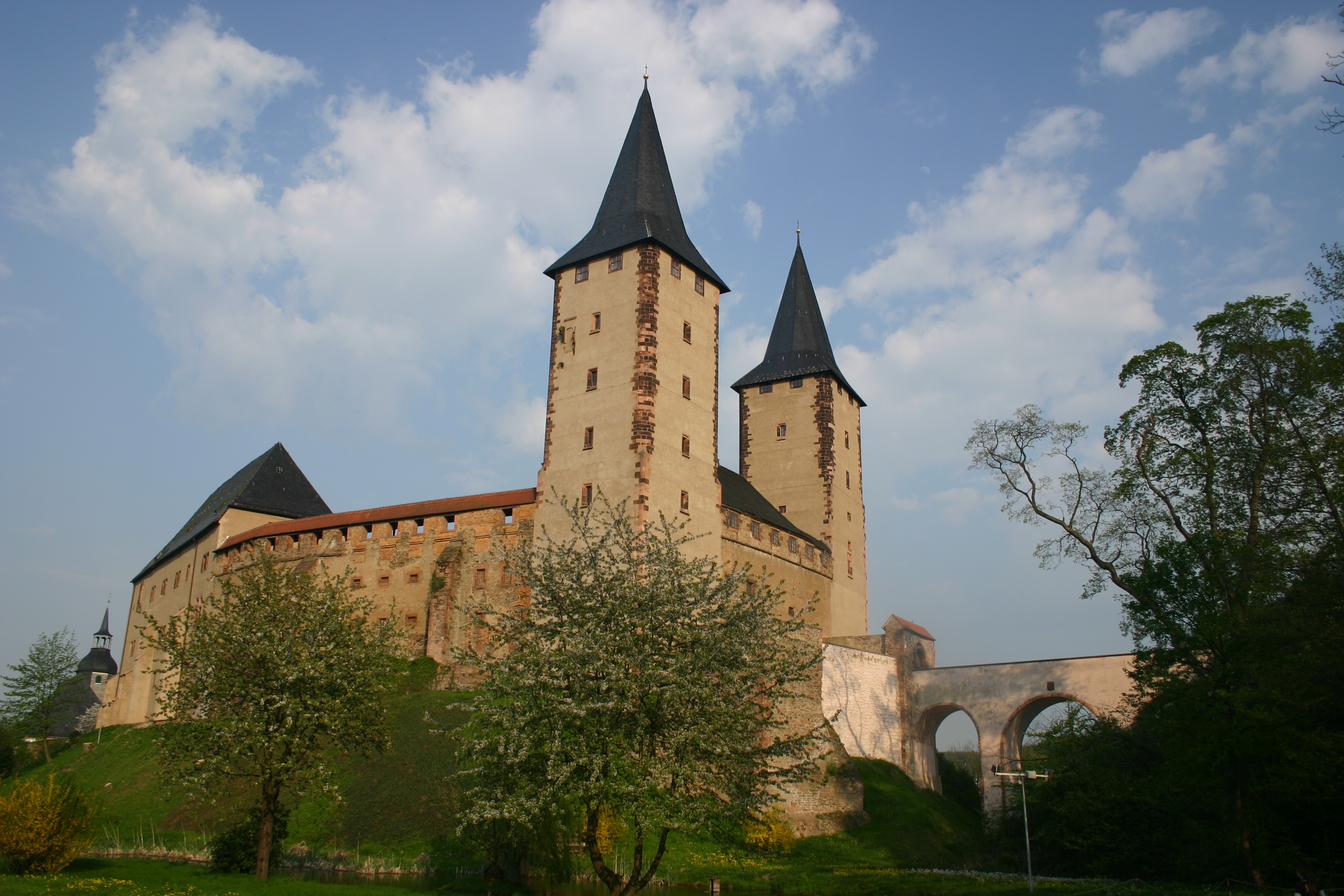
Rochlitz Castle

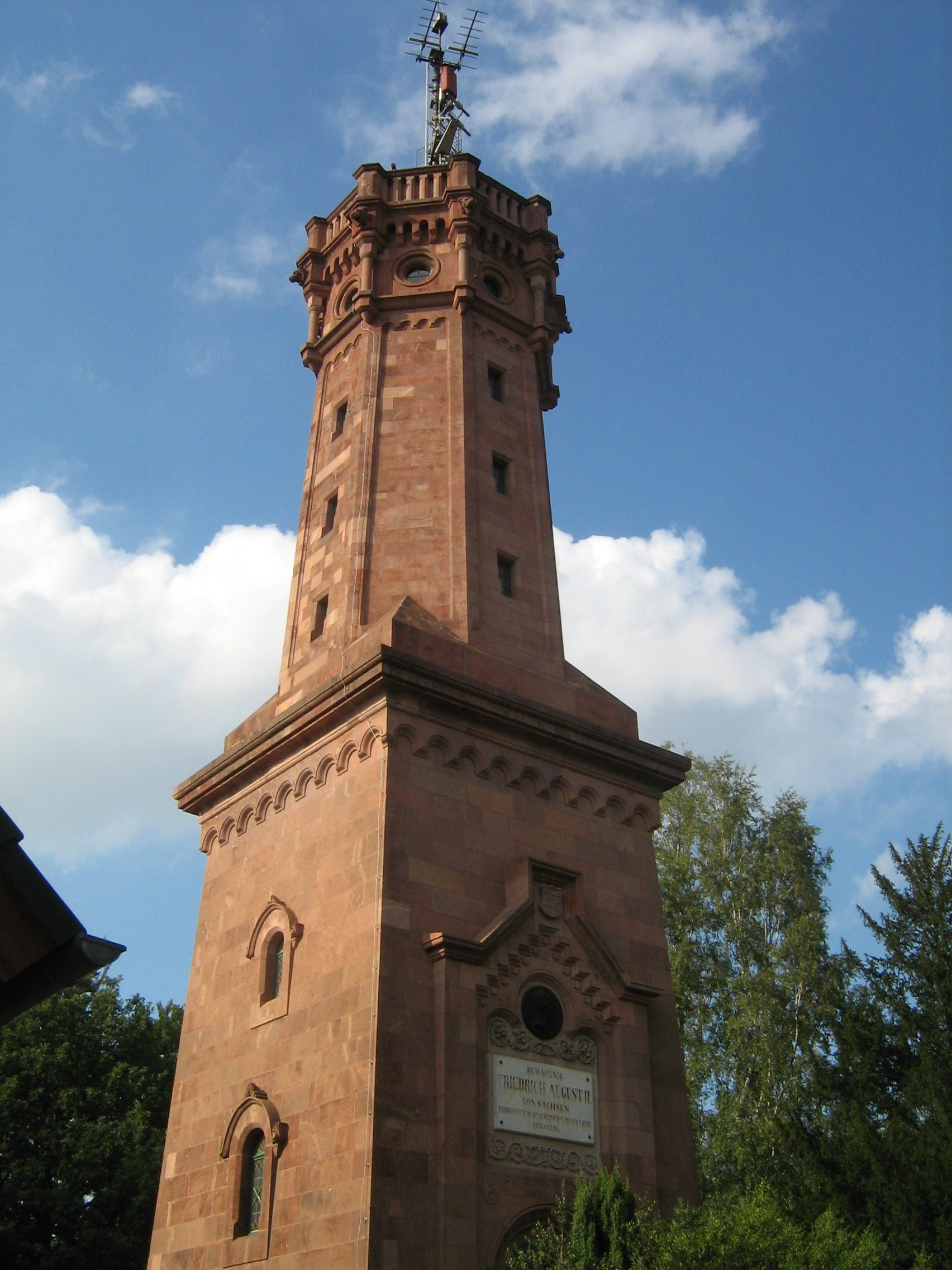
Observation tower on Rochlitzer Berg

=== Architecture ===
Rochlitz did not suffer damage in World War II. Therefore, despite some fires in past centuries, the historical structure of the town, many sacred buildings from the late Middle Ages, and residential buildings from the Renaissance era have been conserved. The historical configuration of the town, consisting of a market square with surrounding buildings, but without a network of streets, is rare for Saxony.

The neoclassicist town hall from 1828 forms the eastern termination of the market square with its patrician houses. St Cunigunde's church, situated to the east and dating in its current form from 1417 to 1476, is a late Gothic hall church, as is St Peter's church (1470-1499) which is situated to the south-west of the town centre towards the castle.

Rochlitz Castle with its two towers and its Gothic chapel has externally maintained its appearance from the 14th and 15th century.

The observation tower on Rochlitzer Berg was built in 1860 from the local "porphyry" stone and is named after King Frederick Augustus II of Saxony.

A Soviet memorial, built in 1958, stands on the former Platz der Deutsch-Sowjetischen Freundschaft where Soviet prisoners of war and forced labourers had been buried and whose remains were later moved to Chemnitz.

Two Saxon post milestones, dated 1722, are located on the location of the former upper and lower town gates, the former stone having been renewed in 1820 using parts of a stone which stood in nearby Zettlitz. A quarter mile stone is fixed in a wall on Chemnitzer Straße 1. There also stands a reconstructed distance post of 1722, and a partly reconstructed milestone of 1860 stands near the road bridge across Zwickauer Mulde.

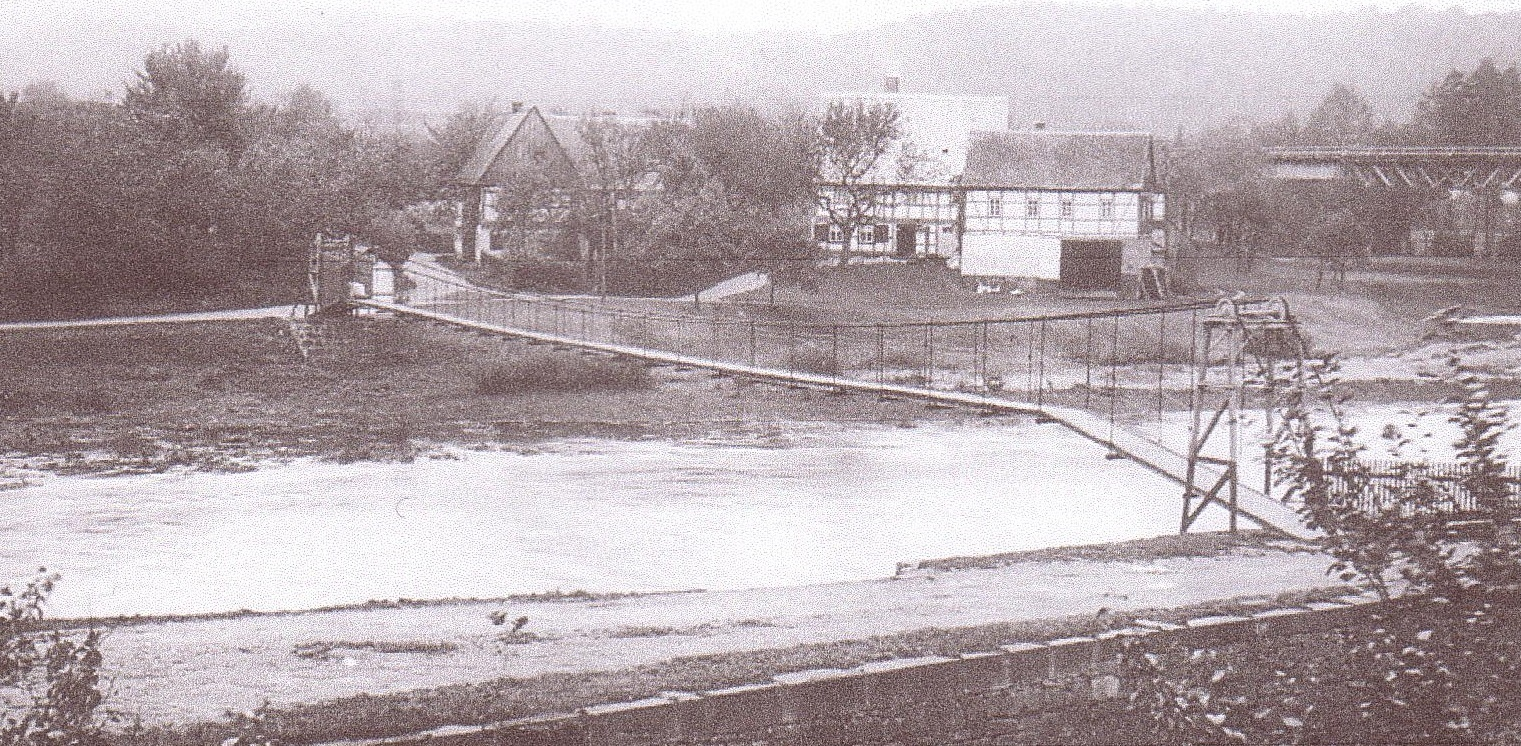
"Swinging Bridge" (1902)

=== Bridges ===
A 1628 view of the town already shows a simple bridge across the river. Farmers built a wooden bridge along the ford in 1502 which was garden from nearby Hohes Haus. It was destroyed by floods in 1534, 1573, 1595, 1618, 1656, and 1661, and had then been replaced by a ferry for more than 200 years. When a boat capsized in 1855, three of its eleven passengers drowned. In 1889 a farmer from Zaßnitz on the opposite bank of the river had built a bridge suspended from a rope and charged a fee for its usage. The miller Schlobach took it over later and leased it out. In 1936 the bridge came under municipal management. The toll booth remained standing for a long time. At Christmas 1940 the users welcomed a reduction of the toll, and at Easter 1942 the usage of the bridge became free. Soldiers of United States Army blocked and guarded the bridge from 14 April 1945, it was reopened after the Red Army took over. The flood of July 1954 destroyed the bridge, and a ferry operated again for some months. While inhabitants of Rochlitz and Zaßnitz built a temporary bridge on their own, the Rochlitz council held back material saved from the old bridge. A new, higher suspension bridge was built in 1958 about 30 m (98 ft) from the old location. It was extensively rehabilitated after the 2002 European floods and was closed temporarily after the 2013 European floods.

The first masonry bridge across Zwickauer Mulde in Rochlitz was built in 1816. It was replaced by today's bridge in 1933/1934.

A 243 m-long (797 ft) railway viaduct near the castle and a 98 m-long (322 ft) lattice truss bridge north of the town were opened for the Glauchau–Wurzen railway in 1875, another lattice truss bridge for the Waldheim–Rochlitz railway was opened in 1893. The worn-out state of the latter contributed to the closure of the line in 1998.
