= Perry Rhodan =

German space opera franchise

Cover of issue #1 (1961)

Cover of issue #2250 (2004)

Perry Rhodan is a German space opera franchise, named after its hero. It commenced in 1961 and has been ongoing for decades, written by an ever-changing team of authors. Having sold approximately two billion copies (in novella format) worldwide (including over one billion in Germany alone), it is the most successful science fiction book series ever written. The first billion of worldwide sales was celebrated in 1986. The series has spun off into comic books, audio dramas, video games and the like. A reboot, Perry Rhodan NEO, was launched in 2011 and began publication in English in April 2021.

== Print publication ==
The series has spun off into many different forms of media, but originated as a serial novella published weekly since 8 September 1961 in the Romanheft (Meaning "Magazine novel") format. These are digest-sized booklets, usually containing 66 pages, the German equivalent of the now-defunct (and generally longer) American pulp magazine. They are published by Pabel-Moewig Verlag, a subsidiary of Bauer Media Group headquartered in Hamburg. As of February 2019, 3000 booklet novels of the original series, 850 spinoff novels of the sister series Atlan and over 400 paperbacks and 200 hardcover editions have been published, totalling over 300,000 pages.

== English translation ==
The first 126 novels (plus five novels of the spinoff series Atlan) were translated into English and published by Ace Books between 1969 and 1978, with the same translations used for the British edition published by Futura Publications which issued only 39 novels. When Ace cancelled its translation of the series, translator Wendayne Ackerman self-published the following 19 novels (under the business name 'Master Publications') and made them available by subscription only. Financial disputes with the German publishers led to the cancellation of the American translation in 1979.

An attempt to revive the series in English was made in 1997–1998 by Vector Publications of the US, which published translations of four issues (1800–1803) from the current storyline being published in Germany at the time.

The series and its spin-offs have captured a substantial fraction of the original German science fiction output and exert influence on many German writers in the field.

== Structure ==
The series is told in an arc storyline structure. An arc—called a "cycle"—would have anywhere from 25 to 100 issues devoted to it. Similar subsequent cycles are referred to as a "grand-cycle".

== History ==
‘Perry Rhodan, der Erbe des Universums’ (Eng: ‘The Heir to the Universe’, though the American/British editions instead used the subtitle 'Peacelord of the Universe') was created by German science fiction authors K. H. Scheer and Walter Ernsting and launched in 1961 by German publishing house Arthur Moewig Verlag (now Pabel-Moewig Verlag). Originally planned as a 30 to 50 volume series, it has been published continuously every week since, celebrating the 3000th issue in 2019. Written by an ever-changing team of authors, many of whom, however, remained with the series for decades or life, Perry Rhodan is issued in weekly novella-size installments in the traditional German Heftroman (pulp booklet) format. Unlike most German Heftromane, Perry Rhodan consists not of unconnected novels but is a series with a continuous, increasingly complex plotline, with frequent back references to events. In addition to its original Heftroman form, the series now also appears in hardcovers, paperbacks, e-books, comics and audiobooks.

Over the decades there have also been comic strips, numerous collectibles, several encyclopedias, audio plays, inspired music, etc. The series has seen partial translations into several languages. It also spawned the German-Italian-Spanish 1967 movie Mission Stardust, which is widely considered so terrible that many fans of the series pretend it never existed.

Coinciding with the 50th-anniversary World Con, on 30 September 2011, a new series named Perry Rhodan Neo began publication, attracting new readers with a reboot of the story, starting in the year 2036 instead of 1971, and a related but independent story-line. On 2 April 2021, light novel and manga publisher J-Novel Club announced Perry Rhodan NEO as a launch title for its new J-Novel Pulp imprint, making this the first ongoing English release of new Perry Rhodan serials in over 20 years.

It has become the most popular science fiction book series of all time.

== Overview ==
=== Fictional history ===
The story begins in 1971. During the first human Moon landing by US Space Force Major Perry Rhodan and his crew, they discover a marooned extraterrestrial space ship from the fictional planet Arkon, located in the (real) M13 cluster. Appropriating the Arkonide technology, they proceed to unify Terra and carve out a place for humanity in the galaxy and the cosmos. Two of the accomplishments that enable them to do so are positronic brains and starship drives for near-instantaneous hyperspatial translation. These were directly borrowed from Isaac Asimov's science fiction.

As the series progresses, major characters, including the title character, are granted relative immortality. They are immune to age and disease, but not to violent death. The story continues over the course of millennia and includes flashbacks thousands and even millions of years into the past. The scope widens to encompass other galaxies, even more remote regions of space, parallel universes and cosmic structures, time travel, paranormal powers, a variety of aliens ranging from threatening to endearing, and bodiless entities, some of which have godlike powers.

=== Multiverse ===
The universe in which the main plot generally takes place is called the Einstein Universe (or "Meekorah"). Its laws are for the most part identical to those of the real universe, as known by late 20th century science. Newer theories about dark matter and dark energy are currently not used in the series. The laws of nature follow old theories that have been disproven, in order to protect series continuity.

There are many other universes, each to a greater or lesser extent different from the familiar one, in which, for example one in which time runs slower, an anti-matter universe, a shrinking universe, etc. Each universe possesses its owntimelines, which are for the most part unreachable from each other but may be accessed by special means, thereby itself creating many more parallel timelines.

The Einstein Universe is embedded in a high-dimensional manifold, called Hyperspace. This hyperspace consists of several subspaces use for faster-than-light travel by technological means. The exact traits of those higher dimensions are got yhr mode pity unexplained. The border of the universe is a dimension called the deep, once used for construction of the gigantic disc-shaped world Deepland.

=== Psionic Web and Moral Code ===
The Psionic Web crosses the whole universe, constantly emitting "vital energy" and "psionic energy", guaranteeing normal (organic among others) life and the wellbeing of higher entities.

The Moral Code crosses through all universes, and is linked to the Psionic Web. It is subdivided into the Cosmogenes, which are again subdivided into the Cosmonucleotids. The Cosmonucleotids determine reality and fate for their respective parts of a given universe, via messengers.

Higher beings are trying to gain control of this Code to rule reality. The Moral Code itself was not installed by the higher beings, the higher powers by themselves have no clue why or by whom the Code was made.

Once the Cosmocrats ordered Perry Rhodan to find the answer to the third ultimate question: "Who initiated the LAW and what does it accomplish?" Perry Rhodan had the chance to receive the answer at the mountain of creation, but refused, as he knew that the answer would destroy his mind. The negative Superintelligence Koltoroc had received the answer to the last ultimate question, 69 million years BC at Negane Mountain, but it is not known if it made any use of the information.

=== Onion-shell model ===
An evolutionary schema, similar to the Great Chain of Being, called the "onion-shell model" is employed in relationship to all life. Here, continuous evolution is from lower to higher lifeforms, culminating in bodiless entities. Later in the series, further lifeforms, representing stages between the known shells, were introduced.

The main shells are:

1. Lifeless matter
2. Bacteria
3. Higher animals
4. Intelligent species
5. Intelligent species that have contacted other species
6. Superintelligences (SI)
7. Matter sources/ Matter sinks
8. Cosmocrats / Chaotarchs (High Powers)
9. Powers close to the "Horizon of the LAW", the essence of the Multiverse

The Superintelligences are the next step above normal minds. They can be born, for example, when a species collectively gives up its bodies and unites their spirits. Such Superintelligences may claim as their domain areas consisting of up to several galaxies (the entity known as "ES ('IT')" has the Local Group as its personal domain). The Superintelligence provides mental support to the species in its domain, sometimes symbiotically (positive SI), sometimes parasitically (negative SI).

The Matter Sources/Sinks are born when a Superintelligence fuses with all life and matter in its domain while shrinking. Little more is known except that the process is gradual and that the resulting object lacks the gravitational pull possessed if the contraction produced a black hole.

The "high powers" were long thought to be the highest known lifeforms. They live in an unimaginably distant dimension and have great powers in ruling over lower beings. However they are not omniscient and they are unable to directly interact with lower beings. To enter a regular universe they have to assume a mortal shape, thus reducing their powers and sometimes their knowledge and memory. This is known as the transform syndrome. As a consequence, they rarely interact with lower beings and instead enlist individuals, organizations or entire species.

=== Conflict between the high powers ===
Among the high powers are two factions known as the Cosmocrats and the Chaotarchs. The Cosmocrats wish to transform all universes into a state of absolute order (a state of utmost entropy, usual symbol S). The Chaotarchs wish to do the opposite and remake all universes into absolute chaos (or negative entropy). They are engulfed in a cataclysmic neverending war involving nearly all known universes. They manipulate and doom whole species for their actions. Open warfare is just one tool among many. In the 2300–2499 cycle the Milky Way galaxy was subjected to open military assault by the forces of chaos trying to establish a bastion of chaos, a Negasphere, in the nearby galaxy Hangay.

Recent stories have revealed to the protagonists that life itself has become a rival to the high powers. Spreading uncontrollably among the universe, it can be found in nearly every niche. The Cosmocrats and Chaotarchs both use life for their own directed goals of order and disorder, but life's unplanned and unregulated cosmological actions are a disturbance for and to both. The Pangalactic Statisticians (a neutral organization of observers) have while some cosmological manipulation is caused by the cosmocrat servants and a lesser amount by the chaos servants, the majority is caused by the uncontrollable power of life itself. To reduce the influence of life, the Cosmocrats have stopped their programs that encourage the development of life and intelligence. They have increased the hyperimpedance in order to reduce the effectivity and durability of most forms of hypertechnology.

At least one power, called Thez, higher than either Cosmocrats and Chaotarchs has been recently identified. Thez is said to live close to the "Horizon of the LAW" so that both Cosmocrats and Chaotarchs have problems understanding it.

== Critical reaction ==
In the introduction to the first English-language edition of Perry Rhodan in 1969, editor Forrest J Ackerman said "[i]n Germany, all serious SF buffs claim to hate Perry Rhodan, but somebody (in unprecedented numbers) is certainly reading him." Many American SF fans agreed with the first part of that statement, feeling the series was an embarrassment and too "juvenile". Tom Doherty, the new head of Ace Books in the mid-to-late '70s, concurred and ended the series in the US, even though it was profitable. This decision meant that by 1980, when the original German versions of Perry Rhodan were becoming "more sophisticated and less aimed at younger readers", the series was no longer available in English.

Critic Robert Reginald has described the series as the "ultimate soap opera of science fiction" and standard "pulp science fiction, action stories with minimal characterization, awful dialog, but relatively complex plot development. The emphasis is always on man's expanding horizons, the wonder of science and space, the great destiny of the human race."

The series' beginnings were often criticized for their description of an expansionist humanity and its frequent space battles; after William Voltz took over the position of storyline planner for the series in 1975 (a post he held until his death in 1984), the series developed a broader ethical scope and evolved its style of storytelling.

While some Anglophone critics dismiss the series, others praise it. In the US, the newer, more complex parts of the series have never been published, so that more negative reviews tend to be concentrated on the simple origins of the series. Editor John O'Neill has called Perry Rhodan "one of the richest—if not the richest—Space Operas ever written."

== Publication ==
=== In English ===
In the 1960s, Forrest J Ackerman organized the publication in the US of an English translation of the series. His wife Wendayne handled translation. Other translators on the series included Sig Wahrmann, Stuart J. Byrne, and Dwight Decker. Number 1, containing German issues 1 and 2, was published by Ace Books starting in 1969. As Managing Editor, Ackerman soon incorporated elements reminiscent of the science fiction pulp magazines of his youth, such as unrelated short stories, serialized novels and a film review section. The series was a commercial success and was eventually being published three times per month.

Ace ended its regular run of Perry Rhodan in August 1977 with double issue #117/118. This was followed by the publication of three novellas from earlier in the series which had not been translated and left out of the series by editorial decision. These were accompanied by three novellas from the Perry Rhodan spinoff series Atlan.

Ace concluded its run of translations with two more Atlan novels and a novel-length In the Center of the Galaxy [German: Im Zentrum der Galaxis] ' by Clark Darlton, which had appeared in German as issue 11 of the "Perry Rhodan Planet Novels" (or Planetenromane) spin-off series.

When Ace cancelled its publication of the series in 1978, translator Wendayne Ackerman self-published the following 19 novels (numbered #119–137) under the business name Master Publications in a subscription-only edition. This was also cancelled in 1979. In the 1990s, Vector Enterprises restarted an American version. This version lasted for four printed issues and one electronic issue and translated #1800 to #1804.

In 2006, Pabel-Moewig Verlag licensed FanPro to publish an English translation of Perry Rhodan: Lemuria. (Some material present in the German version, such as a history of generation spaceships in science fiction, was dropped from the American version.) Only the first volume was released. In 2015–16, Perry Rhodan Digital published English translations of the full six volume Perry Rhodan: Lemuria story arc in ebook format, making these available via iTunes and other digital platforms.

=== Perry Rhodan NEO in English ===
In April 2021, light novel and manga publisher J-Novel Club announced Perry Rhodan NEO as one of three launch titles for its J-Novel Pulp imprint, dedicated to the best of European pulp fiction. Eight volumes, each containing two original German Hefte, or "episodes", have been announced. J-Novel Club's release uses the cover art by toi8 created for Hayakawa Publishing's 2017 release.

In line with J-Novel Club's light novel releases, new instalments are first serialized on J-Novel Club's website over a number of weeks for subscribers. The first part of each volume is free for visitors, requiring and requires no membership or subscription to read. Following web serialization, each volume is released as an Ebook at all major digital book retailers. J-Novel Club members who purchase the books directly receive textless versions of the cover art as a bonus.

Beginning with Volume 13, the English edition features newly commissioned art by toi8.

List of Perry Rhodan NEO English Releases
| No. | Cycle Name | Authors | German Release | English Release |
|---|---|---|---|---|
| 1 | Vision Terrania | Frank Borsch Christian Montillon | Sept/Oct 2011 | 8 June 2021 ISBN 978-1-7183-7910-7 |
Amid crises in politics, climate change, terrorism, and more, humanity’s limited remaining hope lies in science and an increasingly decrepit space program. When a key moon base goes dark, chief astronaut Perry Rhodan and his crew to mount a rescue operation, at least according to a cover story. The true purpose of the mission remains a world changing secret. Contains Episodes: 1. Sternstaub (Stardust); 2. Utopie Terrania (Utopia Terrania)
| 2 | Vision Terrania | Leo Lukas Wim Vandemaan | Oct/Nov 2011 | 27 July 2021 ISBN 978-1-7183-7912-1 |
First contact with the Arkonide race has sent the Earth spiraling even further into chaos. In the Gobi Desert, Perry Rhodan stands his ground as hostile troops surround the new utopia he’s trying to build for all of humanity. The ill alien’s condition worsens. Meanwhile, Sid, John Marshall, and Sue are on the run, while also investigating their newly discovered superhuman powers. Contains Episodes: 1. Der Teleporter (The Teleporter); 2. Ellerts Visionen (Ellert's Visions)
| 3 | Vision Terrania | Michael Marcus Thurner Frank Borsch | Nov/Dec 2011 | 14 September 2021 ISBN 978-1-7183-7914-5 |
Perry Rhodan struggles to defend his utopian city-in-the-making from hostile forces. All his alien technology is gone or broken, leaving little room for optimism, and even his enemies are mired in conspiracies and intrigues, with the threat of a nuclear strike from a shadowy cabal looming. John Marshall and his superpowered companions have escaped the nefarious Clifford Monterny, but Sid, the teleporter, is unconscious and struggling to survive. On a remote island, Marshall and a team of similarly gifted individuals join forces to delve deep into Sid’s memories. To save him, they must uncover the truth about his life on the streets of Nicaragua and the "rescue" that brought him to Camp Specter, where all was not as it seemed... Contains Episodes: 1. Schule der Mutanten (School for Mutants); 2. Die dunklen Zwillinge (The Dark Twins)
| 4 | Vision Terrania | Arndt Ellmer Hubert Haensel | Dec2011/Jan 2012 | 1 November 2021 ISBN 978-1-7183-7916-9 |
The utopian city has fallen! Terrania, which was supposed to be a new starting point for all of humanity, ends up in the Chinese army’s clutches after a nuclear explosion. Desperate to avoid arrest, Perry Rhodan and Reginald Bull make a daring escape in a makeshift aircraft. All is not as it seems in Terrania, however. With the help of telepath John Marshall and his companions, General Bai Jun is getting ready to execute a plan that puts him starkly at odds with his government masters. Meanwhile, Arkonide commander Thora da Zoltral is trapped on Venus after being shot down. As she begins to explore a puzzling ancient base, she starts to realize that this might not be the first time the Arkonides have ventured to our solar system. Little does she know that as she investigates these new developments, back on Earth, her foster father is about to stand trial in the United States. With mankind unable to put aside its petty differences and come together, the promise of the stars looks as far away as ever. Contains Episodes: 1. Flucht aus Terrania (Escape from Terrania); 2. Die Terraner (The Terranians)
| 5 | Expedition Vega | Frank Borsch Christian Montillon | Jan 2012 | 30 December 2021 ISBN 978-1-7183-7918-3 |
With Arkonide technology in the hands of the US army, Perry Rhodan and his team mount a dangerous recovery mission. Disguised as the president himself, Rhodan brings alien Thora da Zoltral and telepath John Marshall straight into enemy territory to steal back a starship that far exceeds any of Earth’s capabilities. Back in the nascent city of Terrania, supplies are scarce. What should be the gateway to the stars is still a building site where volunteer workers survive on meager rations. New arrivals Julian and Mildred soon find their disappointment replaced with awe, however, as they meet some of the city’s strangest residents—and when a theft occurs, they step up to help Bull find the perpetrators. MCrest learns that his true reason for traveling to Earth is not as secret as he thought. Contains Episodes: 1. Rhodans Hoffnung (Rhodan's Hope); 2. Im Licht der Wega (In the Light of Vega)
| 6 | Expedition Vega | Michael Marcus Thurner Marc A. Herren | Feb/Mar 2012 | 14 February 2022 ISBN 978-1-7183-7920-6 |
In the distant Vega system, Perry Rhodan and his crew are trapped on a world that is under attack. To save the Feerons they must reach the aliens’ leader in the central city. At the same time, with teleporter Tako Kakuta leading a group that learns sanctuary in a hospital isn’t as safe as they expected. Meanwhile, on Earth, the Fantan run rampant, seeking special people, things, and moments they call "Besun." When Adams catches the attention of one of these otherworldly beings, he stages an attempt to stop the invasion via a tour of the finest that Earth’s culture has to offer.: 1. Schlacht um Ferrol (The Battle for Ferrol); 2. Tod unter fremder Sonne (Death Beneath an Alien Sun)
| 7 | Expedition Vega | Herman Ritter Wim Vandemaan | Mar 2012 | 4 April 2022 ISBN 978-1-7183-7922-0 |
Trapped in the Vega system, the Terrans are finding the universe even more alien than expected. They encounter winged people, an organic building and the Ferrons’ three-eyed ruler. When the Topsidans demand surrender, Kakuta hatches a plan to turn the tide with his teleportation ability. Elsewhere, Rhodan meets an elderly Arkonide who has been waiting in a crumbling base for millennia, hoping his commander will one day return. Mistaking Rhodan for that commander, he tells a tale that encompasses the war-torn history of the Ferrons. At the same time, Bull and his companions remain prisoners of the Fantan. But with Gucky, their sardonic alien cellmate, they hit a way to pass the time and create an escape attempt. Contains Episodes: 1. Schatten über Ferrol (Shadows over Ferrol); 2. Die Giganten von Pigell (The Giants of Pigell)
| 8 | Expedition Vega | Bernd Perplies Christian Montillon | Apr 2012 | 23 May 2022 ISBN 978-1-7183-7924-4 |
The brutal war in the Vega system continues towards its conclusions. Rhodan gives the Topsidans’ military leader a promise he can’t keep, hoping that either they’ll buy it, or it will buy Thora enough time to sabotage the lizards’ flagship. Will they escape with their lives, and will they do enough damage to turn the tides of the interstellar conflict? Further help might arrive from unexpected sources as the scattered members of Rhodan’s crew take their fates into their own hands and regroup. Stranded in the jungle, Kakuta, Morozova, and Deringhouse hatch a plan to hijack an enemy vessel and rejoin the fight. Meanwhile, the Fantan continue to plunder Earth, but Pounder and Crest are ready to take decisive action. Contains Episodes: 1. Schritt in die Zukunft (A Step Into the Future); 2. Finale für Ferrol (Finale for Ferrol)
| 9 | The Galactic Riddle | Frank Borsch Michelle Stern | May 2012 | 15 September 2022 ISBN 978-1-7183-7926-8 |
With alien threats out of the way, a new day dawns for humanity. Tragic revelations are afoot, however, as Crest learns he has very little time left and is driven to resume his search for eternal life. When he travels beyond reach, it’s up to Rhodan, Thora, and their team to look for him by using one of the transmitters. But this ancient technology works in mysterious ways. Instead of finding Crest, they emerge on a war-torn alien world. Meanwhile, Mildred and Julian take Gucky, the alien Mousebeaver on a road trip across the USA. Their goal? To find Julian’s father, William Tifflor, who disappeared after defending Crest during his trial. With nefarious forces at play, it’s not long before Gucky is separated from his human companions...and finds himself unable to use his powers. Dangers past and present are lurking around every corner as Earth's heroes take their next step towards the stars. Contains Episodes: 1. Der Administrator (The Administrator); 2. Der erste Thort (The First Thort)
| 10 | The Galactic Riddle | Marc A. Herren Hermann Ritter | June 2012 | 24 November 2022 ISBN 978-1-7183-7928-2 |
When Crest leads an unlikely group on his search for the Planet of Eternal Life, they end up on a version of Ferrol that shouldn’t exist and suspect that they have entered a parallel universe. Meanwhile, Sid comes face to face with his greatest foe, Ivanovich Goratschin, who killed Sid’s childhood friend, but he’s been dead for a long time. His twin brother claims to be making a fresh start. In the Vega system, Rhodan’s crew, lost in space and time after landing on the Ferron world of Reyan, discovers a conflict brewing between the water-dwellers and the land-dwellers, two groups descended from the original colonists. Back home, Dr. Manoli and the historian Aescunnar have begun a space journey of their own as they attempt to learn more about the Arkonides’ prior activities in Earth’s solar system. Their research soon brings them to Saturn’s moons, where danger and an uncertain fate await them. Contains Episodes: 1. Unter zwei Monden (Beneath Two Moons); 2. Die schwimmende Stadt (The Floating City)
| 11 | The Galactic Riddle | Alexander Huiskes Wim Vandemaan | July 2012 | 13 January 2023 ISBN 978-1-7183-7930-5 |
Crest and his companions find themselves transported to a desolate, dying planet inhabited by insectoid creatures pursuing a dangerous mission under the yoke of the Arkonides: complete a superweapon for use against the Methanes. While investigating, they discover a more familiar species—the Ilts—being oppressed by their hosts. Meanwhile, Manoli and his companions have fallen ill. The mysterious sickness is thought to be linked to their time as Besun, but relations between the Fantan and Earth are fragile. Can the Fantan save their former captives’ lives? Elsewhere in the galaxy, Rhodan’s crew find themselves stranded in time and space on Ambur, the Vega system’s mysterious tenth planet, a hostile wasteland with pockets of civilization. What are Rhodan, Thora, and the others expected to give in return for their rescue by its inhabitants? And can the strangers cure the strange affliction tormenting Bull and Sue? Contains Episodes: 1. Der Weltenspalter (The World-Splitter); 2. Zisternen der Zeit (Cisterns of Time)
| 12 | The Galactic Riddle | Christian Montillon Frank Borsch | August 2012 | 17 March 2023 ISBN 978-1-7183-7932-9 |
Crest da Zoltral and his companions narrowly escape Tramp only to find themselves clinging to life on a severely damaged ship. When an Arkonide vessel comes to their rescue and takes them to Larsaf III, suspicions surrounding the rescued time travelers increase and they soon find themselves imprisoned as the Methanes attack. Meanwhile, Rhodan’s group arrives by stowing away on an alien ship. Their reception is all the more hostile, as they are forced to flee into the forest to avoid robots hunting them down. Driven by a vision Rhodan once had, they strive to find a path from the hemispherical planet’s round side to its strange and implausible flat side. As secrets abound and IT’s servants play a game of wits with competing agendas, what truths will be revealed about the Planet of Eternal Life, and will the heroes finally be granted the immortality they seek? Contains Episodes: 1. Zuflucht Atlantis (Refuge Atlantis); 2. Welt der Ewigkeit (World of Eternity)
| 13 | Advance on Arkon | Leo Lukas Bernd Perplies | September 2012 | 8 May 2023 ISBN 978-1-7183-7934-3 |
Aescunnar is dispatched to Bradbury Base, a human settlement on Mars aided by Ferron technology, but quickly finds that not all is as it seems. Meanwhile, the Tosoma has begun its voyage to the Arkonide Empire with Thora at its helm. Rhodan must try to save not only the ship and its passengers from harm. At the same time, Eric Manoli arrives on the Topsidan homeworld. Sheltered in a dangerous city where the locals have little love for offworlders. Back on Terra, intrigue is brewing as dark facets of Bai Jun’s past come to light. When a shadowy group starts to blackmail him for their own ends, he is faced with difficult decisions. Contains Episodes: 1. Zielpunkt Arkon (Destination Arkon); 2. Planet der Echsen (Planet of the Lizards)

=== In other countries ===
Translations of Perry Rhodan are currently available in Brazil (#1 to #536 and #650 to #847 as of August 2011), and also from 537 to 649; 1400 in before (at present, in December 2014), including the series Atlan, Planetary Novels and Perry Rhodan NEO (at present in the n. 28), all launched by the "Project Translation", Russia, China, Japan(#1 to #800 as of May 2011), France, the Czech Republic, and the Netherlands (#1 to #2000 as of September 2009). Apart from the US version, there were also editions in Canada, Great Britain (#1 to #39), Italy and Finland. However, the latter have been discontinued.

The first language into which Perry Rhodan was translated was Hebrew. In 1965, the first four episodes appeared in Tel Aviv in a pirated translation, and which for unknown reasons ceased before publication of the fifth (it was not because it was detected by the German publishers, who only heard about it many years later). The few surviving copies of this 1965 translation are highly valued by Israeli collectors.

==== Cycles ====
The original series is divided into the following cycles and "grand cycles". Only the grand cycles the Great Cosmic Mystery and Thoregon have official names. The other grand cycles were not planned as such. They were named by the readers in retrospect.

- Milky Way
  - The Third Power (Issues 1 to 49)
  - Atlan and Arkon (50 to 99)
  - The Posbis (100 to 149)
  - The Second Empire (150 to 199)
- Distant Galaxies
  - Masters of the Island (Andromeda) (200 to 299)
  - M 87 (300 to 399)
- The Crumbling Empire
  - The Cappins (400 to 499)
  - The Swarm (500 to 569)
  - The Old Mutants (570 to 599)
  - Cosmic Chess Game (600 to 649)
  - The Council (650 to 699)
- Superintelligences
  - Aphilia (700 to 799)
  - BARDIOC (800 to 867)
  - PAN-THAU-RA (868 to 899)
  - The Cosmic Castles (900 to 999)

- Moral Code
  - The Cosmic Hansa (1000 to 1099)
  - The Endless Armada (1100 to 1199)
  - Chronofossils (1200 to 1299)
  - Netrunners(1300 to 1349)
  - Tarkan (1350 to 1399)
- Cell Activators
  - The Cantaro (1400 to 1499)
  - The Linguids (1500 to 1599)
- Grand Cycle The Great Cosmic Mystery
  - The Ennox (1600 to 1649)
  - The Great Void (1650 to 1699)
  - The Ayindi (1700 to 1749)
  - The Hamamesh (1750 to 1799)

- Grand Cycle Thoregon
  - The Tolkander (1800 to 1875)
  - The Heliotic Bulwarks (1876 to 1899)
  - The Sixth Messenger (1900 to 1949)
  - MATERIA (1950 to 1999)
  - The Solar Residence (2000 to 2099)
  - Empire of Tradom (2100 to 2199)
- name TBD
  - The Star Ocean (2200 to 2299)
  - TERRANOVA (2300 to 2399)
  - The Negasphere (2400 to 2499)
  - The Stardust (2500-2599)
  - The Neuroverse (2600-2699)
  - The Atopic Tribunal (2700-2799)
  - The Lands Out Of Time (2800-2874)
  - Starvault (2875-2899)
  - Genesis (2900-2999)
  - Myth (3000-3099)
  - The Chaotarchs (3100-3199)
  - The Fragments (3200-3299); since December 2022

==== American publication history ====
- Ace Books
  - #1 to #5—Double issues. Each volume contains two episodes. The German novel between episodes 4a and 4b, #0009 Hilfe fuer die Erde/Help for Earth, was initially skipped, but later printed as a Special Edition (The Atom-Men Attack).
  - #6 to #108—Single issues. "Maga-book" format, or the style of a magazine in the format of a book. Two more skipped novels ("lost") were 0021, Der Atomkrieg findet nicht statt/The atomic war doesn't take place (between 014 Venus in Danger and 015 Thora's Flight) and 0031 Der Kaiser von New York/The Ruler of New York (between 023 Peril on Ice Planet and 024 Infinity Flight). 0021 was finally printed as a Special, Menace of Atomigeddon, and 0031 as Robot Threat: New York.

Letter page and film reviews began in #6. Would later include short stories—old and new—and reprints of classic serialized novels such as Edison's Conquest of Mars by Garrett P. Serviss (reprinted as Pursuit to Mars). Of special note is a lost chapter of the H.G. Wells novel The Time Machine that was published in this manner. Also serialized was William Ellern's New Lensman novel.

  - #109 to #118—double issues again, each one still separate.
  - Perry Rhodan Specials #1 to #5—Double issues. #1 to #3 are skipped episodes ("lost") published with an Atlan episode. #4 are two Atlan episodes and #5 (unnumbered) is a Planetenroman.
- Master Publications
  - #119 to #136—Magazine size and format.
  - #137—Book format. To fill out remaining subscription orders, the book format also printed Stuart J. Byrne's Star Man series (expanded into novellas from Byrne's novel of the same name). #137 was published with the first five episodes of Star Man in one volume. The remaining Star Man episodes were published as a separate volume.
- Vector Enterprises
  - #1800 to #1803—Magazine format. #1800 is published in a manner similar to the German series. 1801 to 1803 are large-sized magazine format.
  - #1804—Electronic format only.
- FanPro Games (American operation of German company FanPro)
  - Lemuria #1 "The Star Ark."

Copies of the Ace books and the rarer magazine versions can be found in online auction sites such as eBay and fixed-price online stores like Amazon.com. Used bookstores often have some of the Ace books, but rarely the magazine versions.

== Cultural impact ==
=== In current events ===
Matthias Rust, the then-18 year old aviator who landed his Cessna 172 aircraft on the Bolshoy Moskvoretsky Bridge which connects the Red Square in Moscow in 1987, cited Perry Rhodan's adventures as his main inspiration for penetrating Soviet airspace.

The Perry Rhodan issue that went into space. Credit: ESA/André Kuipers

Dutch ESA astronaut André Kuipers was inspired to become an astronaut from an early age by the Perry Rhodan albums his grandmother had bought for him, and that he eventually started buying himself from his allowance. When he finally went into space, on 18 April 2004, he brought his very first booklet along with him. It was number ten in the red series, Ruimteoorlog in de Wegasector (Space War in the Vega Sector or Raumschlacht im Wega-Sektor).

=== In music ===
Christopher Franke, former member of German electronica group Tangerine Dream and soundtrack composer for US science-fiction television series Babylon 5, released Perry Rhodan Pax Terra in 1996, composed of music inspired by the Perry Rhodan epic.

The German group The Psychedelic Avengers have said that they were inspired by Perry Rhodan on their 2004 release And the Curse of the Universe. Another group, Sensus, released a song "Perry Rhodan .. More Than A Million Lightyears From Home" in 1986 a presented it at the Worldcon in Saarbrücken.

=== In video games ===
In 1995, the Czech computer adventure video game Mise Quadam was created based on the motifs of the series. In 2008, was released the computer game The Immortals of Terra: A Perry Rhodan Adventure (Rhodan: Myth of the Illochim).

=== In anglophone science fiction fandom ===
Bubonicon, an annual science fiction convention in Albuquerque, New Mexico adopted "Perry Rhodent" as its mascot, a rat wearing only one shoe (or boot). Perry's image is reinvented each year for the convention's program and T-shirts, often by the convention's Artist Guest of Honor.

== Selected writers ==
=== Past writers ===
- Kurt Brand
- Clark Darlton
- Andreas Findig
- H. G. Francis
- Hanns Kneifel
- Kurt Mahr
- K. H. Scheer

=== Guest writers ===
- Andreas Eschbach
- Gisbert Haefs
- Markus Heitz
