= The Mad Bomberg (1932 film) =

1932 film directed by Georg Asagaroff

- Directed by: Georg Asagaroff
- Written by: Curt J. Braun
- Based on: The Mad Bomberg by Josef Winckler
- Produced by: Óscar Dancigers; Dagobert Koßmann
- Starring: Hans Adalbert Schlettow; Liselotte Schaak; Paul Heidemann; Adele Sandrock
- Cinematography: Carl Drews
- Music by: P.J. Haslinde
- Production company: Deuton-Film
- Release date: 29 March 1932
- Running time: 92 minutes
- Country: Germany
- Language: German

The Mad Bomberg (German: Der tolle Bomberg) is a 1932 German comedy film directed by Georg Asagaroff and starring Hans Adalbert Schlettow, Liselotte Schaak, and Paul Heidemann. It is an adaptation of the 1923 novel The Mad Bomberg by Josef Winckler, which was later made into a 1957 film of the same title. The film's art direction was by Otto Erdmann and Hans Sohnle.

== Synopsis ==
Wealthy eccentric Baron Giesbert von Bomberg is forced by his relatives to get married. Gradually he begins to fall in love with his wife.

== Cast ==
- Hans Adalbert Schlettow as Baron Giesbert v. Bomberg
- Liselotte Schaak as Sophie, seine Frau
- Paul Heidemann as Dachs, Diener
- Adele Sandrock as Herzogin Looz v. Curswaren
- Hansi Arnstaedt as Frau v. Gutelager
- Lizzi Natzler as Fiffi, Zofe
- Vivian Gibson as Tänzerin
- Paul Henckels as Professor Landois
- Charles Puffy as Jean Matin
- Hans Wassmann as Gerichtsvollzieher
- Georges Boulanger as Ein bekannter Geiger
- Wolf Roon as Leutnant Werner
- Hertha Guthmar as Sophies Freundin
- Helen Schöner as Bombergs Verwandte
- Emmy Wyda as Bombergs Verwandte
- Hugo Werner-Kahle as Bombergs Verwandter
- Ferdinand von Alten as Bombergs Verwandter
- Arthur Bergen as Bombergs Verwandter
- Antonie Jaeckel
- Walter Steinbeck
- Bernhard Goetzke
- Josef Peterhans
- Edgar Pauly
- Max Vierlinger
- Edmund Pouch
- Anton Krilla
- Bernhard Perponché
- O. Pfahl
- Martha von Konssatzki

== Bibliography ==
- Waldman, Harry (2008). Nazi Films in America, 1933–1942. Jefferson, NC: McFarland. ISBN 978-0-7864-3861-7.
