= Rochlitzer Berg =

Mountain in Germany

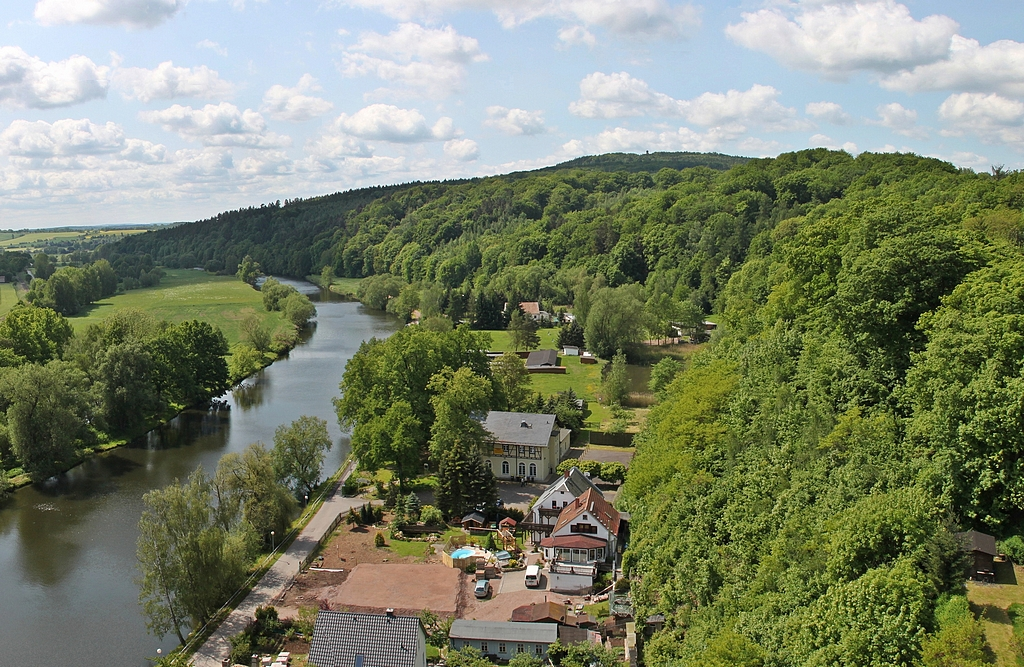
- View from Rochlitz Castle along Zwickauer Mulde towards Rochlitzer Berg

Highest point
- Elevation: 353 m (1,158 ft)
- Coordinates: 51°01′36″N 12°46′15″E

Geography
- Location within Saxony
- Location: Saxony, Germany
- Parent range: Central Saxon Hills

Rochlitzer Berg is a mountain of volcanic origin in Saxony, southeastern Germany. It is situated south-west of the town of Rochlitz on the river Zwickauer Mulde. Its elevation is variously given as 348.9 m NHN, 348 m HN or 353 m NN. The mountain is also known as Rochlitzer Collm.

== Geology ==
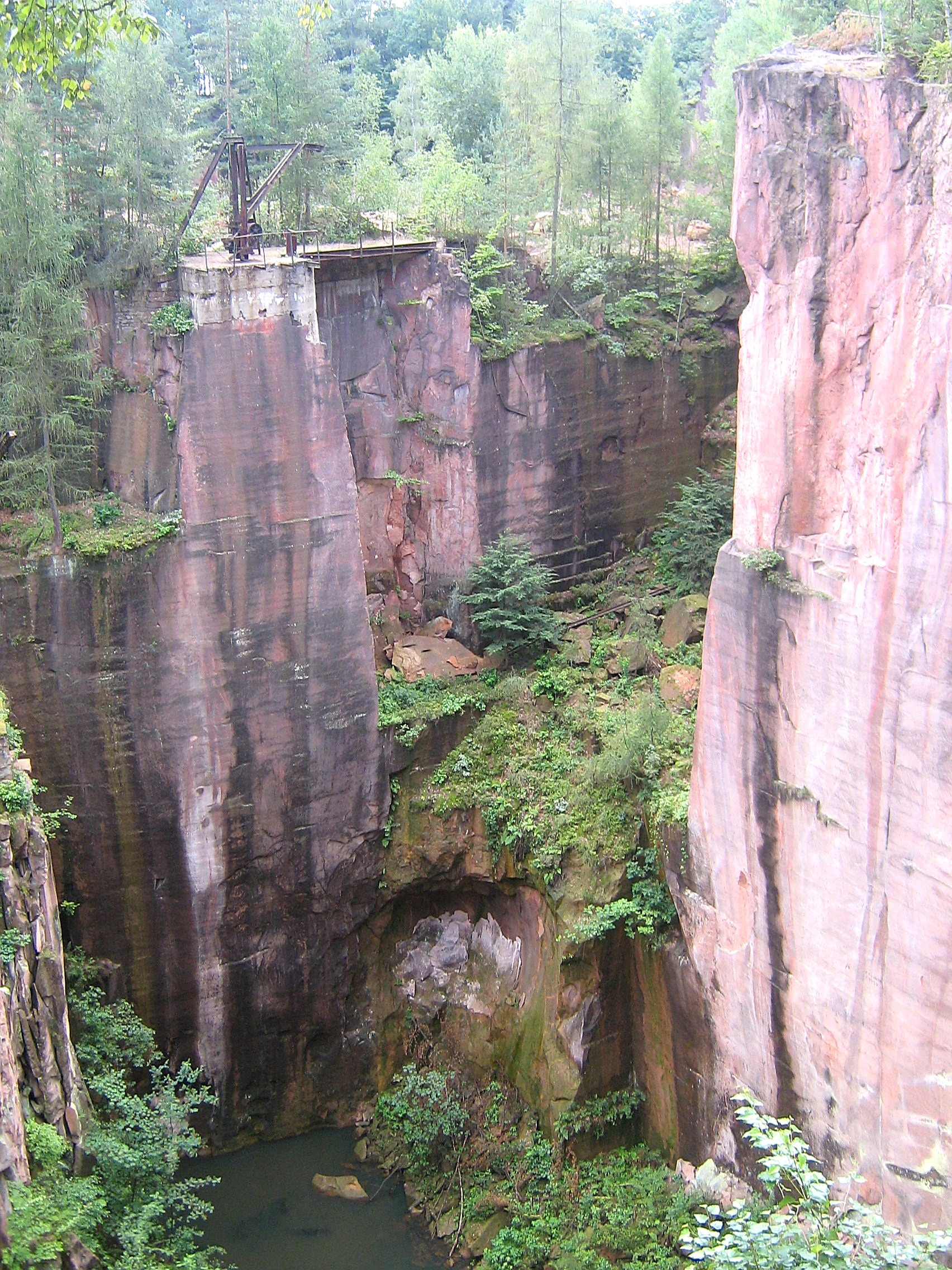
Seidelbruch, a former quarry on Rochlitzer Berg

The so-called Rochlitzer Porphyr, a rhyolitic tuff, which makes up a large part of the mountain, was formed from deposits of late explosive eruptions of a volcano about 250 million years ago. The colour of the rock is usually reddish to reddish-violet, occasionally also reddish brown to beige. Its texture is grainy and marked by many pore-like cavities (macro-pores). While the designation as "porphyry" has been passed down through history and is commonly used, it is petrographically incorrect.

The tuff rock has been used since roughly a thousand years all over the region, also by Renaissance master builders Arnold von Westfalen and Hieronymus Lotter. The latter used it for the Old Town Hall in Leipzig and Augustusburg castle. More recently, it was used for facing of Stadthalle Chemnitz and the Peasants' War Panorama near Bad Frankenhausen.

Tuff was mined in up to 10 individual quarries. Since 1879 Vereinigte Porphyrbrüche auf dem Rochlitzer Berge ("United Porphyry Quarries on Rochlitzer Berg") have been responsible for the operations. Explosives have been used only since 1991 in the last operating quarry. The amount of rock to be quarried is limited for reasons of nature and landscape protection.

The tuff rock of Rochlitzer Berg has been named in May 2006 as one of the 77 most important national geotopes on Germany by the Academy of Geosciences in Hannover. According to a ballot led by Heinz Sielmann Foundation in 2012, "Rochlitz Porphyry" is the fourth most beautiful natural wonder in Germany.

== Tourism ==
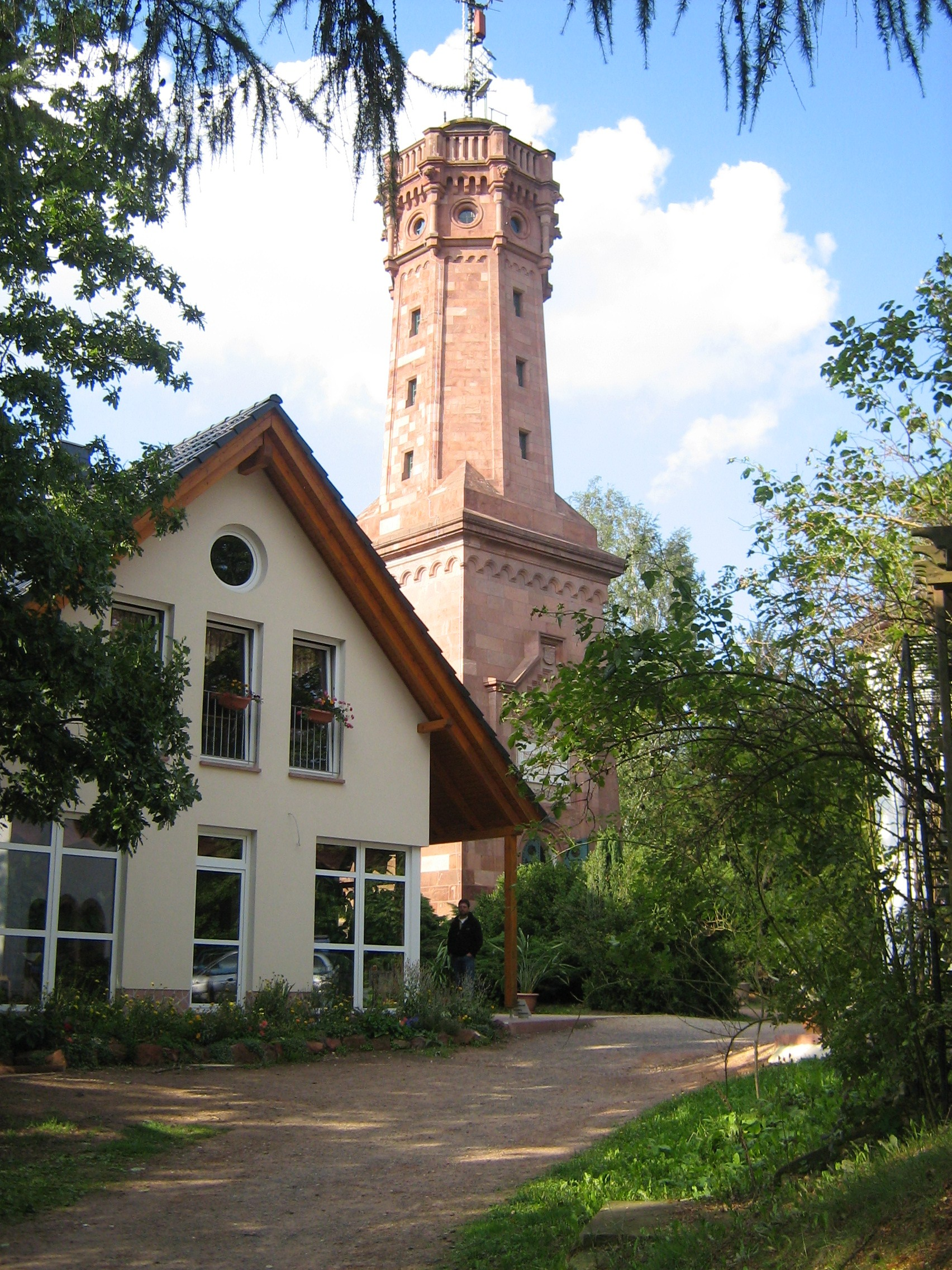
Friedrich-August-Turm (observation tower) and the new restaurant

An instructional hiking path documenting the history of quarrying has been established on a circular route on and around Rochlitzer Berg. It offers views into the former quarries which are up to 50 m deep. A 3 km long hiking path connects the mountain with Rochlitz Castle.

A viewpoint on the southern side of the mountain offers views towards Chemnitz. If the weather is favourable, the crest of the Ore Mountains with Fichtelberg mountain can also be seen.

A memorial stone, commemorating the return of King Frederick Augustus I of Saxony from Prussian captivity after the Battle of the Nations, was erected in 1815 at the instigation of quarry owner Seidel and other sponsors.

The observation tower Friedrich-August-Turm, designed by the well-known Freiberg art master Eduard Heuchler and erected in 1860, was dedicated to king Frederick Augustus II of Saxony who died in an accident in 1854. In the 1860s it served as a first-order station No. 17 of the Royal Saxon Triangulation. The stone column with the benchmark is still preserved on the observation platform.

A restaurant has existed on Rochlitzer Berg since 1861, the current restaurant Türmerhaus ("Tower Watchman's House") was newly built in 2002. It can be reached from the parking lot by a short walk uphill.

== Events ==
The music event Performance zum Stein takes place every year in one of the former quarries, where Mittelsächsische Philharmonie and other bodies of sound present classical and experimental pieces.

The local sports club VfA (Verein für Ausdauersport) Rochlitzer Berg e.V. organises yearly footraces on New Year's Day and on the Sundays next to the spring equinox and the autumn equinox over distances of 3.5, 10.5, and 21 km (the latter only in autumn).
