= Johann Andreas Eisenbarth =

German surgeon (1663–1727)

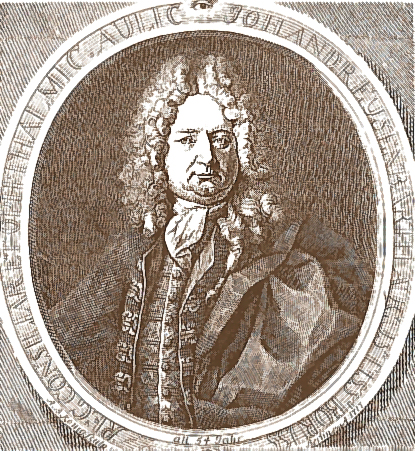
Johann Andreas Eisenbarth (1717)

Johann Andreas Eisenbarth (March 27, 1663 – November 11, 1727 in Hann. Münden) was a German surgeon who was a native of Oberviechtach, Bavaria.

Eisenbarth was an oculist and barber-surgeon who specialized in treatment of cataracts, calculus surgery, and the treatment of bone fractures. His grandfather and father were also surgeons, and much of Eisenbarth's medical knowledge was learned from his brother-in-law. Although he was referred to as "Dr. Eisenbarth", he had no formal medical credentials, nor was he officially awarded the title "Doctor". Despite this, he was considered a skilled surgeon, and was bestowed with privileges by members of German royalty.

Eisenbarth was a "travelling surgeon", and his journeys took him throughout most of Germany. He usually travelled with a large entourage of up to 120 persons. This group included entertainers, harlequins and musicians performing in a carnival-like atmosphere while Eisenbarth plied his trade. The spectacle drew large crowds, and the loud music and revelry helped drown out the cries of pain from his patients.

Eisenbarth designed his own medical instruments, including a cataract needle and a polypus hook. From his home in Magdeburg, the Zum goldenen Apfel, he manufactured and marketed his own medicine, selling his homemade remedies on a large scale.

Around 1800, a student drinking song called "Ich bin der Doktor Eisenbarth" (My Name is Doctor Eisenbarth) unfairly mocking the memory of the doctor ("I can make the blind walk and the lame see") became popular in Germany, and more recently, author Eike Pies published a book titled Ich bin der Doktor Eisenbarth. In his home town of Oberviechtach, there is the "Eisenbarth Fountain", commemorating his work. Also, a pharmacy in Oberviechtach sells a product called "Eisenbarth elixir", and a 1977 German postage stamp features his visage.

== Song ==
Today, Johann Andreas Eisenbarth is still widely known because about 70 years after his death a Göttingen student, of whom only the beer name Perceo ("dwarf" or "Kleinwüchsiger") is known, wrote a drinking song, the first line of which reads: "Ich bin der Doktor Eisenbarth" ("I am the Doctor Eisenbarth"). As a student song, text and melody made their way through the student associations of the German universities in numerous variations from about 1800; in 1815 a variant was printed for the first time in a commercial book. This song, in turn, inspired various authors to write novels to this day (Agnes Harder, 1897; Josef Winckler, 1928; Otto Weddigen, 1909; Fritz Nölle, 1940; Hanns Kneifel, 2002), plays (for example Otto Falckenberg, 1908), operas (Alfred Böckmann and Pavel Haas) and Nico Dostal's operetta Doktor Eisenbart. The school opera Der Arzt auf dem Marktplatz by Hanna and Siegfried Stolte, written in the 1950s in the GDR, was also based on motifs from the life of Doctor Eisenbarth.

== Literature ==
- Arthur Kopp: Eisenbart im Leben und im Liede. Berlin 1900 Internet Archive.
- Arthur Kopp: Neues über den Doktor Eisenbart. In: Zeitschrift für Bücherfreunde 7,1 (1903–1904), S. 217–226 Internet Archive.
