= Ein Mann, der sich Kolumbus nannt =

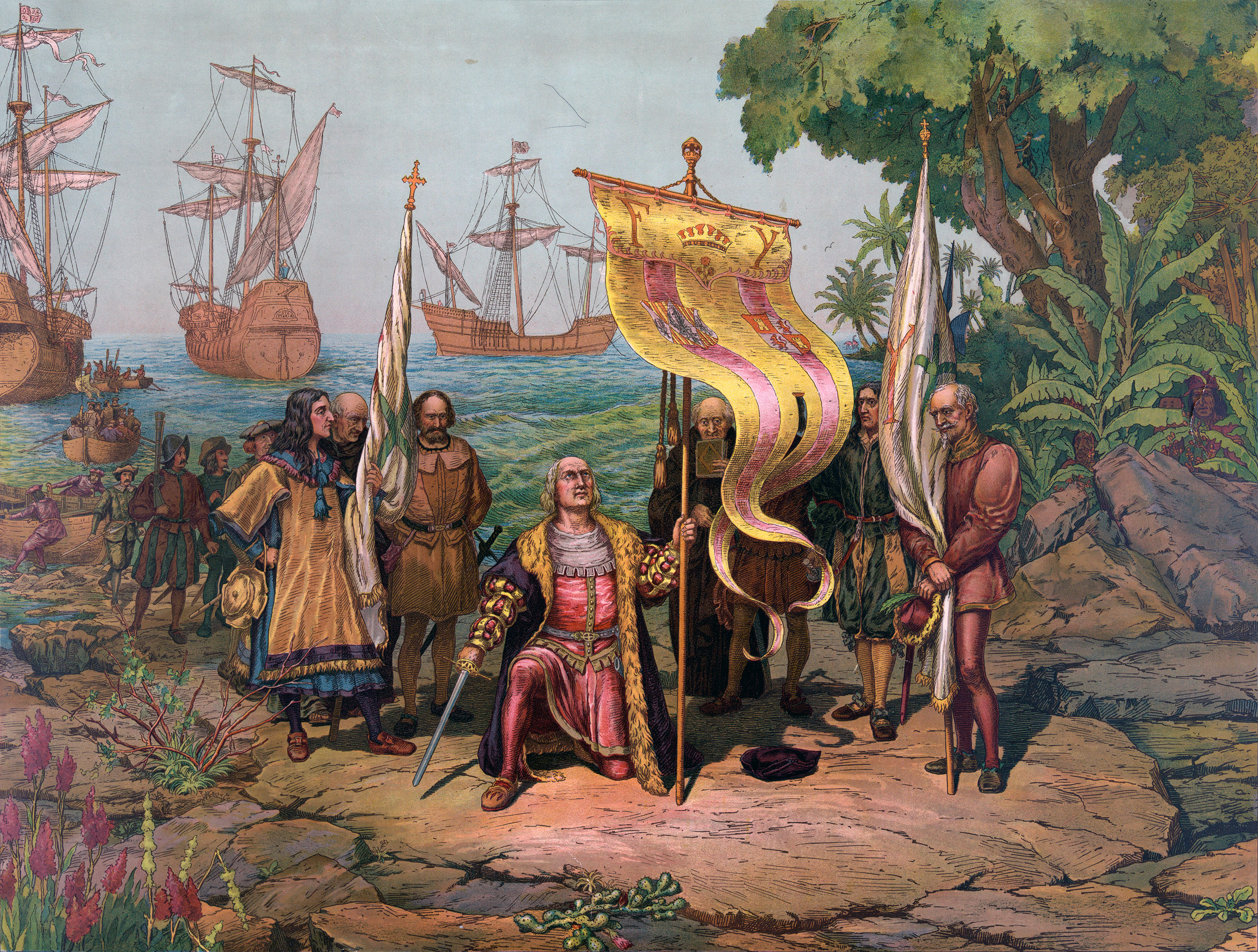
Columbus taking possession of the new country (1893 illustration, Prang Educational Company)

"Ein Mann, der sich Kolumbus nannt" (A man who called himself Columbus) is a German folk or children's song. The text by an unknown author set to a melody based on "Ich bin der Doktor Eisenbart", it was first published in book of humorous songs Der Pott in 1936. The song tells of the first landing in the Americas by Christopher Columbus. Immediately after its first publication, it was widely used in publications of National Socialist organizations. Even after World War II it found its way into German children's song books.

The song consists of six verses.

== Text ==
Ein Mann, der sich Kolumbus nannt,
widewidewitt bum bum,
war in der Schiffahrt wohl bekannt,
widewidewitt bum bum.
Es drückten ihn die Sorgen schwer,
er suchte neues Land im Meer.
Refrain
Gloria viktoria, widewidewitt juchheirassa,
Gloria viktoria, widewidewitt bum, bum.

Als er den Morgenkaffee trank,
da rief er fröhlich: "Gott sei Dank!"
Denn schnell kam mit dem ersten Tram
der spansche König zu ihm an.
Refrain

"Kolumbus", sprach er "lieber Mann,
du hast schon manche Tat getan.
Eins fehlt noch unserer Gloria:
entdecke mir Amerika!"
Refrain

Gesagt, getan, ein Mann, ein Wort,
am selben Tag fuhr er noch fort.
Und eines Morgens schrie er: "Land!!
Wie deucht mir alles so bekannt."
Refrain

Das Volk an Land stand stumm und zag.
Da sagt Kolumbus: "Guten Tag!
Ist hier vielleicht Amerika?"
Da schrien alle Wilden: "Ja!!!"
Refrain

Die Wilden waren sehr erschreckt
und schrien all': "Wir sind entdeckt!"
Der Häuptling rief ihm "Lieber Mann,
alsdann bist du Kolumbus dann!"
Refrain

A man, who called himself Columbus,
widewidewitt bum bum,
was a well known sailor,
widewidewitt bum bum.
Weighed down by sorrows,
he sought new land on the sea.
Refrain

As he drank his morning coffee,
he cried out happily "Thank God!"
because quickly on the first tram
arrived the Spanish King.
Refrain

"Columbus", he said "My dear fellow,
you have already done great things.
One feat lacks in our glory:
discover America for me!"
Refrain

So it was said, so it was done, one man, one word,
on the very same day he set forth.
And one morning he cried "Land Ho!
How everything seems so familiar to me!
Refrain

The natives on land stood quietly and timidly.
Then Columbus said "Good day!
Is this place perhaps America?"
Then all the savages yelled "Yes!"
Refrain

The savages were very frightened
and all cried out "We've been discovered!"
The chieftain shouted "Dear fellow,
then you must be Columbus!"
Refrain
