= Rochlitz Castle =

Castle in Saxony, Germany

Coordinates: 51°2′42″N 12°47′29″E

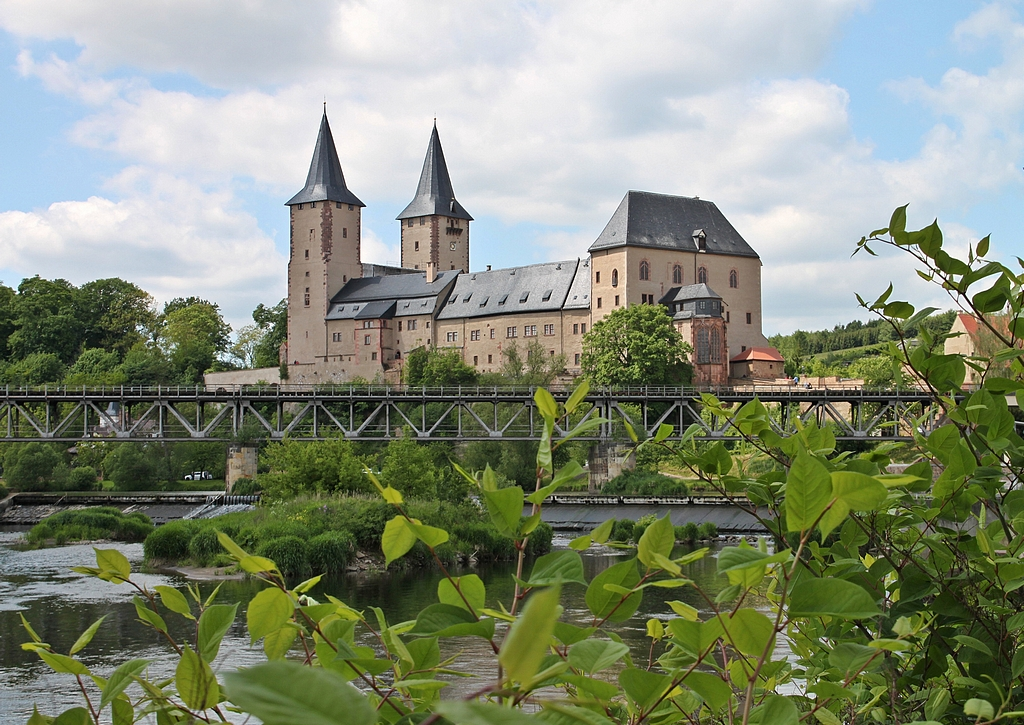
Rochlitz Castle from the southeast

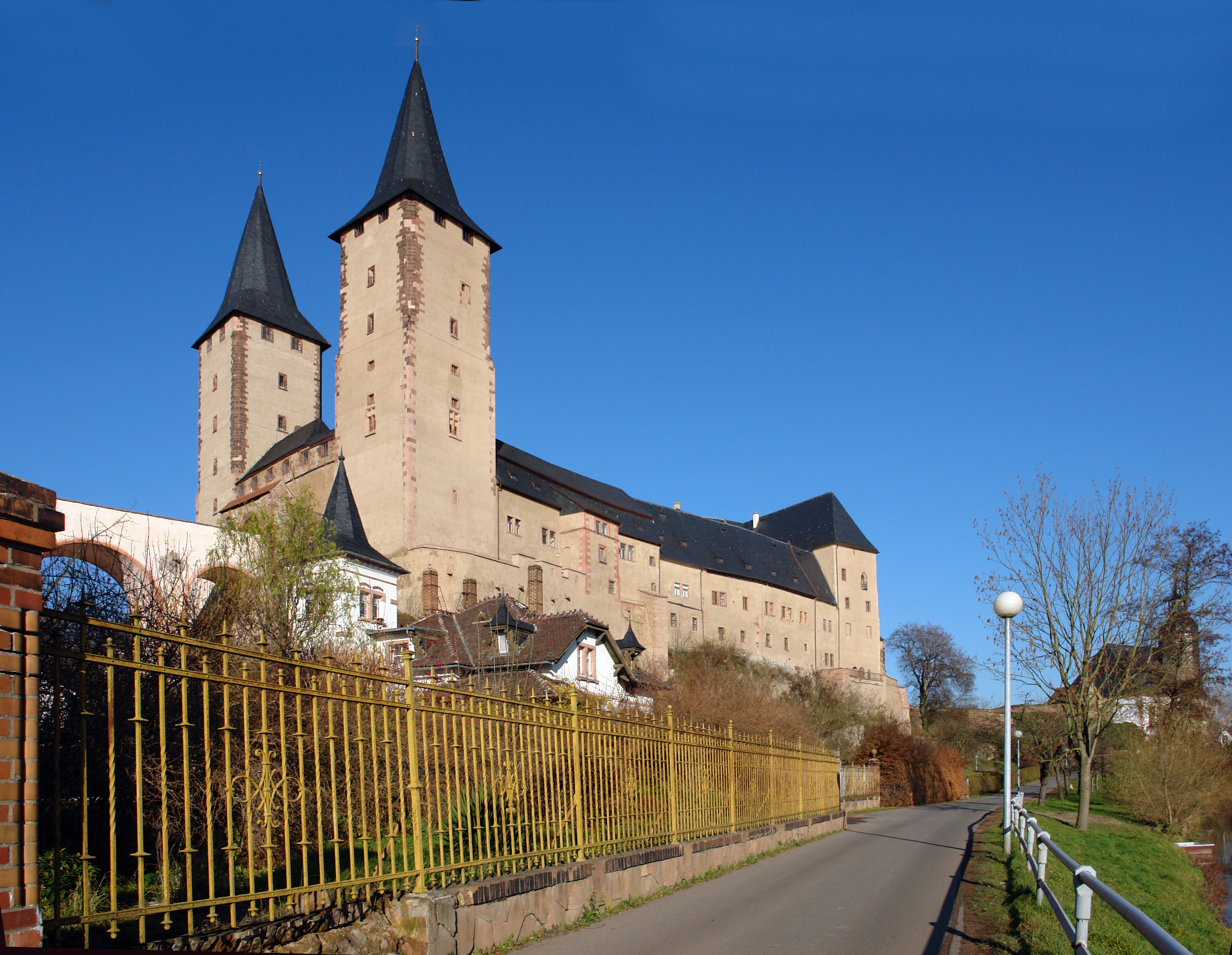
Rochlitz Castle: view from the southwest with its characteristic towers of "Finstere Jupe" (left) and "Lichte Jupe" (right)

Rochlitz Castle or Rochlitz Palace (German: Schloss Rochlitz) lies in the west of the town of Rochlitz in the county of Mittelsachsen in the Free State of Saxony. It was built on the site of an imperial castle, erected in the second half of the 10th century, which fell into the possession of the Wettin margraves in 1143. Its appearance, which includes several Romanesque wings, is considerably influenced by its remodelling into a margravial schloss in the fourth quarter of the 14th century. Further conversions and additions followed at the end of the 15th and in the 16th centuries, when the castle became a secondary residenz, dower house and hunting lodge for the Wettin family. The castle or palace was the residence for members of the Saxon princely house eight times. From the 18th century the castle served as an administrative centre (justice department and district court); in 1852 it became a gaol, which necessitated considerable alteration. The museum founded in 1892 was gradually expanded and, today, takes up almost the entire castle.

== Location ==
The palace lies southwest of the historic town centre of Rochlitz on a spur of the Rochlitzer Berg that descends gradually towards the east-northeast and is flanked by the Zwickau Mulde to the southeast and the Hellerbach stream to the northwest. The hill spur is divided into the Nosswitz castle hill in the west, which at 200 m above sea level (NN) is noticeably higher and covers an area of about 300 metres by 60 metres, and the Rochlitz castle hill with the palace complex (about 90 × 30–40 m), separated by a late medieval neck ditch. The main palace is further separated by ditches from the western lower bailey (the so-called Unterschloss) and the eastern lower bailey (Vorburg) with St. Peter's Church and a total length of about 220 × 40 m.

360 degree panorama of the inner courtyard of Rochlitz Castle -. From left to right: western part of the south wing, behind it the south tower "Lichte Juppe", the west gate above it the west corridor, the stable house, north tower "Finstere Juppe" (with the turret's flat), north corridor, prince's house (including the banqueting hall), transept and east gate (with the middle room and office as well as the castle chapel), south wing (with the duke's room, palace and large castle kitchen)

== Literature ==
- Stefan Reuther: Bautätigkeit auf Schloss Rochlitz in der zweiten Hälfte des 15. Jahrhunderts, in: Schlossbau der Spätgotik in Mitteldeutschland. Tagungsband. Dresden, 2007, pp. 146–154.
- Udo Baumbach: Schloss Rochlitz. Fürstliche Residenz, Witwensitz, Verbannungsort. Sachsens schönste Schlösser, Burgen und Gärten 14 (Leipzig, 2002), ISBN 3-361-00549-3.
- Roman Grabolle: Keramik von der Burg Rochlitz (Sachsen). In: Ottonische Keramik. Waren und Formen des 10. Jahrhunderts aus Nord-, Ost- und Mitteldeutschland, Pommern, Schlesien und Böhmen. Zum aktuellen Stand der Forschung. Workshop dated 18-19 June 2001 at the Liberal Arts Centre for the History and Culture of Eastern Central Europe, Leipzig (Leipzig, 2001).
- Udo Baumbach: Schloss Rochlitz. Ein Führer durch Burg, Museum und Geschichte. Stätten sächsischer Kunst und Geschichte (Beucha, 1995), ISBN 3-930076-10-1 (The accounts of the architectural history in the Middle Ages are already partly superseded by current architectural research).
- 1000 Jahre Rochlitz. Festschrift (Beucha 1995), ISBN 3-930076-16-0.
- André Thieme: Burg, Herrschaft und Amt Rochlitz im Mittelalter. Historische Entwicklung und herrschaftliche Strukturen einer spätmittelalterlich-frühneuzeitlichen wettinischen Nebenresidenz (Witwensitz), in: Witwenschaft in der Frühen Neuzeit. Fürstliche und adlige Witwen zwischen Fremd- und Selbstbestimmung, ed. by Martina Schattkowsky (Schriften zur sächsischen Geschichte und Volkskunde, Vol 6), Leipzig, 2003, pp. 35-64.
- Frank Schmidt: Schloss Rochlitz (Leipzig, 2013), ISBN 3-361-00688-0.
