= The Immortals of Terra: A Perry Rhodan Adventure =

2008 video game

- Developer: Braingame
- Publishers: EU: Koch Media; NA: Viva Media
- Platform: Microsoft Windows
- Release: GER: February 29, 2008; EU: May 23, 2008; NA: July 3, 2008
- Genre: Adventure

The Immortals of Terra: A Perry Rhodan Adventure, known in the United Kingdom as Rhodan: Myth of the Illochim, is an adventure game developed by Braingame and published by Koch Media and Viva Media for Microsoft Windows in 2008.

== Critical reception ==
Reception

Aggregate score
Aggregator	Score
Metacritic	63/100

Review scores
Publication	Score
4Players	83%
Adventure Gamers	4/5
Eurogamer	8/10
Gamekult	7/10
GameSpot	5.5/10
GameZone	5.9/10
IGN	5.8/10
Jeuxvideo.com	16/20
PC Gamer (US)	67%
PC Zone	62%

The game received "mixed" reviews according to the review aggregation website Metacritic.

4Players wrote: "I didn't think that Perry Rhodan would be so much fun for me. It's not just an adventure for novel fans, but a full-fledged adventure made in Germany. It's done very professionally and [it] doesn't have to hide from Star Wars, Star Trek and [the like]." Jeuxvideo.com wrote, "Adapting a work from its original medium to a new medium is often a perilous undertaking, as experience has repeatedly demonstrated. However, Perry Rhodan comes out of it with honors, switching from paper to silicone with brilliance. True to the spirit of the saga, the game nevertheless manages to be accessible to neophytes while writing a new page that is frankly successful." Eurogamer wrote, "It's one of the richest, most cohesive entries in the point-and-click genre I've seen for a long time, and I'm a little sad that it didn't come out fifteen years ago. Just think of all the sequels we could've had by now." Adventure Gamers wrote, "It's an auspicious debut that should appeal to sci-fi adventure fans, even if you're not familiar with the American astronaut and his 'Perryverse'."

Gamekult wrote: "All in all [...] Perry Rhodan and his rich and varied universe turn out to be a pleasant surprise in a sometimes sad genre." PC Gamer wrote, "With the set pieces all working this well, it's a shame Immortals features such a forgettable plot with so few appealing characters." PC Zone called it "An above-average sci-fi adventure, but if you're fond of rollercoasters, join a different queue." GameZone wrote, "Only the most die-hard fans of the Perry Rhodan series will truly love this game. Others looking for a well-thought out and engaging adventure may want to look elsewhere." IGN wrote: "This adventure is only recommended for hardcore fans of the genre who don't mind zany logistical puzzles; otherwise, you should beam yourself the hell out of there." GameSpot wrote: "Even an innovative sci-fi setting can't save the illogical and boring Immortals of Terra."
