= Josef Winckler =

German writer (1881–1966)

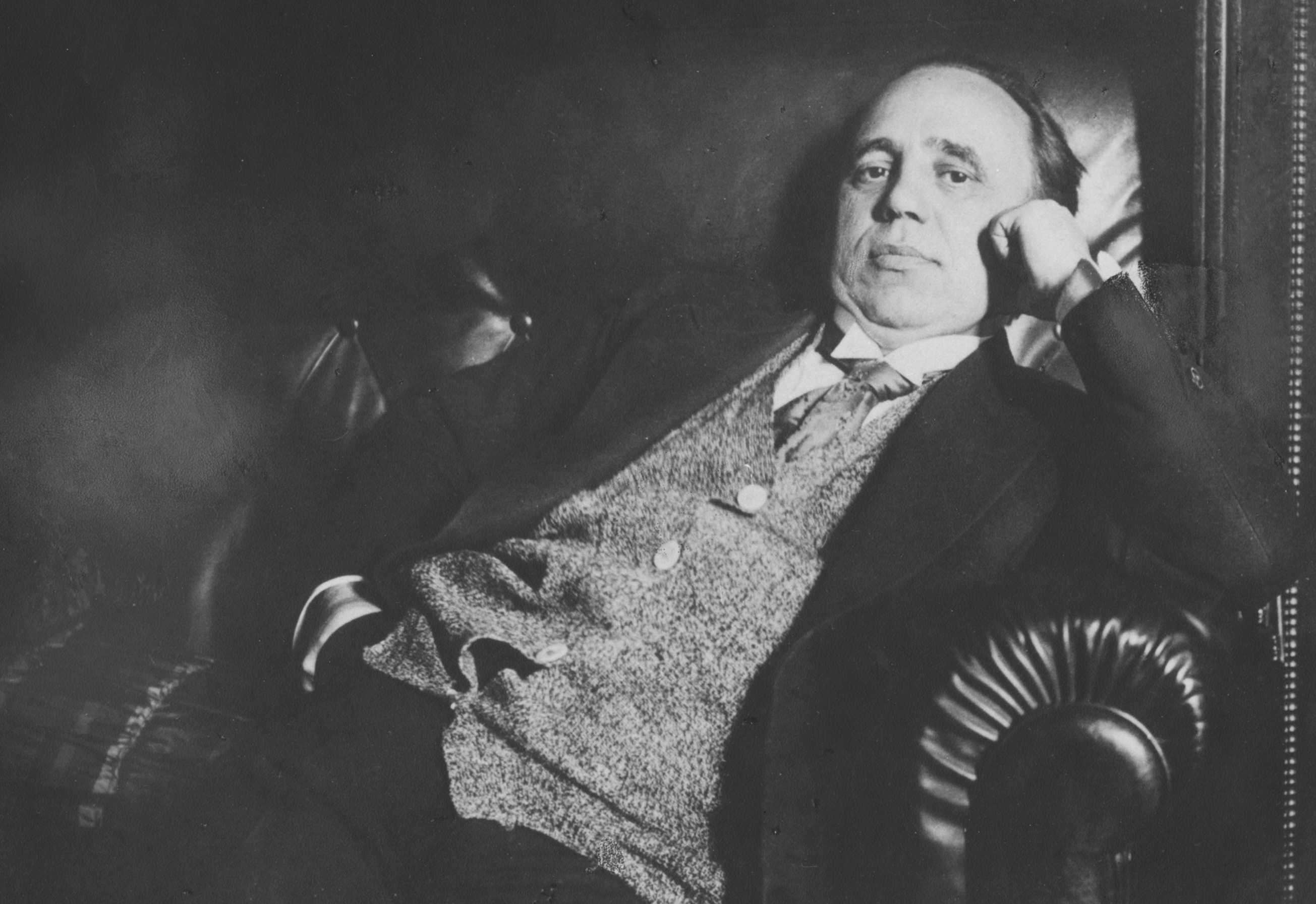
- Winckler in 1925
- Born: 7 July 1881; Bentlage (Rheine), German Empire
- Died: 29 January 1966 (aged 84); Bensberg, Bergisch Gladbach, West Germany
- Occupation: Writer

Josef Winckler (7 July 1881, Bentlage, Rheine – 29 January 1966, Bensberg, Bergisch Gladbach) was a German writer, best known for his 1923 comic novel The Mad Bomberg, which was turned into films in 1932 and 1957. One of his other popular novels was Doctor Eisenbart (1929), based on the life of Johann Andreas Eisenbarth.
