= The Mad Bomberg (novel) =

1923 novel by Josef Winckler

- 1954 edition
- Author: Josef Winckler
- Original title: Der tolle Bomberg
- Language: German
- Genre: Historical novel
- Publication date: 1923

The Mad Bomberg (German: Der tolle Bomberg) is a 1923 novel by the German writer Josef Winckler. It is loosely based on the legendary exploits of a real-life aristocrat Gisbert von Romberg (1839–1897). The novel has been adapted into films on two occasions. The first was a 1932 film The Mad Bomberg directed by Georg Asagaroff. The second The Mad Bomberg (1957), directed by Rolf Thiele, was a vehicle for the actor Hans Albers, which attempted to recreate the success of his 1943 film Münchhausen.

== Plot and Themes ==
Der tolle Bomberg is a picaresque novel that chronicles the wild, eccentric life of Baron Gisbert von Bomberg in the late 19th-century Münsterland region of Westphalia. Based loosely on a real-life aristocrat, the Baron represents a spirited defiance against boring bourgeois society.

The plot unfolds as a series of humorous and outrageous anecdotes. Bomberg's time is dominated by extravagant feasts, elaborate practical jokes, and a constant, irreverent mockery of local authorities and the church. The novel famously unites him with the equally eccentric Professor Landois, forming a pact to introduce chaos to the world. A celebrated piece of German regional humor, the book's success lies in its enthusiastic portrayal of an uninhibited, non-conformist spirit. The novel was later adapted into two feature films, notably a 1957 version starring Hans Albers.
