= Polypus =

Scientific classification
- Kingdom: Fungi
- Division: Basidiomycota
- Class: Agaricomycetes
- Order: Russulales
- Family: incertae sedis
- Genus: Polypus; Audet (2010)
- Species: P. dispansus

Binomial name
- Polypus dispansus (Lloyd) Audet (2010)

Synonyms
- Polyporus dispansus Lloyd (1912); Albatrellus dispansus (Lloyd) Canf. & Gilb. (1971); Polyporus illudens Overh. (1941)

Genus of fungi

Polypus is a fungal genus of uncertain familial placement in the order Russulales. A monotypic genus, it contains the single species Polypus dispansus, originally described by Curtis Gates Lloyd in 1912 as a species of Polyporus. Polypus was circumscribed by Serge Audet in 2010.
