= The Mad Bomberg (1957 film) =

1957 film

- Directed by: Rolf Thiele
- Written by: Hans Jacoby; Per Schwenzen
- Based on: The Mad Bomberg by Josef Winckler
- Produced by: Carola Bornée; Gero Wecker
- Starring: Hans Albers; Marion Michael; Harald Juhnke; Paul Henckels
- Cinematography: Václav Vích
- Edited by: Caspar van den Berg
- Music by: Hans-Martin Majewski
- Production company: Arca-Filmproduktion
- Distributed by: Neue Filmverleih
- Release date: August 22, 1957
- Running time: 95 minutes
- Country: West Germany
- Language: German

The Mad Bomberg (German: Der tolle Bomberg) is a 1957 West Germany comedy film directed by Rolf Thiele and starring Hans Albers, Marion Michael and Harald Juhnke. It was shot at the Göttingen Studios with sets designed by the art directors Gabriel Pellon and Peter Röhrig. The film is an adaptation of the 1923 novel of the same title by Josef Winckler which was based on a real historical Westphalian aristocrat of the nineteenth century. The film was conceived partly as an attempt to replicate the success of Albers' hit film Münchhausen (1943).

== Plot ==
Baron Gisbert von Bomberg, a wealthy and eccentric lover of practical jokes, leaves the army and returns home. He contrives to get himself out of a long-promised engagement to a woman. His relatives hope to have him declared insane so they can get their hands on his wealth. To avoid another possible marriage, von Bomberg fakes his own death.

== Cast ==
- Hans Albers as Baron Gisbert von Bomberg
- Marion Michael as Paula Mühlberg
- Harald Juhnke as Dr. Roland
- Paul Henckels as Dr. Emil Landois
- Ingeborg Christiansen as Emma, the buxom maid
- Gert Fröbe as Gustav-Eberhard Mühlberg
- Camilla Spira as Frau Kommerzienrat Mühlberg
- Ilse Künkele as Baroneß Adelheid von Twackel
- Erich Fiedler as Baron von Twackel
- Hubert von Meyerinck as Pastor
- Wanda Rotha as Editha
- Walter M. Wülf as Fuchs, the majordomo
- Herbert Hübner as Regiment Commander von Strullbach
- Otto Stoeckel as Kuno von Schnappwitz
- Thea Grodtczinsky as Mathilde von Schnappwitz
- Herbert Weissbach as Count Murveldt
- Hans Leibelt as Professor von Wetzelstien
- Margit Symo as Galina Krakowskaja
- Helga Warnecke as Aunt Laura

== Bibliography ==
- Hake, Sabine. Popular Cinema of the Third Reich. University of Texas Press, 2001.
