= Hanns Kneifel =

German science fiction writer

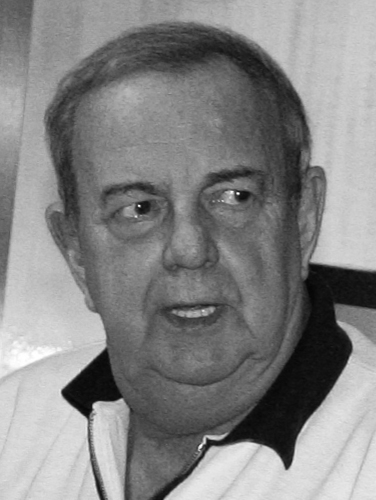
Hanns Kneifel

Hanns Kneifel (11 July 1936, Gleiwitz – 7 March 2012, Munich) was a German science fiction writer. He is best known for writing 98 Perry Rhodan episodes.
