= List of Saxon locomotives and railcars =

Flag of the Kingdom of Saxony

This list contains the locomotives and railbuses of the Royal Saxon State Railways (Königlich Saxon Staatseisenbahnen) and the locomotives of the Leipzig–Dresden Railway Company.

== Leipzig-Dresden Railway ==
The Leipzig–Dresden Railway Company (Leipzig-Dresdner Eisenbahn or LDE) started up its operations between 1837 and 1839, successively opening its sections of line, and was therefore the first German long distance railway. It remained independent for nearly three decades and was only absorbed into the Royal Saxon State Railways on 1 June 1876.

The LDE locomotives were only classified by name.

LDE name	State railway class (to 1896)	State railway number(s) (to 1892)	Quantity	Year(s) of manufacture	Type	Remarks
COLUMBUS			1	1835	B n2	Built by Winans (USA), so-called "Crab class"; given in payment for the locomotive PEGASUS in 1842
COMET and FAUST			2	1835–1837	B n2	Built by Rothwell (GB), driving wheel diameter 1372 mm; COMET rebuilt in 1842 into B1 n2, retired by 1848
BLITZ and WINDSBRAUT			2	1836–1837	B n2	Built by Rothwell (GB), driving wheel diameter 1524 mm; rebuilt in 1842 into B1 n2, retired by 1848
RENNER to GREIF			5	1837–1839	1A1 n2	Built by Kirtley (GB), retired by 1869
PETER ROTHWELL to NORDLICHT			6	1838–1840	1A1 n2	Built by Rothwell (GB), retired by 1864
ROBERT STEPHENSON			1	1838	1A1 n2	Built by Stephenson (GB), retired 1858
EDWARD BURY to PFEIL			4	1838	B n2	Built by Bury (GB), retired by 1854
SAXONIA			1	1838	B1 n2	Built by Übigau; carrying axle removed in 1840/41 (B n2), 1844 mothballed
PEGASUS			1	1839	1A1 n2	Built by the Sächsische Maschinenfabrik Co., Chemnitz, bought in 1842 after lengthy trials; retired 1862
PHÖNIX			1	1840	1A1 n2	Built by Übigau, not bought after trials
BRÜSSEL			1	1842	1A1 n2	Built by Renard (B), retired 1860
DRESDEN to RIESA			3	1844–1846	1B n2	Built by Hawthorn (GB), retired by 1867
WURZEN and OSCHATZ			2	1847	1B n2	Built by Borsig, retired by 1868
ELBE to HAYN			5	1848–1849	1A1 n2	Built by Borsig, retired by 1868
RICHARD HARTMANN to ZWICKAU			3	1849	1A1 n2	Built by Hartmann, retired by 1868
COMET to SAALE	B II from 1886: B IIa	613–626	14	1852–1859	1B n2	Mixed traffic locomotives, built by Borsig
HAMBURG to BREMEN			4	1854	1A1 n2	Passenger train locomotives, built by Borsig; 1873–1876 in B1 n2t and B1n2 rebuilt
SAXONIA to ALTHEN	H VIa, B VIa	544–571	28	1856–1868	1A1 n2	Express train locomotives, built by Hartmann and Borsig
BORSDORF to ZITTAU	K III from 1885: K II	584–603	20	1866–1868	1B n2	Mixed traffic locomotives, built by Esslingen
MOLDAU to MULDE	K III from 1885: K II	604–612	9	1874–1875	1B n2	Mixed traffic locomotives, built by Esslingen
MANNHEIM to DOLDENHORN	K V, Sigl V, Hsch V	514-543	30	1868–1876	C n2	Goods train locomotives, built by Esslingen, Sigl and Henschel
Nos. 3 to 6	W VII T	628–631	4	1874	B n2t	Shunting locomotives, built by Wöhlert
MEISSEN to WILHELM SEYFFERTH	Hsch VI	572–583	12	1875–1876	1B n2	Express train locomotives, built by Henschel
GROSSENHAIN I and GROSSENHAIN II	St II T	635–636	(2)	(1856)	1B n2t	Taken over in 1869 with the Großenhain–Priestewitz branch; appeared in 1856 as a rebuild of the Bavarian E.
Nos. 7 to 9	B IIa T	632–634	(3)	(1873–1875)	B1 n2t	Rebuilt from 1A1 locomotives by Borsig, built in 1854
BREMEN	B II	627	(1)	(1875)	B1 n2t	Rebuilt from 1A1 locomotives by Borsig, built in 1854

== Royal Saxon State Railways ==
=== Description of the Locomotives ===
Initially all locomotives were classified by name as was common practice. This was usual on all engines up to 1892. From 1893 to 1900 only passenger and express train locomotives still carried name plates. Thereafter name plates on all locomotives, apart from old shunting and branch line engines, were removed.

Specific groups of names were supposed to be allocated to the different classes (e.g. rivers, alpine peaks, American cities).

In addition to their names the locomotives were given 'list numbers' (Listennummern or Bahnnummern) that were also displayed on the engines from 1869 onwards. A new numbering scheme was introduced in 1892, which attempted to bring in some sort of orderly system. However it was not successful.

Because this system was confusing and impractical with the ever-rising quantity of locomotives, in 1869 a system of distinguishing between the individual classes was introduced in 1869. This system was based on an abbreviation of the manufacturer's name and a Roman numeral for each type of locomotive.

Only two years later this system was changed and the numbers were used to classify engines based on specific wheel arrangements, the manufacturer's abbreviations being retained. In addition the letters "a" (for alt = 'old') and "b" (for neu = 'new') were added.

Class	Type
I	1B with Long Boiler from 1845
II	1B with Long Boiler from 1845
III	1B with Long Boiler from 1852
IIIa	1B with low firebox, built in 1853
IIIb	1B passenger train locomotives, built in 1871
IV	1'B locomotives for mountain routes (including tank engines), from 1856
Va and V	C goods train locomotives from 1855
VI	1B fast stopping (Eilzug) locomotives from 1858
VIa	1A1 locomotives from 1848
VII	B mixed traffic locomotives from 1868
VIII	2'B locomotives from 1857

Later on, there were further changes to the classification system. Letters were introduced to indicate locomotive classes as follows:

- F for Fairlie locomotives (from 1885)
- M for Meyer locomotives (from 1889)
- Kl for Klose locomotives (from 1889)

and as supplementary information (after the class number):

- T for tank locomotives (from 1876)
- K for 750-mm narrow gauge locomotives (sometimes also in front of the class number)
- S for Sekundärbahn locomotives (from 1884)
- O for omnibus train locomotives (from 1885)
- C for compound (Verbund) locomotives (from 1887), replaced by...
- $\mathfrak{V}$ for compound locomotives (from 1889)
- M for metre gauge locomotives
- $\mathfrak{H}$ for superheated locomotives.

In 1885 the supplementary letter "b" was given the meaning 'movable carrying axle'. The last major reorganisation of the classification system took place in 1896. The manufacturer's name was dropped. New classes of express train and goods train locomotives were given even class numbers and goods train, branch line and shunting locomotives were given odd numbers. Narrow gauge locomotives were given new class designations beginning with I. Locomotives of the same class however with different driving wheel diameters were given the additional number 1 (express train locomotives) and 2 (passenger train locomotives).

=== Steam locomotives ===
==== Early locomotives for all types of train ====
Class	Railway number(s)	DRG number(s)	Quantity	Year(s) of manufacture	Type	Remarks
Saxonia to Tiger				1842–1843	1B n2	Only in service with the Saxon-Bavarian and Saxon-Bohemian Railways, not given a class number
I				1844–1852	1B n2	Various types, even rebuilt to tank locomotives, formerly classified as St I, St I (ex St II), St II (ex St III), St IIT, C I, B I, B II, H I (H IT), K I (K IT),
B IIaT				1854	1A1 n2 B1 n2	Rebuilt into B1 n2, one locomotive classified as B II
IIa				1851–1859	1B n2	Various types, even rebuilt to tank locomotives, formerly classified as H II (H IIT/H IIaT), H III, B IIa (B III, B II), B II (B IV, B III), W II (W I, W III)
IIIa				1853	1B n2	Formerly classified as: B IIIa (B V), W IIIa (W), H IIIa (H III)

==== Passenger and express train locomotives ====
Class (from 1896)	Railway number(s) (from 1892)	DRG number(s)	Quantity	Year(s) of manufacture	Type	Remarks
VIa	8–10		3	1861–1862	1A1 n2	Originally Class H VI, from 1868: H VIa
VIa	1–7, 11–16		28	1856–1868	1A1 n2	Originally classes H VI a and B VIa; taken over in 1876 along with the LDE
VI	17–51		41	1860–1870	1B n2	Originally classes H VI and B VI
VI	54–59		6	1874	1B n2	Originally Class Hsch VI; taken over in 1876 with the Saxon section of the former Berlin-Dresden Railway
VI	60–71		12	1875–1876	1B n2	Originally Class Hsch VI; taken over in 1876 with the LDE
VIb	52–53		(2)	(1885)	1′B n2	Rebuilt from Class H VI with Nowotny bogie, new class H VIb
VIII 1, to 1900: VIIIb	93–100, from 1914: 99–100		8	1870	2′B n2	Originally Class K II, from 1871: K VIII, from 1885: K VIIIb
III	201–273	34 7611	87	1871–1873	1B n2	Originally classes H IIIb and K IIIb, from 1885: H III and K III; 14 units rebuilt in 1885 into 1'B n2 as Class K IIIb
IIIb	274–287	52 7001	(14)	(1885)	1′B n2	Rebuilt from Class K III with Nowotny bogie, new Class K IIIb
IIIb	288–491	34 7701–7702, 34 7721–7807	204	1873–1901	1′B n2	Originally Schw IIIb, H IIIb and Hsch IIIb; Nos. 310–319 taken over in 1876 with the Muldenthal Railway; Nos. 335–337 taken over in 1876 with the Zwickau-Falkenstein Railway; Nos. 338–345 taken over in 1876 with the Chemnitz-Komotau Railway; No. 485 taken over in 1896 with the Altenburg-Zeitz Railway; Nos. 486–491 taken over with the Zittau-Reichenberg Railway
VIb V	161–174	34 8011	14	1886–1890	1′B n2v	Originally Class H VIb, from 1887: H VIb C, from 1889: H VIb V
IIIb V	501–518	34 7901–7902	18	1889–1892	1′B n2v	Originally Class H IIIb V
VIII 2, to 1900: VIIIb 2	101–120	13 7001–7012	20	1891–1894	2′B n2	Originally Class H VIIIb
VIII V1, to 1900: VIIIb V1	121–140	13 7101–7112	20	1896–1897	2′B n2v	
VIII V1, to 1900: VIIIb V1	141–152	13 1501–1511	12	1900	2′B n2v	
VIII V2, to 1900: VIIIb V2	519–636	36 901–919, 36 921–948, 36 951–1014	118	1896–1902	2′B n2v	
X V	175–176, from 1902: 181–195	14 201–215	15	1900–1903	2′B1′ n4v	
XII H	1–6	17 601–606	6	1906	2′C h4	
XII HV	7–14, 22–55	17 701–755	42	1908–1914	2′C h4v	
XII H1	15–21	17 801–804	7	1909	2′C h2	
X H1	81–98	14 301–317	18	1909–1913	2′B1 h2	
XII H2	651–697, from 1918: 3651–3809	38 201–324	159	1910–1922	2′C h2	
XII H2		38 325–334	10	1927	2′C h2	Copy, delivered with DRG numbers
XVIII H	196–205	18 001–010	10	1917–1918	2′C1′ h3	
XX HV	66–80, 206–213	19 001–023	23	1918–1923	1′D1′ h4v	

==== Mixed traffic locomotives ====
Class	Railway number(s)	DRG number(s)	Quantity	Year(s) of manufacture	Type	Remarks
II		98 7311–7312		1854–1875	1B n2	Various types, formerly classified as: H II (H III), K II (K III), B II (B III), Schi II (Schi III)
IIb				1858–1872	1′B n2	Formerly classified as: H IV, H IVb, IVb
VII		98 7111–7113		1868–1876	B n2	Formerly classified as: H VII, Schw VII (Schw I)

==== Goods train locomotives ====
Class (from 1896)	Railway number(s) (from 1892)	DRG number(s)	Quantity	Year(s) of manufacture	Type	Remarks
V a	797–800		4	1855–1863	C n2	Originally H Vb, from 1871: H Va; Taken over in 1868 with the Albert Railway
V	801–920, 937–971, 980–984, from 1900: 2801…2984	53 8201–8211	178	1859–1887	C n2	Originally classes H V, Schw V and Hsch V; 6 units sold in 1868 to the Berlin-Görlitz Railway; 12 units returned in 1877 to Hartmann for sale to the Russian Army; Nos. 880–884 taken over in 1882 with the Saxon-Thuringian East-West Railway; Nos. 861–865 taken over in 1888 with the Saxon section of the former Berlin-Dresden Railway
V	921–936, 972–979, 985–990, from 1900: 2921…2990		30	1868–1876	C n2	Originally classes K V, Sigl V and Hsch V; Taken over in 1876 with the LDE
V	991, from 1900: 2991		1	1886	C n2	Originally Class U V; same as Prussian G 3; taken over in 1888 with the Saxon section of the former Berlin-Dresden Railway
V V	1001–1064	53 601–729	164	1885–1901	C n2v	Originally Class H V C, from 1889: H V V and Sigl V V
V V	1000	53 751	1	1920	C n2v	Follow-on order using a spare boiler from a Turkish order
I V	1251–1280	55 6001–6013	30	1898–1903	B′B n4v	Articulated Mallet locomotive
IX V	751–770	56 501–516	20	1902–1906	1′D n2v	
IX V	1281–1282		2	1919	1′D n2v	kkStB 170, taken over from an order by the kkStB; Sold in 1922 to BBÖ
IX HV	771–800	56 601–625	30	1907–1908	1′D h2v	
XI H	701–708	57 101–105	8	1905	E h2	With Gölsdorf running gear (drive on fourth coupled axle)
XI HV	709–710	57 201–202	2	1905	E h2v	With Gölsdorf running gear (drive on fourth coupled axle)
XI HV	869–897	57 203–218	29	1915–1918	E h2v	
XI V	711–712	57 021–022	2	1905	E n2v	With Gölsdorf running gear (drive on fourth coupled axle)
XI V	713–750, 801–868	57 001–014, 57 023–080	106	1909–1915	E n2v	
XIII H	1165–1184	58 101–114	20	1917	1′E h3	Modified copy of the Prussian G 12^{1}
XIII H	1185–1226	58 401–442	42	1919–1921	1′E h3	Same as Prussian G 12
XIII H		58 443–462	20	1924	1′E h3	Copy, delivered with DRG numbers

==== Tank locomotives ====
Class	Railway number(s)	DRG number(s)	Quantity	Year(s) of manufacture	Type	Remarks
IIb T			10	1856–1862	1′B n2t	Originally classified as H IV, H IV T, H IVb T and IVb T
I T			6	1857–1865	1B n2t	Originally classified as H I and H I T
H VIIIb T			5	1857–1866	2′B n2t	Originally classified as H VIII and H VIII T
V T	1541–1691	89 201–295, 89 8201–8221, 89 8251–8267	154	1872–1920	C n2t	Originally classified as H T bzw. H V T, several designs
VII T	1401–1412, 1417–1459	98 7031, 98 7041, 98 7051–7079, 98 7091	57	1873–1894	B n2t	Originally classified as Crlsr VII T, Sch VII/Sch VII T,W VII T, E VII T and H VII T
IIIb T	1301–1342	98 7211–7212, 98 7221–7227	42	1874–1892	B1′ n2t	Originally classified as Schw IIIbT/H III T and H IIIb T
VII TS	1501–1515	98 7011	15	1880–1890	B n2t	Originally classified H VII T and H VII TS, reclassified as VII TSV after rebuild into compound locomotive
XVI T					B+B n4t	Rebuilt double locomotive from VII TS
VII TOV	1413–1416		4	1885–1887	B n2vt	Originally classified as H VII TO and H VII TOV (compound locomotives)
XVI TV					B+B n4vt	Rebuilt double locomotive from VII TOV
M I TV	1399, 1400		2	1890	B′B′ n4vt	Originally classified as H M I TV
I TV	1381–1398	98 001–015	19	1910–1914	B′B′ n4vt	
IV T	1701–1791	71 301–385	91	1897–1909	1′B1′ n2t	Originally classified as VIIIbbT
XI HT	2001–2154	94 1901–1908, 94 2001–2139, 94 2051, 2052	163	1908–1923	E h2t	
XIV HT	1801–1906	75 501–588	106	1911–1921	1′C1′ h2t	
XV HTV	1351, 1352	79 001–002	2	1916	CC h4vt	

==== Narrow gauge locomotives ====
===== Metre gauge =====
Class	Railway number(s)	DRG number(s)	Quantity	Year(s) of manufacture	Type	Remarks
I M	251–253	99 161–163	3	1902	B′B′ n4vt	

===== 750 mm gauge =====
Class	Railway number(s)	DRG number(s)	Quantity	Year(s) of manufacture	Type	Remarks
Hg VII TK	5		1	1873	B n2t	
I K	1–4, 6–17, 20–34, 37–42, 47–53	99 7501–7527	45	1881–1892	C n2t	Originally classified as H V TK
II K (old)	18–19		2	1885	B′B′ n4t	Originally classified as F T K
II K (new)	61AB, 62AB		2	1913	C+C n4t	Double locomotive from two IKs
III K	35–36, 43–46	99 7541–7546	6	1889–1891	C1′ n2t	Originally classified as Kr Kl T K and H Kl T K
IV K	103–198	99 511–608	96	1892–1921	B′B′ n4vt	Also classified as H M T K V
V K	201–209	99 611–619	9	1901–1907	D n2vt	
VI K	210–224	99 641–655	15	1918–1927	E h2t	

==== Fireless locomotive ====
Class	Railway number(s)	DRG number(s)	Quantity	Year(s) of manufacture	Type	Remarks
I F	1		1	1917	B	Fireless locomotive

=== Railbuses and electric locomotives ===
Class	Railway number(s)	DRG number(s)	Quantity	Year(s) of manufacture	Type	Remarks
Hz 0			3	1883	A2	Steam railcar, Thomas type
S 1			1	1903	A1	Steam railcar, Serpollet type
E 1			1	1904	Bo+Bo	Battery-electric railcar
I ME		E 191 01–02	2	1914	B′B′	Metre gauge electric locomotive
I MET		ET 197 21–22	2	1916	Bo	Metre gauge electric railcar
Dai 1			1	1904	A1	Diesel railcar
DET 1–2			2	1914	3′B′	Diesel railcar
9015			1		A1	Railbus

== See also ==
- History of rail transport in Germany
- Länderbahnen
- Kingdom of Saxony
- Royal Saxon State Railways
- UIC classification
