= Class 34 =

Class 34 or 34 class may refer to:

- Passenger train, tender locomotives with a 2-4-0 wheel arrangement operated by the Deutsche Reichsbahn:
  - Class 34.70: BBÖ 231 (locomotive with 0-6-0 wheel arrangement)
  - Class 34.73: Mecklenburg P 3.1
  - Class 34.76: Saxon III
  - Class 34.77–78: Saxon IIIb
  - Class 34.79: Saxon IIIb V
  - Class 34.80: Saxon VIb V
  - Class 34.81: Württemberg A
  - Class 34.82: Württemberg Ac
- New South Wales 34 class locomotive
