= Saxon I =

Saxon Class I Sächsische I
Type and origin
- Power type: Steam
- Build date: beginning in 1847
Specifications
- Configuration
  - Whyte: 2-4-0
  - UIC: 1B
Career
- Operators: Royal Saxon State Railways
- Class: I
- Retired: all by 1887
- Disposition: all scrapped

The Saxon Class I (German: Sächsische I) was a class of steam locomotive operated by the Royal Saxon State Railways with a 2-4-0 axle arrangement. The engines were supplied by various manufacturers for mixed duties.

== History ==
In 1871, the Royal Saxon State Railways grouped into Class I all those locomotives that had been procured from various manufacturers in the early years of state railway construction in the Kingdom of Saxony. These were all vehicles with a leading carrying axle and two coupled axles. The oldest locomotives of this class were procured in 1847 by the Saxon-Bavarian Railway. The last Class I locomotive was retired in 1887. No museum pieces have survived.

List of locomotives were that were placed in class I
| Name | Manufacturer | Serial number | Year | Original/previous owner | Notes |
|---|---|---|---|---|---|
| CAMEL | Borsig | 149 | 1847 | | |
| DROMEDAR | Borsig | 150 | 1847 | | |
| WURZEN | Borsig | 151 | 1847 | Leipzig–Dresden Railway Company | |
| OSCHATZ | Borsig | 152 | 1847 | Leipzig–Dresden Railway Company | |
| GREIF | | | | | |
| SCHAKALL | | | | | |
| STRAUSS | | | | | |
| GIRAFFE | | | | | |
| NASHORN | Borsig | 210 | 1848 | | |
| PANTHER | | | | | |
| GLÜCK AUF | Hartmann | 1 | 1848 | Saxon-Bavarian Railway | |
| SAXONIA | Hartmann | 2 | 1848 | Saxon-Bohemian State Railway | |
| GERMANIA | Hartmann | 3 | 1848 | Saxon-Bohemian State Railway | |
| PIRNA | Hartmann | 4 | 1848 | Saxon-Bohemian State Railway | |
| ROSS | Hartmann | 5 | 1848 | Saxon-Bavarian Railway | |
| ELBE | Hartmann | 6 | 1848 | Saxon-Bohemian State Railway | |
| HARTMANN (FAUST from 1869) | Hartmann | 8 | 1848 | Saxon-Bavarian Railway | |
| CROCODIL | Hartmann | 9 | 1848 | Saxon-Bavarian Railway | |
| KÖNIGSTEIN | Hartmann | 10 | 1849 | Saxon-Bohemian State Railway | |
| RHINOCEROS | Hartmann | 14 | 1850 | Saxon-Bavarian Railway | |
| HARTMANN | Hartmann | 15 | 1850 | Saxon-Bohemian State Railway | |
| PHÖNIX (PSYCHE from 1869) | Hartmann | 25 | 1850 | | Originally built by Rabenstein in 1846 as PEGASUS or TEUTONIA, rebuilt by Hartmann in 1850 |
| BOHEMIA | Hartmann | 26 | 1851 | Saxon-Bohemian State Railway | |
| AUSTRIA (JUNO from 1869) | Hartmann | 27 | 1851 | Saxon-Bohemian State Railway | |
| ZSCHOPAU | Hartmann | 28 | 1852 | Chemnitz-Riesaer Eisenbahn | |
| ERZGEBIRGE | Hartmann | 29 | 1852 | Chemnitz-Riesaer Eisenbahn | |
| DÖBELN | Hartmann | 30 | 1852 | Chemnitz-Riesaer Eisenbahn | |

== See also ==
- List of Saxon locomotives and railbuses
