= LDE – Borsdorf to Zittau =

LDE – BORSDORF to ZITTAU
Type and origin
- Builder: Maschinenfabrik Esslingen
- Build date: 1866–1868
- Total produced: 20
Specifications
- Driver dia.: 1,525 mm
- Carrying wheel diameter: 1,015 mm
- Wheelbase
  - Overall: 3,345 mm
- Axle load: 12.5 t
- Adhesive weight: 25.0 t
- Empty weight: 30.0 t
- Service weight: 34.0 t
- Boiler
- No. of heating tubes: 180
- Heating tube length: 4,260 mm
- Boiler pressure: 7.5 at
- Heating surface
  - Firebox: 1.21 m^{2}
  - Radiative: 7.2 m^{2}
  - Tubes: 98.8 m^{2}
  - Evaporative: 106.0 m^{2}
- Cylinders: 2
- Cylinder size: 406 mm
- Piston stroke: 610 mm
Career
- Numbers: 584–603 (1876); 676–695 (1892); 2677–2695 (1900)
- Retired: 1893–1913

The BORSDORF to ZITTAU series of early, German tender locomotives were used by the Leipzig–Dresden Railway Company (Leipzig-Dresdner Eisenbahn-Compagnie or LDE) for mixed duties.

== History ==
Between 1866 and 1868 the Leipzig-Dresden Railway had procured at total of 20 locomotives in 3 batches from the Maschinenfabrik Esslingen (Emil Keßler). They had a boiler with a rectangular dome, an inside Stephenson valve gear and Kirchweger condensers.

In LDE service the engines only sported names; no running numbers or classification was used. On being taken over by the Royal Saxon State Railways in 1876 they retained their names, as long as they were not duplicated elsewhere. In addition, they were given running numbers 584 to 603 and incorporated into Class K III. In 1885 the classification was changed to K II and in 1892 they were renumbered from 676 to 695. In 1896 the classification changed again simply to II and in 1900 the running numbers were increased by 2000 and the name boards removed. Because the older engines were no long fully operational, the numbering was no longer sequential.

By 1913 the locomotives had been retired.

== See also ==
- Royal Saxon State Railways
- List of Saxon locomotives and railbuses
- Leipzig–Dresden Railway Company
