= LDE Nos. 3 to 6 =

LDE - Nos. 3 to 6 VII T - 1407 to 1410
Type and origin
- Builder: Wöhlert, Berlin
- Build date: 1874
- Total produced: 4
Specifications
- Configuration
  - Whyte: 0-4-0
- Gauge: 1,435 mm (4 ft 8 1/2 in)
- Length
  - Over beams: 7,815 mm (25 ft 7 3/4 in)
- Height: 4,150 mm (13 ft 7 3/8 in)
- Axle load: 13.6 t
- Adhesive weight: 27.1 t
- Empty weight: 21.2 t
- Service weight: 27.1 t
- Fuel capacity: 0.9 t
- Water cap.: 3.5 t
- Boiler
- No. of heating tubes: 105
- Heating tube length: 3,487 mm (11 ft 5 1/4 in)
- Boiler pressure: 10 kgf/cm^{2} (981 kPa; 142 lbf/in^{2})
- Heating surface
  - Firebox: 1.0 m^{2} (11 sq ft)
  - Radiative: 5.8 m^{2} (62 sq ft)
  - Tubes: 62.0 m^{2} (667 sq ft)
  - Evaporative: 67.8 m^{2} (730 sq ft)
- Cylinders: 2
- Cylinder size: 355 mm (14 in)
- Piston stroke: 530 mm (20 7/8 in)
- Valve gear: Allan
Performance figures
- Maximum speed: 45
Career
- Numbers: Nos. 3 to 6 W VII T - 628 to 631; VII T - 1407 to 1410
- Retired: before 1916

Locomotive nos. 3 to 6 were early, German, four-coupled, tank engines designed for shunting duties with the Leipzig–Dresden Railway Company (Leipzig-Dresdner Eisenbahn or LDE).

== History ==
These four locomotives were delivered in 1874 by Wöhlert in Berlin to the LDE.

After the takeover of the LDE in 1876 by the Royal Saxon State Railways, the engines were incorporated into locomotive class W VII T. As well as being issued with the new numbers 628 to 631, they were given the names GRUBE, KUNST, BLENDE and CURVE. In 1892 they were renumbered 1407 to 1410.

The locomotives were retired before 1916.

== See also ==
- Royal Saxon State Railways
- List of Saxon locomotives and railbuses
- Leipzig–Dresden Railway Company

== Sources ==
- Näbrich, Fritz; Meyer, Günter; Preuß, Reiner (1983). Lokomotivarchiv Sachsen 2 (in German). Berlin: transpress VEB Verlag für Verkehrswesen.
- Preuß, Erich; Preuß, Rainer (1991). Sächsische Staatseisenbahnen (in German). Berlin: transpress Verlagsgesellschaft mbH. ISBN 3-344-70700-0.
