= LDE – Wurzen and Oschatz =

Class of 2 German 2-4-0 locomotives

LDE – WURZEN and OSCHATZ
Type and origin
- Builder: Borsig, Berlin
- Build date: 1847
- Total produced: 2
Specifications
- Configuration
  - Whyte: 2-4-0
- Gauge: 1,435 mm (4 ft 8 1/2 in)
- Driver dia.: 1,370 mm (4 ft 6 in)
- Carrying wheel diameter: NK
- Service weight: NK
- Boiler
- No. of heating tubes: 133
- Heating tube length: 3,200 mm (10 ft 6 in)
- Boiler pressure: 5.4 bar
- Heating surface
  - Firebox: 0.7 m^{2}
  - Evaporative: 74 m^{2}
- Cylinders: 2
- Cylinder size: 381 mm (15.0 in)
- Piston stroke: 610 mm (24 in)
Career
- Retired: by 1874

The locomotives WURZEN and OSCHATZ were early German steam engines operated by the Leipzig–Dresden Railway Company (LDE) for mixed duties. They were tender locomotives.

== History ==
The two locomotives were delivered in 1847 by Borsig in Berlin to the LDE.

The engines were retired between 1870 and 1874.

== Technical features ==
The boiler was of rivetted construction and comprised several sections. The outer firebox was topped with a semi-circular dome that extended forward over the boiler barrel and acted as a steam collection space. In addition there was a steam dome on the front section of the boiler. The two spring balance safety valves were located on the outer firebox.

The steam cylinders were located on the outside, unlike those on English locomotives, which avoided the need for a crank axle that would have been expensive and difficult to manufacture. The engine drove the second coupled axle. The steam engine was equipped with inside Borsig double valve gear driven via two eccentric cams.

The locomotives did not have their own braking equipment. Braking could only be achieved using the hand-operated screw brake on the tender.

In 1850 the locomotives were given Kirchweger condensers to pre-heat the feedwater. An external feature of that is the second chimney on the tender. Exhaust steam was led from the valve chest to the tender through a 100 mm connecting pipe.

== See also ==
- Royal Saxon State Railways
- List of Saxon locomotives and railbuses
- Leipzig–Dresden Railway Company

== Sources ==
- Näbrich, Fritz; Meyer, Günter; Preuß, Reiner (1983). Lokomotivarchiv Sachsen 1 (in German). Berlin: transpress VEB Verlag für Verkehrswesen.
- Näbrich, Fritz; Preuß, Reiner; Meyer, Günter (1984). Lokomotiven sächsischer Eisenbahnen, Schnellzug- und Personenzuglokomotiven (EFA 2.1) (in German). Düsseldorf: Alba. pp. 68–69, 194. ISBN 3-87094-096-4.
- Preuß, Erich; Preuß, Rainer (1991). Sächsische Staatseisenbahnen (in German). Berlin: transpress Verlagsgesellschaft mbH. ISBN 3-344-70700-0.
