= LDE – Dresden to Riesa =

LDE – DRESDEN to RIESA
Type and origin
- Builder: Hawthorn, Newcastle upon Tyne
- Build date: 1844, 1846
- Total produced: 3
Specifications
- Configuration
  - Whyte: 2-4-0
- Gauge: 1,435 mm (4 ft 8 1/2 in)
- Driver dia.: 1,524 mm
- Carrying wheel diameter: NK
- Axle load: 8.5 t
- Adhesive weight: 17 t
- Service weight: 25 t
- Boiler
- Heating tube length: 3,200 mm
- Boiler pressure: 5.0 at
- Heating surface
  - Firebox: 0.98 m^{2}
  - Evaporative: 65.0 m^{2}
- Cylinders: 2
- Cylinder size: 356 mm
- Piston stroke: 559 mm
Career
- Retired: by 1867

The DRESDEN to RIESA series of early German steam engines, were tender locomotives operated by the Leipzig–Dresden Railway Company (LDE).

== History ==
The three locomotives were delivered in 1844 and 1846 to the LDE by Hawthorn of Newcastle upon Tyne, England. They were christened DRESDEN, LEIPZIG and RIESA.

The locomotives were retired between 1861 and 1867.

== See also ==
- Royal Saxon State Railways
- List of Saxon locomotives and railbuses
- Saxonia (locomotive)
- Leipzig–Dresden Railway Company

== Sources ==
- Näbrich, Fritz; Meyer, Günter; Preuß, Reiner (1983). Lokomotivarchiv Sachsen 1 (in German). Berlin: transpress VEB Verlag für Verkehrswesen.
- Näbrich, Fritz; Preuß, Reiner; Meyer, Günter (1984). Lokomotiven sächsischer Eisenbahnen, Schnellzug- und Personenzuglokomotiven (EFA 2.1) (in German). Düsseldorf: Alba. pp. 68–60, 63, 122. ISBN 3-87094-096-4.
- Preuß, Erich; Preuß, Rainer (1991). Sächsische Staatseisenbahnen (in German). Berlin: transpress Verlagsgesellschaft mbH. ISBN 3-344-70700-0.
