= Saxon VIa =

Type and origin
- Builder: Borsig; Hartmann, Chemnitz
- Build date: 1848–1868
- Total produced: 43
Specifications
- Configuration
  - Whyte: 2-2-2
  - UIC: 1A1
- Leading dia.: 1,200 mm (3 ft 11 1/4 in)
- Driver dia.: 1,830 mm (6 ft 0 in)
- Trailing dia.: 1,200 mm (3 ft 11 1/4 in)
- Length
  - Over beams: N.K.
- Axle load: 11.8 t
- Adhesive weight: 11.8 t
- Service weight: 28.0 t
- Boiler pressure: 7.5 kg/cm^{2} (735 kPa; 107 psi)
- Heating surface
  - Firebox: 1.0 m^{2} (11 sq ft)
  - Evaporative: 87.1 m^{2} (938 sq ft)
- Cylinder size: 381 or 380 mm (15 or 14 15/16 in)
- Piston stroke: 508 or 560 mm (20 or 22 1/16 in)
- Loco brake: N.K.
Performance figures
- Maximum speed: N.K.
- Indicated power: N.K.
Career
- Retired: 1890–1902

The Saxon Class VIa were early Germany steam engines operated by the Royal Saxon State Railways (Königlich Sächsische Staatseisenbahn or K. Sächs. Sts. E. B.). The class included various types of fast-stopping train (Eilzug) locomotive, which had originally come from the Leipzig–Dresden Railway Company and the Eastern State Railway.

== History ==
Forty locomotives were built between 1848 and 1868 for the Leipzig-Dresden Railway (Leipzig-Dresdner Eisenbahn or LDE) for fast passenger services on the route between Leipzig and Dresden; three more were made for the Eastern State Railway (Östliche Staatsbahn) in 1861/62 for employment on the Dresden–Bodenbach railway. The Royal Saxon State Railways grouped all uncoupled locomotives into its Class _ VIa, whereby the prefix _ represented the short form of the manufacturer's name until 1896 (after which it was dropped entirely). Class VI was for the so-called Eilzuglokomotiven ("fast-stopping train locomotives") and a stood for older (ältere) designs; in this case for the uncoupled engines with a 2-2-2 wheel arrangement.

When the K. Sächs. Sts. E. B. was founded in 1869 it initially only had the three Hartmann locomotives from the Östlichen Staatsbahn in its fleet. From 1871 they were classified as Class H VI a.

The Leipzig-Dresden Railway had retired the first eight of its locomotives (the Borsig and Hartmann deliveries of 1848/49) by 1868 and converted the next four Borsig engines from 1854 to 0-4-2 tender or tank locomotives in 1873/76. These early machines had significantly different dimensions from the later ones. Following the nationalisation of the LDE in 1876, the 28 remaining engines which had been built by Hartmann in 1856 and Borsig in 1868 were given the class designations H VIa and B VIa respectively, the conversions being classed as B II and B IIa T.

The so-called Spinnräder ("spinning wheels") lasted a surprisingly long time. In 1890 21 engines were still in service, almost half the original fleet. In its last years they were used mainly on local passenger train duties. The last one was retired in 1902, number 6, formerly GUSTAV HARKORT.

Railway number 2, formerly BOEHLEN (previously ZÜRICH in the LDE) was the penultimate engine to be withdrawn, in 1900. In 1901 it was taken back by the state railway and was intended to be given to the Saxon Railway Museum. However it was scrapped around 1925.

== Technical features ==
The engines had an inside plate frame and, apart from the three engines with the Eastern State Railway, a Kirchweger condenser. The valve gear was either a Borsig or Stephenson type. In addition the locos had various types of boiler. Most of the locomotives were still being delivered without driver's cabs.

== See also ==
- Royal Saxon State Railways
- List of Saxon locomotives and railbuses
- Leipzig–Dresden Railway Company
