= Saxon X V =

Saxon X V DRG Class 14.2
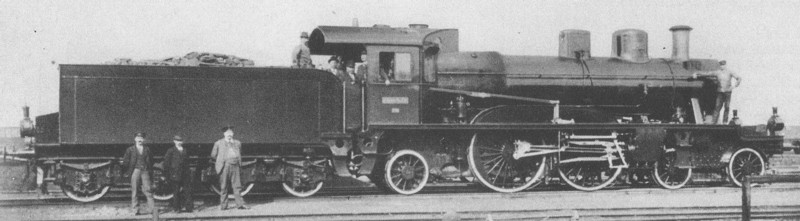
Type and origin
- Builder: Sächsische Maschinenfabrik, Chemnitz
- Build date: 1900 (prototypes); 1902/03 (production)
- Total produced: 15
Specifications
- Configuration
  - Whyte: 4-4-2
  - UIC: 2′B1′ n4v
- Gauge: 1,435 mm (4 ft 8 1/2 in)
- Leading dia.: 1,065 mm (3 ft 5 7/8 in)
- Driver dia.: 1,980 mm (6 ft 6 in)
- Trailing dia.: 1,240 mm (4 ft 7/8 in)
- Length
  - Over beams: 20,353 mm (66 ft 9 1/4 in)
- Axle load: 16.0 t / 15.7 t
- Adhesive weight: 32.0 t / 31.4 t
- Empty weight: 61.9 t / 62.0 t
- Service weight: 69.3 t / 69.4 t
- Boiler
- No. of heating tubes: 222
- Heating tube length: 4,700 mm (15 ft 5 in)
- Boiler pressure: 15 kg/cm^{2} (1.47 MPa; 213 psi)
- Heating surface
  - Firebox: 2.41 m^{2} (25.9 sq ft) / 2.38 m^{2} (25.6 sq ft)
  - Radiative: 13.7 m^{2} (147 sq ft) / 13.3 m^{2} (143 sq ft)
  - Tubes: 151.5 m^{2} (1,631 sq ft) / 147.5 m^{2} (1,588 sq ft)
  - Evaporative: 165.2 m^{2} (1,778 sq ft) / 160.8 m^{2} (1,731 sq ft)
- High-pressure cylinder: 350 mm (13 3/4 in)
- Low-pressure cylinder: 555 mm (21 7/8 in)
- Piston stroke: 660 mm (26 in)
- Valve gear: Walschaerts (Heusinger)/Joy
- Loco brake: Westinghouse compressed-air brake
Performance figures
- Maximum speed: 120 km/h (75 mph) / 100 km/h (62 mph)
- Indicated power: 1,060 PS (780 kW; 1,050 hp)
Career
- Numbers: K.Sä.St.E.: 175–176, 183–195; DRG: 14 201–215
- Retired: 1926

The Royal Saxon State Railways designated four-coupled, Atlantic (4-4-2) express locomotives as Class X $\textstyle \mathfrak{V}$ and the Deutsche Reichsbahn subsequently grouped these locomotives into DRG Class 14.2 in 1925.

== History ==
In 1900 the Sächsische Maschinenfabrik engineering works built the first two express locomotives of the new four-coupled, Atlantics with a four-cylinder compound engine. One of the locomotives was displayed at the Paris World Exhibition in 1900 and was awarded the Grand Prix.

The Royal Saxon State Railways took over the two prize-winning locomotives and procured another 13 up to 1903 that differed from the prototypes, particularly in terms of the diameter of the carrying axles. They were the largest and most powerful locomotives in Saxony to that point. The X V was employed on express train duties on the plains where its riding qualities and economy were impressive.

In 1920 the Deutsche Reichsbahn took over all 15 engines and gave them the new numbers 14 201–215 in 1925. They were retired by 1926.

== Technical features ==
The locomotives had a boiler with a Belpaire firebox, which was located between the frame sides. Two injectors provided the boiler feedwater.

The steam engine was designed as a de Glehn four-cylinder compound. The outer high-pressure cylinders drove the second coupled axle, whilst the inside low-pressure cylinders drove the first. The motion for the engine was a Walschaerts valve gear on the outer cylinders and a Joy valve gear on the inner ones.

Braking for locomotive and train was provided by a Westinghouse compressed-air brake. On the two prototypes the air pump was on the right, on the remaining locomotives it was installed on the left hand side.

The coupled axles were fixed to the frame. The leading bogie was an Erfurt design, the trailing axle was an Adams axle.

The locomotives were coupled with Saxon tenders of classes sä 2'2' T 18, sä 2'2' T 19.5 and sä 2'2' T 21.

== Service ==
The locomotives were only in express train service on the Leipzig–Dresden railway for a few years before the four-coupled engines proved too underpowered for the steadily climbing train loads. The X V was then deployed mainly on the passenger trains from Dresden to Bodenbach, Leipzig and Zittau until its retirement.

== See also ==
- Royal Saxon State Railways
- List of Saxon locomotives and railbuses

== Sources ==
- Hütter, Ingo (2009). Die Dampflokomotiven der Baureihen 01 bis 45 der DRG, DRB, DB, und DR (in German). Werl: DGEG Medien. p. 144. ISBN 978-3-937189-45-1.
- Näbrich, Fritz; Meyer, Günter; Preuß, Reiner (1983). Lokomotivarchiv Sachsen 1 (in German). Berlin: transpress VEB Verlag für Verkehrswesen.
- Näbrich, Fritz; Preuß, Reiner; Meyer, Günter (1984). Lokomotiven sächsischer Eisenbahnen, Schnellzug- und Personenzuglokomotiven (EFA 2.1) (in German). Düsseldorf: Alba. pp. 159–162, 212. ISBN 3-87094-096-4.
- Preuß, Erich; Preuß, Rainer (1991). Sächsische Staatseisenbahnen (in German). Berlin: transpress Verlagsgesellschaft mbH. ISBN 3-344-70700-0.
- Reiche, Günther (1998). Richard Hartmann und seine Lokomotiven (in German). Berlin/Chemnitz: Oberbaumverlag. ISBN 3-928254-56-1.
- Weisbrod, Manfred; Müller, Hans; Petznik, Wolfgang (1976). Dampflokomotiven deutscher Eisenbahnen, Baureihe 01–39 (EFA 1.1) (in German) (3rd ed.). Düsseldorf: Alba Buchverlag. pp. 99–101. ISBN 3-87094-081-6.
