= LDE – Peter Rothwell to Nordlicht =

LDE - PETER ROTHWELL to NORDLICHT
Type and origin
- Builder: Rothwell
- Build date: 1838–1840
- Total produced: 6
Specifications
- Configuration
  - Whyte: 2-2-2
- Gauge: 1,435 mm (4 ft 8 1/2 in)
- Driver dia.: 1,525 mm (5 ft 0 in)
- Carrying wheel diameter: NK
- Boiler
- Heating tube length: 2,286 mm (7 ft 6 in)
- Boiler pressure: 4 kg/cm^{2} (390 kPa; 57 psi)
- Heating surface
  - Evaporative: NK
- Cylinders: 2
- Cylinder size: 279 mm (11 in)
- Piston stroke: 457 mm (18 in)
Career
- Retired: to 1864

The Peter Rothwell to Nordlicht series of steam engines were early passenger tender locomotives operated by the Leipzig–Dresden Railway Company (Leipzig-Dresdner Eisenbahn or LDE) in Germany.

== History ==
The six locomotives were delivered from 1838 to 1840 by Rothwell, England to the LDE. They were given the names PETER ROTHWELL, SALAMANDER, MAGDEBURG, SIMSON, ALTENBURG and NORDLICHT.

The engines were retired between 1856 and 1864.

== See also ==
- Royal Saxon State Railways
- List of Saxon locomotives and railbuses
- Leipzig–Dresden Railway Company

== Sources ==
- Näbrich, Fritz; Meyer, Günter; Preuß, Reiner (1983). Lokomotivarchiv Sachsen 1 (in German). Berlin: transpress VEB Verlag für Verkehrswesen.
- Näbrich, Fritz; Preuß, Reiner; Meyer, Günter (1984). Lokomotiven sächsischer Eisenbahnen, Schnellzug- und Personenzuglokomotiven (EFA 2.1) (in German). Düsseldorf: Alba. pp. 61, 191. ISBN 3-87094-096-4.
- Preuß, Erich; Preuß, Rainer (1991). Sächsische Staatseisenbahnen (in German). Berlin: transpress Verlagsgesellschaft mbH. ISBN 3-344-70700-0.
