= LDE – Moldau to Mulde =

LDE – MOLDAU to MULDE
Type and origin
- Builder: Maschinenfabrik Esslingen
- Build date: 1874 / 1875
Specifications
- Driver dia.: 1,525 mm
- Carrying wheel diameter: 1,015 mm
- Axle load: 11.7 t
- Adhesive weight: 23.4 t
- Empty weight: 28.2 t
- Service weight: 32.5 t
- Boiler
- No. of heating tubes: 176
- Heating tube length: 4,260 mm
- Boiler pressure: 9.0 at
- Heating surface
  - Firebox: 1.10 m^{2}
  - Radiative: 7.2 m^{2}
  - Tubes: 94.2 m^{2}
  - Evaporative: 101.4 m^{2}
- Cylinders: 2
- Cylinder size: 406 mm
- Piston stroke: 610 mm
- Valve gear: Stephenson
Career
- Numbers: 604–612 (1876); 696–704 (1892); 2696–2704 (1900)
- Retired: 1904–1923

The MOLDAU to MULDE series of early, German steam engines were designed as tender locomotives for the Leipzig–Dresden Railway Company (Leipzig-Dresdner Eisenbahn-Compagnie or LDE) for mixed duties.

== History ==
As early as 1866 and 1868 the Leipzig-Dresden Railway had procured 2-4-0 steam engines from Maschinenfabrik Esslingen. The nine locomotives acquired in 1874/75 differed from the older batch mainly in their modern Crampton boilers and inside Allan valve gear.

In the LDE the locomotives were only given names; no running numbers or classification. On being taken over in 1876 by the Royal Saxon State Railways most of them were given new names in order to avoid duplication. In addition they were allocated the running numbers 604 to 612 and grouped into Class K III.

In 1885 their classification was changed to K II and in 1892 they were renumbered from 696 to 704. From 1896 the classification just became II. From 1900 their running numbers were raised by 2000 and the name plates were removed.

In 1904 the first locomotives were retired. Several ended up in 1920 in the fleet of the newly founded Deutsche Reichsbahn. In the preliminary renumbering plan two locomotives were allocated new running numbers: 98 7301 and 7302, the rest were not covered.

In 1923 the last locomotive in this class, the former MOLDAU, was withdrawn from the fleet.

== Locomotive table ==
Locomotive table
Name	Works No.	Built	No. (1876)	Name (1876)	No. (1892)	No. (1900)	Retired
MOLDAU	1336	1874	604	MOLDAU	696	2692	1923
EGER	1337	1874	605	RUHLAND	697	2697	1911
KOHLFURT	1338	1874	606	KOHLFURT	698	2698	1904
PILSEN	1339	1874	607	TRIEBISCH	699	2699	1921
FRAUENSTEIN	1340	1874	608	ESSLINGEN	700	2700	1911
WIEN	1360	1875	609	LOHMEN	701	2701	1922
CÖLN	1361	1875	610	GMUNDEN	702	2701	1909
BERLIN	1362	1875	611	GRATZ	703	2703	1909
MULDE	1363	1875	612	MILTITZ	704	2704	1921

== See also ==
- Royal Saxon State Railways
- List of Saxon locomotives and railbuses
- Leipzig–Dresden Railway Company
