= LDE – Robert Stephenson =

LDE - ROBERT STEPHENSON
Type and origin
- Builder: Robert Stephenson & Co., Newcastle upon Tyne
- Build date: 1838 – 1840
- Total produced: 1
Specifications
- Configuration
  - Whyte: 2-2-2
- Gauge: 1,435 mm (4 ft 8 1/2 in)
- Driver dia.: 1,676 mm (5 ft 6.0 in)
- Carrying wheel diameter: NK
- Boiler
- Heating tube length: 2,438 mm (8 ft 0 in)
- Boiler pressure: 4 atm (59 psi)
- Heating surface
  - Evaporative: NK
- Cylinders: 2
- Cylinder size: 305 mm (12.0 in)
- Piston stroke: 457 mm (18.0 in)
Career
- Retired: by 1860

The Robert Stephenson was an early passenger steam locomotive operated by the Leipzig–Dresden Railway Company or LDE.

The locomotive was delivered to the LDE in 1838 by Robert Stephenson & Co., Newcastle upon Tyne, England, with factory number 205. It was retired sometime between 1857 and 1860.

== See also ==
- Royal Saxon State Railways
- List of Saxon locomotives and railbuses
- Leipzig–Dresden Railway Company

== Sources ==
- Näbrich, Fritz; Meyer, Günter; Preuß, Reiner (1983). Lokomotivarchiv Sachsen 1 (in German). Berlin: transpress VEB Verlag für Verkehrswesen.
- Näbrich, Fritz; Preuß, Reiner; Meyer, Günter (1984). Lokomotiven sächsischer Eisenbahnen, Schnellzug- und Personenzuglokomotiven (EFA 2.1) (in German). Düsseldorf: Alba. pp. 61, 191. ISBN 3-87094-096-4.
- Preuß, Erich; Preuß, Rainer (1991). Sächsische Staatseisenbahnen (in German). Berlin: transpress Verlagsgesellschaft mbH. ISBN 3-344-70700-0.
