= Saxon VI =

Class of steam locomotives

LDE – Saxon VI
Type and origin
- Builder: Hartmann; Borsig; (BMAG); (Henschel)
- Build date: 1860–1870 (–1876)
- Total produced: 41 (+18)
Specifications
- Configuration
  - Whyte: 2-4-0
  - UIC: 1B (1′B)
- Leading dia.: 990 mm (3 ft 3 in)
- Driver dia.: 1,830 mm (6 ft 0 in)
- Length
  - Over beams: N.K.
- Axle load: 10.8 or 12.1 tonnes (10.6 or 11.9 long tons; 11.9 or 13.3 short tons)
- Adhesive weight: 21.5 or 24.8 tonnes (21.2 or 24.4 long tons; 23.7 or 27.3 short tons)
- Service weight: 32.5 or 35.0 tonnes (32.0 or 34.4 long tons; 35.8 or 38.6 short tons)
- Boiler pressure: 7.0 kg/cm^{2} (686 kPa; 99.6 psi)
- Heating surface
  - Firebox: 1.3 or 1.4 m^{2} (14 or 15 sq ft) /
  - Evaporative: 83.5 or 83.9 m^{2} (899 or 903 sq ft) /
- Cylinder size: 560 mm (22 1/16 in)
- Piston stroke: 406 mm (16 in)
- Loco brake: from 1888 Schleifer, Carpenter or Westinghouse brakes
Performance figures
- Maximum speed: 85 km/h (53 mph)
- Indicated power: N.K.
Career
- Retired: 1890–1905 (–1925)

The Saxon VI were a class of early German, express train, steam locomotives operated by the Royal Saxon State Railways (Königlich Sächsische Staatseisenbahnen or K. Sächs. Sts. E. B.).

Between 1860 and 1867 Hartmann had supplied 24 locomotives to the Western State Railway and in 1865 Borsig delivered a further nine; all of which were transferred to the Royal Saxon State Railways in 1869. In 1870 another eight locomotives by Hartmann went straight to the state railway. As 2-4-0 "fast-stopping train" (Eilzug) locomotives they were classified as B VI and H VI according to their manufacturer. In 1874 Schwartzkopff had delivered 14 2-4-0 express engines to the Berlin-Dresden Railway. After the company had been nationalised in 1887 by Prussia, the line and its running and rolling stock were divided in 1888 between Prussia and Saxony. Six of these express locomotives were given to the K. Sächs. Sts. E. B. as Class Schw VI, the other eight went into the Prussian state railways. The Leipzig–Dresden Railway Company had also procured 6 express train locomotives in 1875 and another 6 in 1876 from Henschel, which after nationalisation in 1876 were classified as Hsch VI or even Hl VI.

The first examples still had a boiler with a rectangular dome by Stephenson and a forked frame. Later models (Schwartzkopff, Henschel) were built with a Crampton boiler and full plate frame. Because some of their technical details differed markedly from those of the Borsig and Hartmann batches (smaller driving wheels, higher boiler pressure) they are given at several places in the table in brackets. All examples had horizontal, outside cylinders. Two engines from the 1870 Hartmann batch were given a Nowotny carrying axle in 1885, changing the axle arrangement from 1B to 1'B and the classification to H VIb. The older Class VI models (in 1896 manufacturer's code letter(s) were dropped from the classification) were taken out of service about the start of the 20th century (by 1905); those from Schwartzkopff- and Henschel followed from 1910 onwards. Even though these machines had already become rarities in the 1920s, three examples were still included in the preliminary Deutsche Reichsbahn renumbering plan as 34 8001–8003; but the class was no longer represented by the time the final numbering scheme came out in 1925.

== See also ==
- Royal Saxon State Railways
- List of Saxon locomotives and railbuses
- Leipzig–Dresden Railway Company

== Sources ==
- Näbrich, Fritz; Preuß, Reiner; Meyer, Günter (1984). Lokomotiven sächsischer Eisenbahnen, Schnellzug- und Personenzuglokomotiven (EFA 2.1) (in German). Düsseldorf: Alba. pp. 107–114, 204–205. ISBN 3-87094-096-4.
- Spielhoff, Lothar (1990). Länderbahn-Dampf-Lokomotiven. Band 1: Preußen, Mecklenburg, Oldenburg, Sachsen und Elsaß-Lothringen (in German). Stuttgart: Franckh'sche Verlagshandlung. ISBN 3-440-06145-0.
