= Saxon IIIb V =

IIIb V DR Class 34.79
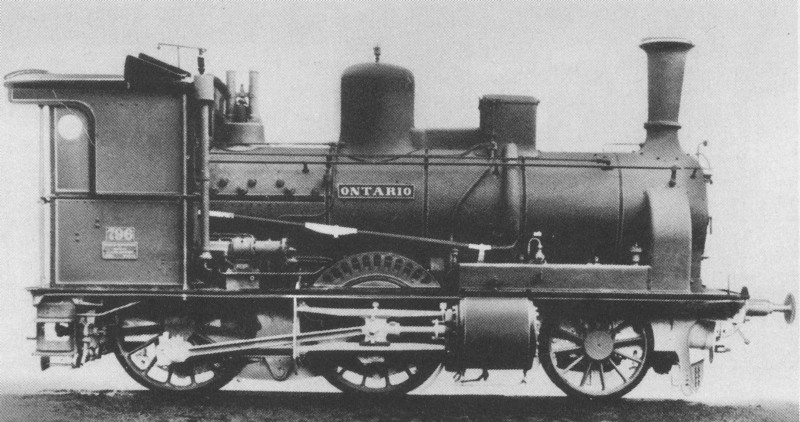
Type and origin
- Builder: Sächsische Maschinenfabrik, Chemnitz
- Build date: 1889/1892
- Total produced: 18
Specifications
- Configuration
  - UIC: 1′B n2v
- Gauge: 1,435 mm (4 ft 8 1/2 in)
- Driver dia.: 1,560 mm (5 ft 1 3/8 in)
- Carrying wheel diameter: 1,230 mm (4 ft 3/8 in)
- Wheelbase
  - Overall: 4,550 mm (14 ft 11 1/4 in) / 4,950 mm (16 ft 3 in)
- Length
  - Over beams: 13,996 mm (45 ft 11 in)
- Height: 4,150 mm (13 ft 7 3/8 in)
- Axle load: 13.9 t
- Adhesive weight: 27.8 t
- Empty weight: 37.2 t
- Service weight: 41.0 t
- Boiler
- No. of heating tubes: 180
- Heating tube length: 3,500 mm (11 ft 5 3/4 in)
- Boiler pressure: 12 kg/cm^{2} (1,180 kPa; 171 psi)
- Heating surface
  - Firebox: 1.82 m^{2} (19.6 sq ft)
  - Radiative: 8.0 m^{2} (86 sq ft)
  - Tubes: 89.0 m^{2} (958 sq ft)
  - Evaporative: 97.02 m^{2} (1,044.3 sq ft)
- Cylinders: 2
- High-pressure cylinder: 650 mm (25 9/16 in)
- Low-pressure cylinder: 420 mm (16 9/16 in)
- Piston stroke: 560 mm (22 1/16 in)
- Valve gear: Allan
- Loco brake: Schleifer air brakes Westinghouse air brakes (refit)
Performance figures
- Maximum speed: 75 km/h (47 mph)
Career
- Numbers: KSäStE: 501–518; DR: 34 7901 – 34 7902
- Retired: 1923

The Saxon Class IIIb $\textstyle \mathfrak{V}$ was a twin-coupled tender locomotive built for passenger services with the Royal Saxon State Railways.

== History ==
Following the success with the compound locomotives of Class VIb V, corresponding locomotives were procured for hauling passenger trains. Based on the design of the Saxon IIIb the Saxon Engineering Works (Sächsische Maschinenfabrik) built a compound engine. In the years 1889 and 1892 a total of 18 units of the IIIb V were built for passenger train duties. Because the engines apparently did not prove themselves, no further orders were placed.

In 1920, the Deutsche Reichsbahn took over some of the locomotives, but only two remaining engines were included in the new numbering scheme in 1924: numbers 34 7901 and 34 7902.

== Design features ==
The locomotives had a boiler made from three shell rings with a semi-circular cover which, in the area of the firebox, was tucked in it between the frame plates. The boiler was fed by two non-sucking injectors.

The steam engine was designed as a twin-cylinder compound engine with interior Allan valve gear. The high-pressure cylinder was placed on the right, the larger, low-pressure cylinder on the left. They drove the second coupled axle.

The driving axles were fixed in the frame, the leading carrying wheels were designed as a Novotny-Klien axle.

The locomotives left the factory equipped with Schleifer compressed air brakes; these only braked the engine, however. Later, all the locomotives were fitted with Westinghouse air brakes. The locomotiven were coupled to tenders of Saxon Class sä 3 T 9.
