= LDE – Comet =

Comet, Faust / Blitz, Windsbraut
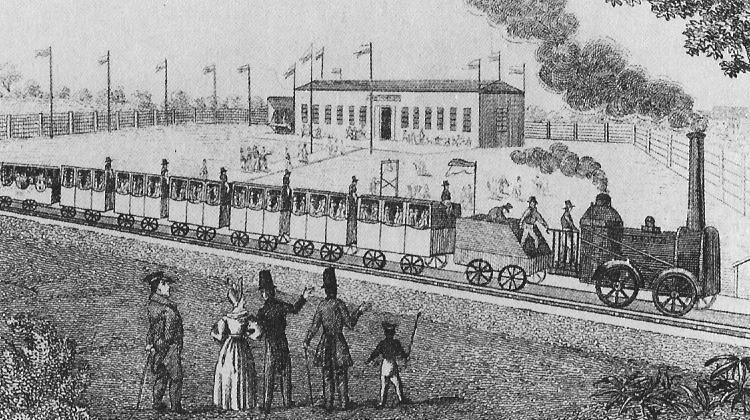
- The locomotive Blitz at Althen ready to depart
Type and origin
- Builder: Rothwell
- Build date: 1835–1838
- Total produced: 4
Specifications
- Configuration
  - Whyte: 0-4-0 (0-4-2 after rebuild)
- Driver dia.: 1,372 / 1,524 mm (4 ft 6.0 in / 5 ft 0 in)
- Adhesive weight: ? / 8.0 t
- Service weight: ? / 8.0 t (7.9 long tons; 8.8 short tons)
- Boiler pressure: 4 bar (400 kPa; 58 psi)
- Heating surface
  - Firebox: ? / 0.79 m^{2} (8.5 sq ft)
  - Evaporative: ? / 28.5 m^{2} (307 sq ft)
- Cylinder size: 279 mm (11.0 in)
- Piston stroke: 406 mm (16.0 in)
- Loco brake: none (hand brake on the tender)
Career
- Retired: 1849

The German locomotives Comet, Faust, Blitz and Windsbraut were four of the first locomotives on the Leipzig–Dresden Railway Company (LDE). They were four-coupled engines, that Rothwell and Company had built in Manchester between 1835 and 1838.

Comet was the first locomotive to be delivered to Saxony. It arrived at Leipzig in November 1836, packed in 15 crates. After reassembly testing began on 28 March 1837 and was then deployed in constructing the railway. Comet was followed by Blitz, Windsbraut and Faust, the last being similar in dimensions to Comet. The other two were somewhat larger (their technical data, where different, are given in the table after a "/")

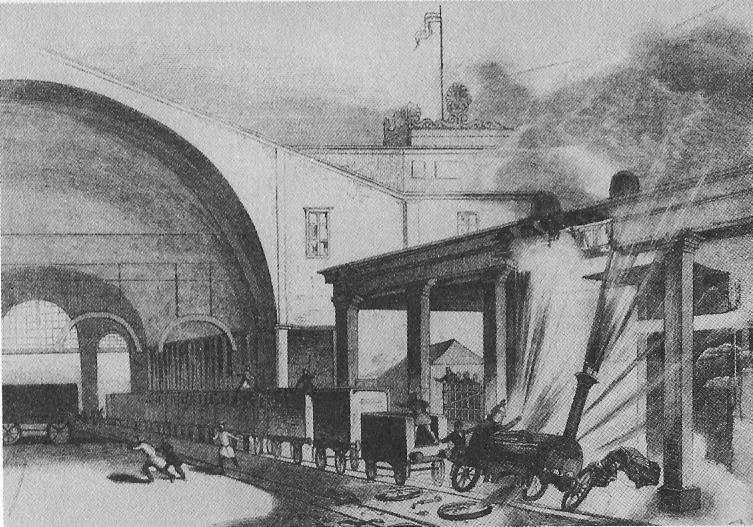
Explosion of Windsbraut on 21 May 1846 in Leipzig

All the engines had a cylindrical firebox and boiler barrel, an oak locomotive frame reinforced with sheet wrought iron and inside cylinders and valve gear. In 1842, following a serious accident in France the operation of twin-axled locomotives was banned and the engines were rebuilt as 0-4-2s through the addition of a trailing axle. Such early machines had to be repaired at frequent intervals and these engines were no exception. Windsbraut exploded on 21 May 1846 with a train about to depart from the Dresdner station in Leipzig. The other locomotives were retired no later than 1849.

== See also ==
- Royal Saxon State Railways
- List of Saxon locomotives and railbuses
- Leipzig–Dresden Railway Company
