= LDE – Edward Bury to Pfeil =

Tender engines operated by the Leipzig-Dresden Railway Company

LDE - EDWARD BURY to PFEIL
Type and origin
- Builder: Bury, Liverpool
- Build date: 1837
- Total produced: 4
Specifications
- Configuration
  - Whyte: 0-4-0
- Gauge: 1,435 mm (4 ft 8 1/2 in)
- Driver dia.: 1,524 mm
- Boiler
- Heating tube length: 2438 mm
- Boiler pressure: 4.0 at
- Heating surface
  - Evaporative: NK
- Cylinders: 2
- Cylinder size: 279 mm
- Piston stroke: 457 mm
Career
- Retired: by 1854

The EDWARD BURY to PFEIL series of early German locomotives were tender engines operated by the Leipzig–Dresden Railway Company (Leipzig-Dresdner Eisenbahn or LDE).

== History ==
The four locomotives were delivered to the LDE in 1838 by Edward Bury and Company of Liverpool, England. They were given the names EDWARD BURY, DRACHE, ADLER and PFEIL.

The locomotives were retired between 1847 and 1854.

== Technical features ==
The boiler was rivetted from several sections. The outer firebox was furnished with a dome that projected a long way forward over the boiler barrel and acted as the steam collection space. The two spring balance safety valves were located on the outer firebox. Two piston pumps provided boiler feedwater; they were driven via an eccentric cam from one of the axles.

The steam cylinder was based on English construction principles and located inside under the level of the axles which meant it required an expensive and heavy cranked axle. The engine drove the second coupled axle. The steam engine was probably fitted with a simple Stephenson valve gear without a steam expansion stage, which would not have permitted any control of steam admission.

The locomotives did not have their own braking equipment. Braking could only be achieved using a hand-operated screw brake on the tender.

== See also ==
- Royal Saxon State Railways
- List of Saxon locomotives and railbuses
- Leipzig–Dresden Railway Company

== Sources ==
- Näbrich, Fritz; Meyer, Günter; Preuß, Reiner (1983). Lokomotivarchiv Sachsen 1 (in German). Berlin: transpress VEB Verlag für Verkehrswesen.
- Näbrich, Fritz; Preuß, Reiner; Meyer, Günter (1984). Lokomotiven sächsischer Eisenbahnen, Schnellzug- und Personenzuglokomotiven (EFA 2.1) (in German). Düsseldorf: Alba. pp. 61, 191. ISBN 3-87094-096-4.
- Preuß, Erich; Preuß, Rainer (1991). Sächsische Staatseisenbahnen (in German). Berlin: transpress Verlagsgesellschaft mbH. ISBN 3-344-70700-0.
