= LDE – Brüssel =

LDE - BRÜSSEL
Type and origin
- Builder: Renard, Brussels
- Build date: 1842
- Total produced: 1
Specifications
- Configuration
  - Whyte: 2-2-2
- Gauge: 1,435 mm (4 ft 8 1/2 in)
- Cylinders: 2
Career
- Retired: by 1861
- (no technical data known)

The BRÜSSEL was an early German steam locomotive. It was used by the Leipzig–Dresden Railway Company (LDE) for hauling passenger trains.

The locomotive was delivered to the LDE in 1842 by Renard of Brussels in Belgium with works number 11. It was retired between 1859 and 1861.

== See also ==
- Royal Saxon State Railways
- List of Saxon locomotives and railbuses
- Leipzig–Dresden Railway Company
