= Saxon VIII 1 =

Type and origin
- Builder: n.k.
- Total produced: 8
Specifications
- Configuration
  - Whyte: 4-4-0
  - UIC: 2′B
- Leading dia.: 990 mm (3 ft 3 in)
- Driver dia.: 1,830 mm (6 ft 0 in)
- Length
  - Over beams: n.k.
- Axle load: 10.2 tonnes (10.0 long tons; 11.2 short tons)
- Adhesive weight: 20.3 tonnes (20.0 long tons; 22.4 short tons)
- Service weight: 36.8 tonnes (36.2 long tons; 40.6 short tons)
- Boiler pressure: 8.5 kg/cm^{2} (830 kPa; 121 psi)
- Heating surface
  - Firebox: 1.32 m^{2} (14.2 sq ft)
  - Evaporative: 93.2 m^{2} (1,003 sq ft)
- Cylinder size: 406 mm (16 in)
- Piston stroke: 560 mm (22 1/16 in)
- Loco brake: Westinghouse brake Schleiferbremsen
Performance figures
- Maximum speed: 70 km/h (43 mph)
- Indicated power: n.k.
Career
- First run: 1870
- Retired: by 1922

The Saxon Class VIII 1 were early German 4-4-0 steam locomotives built for the Royal Saxon State Railways (Königlich Sächsische Staats-Eisenbahn) for express train services. The engines were deployed on the railway route between Dresden and Chemnitz.

They were based on a prototype from Württemberg. They were fitted with an American bogie and had a high outer firebox instead of the second steam dome. As a result, the boiler was also pitched higher.

These locomotives were over 50 years old when they were retired around 1922 by the Deutsche Reichsbahn before being given a new classification.

== See also ==
- Royal Saxon State Railways
- List of Saxon locomotives and railbuses

== Literature ==
- Näbrich, Fritz; Preuß, Reiner; Meyer, Günter (1984). Lokomotiven sächsischer Eisenbahnen, Schnellzug- und Personenzuglokomotiven (EFA 2.1) (in German). Düsseldorf: Alba. pp. 121–122, 207. ISBN 3-87094-096-4.
- Spielhoff, Lothar (1990). Länderbahn-Dampf-Lokomotiven. Band 1: Preußen, Mecklenburg, Oldenburg, Sachsen und Elsaß-Lothringen (in German). Stuttgart: Franckh'sche Verlagshandlung. ISBN 3-440-06145-0.
