= Saxon VII T =

VII T DR 98 7051 to 98 7079
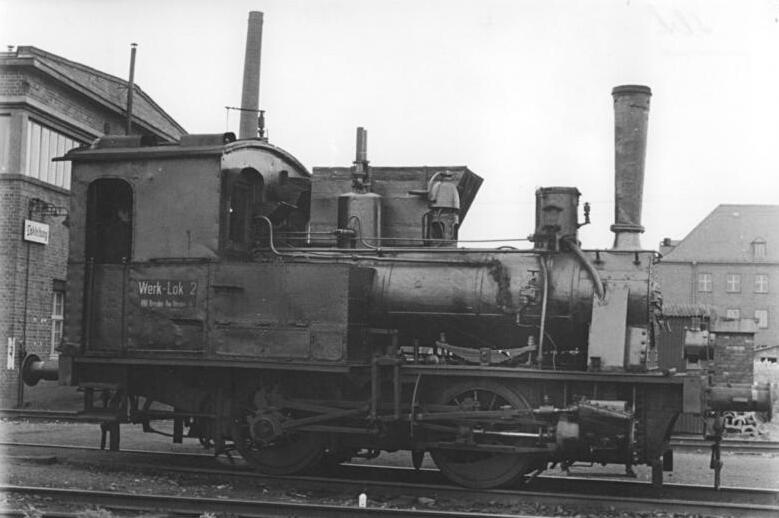
Type and origin
- Builder: Sächsische Maschinenfabrik, Chemnitz
- Build date: 1882–1894
- Total produced: 42
Specifications
- Gauge: 1,435 mm (4 ft 8 1/2 in)
- Driver dia.: 1,100 mm (3 ft 7 1/4 in)
- Axle load: 12.3–10.4 t (12.1–10.2 long tons; 13.6–11.5 short tons)
- Adhesive weight: 24.6–26.7 t (24.2–26.3 long tons; 27.1–29.4 short tons)
- Empty weight: 19.0–20.7 t (18.7–20.4 long tons; 20.9–22.8 short tons)
- Service weight: 24.6–26.7 t (24.2–26.3 long tons; 27.1–29.4 short tons)
- Fuel capacity: 0.9 t
- Water cap.: 2.9 m^{3} (640 imp gal)
- Boiler
- No. of heating tubes: 98
- Heating tube length: 3,170 mm (10 ft 4 3/4 in)
- Boiler pressure: 12 kg/cm^{2} (1,180 kPa; 171 psi)
- Heating surface
  - Firebox: 0.9 m^{2} (9.7 sq ft)
  - Radiative: 4.5 m^{2} (48 sq ft)
  - Tubes: 39.0 m^{2} (420 sq ft)
  - Evaporative: 43.5 m^{2} (468 sq ft)
- Cylinders: 2
- Cylinder size: 355 mm (14 in)
- Piston stroke: 530 mm (20 7/8 in)
- Valve gear: Allan
Career
- Retired: by 1967

The Saxon Class VII T were twin-coupled tank engines of the Royal Saxon State Railways designed for branch line (Sekundärbahn) operations. In 1925, the Deutsche Reichsbahn grouped these locomotives 1925 into their Class 98.70.

== History ==
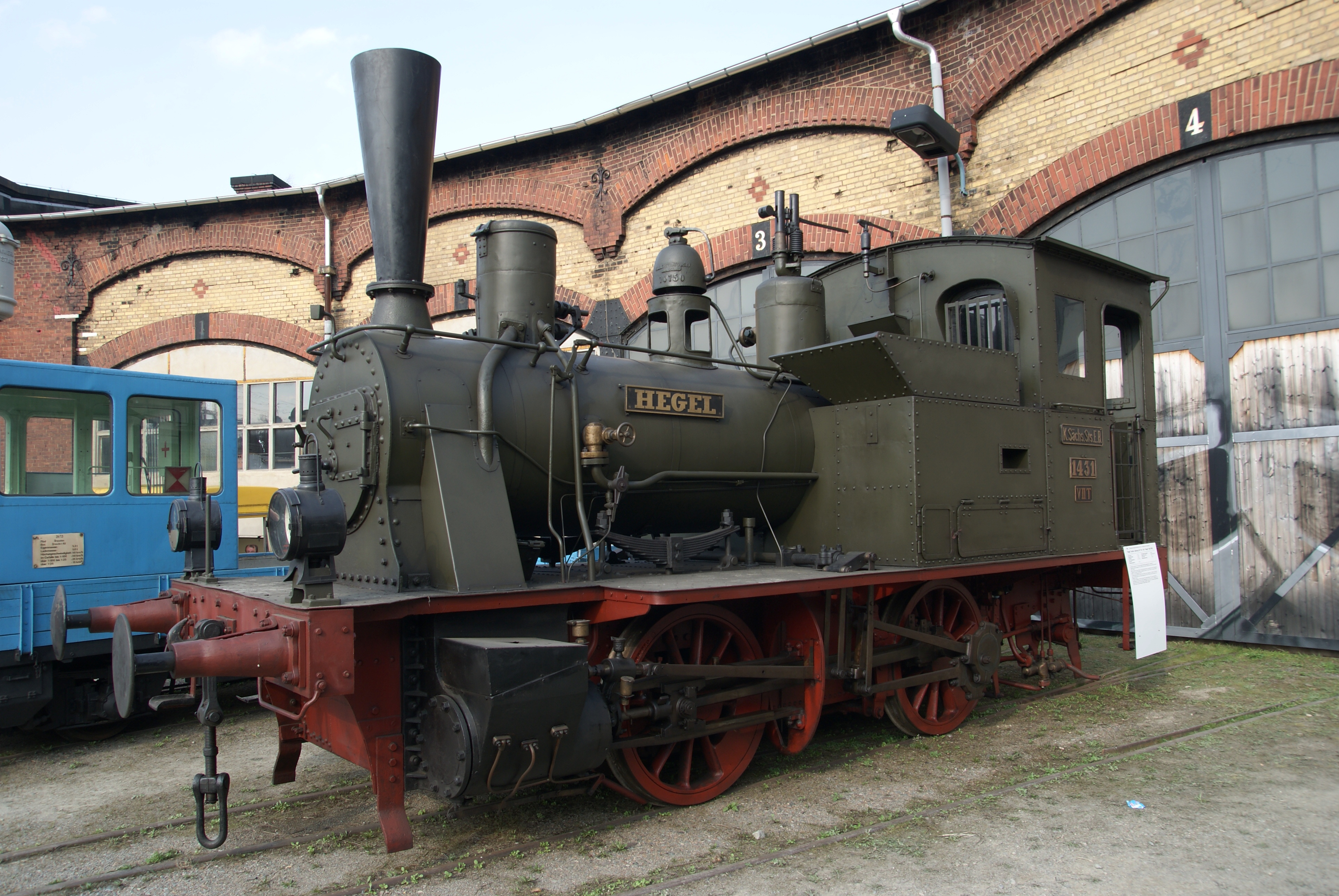
Locomotive HEGEL at the Dresden Steam Locomotive Festival in 2011

The Royal Saxon State Railways grouped all 0-4-0T locomotives into their Class VII T. As well as several engines that came from nationalised railway companies, this class also included 43 units procured by the Royal Saxon Railways themselves.

Forty-two largely identical locomotives were delivered by the Sächsische Maschinenfabrik, formerly Richard Hartmann, to the city of Chemnitz in the period from 1882 to 1894. Initially they were classified as H VII T, but from 1896 just as VII T.

Common to the different delivery batches were driving wheel diameters of 1,130 mm and axle bases of 2,200 mm. The length of the locomotive and the height of the centre of the boiler above the rails were also identical on all models. The locomotives of the last two batches had a steam dome, whilst the older ones just had a Regleraufsatz.

In 1925, the Deutsche Reichsbahn took over 29 locomotives of this type. Five dated to 1882/83 (98 7051 – 98 7055), eleven to 1886 (98 7056 – 98 7066), nine to 1890 (No. 98 7067 – 98 7075) and four to the year 1894 (98 7076 – 98 7079).

In 1931, no. 98 7069 became an industrial engine at the repair shop at Chemnitz, but was transferred to the Deutsche Reichsbahn fleet in 1951 as 98 7051. It was not decommissioned until 1967. Other long-serving engines were nos. 98 7065 and 98 7066 served until 1966.

The locomotive with number 98 7056 (formerly 1431 HEGEL) has survived. Until 1964 it belonged to the depot of Dresden-Altstadt and was then given to the Dresden Transport Museum. For many years it was part of their permanent exhibition. Today it has been stored in a museum depot in the old Bw Dresden-Altstadt and is maintained by the Dresden-Altstadt Depot Railway Museum.

== H VII T (98 7031) ==
VII T No. 1418 DR 98 7031
Type and origin
- Total produced: 1
Specifications
- Coupled dia.: 1,220 mm (48 in)
- Length
  - Over beams: 7,160 mm (23 ft 6 in)
- Adhesive weight: 21.8 t (21.5 long tons; 24.0 short tons)
- Service weight: 21.8 t (21.5 long tons; 24.0 short tons)
Performance figures
- Maximum speed: 45 km/h (28 mph)
Career
- Numbers: 1418
- First run: 1889
- Retired: 1927
- Technical data where different

Another engine built in 1889 by the Sächsische Maschinenfabrik with running number 1418 differed from the other H VII T stock in that it had a longer axle base (2,500 mm), larger coupled wheels and a higher top speed of 45 km/h. It also had a lower overall weight.

This locomotive also joined the Deutsche Reichsbahn fleet in 1925, as 98 7031. Until 1927 it was used as a shed loco in Bw Leipzig Hbf.

== See also ==
- List of Saxon locomotives and railbuses
- Royal Saxon State Railways
