= Saxon I F =

Type and origin
- Builder: Sächsische Maschinenfabrik, Chemnitz
- Build date: 1917
- Total produced: 1
Specifications
- Configuration
  - Whyte: 0-4-0F
- Gauge: 1,435 mm (4 ft 8 1/2 in)
- Driver dia.: 860 mm (2 ft 9 7/8 in)
- Axle load: 10.5 t (10.3 long tons; 11.6 short tons)
- Adhesive weight: 21.0 t (20.7 long tons; 23.1 short tons)
- Empty weight: 16.0 t (15.7 long tons; 17.6 short tons)
- Service weight: 21.0 t (20.7 long tons; 23.1 short tons)
- Boiler pressure: 12 kgf/cm^{2} (1,180 kPa; 171 lbf/in^{2})
- Cylinders: 2
- Cylinder size: 430 mm (16 15/16 in)
- Piston stroke: 400 mm (15 3/4 in)
- Valve gear: Heusinger
Career
- Numbers: I F No. 1

The Saxon I F (one F) was a class of one 0-4-0 fireless steam locomotive built for the Royal Saxon State Railways.

== History ==
The locomotive was manufactured in 1917 by the Sächsischen Maschinenfabrik in Chemnitz with the serial number 3981 for the Wülknitz Sleeper Works (Schwellentränkwerk Wülknitz; now the Oberbauwerk Wülknitz) as a shunting locomotive. For reasons of fire protection the use of a "fire-free" locomotive was desired, especially as there was enough available steam to operate the locomotive.

About 1970, the locomotive was withdrawn by Oberbauwerk Wülknitz, and was subsequently scrapped.

== Similar locomotives ==
Four similar locomotives were built for various industries between 1914 and 1916. The locomotives differed both in the dimensions of the steam engine and in the permitted operating pressure of the steam accumulator . One locomotive (for Lange of Auerhammer) was built as a crane locomotive.

Works No.	Year	Built for
3825	1914	Gottfried Lindner AG, Amendorf
3841	1914	Kr. Lange, Auerhammer
3880	1915	Kgl. Sächs. Pulverfabrik Gnaschwitz
3905	1916	Vereinigte Bautzner Papierfabriken

The Sächsische Maschinenfabrik built another locomotive in 1922 with the serial number 4536 for their own use.
