= Saxon XI HT =

German tank locomotive

Saxon XI HT DRG 94.19-21 ÖBB Class 794
Steam locomotive 94 2105 on the turntable of the railway museum at Schwarzenberg in the Ore Mountains (2 June 2001/photo by geme)
Manufacturer	Sächsische Maschinenfabrik, Chemnitz		
Quantity	10	18	136
Numbering	2019–2028; 94 1901–1908	2001–2018; 94 2001–2017	2029–2154; 94 2018–2139; 94 2151–2152
Entered service:	1910	1908–1909	1915–1923
Retired:	by 1936	by 1975	
Wheel arrangement:	0-10-0T		
Axle arrangement:	E h2t		
Type:	Gt 55.15	Gt 55.16	Gt 55.16
Track gauge:	1,435 mm (4 ft 8 1/2 in)		
Length over buffers:	12,080 mm (39 ft 7 1/2 in)	12,200 mm (40 ft 1/4 in)	12,390 mm (40 ft 7 3/4 in); 12,560 mm (41 ft 2 1/2 in) (from 2034)
Service weight:	74.1 t	77.3 t	79.4 t
Adhesive weight:	74.1 t	77.3 t	79.4 t
Axle load:	14.82 t	15.46 t	15.88 t
Driving wheel diameter:	1,260 mm (4 ft 1 5/8 in)		
Top speed:	45 km/h (28 mph)		60 km/h (37 mph)
Indicated power:	n.k.		
Piston stroke:	630 mm (24 13/16 in)		
Cylinder bore	590 mm (23 1/4 in)	620 mm (24 7/16 in)	
Boiler overpressure:	12 kg/cm^{2} (1,180 kPa; 171 psi)		
Grate area:	2.0 m^{2} (22 sq ft)	2.27 m^{2} (24.4 sq ft)	2.30 m^{2} (24.8 sq ft)
Evaporative heating area:	124.69 m^{2} (1,342.2 sq ft)	136.34 m^{2} (1,467.6 sq ft)	136.55 m^{2} (1,469.8 sq ft)
Superheater area:	36.7 m^{2} (395 sq ft)	41.4 m^{2} (446 sq ft)	
Brakes:	Steam brake Later fitted with Westinghouse compressed-air brake some with Riggenbach counter-pressure brake		

The Saxon Class XI $\textstyle \mathfrak{H}$T were German, 0-10-0, tank locomotives with the Royal Saxon State Railways procured for goods train services. The Deutsche Reichsbahn grouped them in 1925 into their DRG Class 94.19-21.

== History ==
As a consequence of the reparations required to be paid by Germany after the First World War, 13 locomotives went to the French: 12 to the Chemins de Fer de l'État as 50-901 to 50-912, and one to the Chemins de Fer du Nord as 5.526; a further 3 engines had been lost during the course of the war.

The Deutsche Reichsbahn grouped the lighter engines of the second batch into its DRG Class 94.19, whilst the heavier ones were designated as DRG Class 94.20-21. The engines of the lighter group were retired by 1936.

All those engines left in Germany after the Second World War went into the Deutsche Reichsbahn in East Germany. The DR also received two former État engines from France and grouped them as numbers 94 2151 and 94 2152. The last ones were in service until the second half of the 1970s.

The non-working locomotive, 94 2110, ended up after the war in Austria after passing through Czechoslovakia and Hungary. It was incorporated into the fleet of the Austrian Federal Railway as ÖBB 794.2110, but was retired in 1953 without having been used.

Of the locomotives remaining in Czechoslovakia after the war, several continued to be used for a time. Locomotive 94 2021 was even given the ČSD number 516.0500 and was not retired until 1952.

The last area of operations for these locomotives in the Deutsche Reichsbahn was on the ramp from Eibenstock upper station to Eibenstock lower station which was closed in autumn 1975.

The last preserved locomotive of this class - number 94 2105 - may be found today in the railway museum at Schwarzenberg/Erzgeb.

== Technical features ==
The engines of the second batch had a lower weight, due to their shorter boiler and a reduction in the coal and water capacity, in order to be able to run on branch lines with light trackway.

From running number 2094 (1921 series) onwards the locomotives had factory-fitted compressed-air brakes, from running number 2112 (1923 series) the engines were equipped with Knorr feedwater heaters on the crown of the boiler barrel behind the chimney. Those engines delivered prior to that were all retrofitted with compressed-air brakes and, in most cases, also with surface economisers. The 1908/09 series only rarely had preheaters. Where they were fitted they were located to the side of the chimney.

== Sources ==
- Davies, John (August 2001). Chemins de fer de l'État Locomotive List 1878–1938. Woodbridge, Queensland: Dr. John Davies. ISBN 0-7316-8442-7.
- Davies, John (January 1997). Chemins de fer du Nord Locomotive List 1842–1938. Sunnybank, Queensland: Dr. John Davies. ISBN 0-646-30938-2.
- Reiche, Günther (1998). Richard Hartmann und seine Lokomotiven (in German). Oberbaumverlag Berlin/Chemnitz. ISBN 3-928254-56-1.
- Spielhoff, Lothar (1990). Länderbahn-Dampf-Lokomotiven. Band 1: Preußen, Mecklenburg, Oldenburg, Sachsen und Elsaß-Lothringen (in German). Stuttgart: Franckh'sche Verlagshandlung. ISBN 3-440-06145-0.
- Weisbrod, Manfred; Müller, Hans; Petznik, Wolfgang (1978). Dampflokomotiven deutscher Eisenbahnen, Baureihe 60–96 (EFA 1.3) (in German) (4th ed.). Düsseldorf: Alba. pp. 212–216. ISBN 3-87094-083-2.

== See also ==
- Royal Saxon State Railways
- List of Saxon locomotives and railbuses
