= Saxon V =

Saxon V DRG Class 53.82
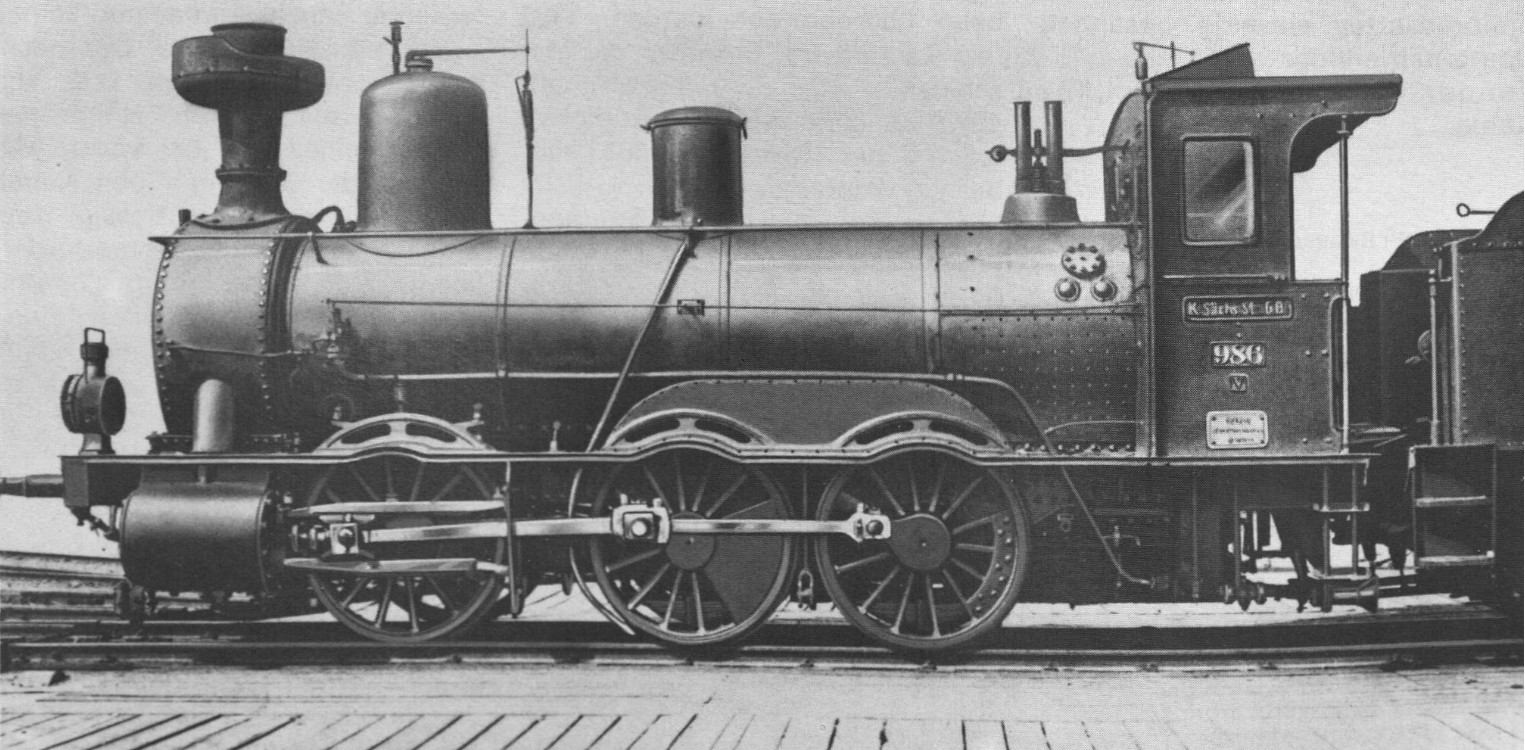
Type and origin
- Total produced: 173
Specifications
- Configuration
  - Whyte: 0-6-0
  - UIC: C n2
- Driver dia.: 1,370 mm (4 ft 5 7/8 in)
- Axle load: 12.1 t
- Adhesive weight: 36.3 t
- Service weight: 36.3 t
- Boiler pressure: 7 kgf/cm^{2} (686 kPa; 99.6 lbf/in^{2})
- Heating surface
  - Firebox: 1.4 m^{2} (15 sq ft)
  - Evaporative: 110.6 m^{2} (1,190 sq ft)
- Cylinder size: 610 mm (24 in)
- Piston stroke: 457 mm (18 in)
Performance figures
- Maximum speed: 45 km/h (28 mph)

The Saxon Class Vs were German, six-coupled, goods train, tender locomotives operated by the Royal Saxon State Railways.

They were the predecessors of the Saxon Class V V. Between 1859 and 1887 they were delivered in three batches of 24, 31 and 118 engines. They had an overhanging outer firebox and a steam dome. They had different types of valve gear; Allan, Gooch and Stephenson valve gear all being used at different stages. The first batch had Dampfschlitten brakes, the second steam-operated brake blocks and the third had Westinghouse compressed-air brakes.

The Deutsche Reichsbahn took over 11 machines, which were given the numbers 53 8201 to 53 8211, and all were withdrawn from services by 1927.

== See also ==
- Royal Saxon State Railways
- List of Saxon locomotives and railbuses
- Narrow gauge railways in Saxony
