= Saxon IX V =

Saxon IX V, IX HV DRG Class 56.5–6
Type and origin
- Builder: Sächsische Maschinenfabrik
- Build date: IX V: 1902–1905; IX HV:1907–1908
- Total produced: 50
Specifications
- Configuration
  - Whyte: 2-8-0
- Leading dia.: 1,065 mm (3 ft 5 7/8 in)
- Driver dia.: 1,260 mm (4 ft 1 5/8 in)
- Length
  - Over beams: 17,514 mm (57 ft 5 1/2 in)
- Axle load: 15 t (15 long tons; 17 short tons)
- Adhesive weight: 60 t (59 long tons; 66 short tons)
- Service weight: 72 t (71 long tons; 79 short tons)
- Boiler pressure: 14.0 kg/cm^{2} (1.37 MPa; 199 psi)
- Heating surface
  - Firebox: 3.17 m^{2} (34.1 sq ft)
  - Evaporative: 180.56 m^{2} (1,943.5 sq ft)
- High-pressure cylinder: 530 mm (20 7/8 in)
- Low-pressure cylinder: 770 mm (30 5/16 in)
- Piston stroke: 630 mm (24 13/16 in)
Performance figures
- Maximum speed: 50 km/h (31 mph)
- Indicated power: 1,300 PS (956 kW; 1,280 hp)
Career
- Numbers: IX $\textstyle \mathfrak{V}$: KSäStE 750–770 → DRG 56 501–516; IX $\textstyle \mathfrak{H}\mathfrak{V}$: KSäStE 771–800 → DRG 56 601–625

The Saxon Class IX $\textstyle \mathfrak{V}$ was a class of German, eight-coupled, tender locomotives built for the Royal Saxon State Railways (Königlich Sächsische Staatseisenbahnen) for goods train duties.

== History ==
These steam locomotives were brought into service, after it was clear that the Saxon Class I V (later DRG Class 55) could no longer the demands placed on it. The locomotive had a hollow, Klien-Lindner axle at the back and, initially, a long steam collection pipe above the centre of the boiler which was replaced on later models by two steam domes and a connecting pipe. Twenty machines were delivered by the firm of Hartmann as wet steam engines, a further 30 with a Schmidt smoke tube superheater.

The Deutsche Reichsbahn took over 16 of the first series and gave them the running numbers 56 501–56 516. Of the second batch, 25 were taken on with numbers 56 601–56 625.

The vehicle were coupled with tenders of Saxon classes sä 3 T 9, sä 3 T 12 or sä 3 T 13.

== See also ==
- Royal Saxon State Railways
- List of Saxon locomotives and railbuses
