= Saxon VIb V =

Saxon VIb V DRG Class 34.80
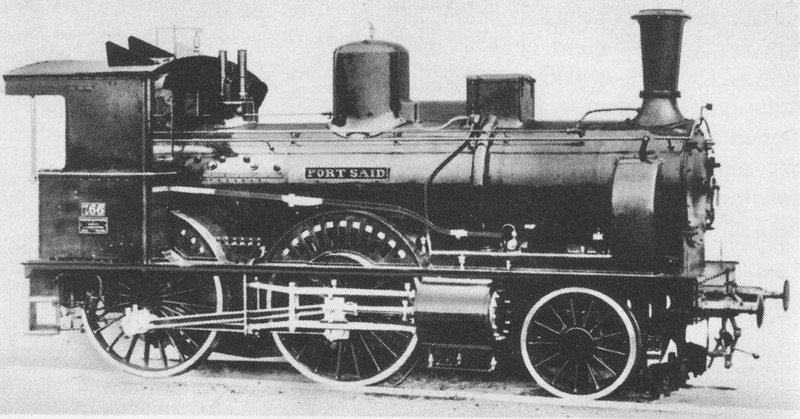
Type and origin
- Builder: Sächsische Maschinenfabrik
- Build date: 1889
- Total produced: 14
Specifications
- Configuration
  - Whyte: 2-4-0
  - UIC: 1′B n2v
- Gauge: 1,435 mm (4 ft 8 1/2 in)
- Leading dia.: 1,230 mm (4 ft 3/8 in)
- Driver dia.: 1,875 mm (6 ft 1 7/8 in)
- Length
  - Over beams: 15,083 mm (49 ft 5 3/4 in)
- Axle load: 131.4 kN
- Adhesive weight: 260.9 kN
- Service weight: 367.7 kN
- Boiler pressure: 12 kg/cm^{2} (1,180 kPa; 171 psi)
- Heating surface
  - Firebox: 1.82 m^{2} (19.6 sq ft)
  - Evaporative: 102.13 m^{2} (1,099.3 sq ft)
- Cylinders: 2
- High-pressure cylinder: 440 mm (17 5/16 in)
- Low-pressure cylinder: 650 mm (25 9/16 in)
- Piston stroke: 560 mm (22 1/16 in)
- Valve gear: Allan
Performance figures
- Maximum speed: 85 km/h (53 mph)
Career
- Numbers: VIb V 161–174; DRG 34 8011

The Saxon Class VIb $\textstyle \mathfrak{V}$ were four-coupled, tender locomotives in express train service with the Royal Saxon State Railways. In 1925, the Deutsche Reichsbahn grouped these engines into DRG Class 34.8.

== History ==
The Saxon Class VIb V locomotives were built from 1889 onwards in a total of 14 units by the Hartmann and were designed for hauling express trains. They were mostly retired by 1922. The Reichsbahn took over just one engine and gave it the running number 34 8011. It was retired in 1925.

== Technical features ==
These locomotives were the first compound locomotives in Saxony. Its two-cylinder, compound engine was located behind the carrying axle and drove the final axle. The locomotives had an inside Allan valve gear. The steam dome was in the centre of the boiler over the middle axle. The running gear had an improved Nowotny carrying axle, nevertheless it did not have good riding qualities. The Schleifer brakes were later converted to Westinghouse brakes.

== See also ==
- Royal Saxon State Railways
- List of Saxon locomotives and railbuses
