= Saxon III =

Saxon III DRG Class 34.76
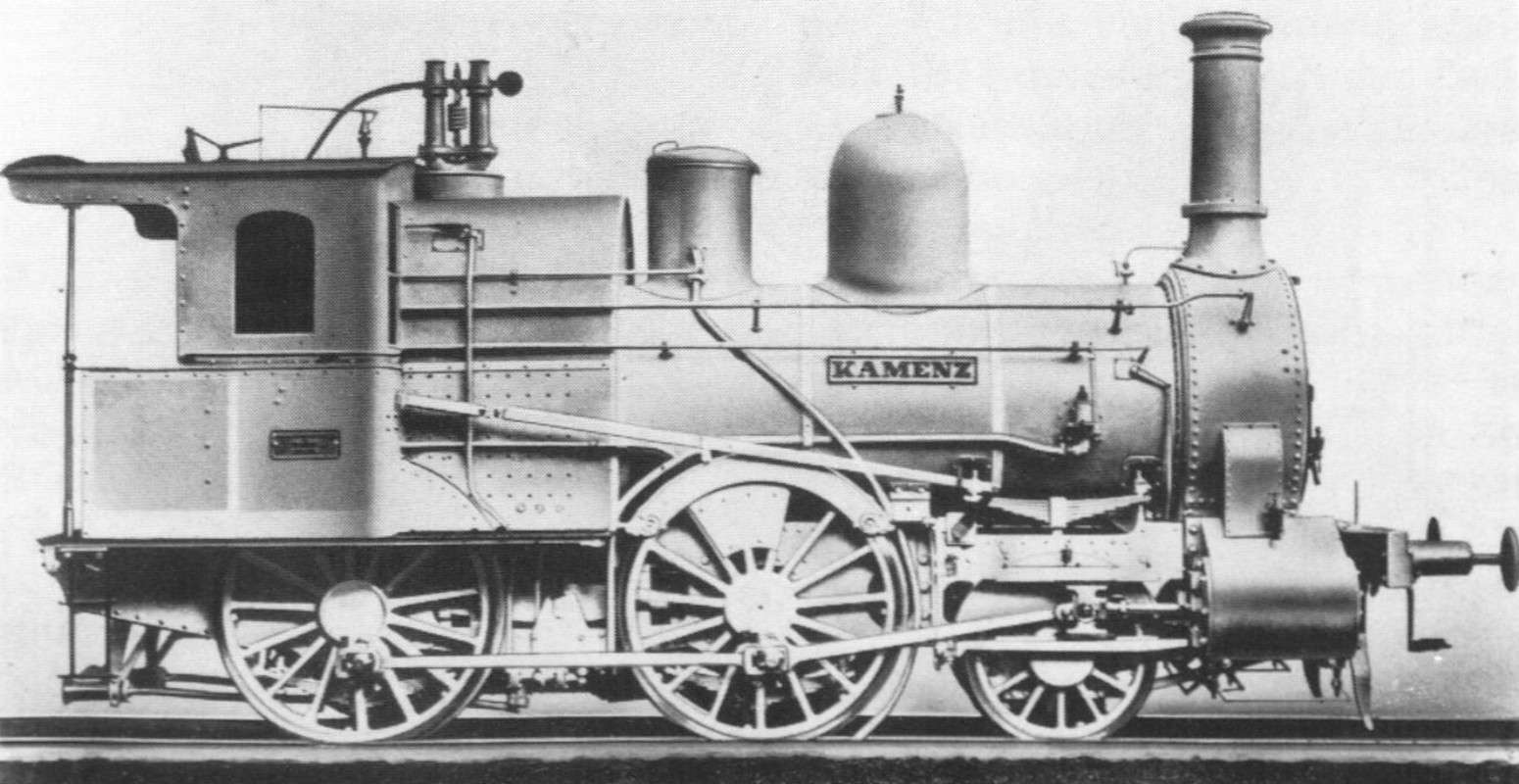
Type and origin
- Builder: Sächsische Maschinenfabrik (66); Maschinenfabrik Esslingen (21)
- Build date: 1871–1873
- Total produced: 87
Specifications
- Leading dia.: 1,035 mm (3 ft 4 3/4 in)
- Driver dia.: 1,560 mm (5 ft 1 3/8 in)
- Length
  - Over beams: 13,035 mm (42 ft 9 1/4 in)
- Adhesive weight: 25.76 tonnes (25.35 long tons; 28.40 short tons)
- Service weight: 37.17 tonnes (36.58 long tons; 40.97 short tons)
- Boiler pressure: 8 kg/cm^{2} (780 kPa; 110 psi)
- Heating surface
  - Firebox: 1.60 m^{2} (17.2 sq ft)
  - Evaporative: 91.93 m^{2} (989.5 sq ft)
- Cylinders: Two
- Cylinder size: 406 mm (16 in)
- Piston stroke: 560 mm (22 1/16 in)
Performance figures
- Maximum speed: 70 km/h (43 mph)
Career
- Numbers: KSäStE (new): 201–266 (SM), 276–273 (ME); KSäStE (1916): 243–280 (SM), 281–284 (ME); DRG: 34 7611

The Saxon Class III were early, four-coupled, tender locomotives operated by the Royal Saxon State Railways for express services. The Deutsche Reichsbahn grouped these engines in 1925 into their DRG Class 34.76.

== History ==
The Saxon III was built in 1871 and 1872 by the Hartmann (66 examples) and the Maschinenfabrik Esslingen (21 examples). Fourteen of the Esslingen engines were subsequently given a Nowotny-Klien bogie instead of the original fixed leading wheels and were then reclassified as the IIIb.

The Reichsbahn only took over one of the unmodified engines - no. 274 BRÜNN and number her as locomotive 34 7611.

== See also ==
- Royal Saxon State Railways
- List of Saxon locomotives and railbuses
