= Johann Friedrich Ludwig Wöhlert =

German businessman

Johann Friedrich Ludwig Wöhlert (16 September 1797 – 31 March 1877) was a German businessman. Johann Wöhlert was born on 16 September 1797 in Kiel in north Germany. Trained as a joiner, in 1818 Wöhlert went to Berlin. Here he worked until 1836 at the engineering works of Franz Anton Egells and thereafter in the iron foundry and engineering works of August Borsig at Oranienburger Tor.

== Business ==
In 1842 Wöhlert founded his own engineering works and iron foundry at Berlin's Chausseestrasse No. 29, where he manufactured locomotives. In 1872 the concern became a public limited company (Aktiengesellschaft). This went bankrupt in 1879 – after his death.

== Residences ==
During his time as an industrialist Wöhlert always lived near his factory:

- from 1836, during his time with August Borsig, he lived at Chausseestrasse 36,
- in 1842, the year his company was founded, he lived at Torstrasse 52,
- from 1844 he lived at Chausseestrasse 29.

In addition he acquired a summer residence in Hangelsberg/ Spree bei Fürstenwalde. There iron products from his factory can be seen in several buildings. The cross on the Hangelsberg church came from his foundry.

== Death ==
Wöhlert died on 31 March 1877 in Berlin and was laid to rest in the Invalidenfriedhof cemetery in central Berlin.

== Recognition ==
The street of Wöhlertstrasse, laid in 1888, which ran from Chausseestrasse to Pflugstrasse was named after him on 12 March 1889.
