= Kirchweger condenser =

The purpose of the Kirchweger condenser (German: Kirchweger-Kondensationseinrichtung or Kirchwegersche Abdampfkondensation) was to preheat feedwater in a steam locomotive using the exhaust steam from the engine. It was invented in 1850 by Heinrich Kirchweger. A similar system was developed by Rohrbeck.

== Overview ==
Exhaust steam was extracted from the steam chest and fed through a 100 mm diameter pipe under the locomotive to the tender. There the steam was fed directly into the feedwater, which thus heated up to boiling point. The remaining steam was allowed to escape to atmosphere through a second chimney on the tender. The quantity of steam could be regulated using a cock on the tender. The Rohrbeck system differed in detail from the Kirchweger condenser, in which steam was removed at the blast pipe and led away along the top of the boiler. The system was regulated by a throttle valve on the blast pipe.

== Fuel savings ==
Using such a system, fuel savings of between 10 and 20% were possible, depending on the operating conditions. In some circumstances even as much as 30% could be saved. The Lower Silesian-Märkisch Railway (Niederschlesisch-Märkische Eisenbahn) put this saving at 7.5% on its locomotives.

== Contamination ==
However the contamination of boiler feedwater with foreign bodies was a problem. Old sources report erosion of the boiler plates which was caused by fatty acids contained in the lubricant accompanying the exhaust steam. On the other hand, the formation of scale in the boiler was delayed because a proportion of the boiler scale constituents had already been left behind in the tender.

== Withdrawal ==
With the introduction of injectors for feeding water into the boiler, exhaust steam condensers were taken out of use from the 1860s, because injectors could only handle cold water. By about 1880, around 900 German locomotives had been fitted with condensing apparatus.

== See also ==
- Condensing steam locomotive
- Feedwater heater
