= Carrying wheel =

Steam locomotive component

A carrying wheel on a steam locomotive is a wheel that is not driven; i.e., it is uncoupled and can run freely, unlike a coupled or driving wheel. It is also described as a running wheel and its axle may be called a carrying axle. A carrying wheel is referred to as leading wheel if it is at the front, or a trailing wheel if it is at the rear of the locomotive.

== Weight distribution ==
In particular reference to steam engines, the carrying wheels have a very important purpose of allowing the engine's weight distribution to be altered. For example in the use of leading wheels it would allow the boiler to be located further forward of the driving wheels, the weight of which counters the leverage imposed by the drawbar and the load of the pulled wagons/cars about the fulcrum of the rearmost driving wheel. Similarly the trailing wheels can move the fulcrum to the rearmost trailing wheel. Such change can dramatically improve the operating speeds of engines and their tractive effort.
