= Royal Saxon State Railways =

State-owned railways in the Kingdom of Saxony (1869–1918)

Flag of the Kingdom of Saxony

The Royal Saxon State Railways (German: Königlich Sächsische Staatseisenbahnen) were the state-owned railways operating in the Kingdom of Saxony from 1869 to 1918. From 1918 until their merger into the Deutsche Reichsbahn the title 'Royal' was dropped and they were just called the Saxon State Railways (Sächsische Staatseisenbahnen).

== History ==
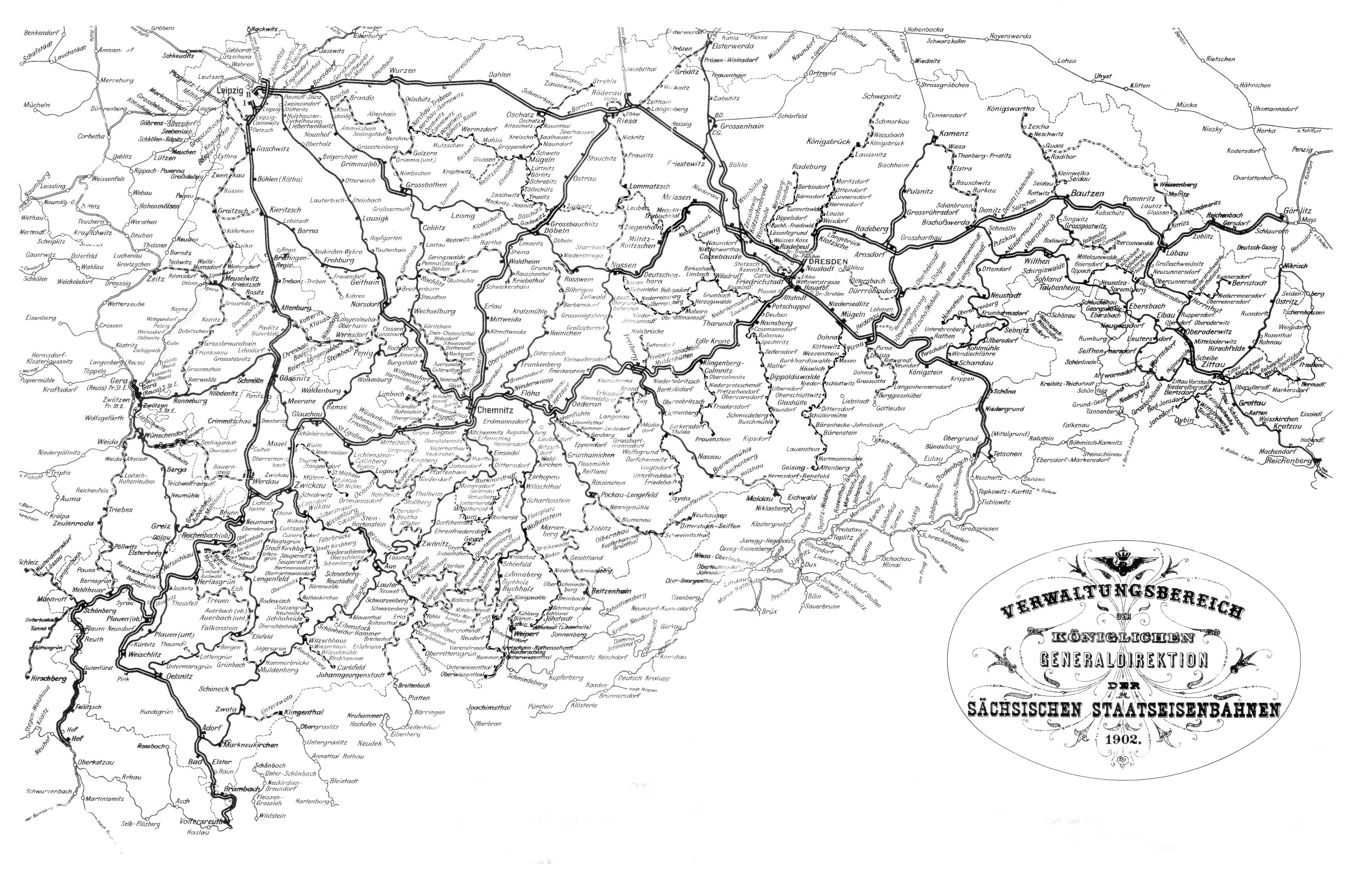
Railway network of the Royal Saxon State Railways (1902)

=== En route to a state railway ===
After the completion of the privately financed Leipzig–Dresden railway in 1839, the Saxon parliament also began to get involved in railway construction. Early on it was recognised that railway lines to Bavaria, Bohemia and Silesia were needed and that there ought to be a route running north-to-south through the kingdom. The funding of this plan lay in the hands of privately financed railway committees. The state, however, saw itself arranging for the corresponding political and legal hurdles to be cleared. On 14 January 1841 a treaty was agreed with the Kingdom of Bavaria and the Duchy of Saxony-Altenburg for the construction of a railway route between Leipzig and Hof. On 22 June 1841, the Saxon-Bavarian Railway Company was founded and on 19 September 1842 railway services between Leipzig and Altenburg station were opened. Because the construction costs exceeded the planned limits, the state had to jump in and honour its previously made promise to complete the construction at the national expense. On 1 April 1847 the railway line, which was finished as far as Reichenbach im Vogtland was transferred to state ownership.

At the same time the Royal Saxon-Bavarian State Railway Division (Königlichen Direction der Sächsisch-Bayerischen Staatseisenbahn) in Leipzig began work. Specific regulations were laid down by the state parliament. The board of directors was accordingly given the appropriate powers and was assigned directly to a state ministry. The payroll of the officials was to be approved by the state parliament and railway fares by the provincial legislature. In addition to funding for the construction of the line, in particular the Göltzsch Viaduct and Elster Viaduct, agreements had to be reached with Saxony-Altenburg and Bavaria over owning and operating relationships. On 15 July 1851, the line to Hof (Saale) was completed.

Because no suitable private company had been found to build the Saxony-Bohemian Railway from Dresden to Bodenbach, the state took over this task itself. On the opening of the section from Dresden to Pirna on 1 August 1848, Saxony had its second state railway line, for which the 'Royal Division for the Construction and Operation of the Saxony-Bohemia Railway' (Königliche Direction für Bau und Betrieb der Sächsisch-Böhmischen Staatseisenbahn) was established, with a head office in Dresden.

On 24 July 1843 a treaty was concluded with the Kingdom of Prussia for the construction of a railway route from Dresden via Bautzen to the Prussia towns of Görlitz and Bunzlau. That made it possible to put in the important link to Breslau.

On 1 September 1847, the 102 km long route from Dresden to Görlitz was opened by the Saxon-Silesian Railway (Sächsisch-Schlesische Eisenbahn), a private company that had formed with state support. On 31 January 1851 this company was transferred to state ownership. At the same time the running powers of the private Löbau-Zittau Railway Company (Löbau-Zittauer Eisenbahn-Gesellschaft) were taken over. By combining the management of the two lines radiating from Dresden savings were supposed to be made. Thus, the 'Royal Division of Saxon-Bohemian and Saxon-Silesian State Railways in Dresden (Königliche Direction der Sächsisch-Böhmischen und Sächsisch-Schlesischen Staatseisenbahnen in Dresden) was formed, which on 14 December 1852 was thankfully renamed to the rather more succinct 'Royal Dresden State Railway Division' (Königliche Staatseisenbahn-Direction zu Dresden).

On 1 October 1853 the 'Royal Chemnitz-Riesa State Railway Division' (Königliche Direktion der Chemnitzer-Riesaer Staatseisenbahn) was established. It had the task of completing the construction of the Riesa–Chemnitz railway and running the line subsequently. This had been necessary, after the private firm, the Chemnitz-Riesa Railway Company, had gone bankrupt due to the cost of structures needed between Waldheim und Döbeln.

Unlike Prussia, Saxony never issued a railway law. This meant that every railway proposal had to be agreed in the state parliament. In spite of the negative experiences of the past, the next ten years saw an increase in the construction of state railways. The work was not without problems, due to geographical difficulties. The extension of the route between Chemnitz and Riesa as well as the line from Freiberg to Tharandt were technically challenging and correspondingly expensive.

On 15 November 1858 the line from Chemnitz to Zwickau was completed. That meant there was now a link from Riesa to the Saxon-Bavarian Railway over the line from Zwickau that had been built in 1845. As a result, the Chemnitz Division was disbanded and the management of its routes transferred to the Leipzig Division, which was given the title of "Royal Division of the State's Western Railways" (Königliche Direktion der westlichen Staatseisenbahn). At the same time the Dresden Division was renamed the "Royal Division of the State's Eastern Railways" (Königliche Direktion der östlichen Staatseisenbahnen).

In 1862 the state railways had an overall length of 525 km. In addition to the Leipzig-Dresden Railway, there were now private coal railways in the Saxon coal regions of Zwickau and Döhlen, as well as the Zittau-Reichenberg Railway. The state however had an 11/12 stake in the latter.

By 1865 links from Leipzig to Corbetha and Bitterfeld, and hence connexions to Magdeburg and Berlin, were established as well as the Voigtländ State Railway (Herlasgrün–Eger).

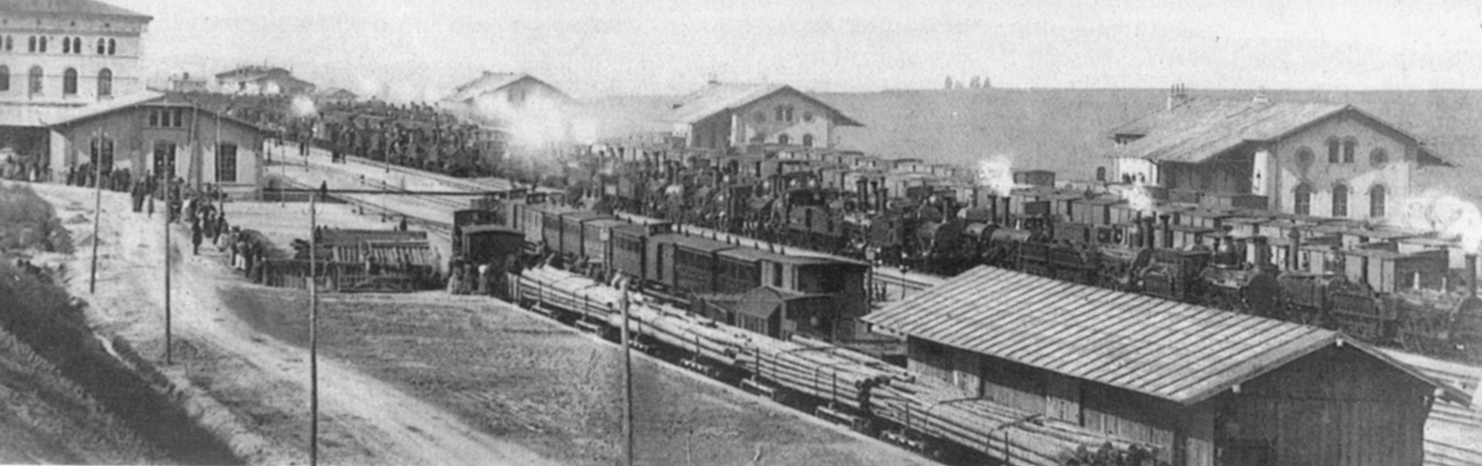
Locomotives during the 'locomotive escape' in 1866 at Eger station

One crucial event in the history of Saxon railway operations turned out to be the Austro-Prussian War of 1866 between Prussia and Austria. Because Saxony was on the Austrian side, it evacuated all the locomotives to Hof, Eger and Budapest when Prussian troops invaded. During the course of the war the Ostrau Viaduct and the bridge over the Elbe at Riesa were destroyed. In the subsequent peace treaty, Prussia was given ownership of those sections of the Silesian Railway that ran through its territory as well as Görlitz station. A Prussian route from Leipzig to Zeitz also had to be permitted.

In the following years the railway network was further expanded. Lines in the upper Ore Mountains appeared after Schwarzenberg/Erzgeb. was given a railway connexion in 1858. In 1866, the railway to Annaberg-Buchholz joined the network and the line to Weipert followed in 1872. The most important reason was the transportation of brown coal from the north Bohemian basin. In 1869 the gap between Flöha and Freiberg was finally closed and the two networks joined together.

As a result, on 1 July 1869, the Leipzig and Dresden divisions were merged into the new "Royal General Division of the Saxon State Railways" (Königlichen Generaldirection der sächsischen Staatseisenbahnen), abbreviated to K. Sächs. Sts. E. B. “, in Dresden.

One of the managing directors of the Saxon state railways was the privy councillor, Otto von Tschirschky and Bögendorff, the father-in-law of the later General Paul von der Planitz.

=== Further expansion ===
The years after the foundation of the Reich in 1871 were also marked, in Saxony, by a large number of private railway construction projects. However, in most cases the state had to come to their aid in order to complete the planned routes and to continue to run them. In addition, further building work was carried out in order to expand the network. The construction of railways made it possible to site industry even in the villages of the Ore Mountains and the Lausitz and to foster under-developed regions. On 1 July 1876 the state took over the Leipzig-Dresden railway and thereby increased the network length by 337.5 km. Subsequently, almost all remaining private railway companies in Saxony were taken over in order to be ready for a planned Reich railway project under Prussian leadership.

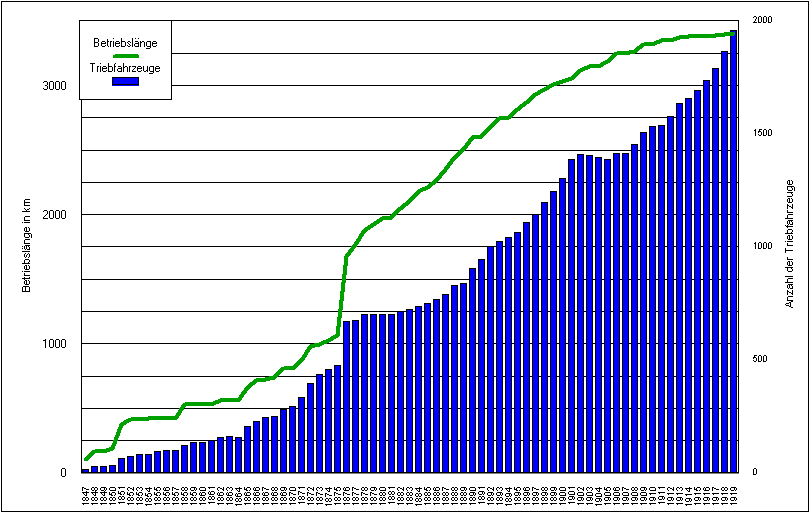
Development of the railway network and the locomotive fleet

Because the construction and operations of lines was not always covered by the profits, ways to simplify things began to be investigated. As early as 1865 the engineer's forum of the Union of German Railway Administrations (Verein Deutscher Eisenbahnverwaltungen) set out principles for secondary lines. These were legally implemented in 1878 as part of the 'Railway Regulations for German Railways of Lower Importance' (Bahnordnung für deutsche Eisenbahnen untergeordneter Bedeutung). The routes built to these simpler regulations were known in Saxony as 'secondary lines' or Sekundärbahnen (Singular: Sekundärbahn). Twenty-six routes totalling 453 km were immediately run as Sekundärbahnen and in 1879 the first newly built Sekundärbahn, the suburban route from Leipzig to Gaschwitz via Plagwitz.

Because even Sekundärbahnen did not produce the desired savings in every case, in 1881 the construction of the first 750 mm (2 ft 5 1/2 in) narrow gauge railways began. On 17 October 1881 the section of line between Wilkau and Kirchberg (Sachsen) was opened. By 1920 Saxon narrow gauge railways had a total length of 519.88 km.

The most important railway structures were the Dresden Hauptbahnhof built from 1891 to 1901 and the Leipzig Hauptbahnhof which was finished in 1915. Both were linked to the cities with extensive modifications to the railway yards.

On the abdication of King Friedrich August III in 1918 and the transformation of the kingdom to a free state, the appellation 'Royal' (Königlich) was dropped and the railway administration in Saxony called itself the 'Saxon State Railways' (Sächsische Staatseisenbahnen or Sächs. Sts. E.B.). The Saxon State Railways brought 3370 km of track into the Deutsche Reichsbahn network in 1920.

== Railway network ==
The railway network included, for one, the north–south links from Leipzig via Plauen to Hof, from Riesa to Chemnitz and from Elsterwerda to Dresden and Schöna as well as the east–west links from Plauen via Chemnitz to Dresden, from Leipzig to Dresden and from Dresden to Görlitz. The industrialised Ore Mountains were especially well linked by several stub lines along the river valleys. In places these routes crossed the watershed of the Ore Mountains and joined up with the Bohemian railway network.

An overview of the individual routes may be found in the German List of railway lines in Saxony.

In the animation, you can see the extensions of the rail network from 1840.

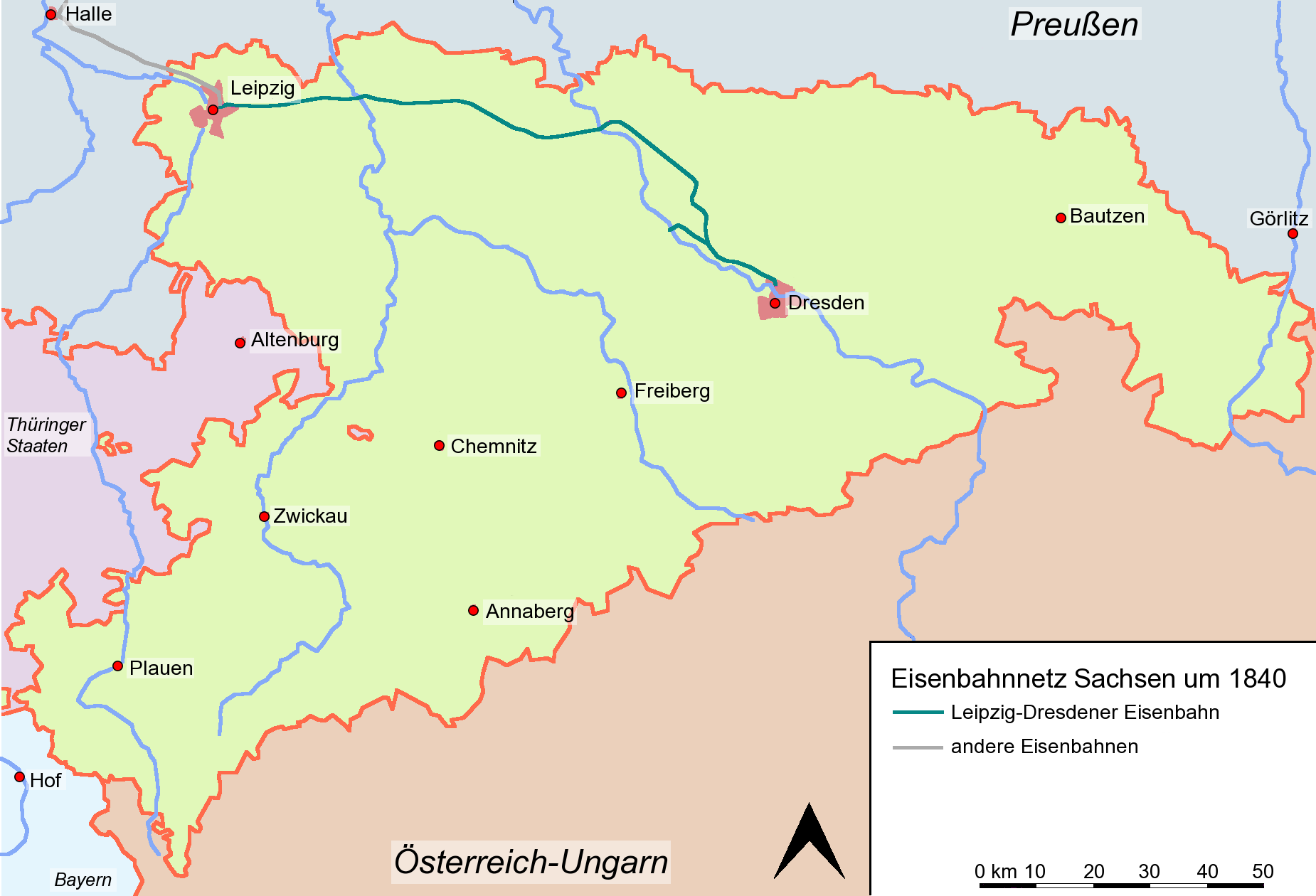
to 1840

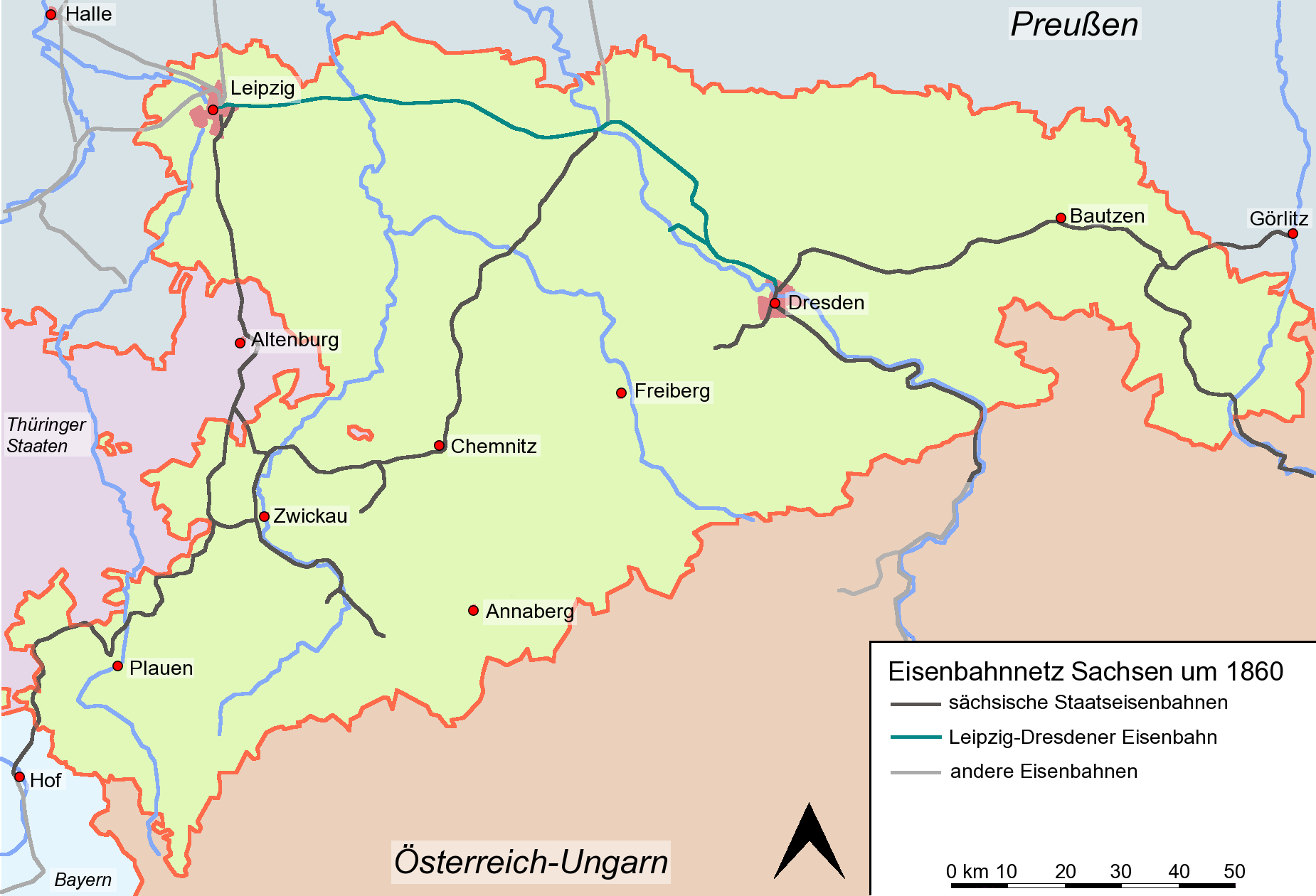
to 1860

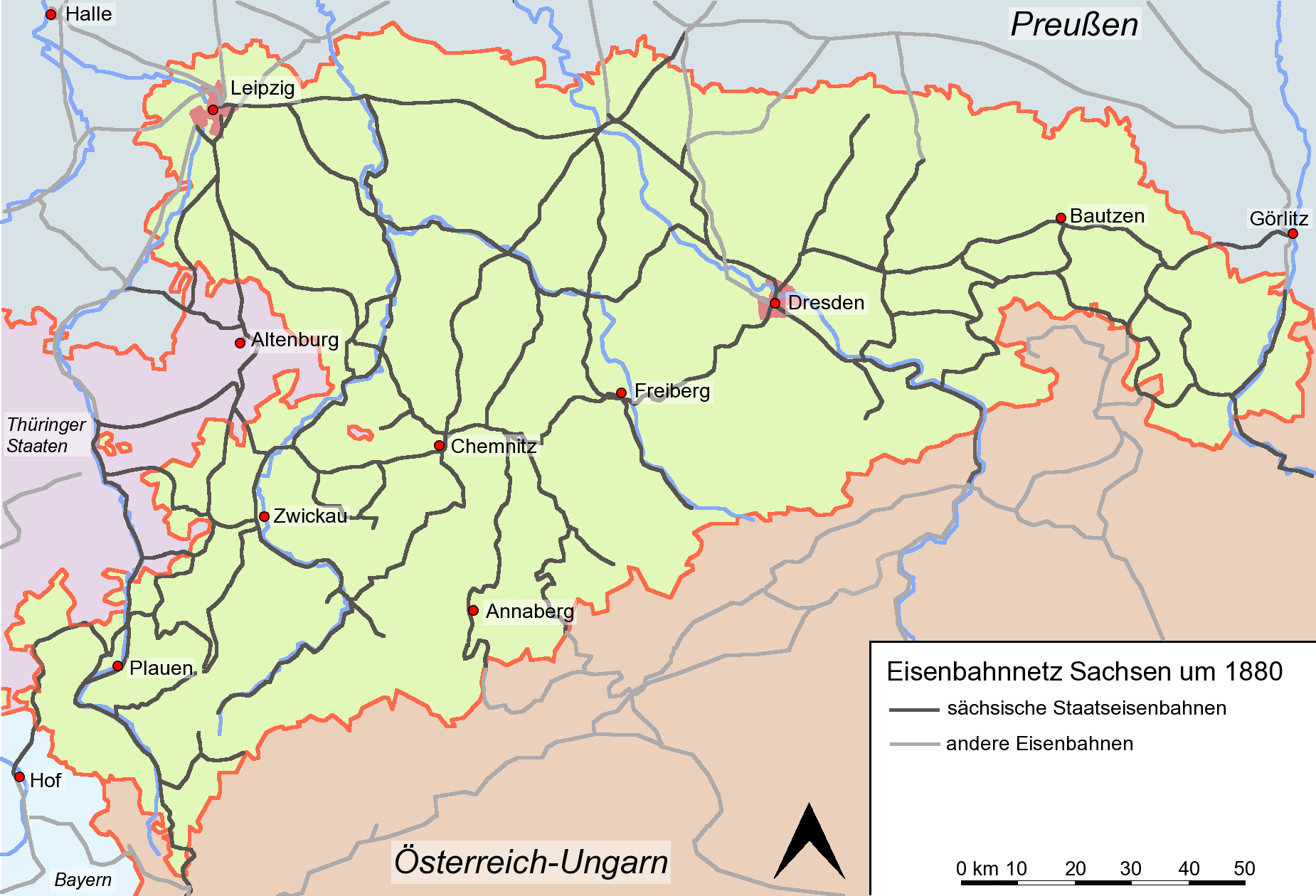
to 1880

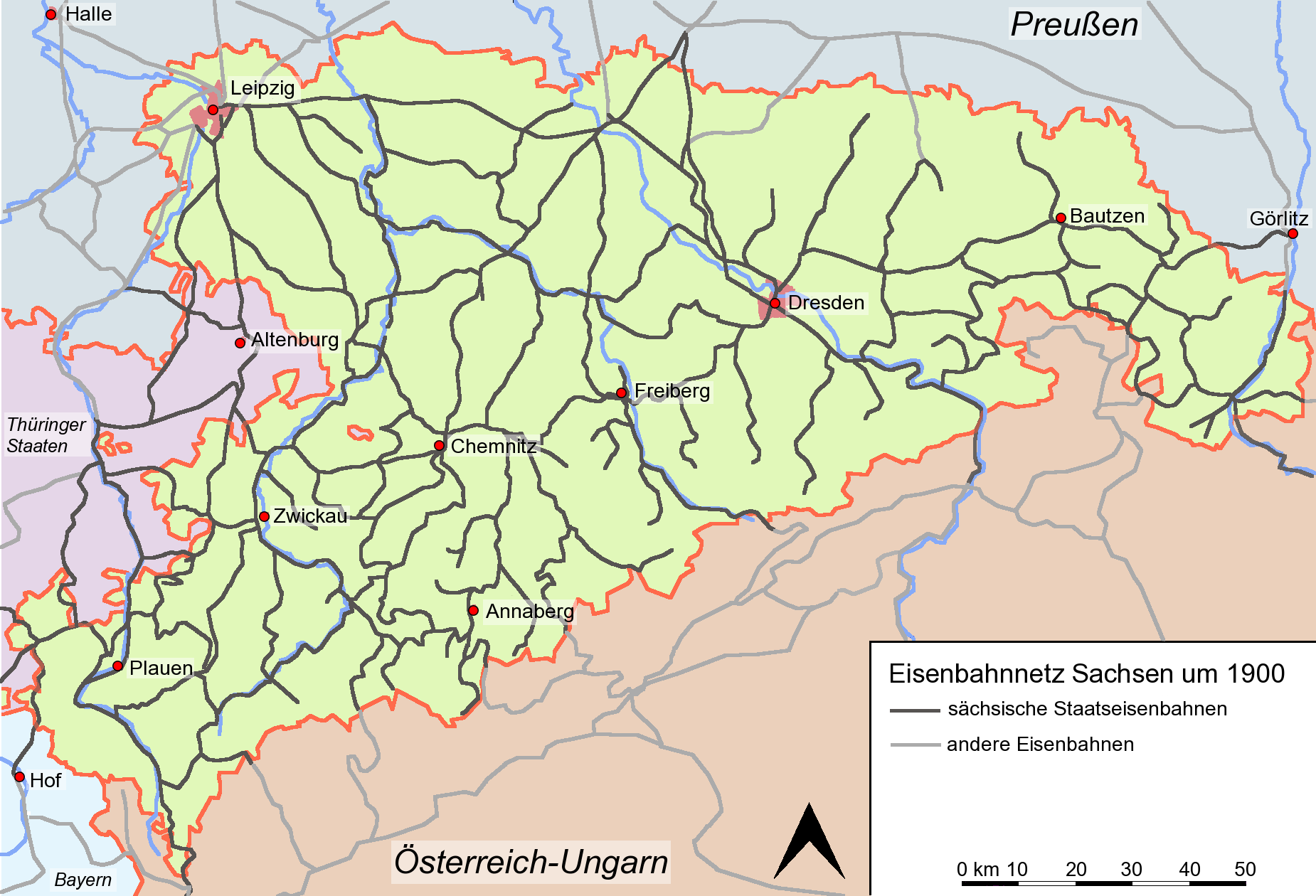
to 1900

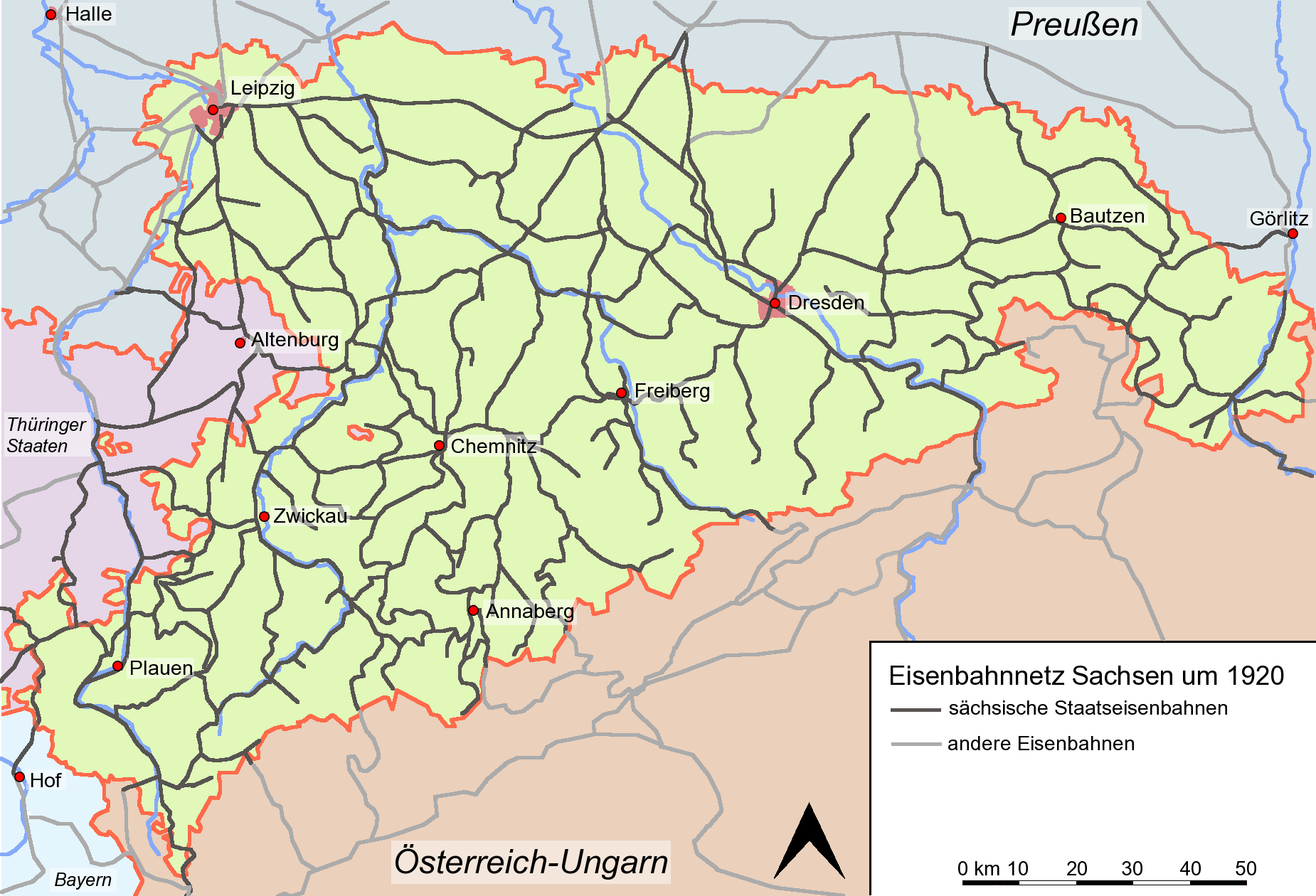
to 1920

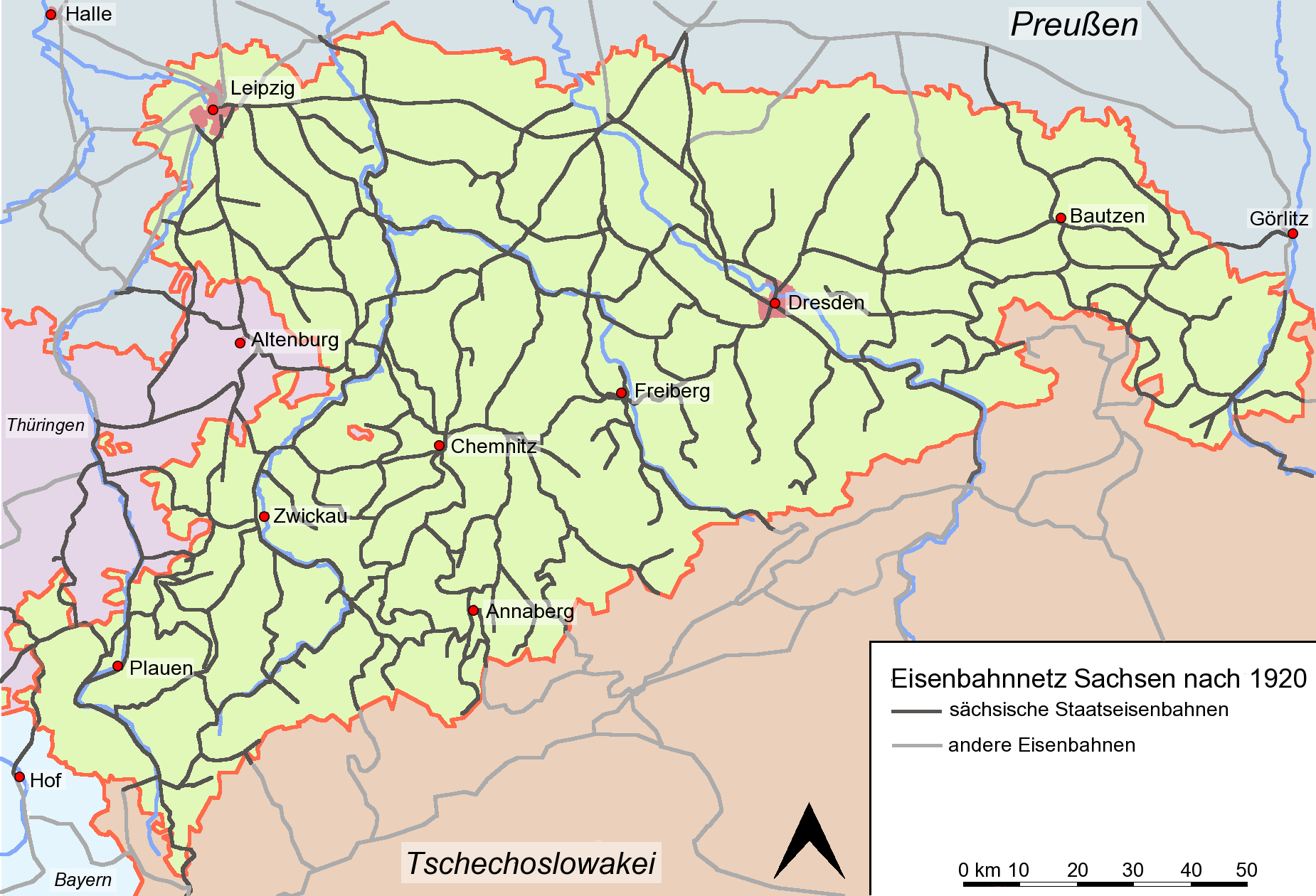
post 1920

== Motive power ==
=== Steam locomotives ===
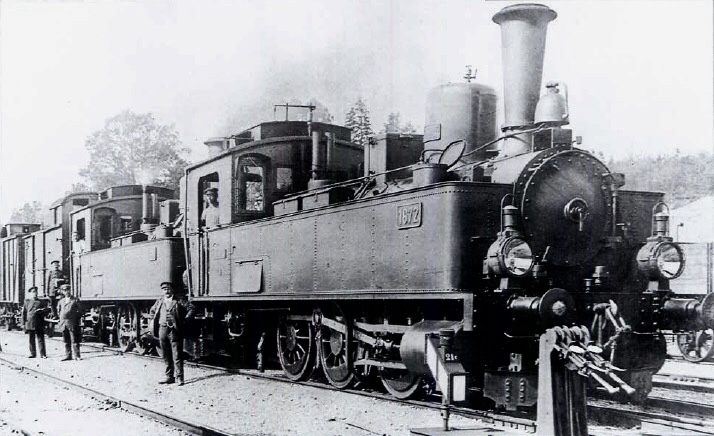
Saxon V T of the third design in double traction before 1925

The first locomotives that were procured were from proven classes built in England. These were four-coupled 0-4-0 steam locomotives and, later, 2-4-0 machines. To begin with even locomotives with a 2-2-2 wheel arrangement were procured.

These classes were deployed on the main lines for a relatively long time; it was not until 1870 that 4-4-0 locomotives (Saxon K II, later K VIII) entered service. On branch lines and in shunting services the four-couplers were the main form of motive power for even longer. From the early 1890s locomotives with six coupled wheels were acquired.

From that time, locomotives began to be matched more closely to their various tasks (goods, passenger and express train duties). Even the different route profiles (flat in the north and northeast, hilly in the south and southwest) led to increasingly different designs. From the turn of the century faster and faster classes were introduced. After the 4-6-0 locomotives followed classes with 4-6-2 (XVIII H) and 2-8-2 (XX HV) arrangements for express train services; 2-6-2 (XIV HT) for local traffic and 2-8-0 (IX H) and E (IX V and XI HT) for goods train duties.

The development of narrow gauge locomotives was not so focussed. After the six-coupler Saxon I K, followed two designs that were unconvincing. Not until 1892 with the introduction of the 0-4-4-0 Meyer locomotive, the Saxon IV K was a design produced that was to form the backbone of the Saxon narrow gauge fleet for decades. With the appearance of the Saxon VI K in 1918 the final successful design was submitted.

Whislst the private Leipzig-Dresden Railway bought its engines from several German locomotive manufacturers, the state locomotives were almost exclusively developed and supplied by the Chemnitz-based Sächsischen Maschinenfabrik locomotive factory.

=== Railcars ===
Railcars were only used in limited numbers on Saxon railways. The only regular and long-lasting use of railcars were the electric units on the Klingenthal–Sachsenberg-Georgenthal narrow gauge line. There were trials with steam railcars, accumulator cars and combustion-engined railbuses. Employed for a long time from 1883 were three Thomas steam railbuses. Two diesel-electrics purchased in 1915 proved themselves well in practice, but were sold to Switzerland after the First World War.

An overview of the individual locomotive classes is given in the List of Saxon locomotives and railbuses.

== Wagons ==
In addition to their own designs, Saxony also used only slightly modified Prussian goods wagon designs. After the foundation of the German State Railway Wagon Association in 1909 the standardised goods wagons were procured, that were defined in 11 goods wagon templates.

== Literature ==
- Arthur von Mayer: Geschichte und Geographie der Deutschen Eisenbahnen., Berlin 1894 (Nachdruck Moers 1984)
- Fritz Näbrich, Günter Meyer, Reiner Preuß: Lokomotiv-Archiv Sachsen, transpress, Berlin 1984
- Erich und Reiner Preuß: Sächsische Staatseisenbahnen., transpress, Berlin 1991, ISBN 3-344-70700-0
- Johann Ferdinand Ulbricht: Geschichte der Königlich Sächsischen Staatseisenbahnen., Leipzig 1889, Reprint Leipzig 1989, ISBN 3-7463-0171-8 (Digitalisat der Ausgabe 1889)
- Manfred Weisbrod: Sachsen-Report Bd. 1 + 2 Sächsische Eisenbahngeschichte., Hermann Merker Verlag, Fürstenfeldbruck 1993+1995, ISBN 3-922404-12-X und ISBN 3-922404-71-5

== See also ==
- Kingdom of Saxony
- List of Saxon locomotives and railbuses
