= Panke =

River in Germany

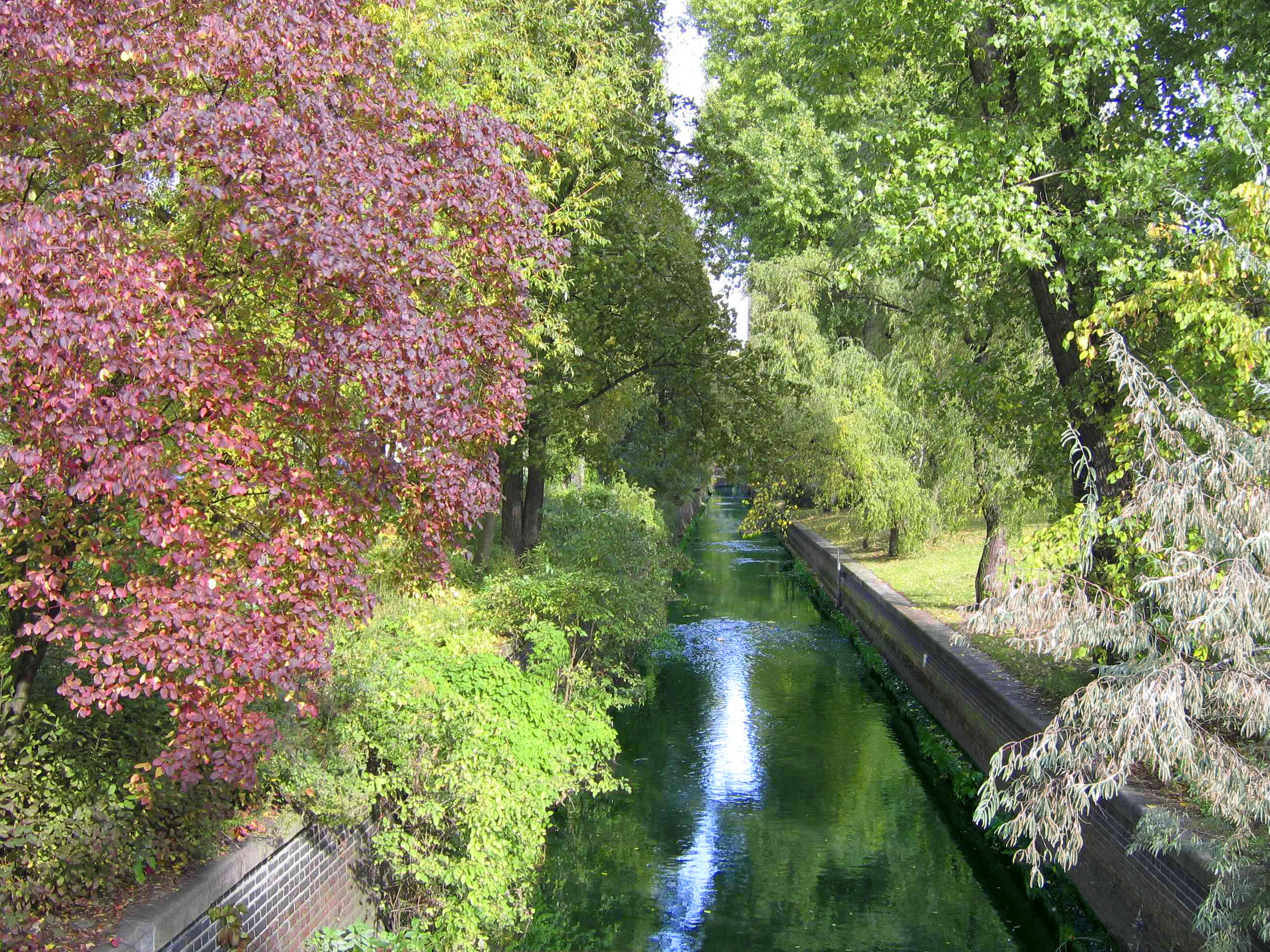
- Canalised Panke River in Berlin-Gesundbrunnen

Location
- Country: Germany

Physical characteristics
- Source
  - location: Bernau bei Berlin
  - elevation: 36 m (118 ft)
- Mouth
  - location: Berlin-Spandau Ship Canal (North Panke)
  - coordinates: 52°32′13″N 13°22′3″E
  - elevation: 33 m (108 ft)
- Length: 29 km (18 mi)
- Basin size: 252 km^{2} (97 sq mi)
- Discharge
  - average: 0.53 m^{3}/s (19 cu ft/s)

Basin features
- Progression: Spree→ Havel→ Elbe→ North Sea
- Tributaries
  - left: Schmöckpfuhlgraben

The Panke (German pronunciation: [ˈpaŋkə]) is a small river in Brandenburg and Berlin, a right tributary of the Spree, originating from the Barnim plateau. It has a length of 29 km, of which 20,2 are within the area of Berlin. Consequently, the Panke is the third longest river in the city after the Spree and the Havel. Several areas in Berlin and Brandenburg are named after the Panke, including Pankow and Panketal.

== Course ==
It is 29 km (18 mi) in length with its source in the northeast of Bernau bei Berlin. The headwaters were overbuilt with the construction of the railway from Berlin to Stettin in 1842, today the Panke waters leak beneath the railroad embankment. The river flows southwestwards parallel to the railway line through the Bernau town centre and reaches the municipal border with Panketal, underpassing the Bundesautobahn 11.

South of Panketal, the river crosses the border of Brandenburg with Berlin, where it traverses the Pankow borough from north to south, running through the locality of Buch, where it underpasses the Bundesautobahn 10 (Berliner Ring) and forms the border with the Berlin locality of Karow and the western border of Karow and Blankenburg with Französisch Buchholz. Joined by the Schmöckpfuhlgraben ditch the Panke runs between the Pankow and Niederschönhausen localities through the gardens of Schönhausen Palace and passes Majakowskiring.

The final stretches of the lower Panke run through Berlin's inner city districts of Gesundbrunnen and Wedding, where it is canalised and partly underground. Pedestrian walkways run alongside the river -or near it- for lengthy stretches. Nowadays it has two mouths, a northern one into the Nordhafen port of the Berlin-Spandau Ship Canal, and another, considerably smaller one directly into the Spree River in Mitte close to the Berliner Ensemble theater. The Mitte section behind the Bundesnachrichtendienst (BND) headquarters (the former site of the Stadion der Weltjugend) is currently renaturated as an urban park component.
