= Pankow (locality) =

- Quarter of Berlin
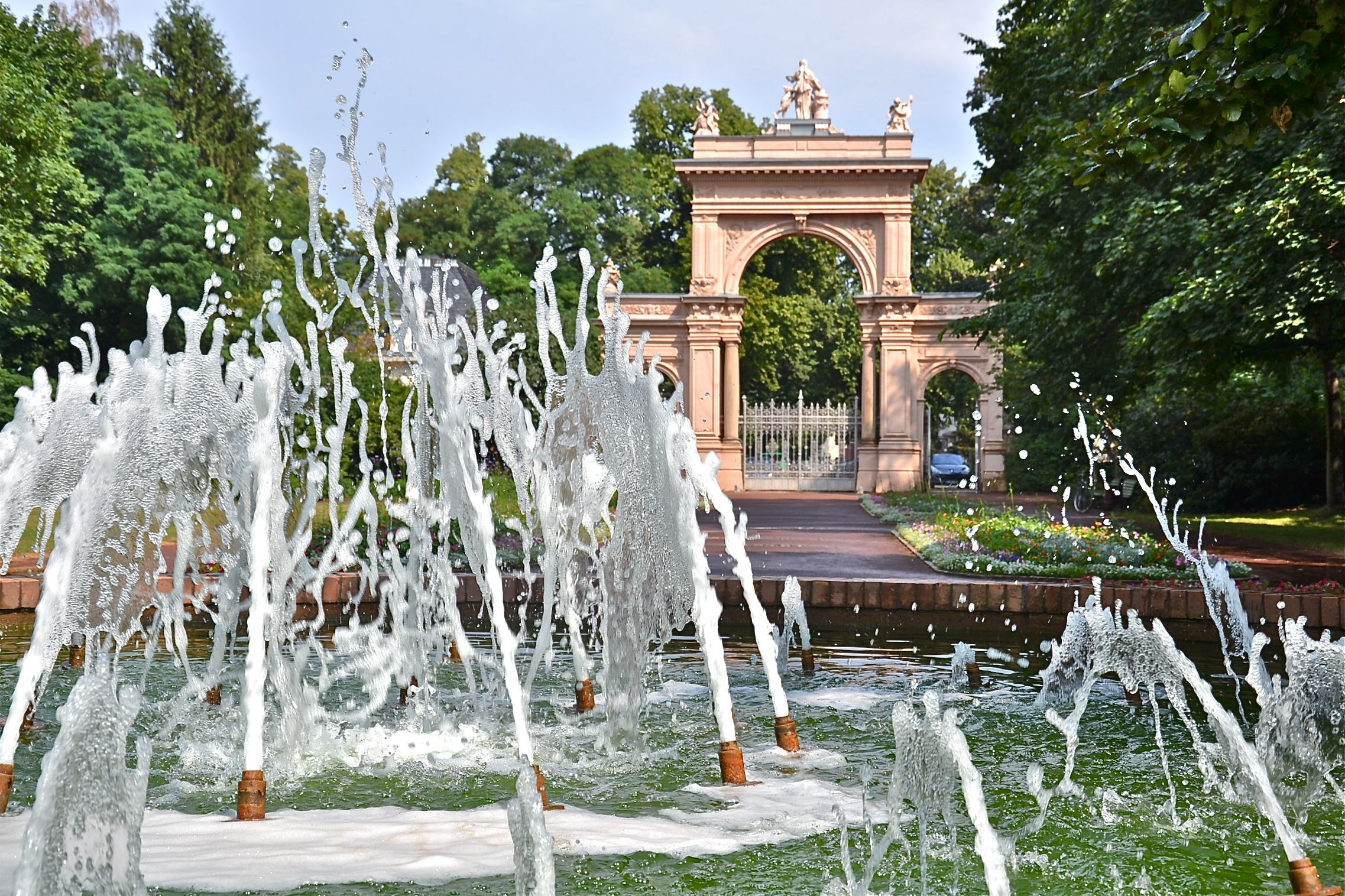
- Bürgerpark in the district

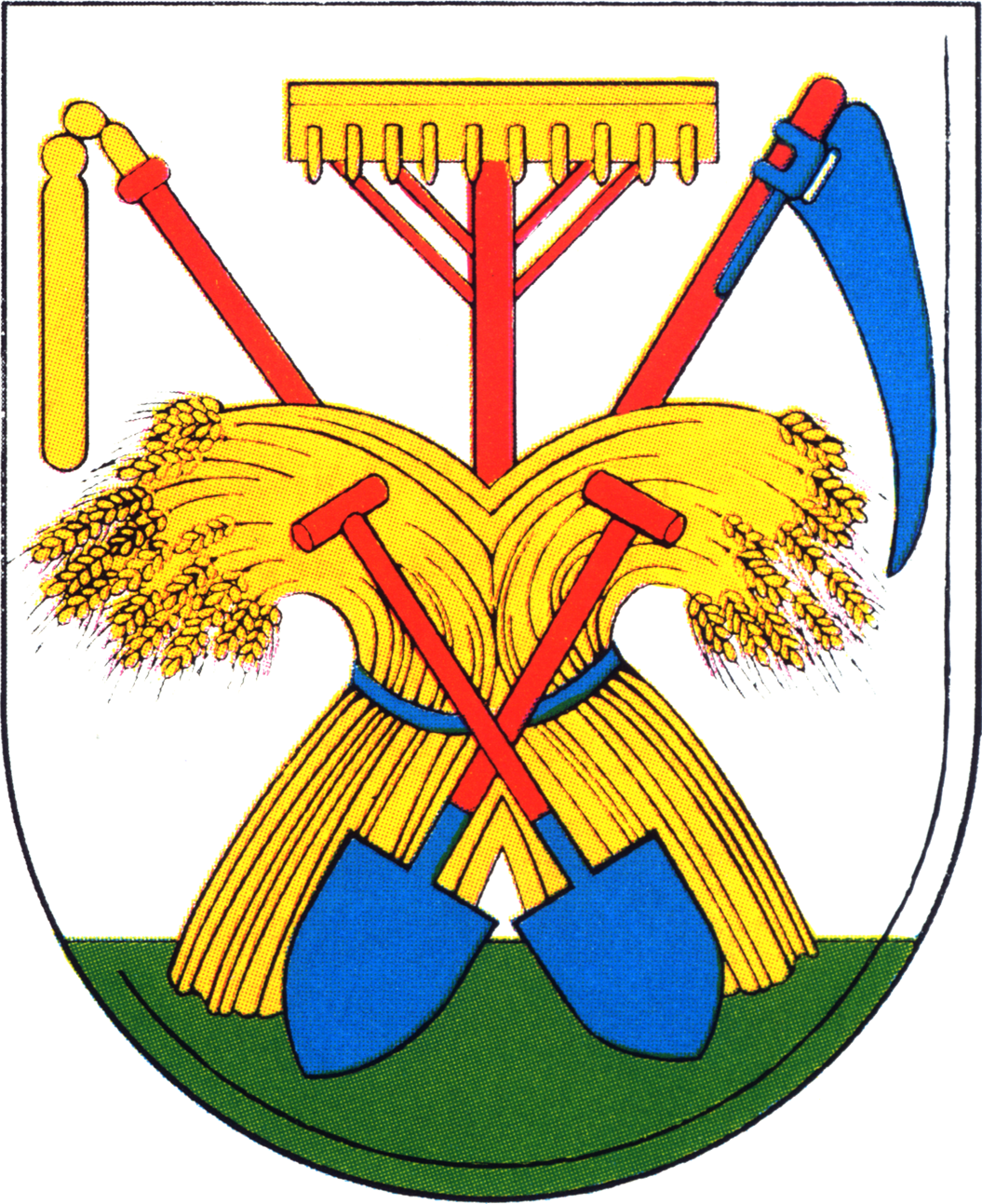
- Flag Coat of arms

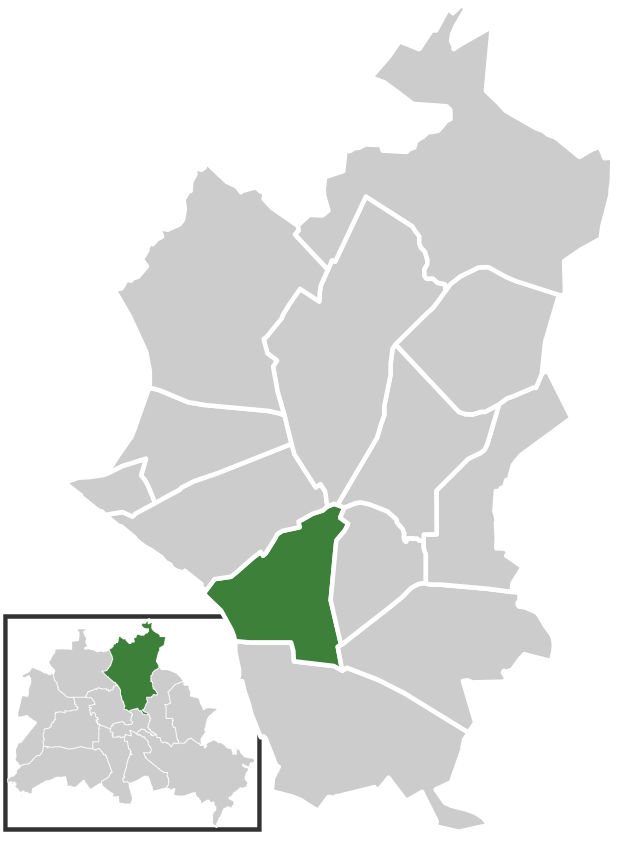
- Location of Pankow in Pankow district and Berlin
- Interactive map of Pankow
- Location within Germany Location within Berlin
- Coordinates: 52°34′09″N 13°24′12″E
- Country: Germany
- State: Berlin
- City: Berlin
- Borough: Pankow
- Founded: 1230

Area
  - Total: 5.66 km^{2} (2.19 sq mi)
- Elevation: 52 m (171 ft)

Population (2024-12-31)
  - Total: 68,684
  - Density: 12,100/km^{2} (31,400/sq mi)
- Time zone: UTC+01:00 (CET)
  - Summer (DST): UTC+02:00 (CEST)
- Postal codes: 13187, 13189
- Website: www.berlin.de/ba-pankow/

Pankow (German: [ˈpaŋkoː]) is a locality (Ortsteil) of Berlin in the district (Bezirk) of Pankow. Until 2001 it was an autonomous district with the localities of Karow, Niederschönhausen, Wilhelmsruh, Rosenthal, Blankenfelde, Buch and Französisch Buchholz.

== History ==
The village of Pankow is named after the small Panke river, a tributary of the Spree. The settlement was first mentioned in a 1311 deed by the Margraves of Brandenburg, though the "Four Evangelists" fieldstone church had already been erected about 1230. In 1691 Elector Frederick III acquired Schönhausen Palace, in neighboring Niederschönhausen, from the heirs of General Joachim Ernst von Grumbkow, which promoted the development of the Pankow village.

As Pankow grew, due to industrialization, in the 19th century, it became a suburb – and popular day-trip destination – of Berlin. It was finally incorporated into the city by the Greater Berlin Act of 1920.

In the East German period, from 1949 to 1990, Pankow, together with Niederschönhausen, was a prominent quarter of East Berlin. From 1949 to 1960 Schönhausen Palace was the presidential residency of East Germany, and throughout the period many embassies were located in the vicinity.

== Geography ==
Pankow is situated in the south-western side of its district. It borders the localities of Niederschönhausen, Französisch Buchholz, Karow, Heinersdorf, Weissensee, Prenzlauer Berg and Gesundbrunnen. Between 1961 and 1990, the Berlin Wall passed through Pankow (in East Berlin) and Gesundbrunnen (in West Berlin).

== Transportation ==
The locality is served by the Berliner S-Bahn lines S1, S2, S25, S85; by the U-Bahn line U2, and by several lines of tramway.

== Photogallery ==
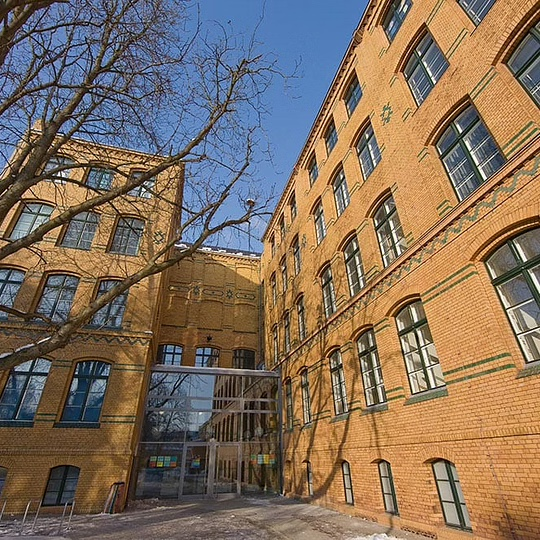
school behind the town hall

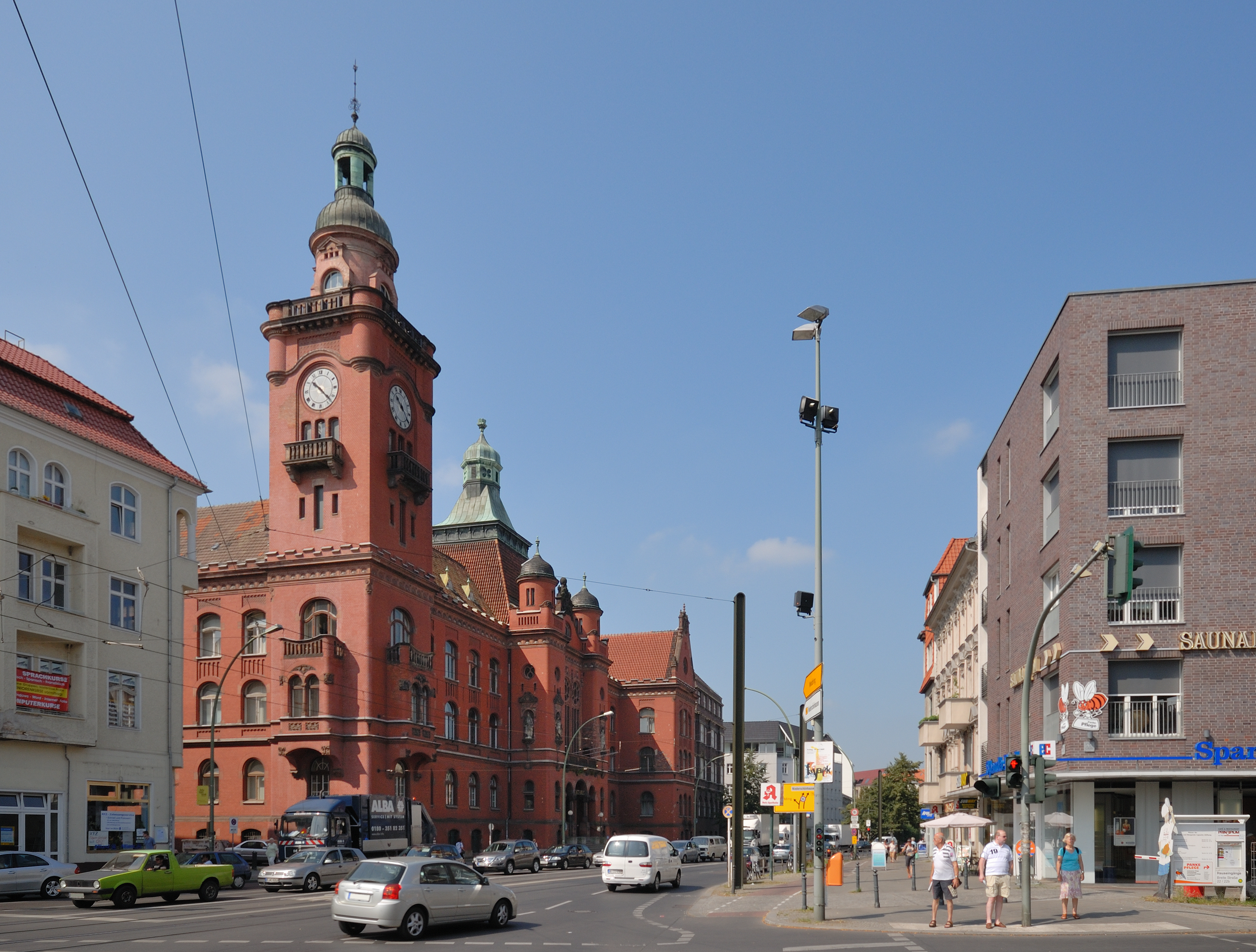
town hall

== See also ==
- Schönhausen Palace
- Berlin-Pankow railway station
