= Blankenburg (Berlin) =

- Quarter of Berlin
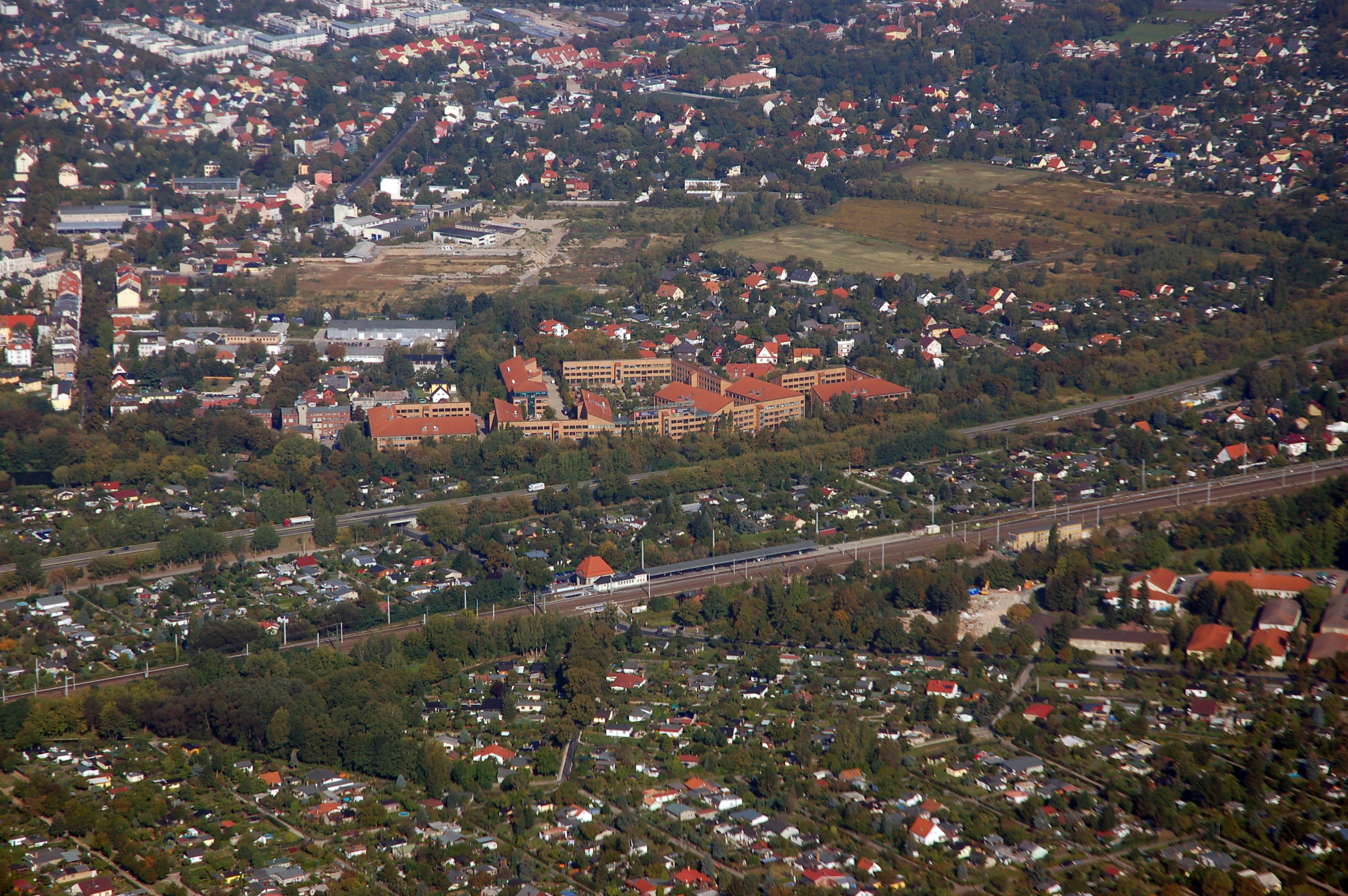
- Aerial view with Französisch Buchholz (in north)

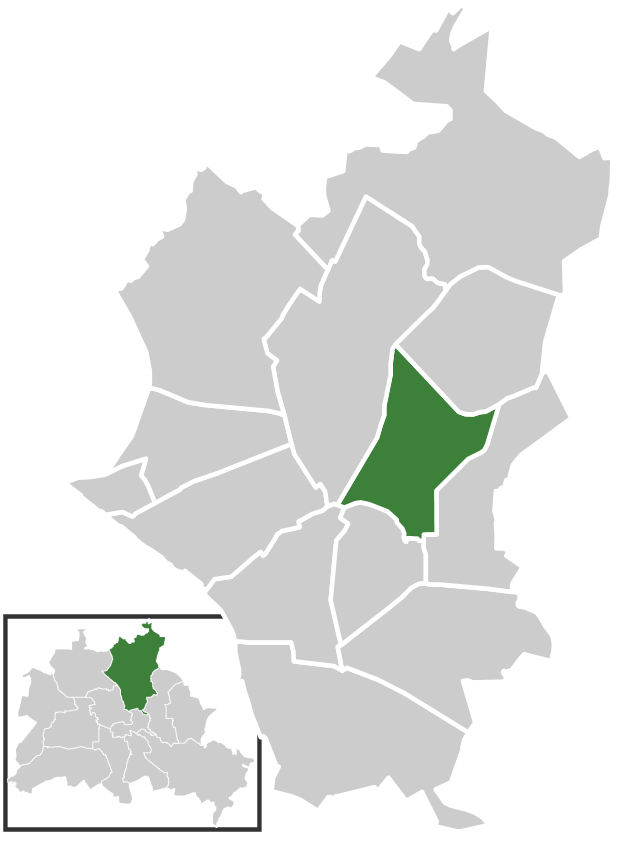
- Location of Blankenburg in Pankow district and Berlin
- Interactive map of Blankenburg
- Location within Germany Location within Berlin
- Coordinates: 52°36′00″N 13°27′00″E
- Country: Germany
- State: Berlin
- City: Berlin
- Borough: Pankow
- Founded: 1375

Area
  - Total: 6.03 km^{2} (2.33 sq mi)
- Elevation: 52 m (171 ft)

Population (2024-12-31)
  - Total: 6,921
  - Density: 1,150/km^{2} (2,970/sq mi)
- Time zone: UTC+01:00 (CET)
  - Summer (DST): UTC+02:00 (CEST)
- Postal codes: 13129
- Vehicle registration: B
- Website: Official website

Blankenburg (German pronunciation: [ˈblaŋkn̩bʊʁk]) is a German locality (Ortsteil) within the borough (Bezirk) of Pankow, Berlin. Until 2001 it was part of the former borough of Weißensee.

== History ==
The locality, first mentioned in 1375, was an autonomous municipality of the former Niederbarnim district, merged into Berlin in 1920 with the "Greater Berlin Act".

== Geography ==
Blankenburg is located in the north-eastern suburb of Berlin and borders with the localities of Französisch Buchholz, Karow, Stadtrandsiedlung Malchow, Heinersdorf and, in a brief point, Pankow.

== Transport ==
The locality is served by the Berlin S-Bahn lines S2, S8 and S9, at Blankenburg station, and by bus lines 150, 154 and 158. Blankenburger boundary with Französisch Buchholz is crossed by the motorway A114 and the nearest exit serving the locality is the n.4 ("Pasewalker Straße").

== Personalities ==
- Johannes Maus (1916–1985), actor

== Photogallery ==
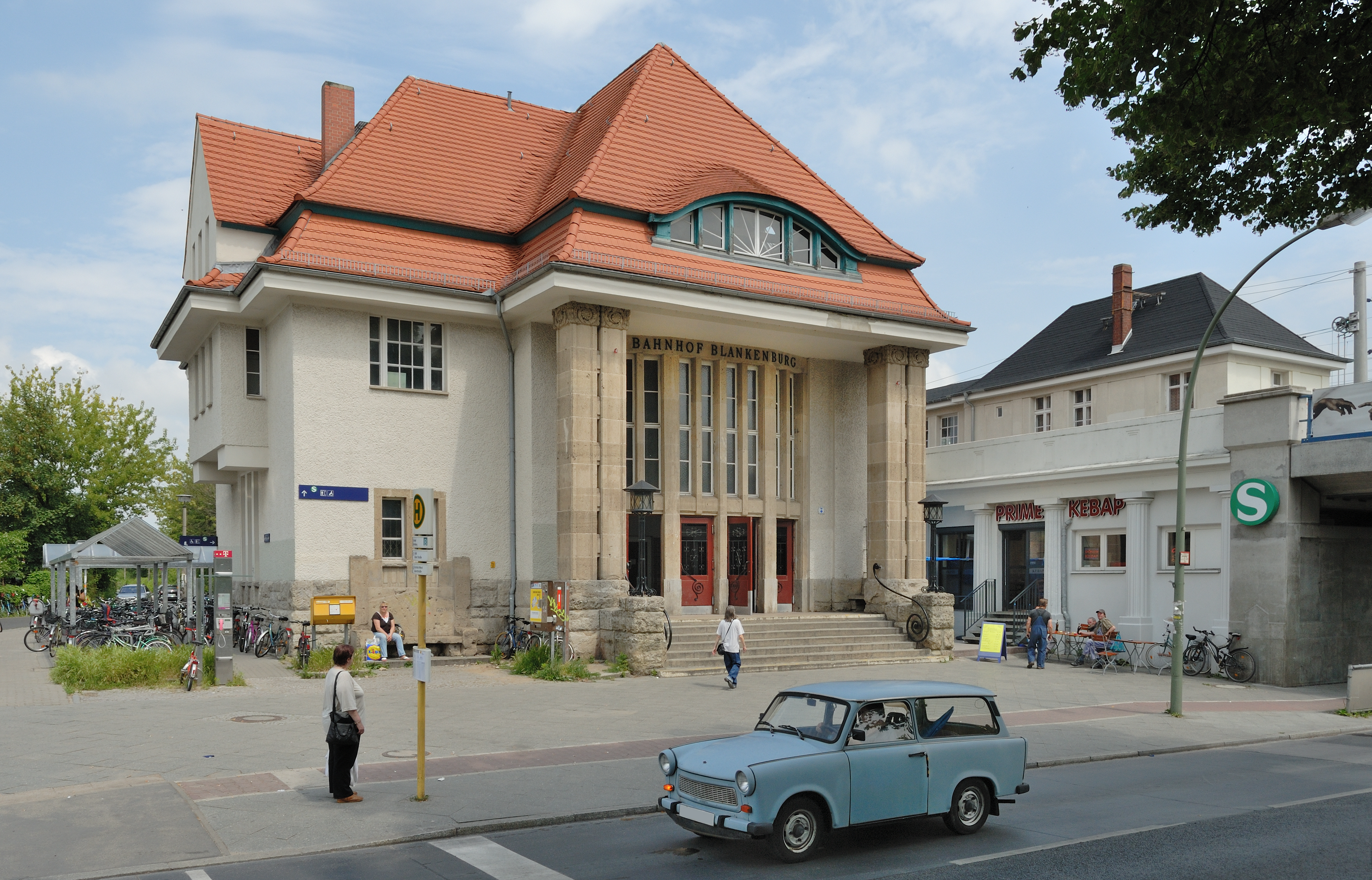
Railway station

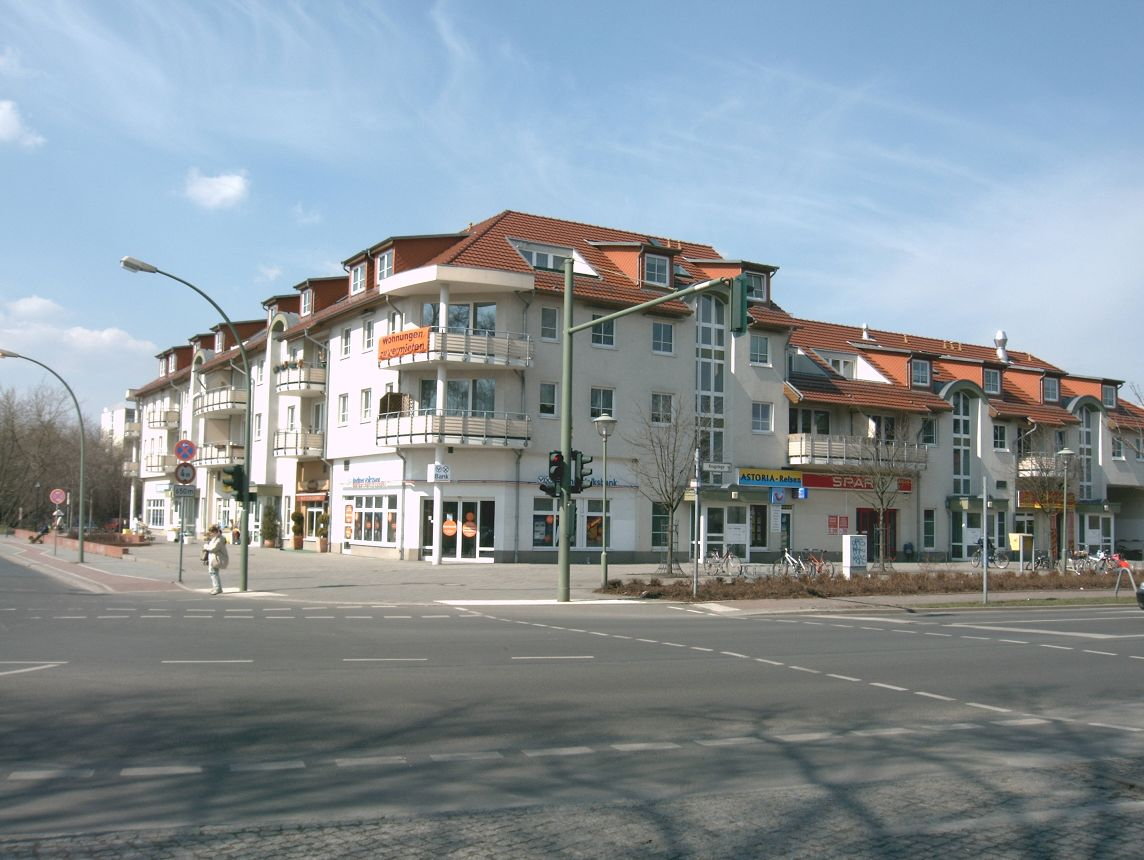
Centre of the locality

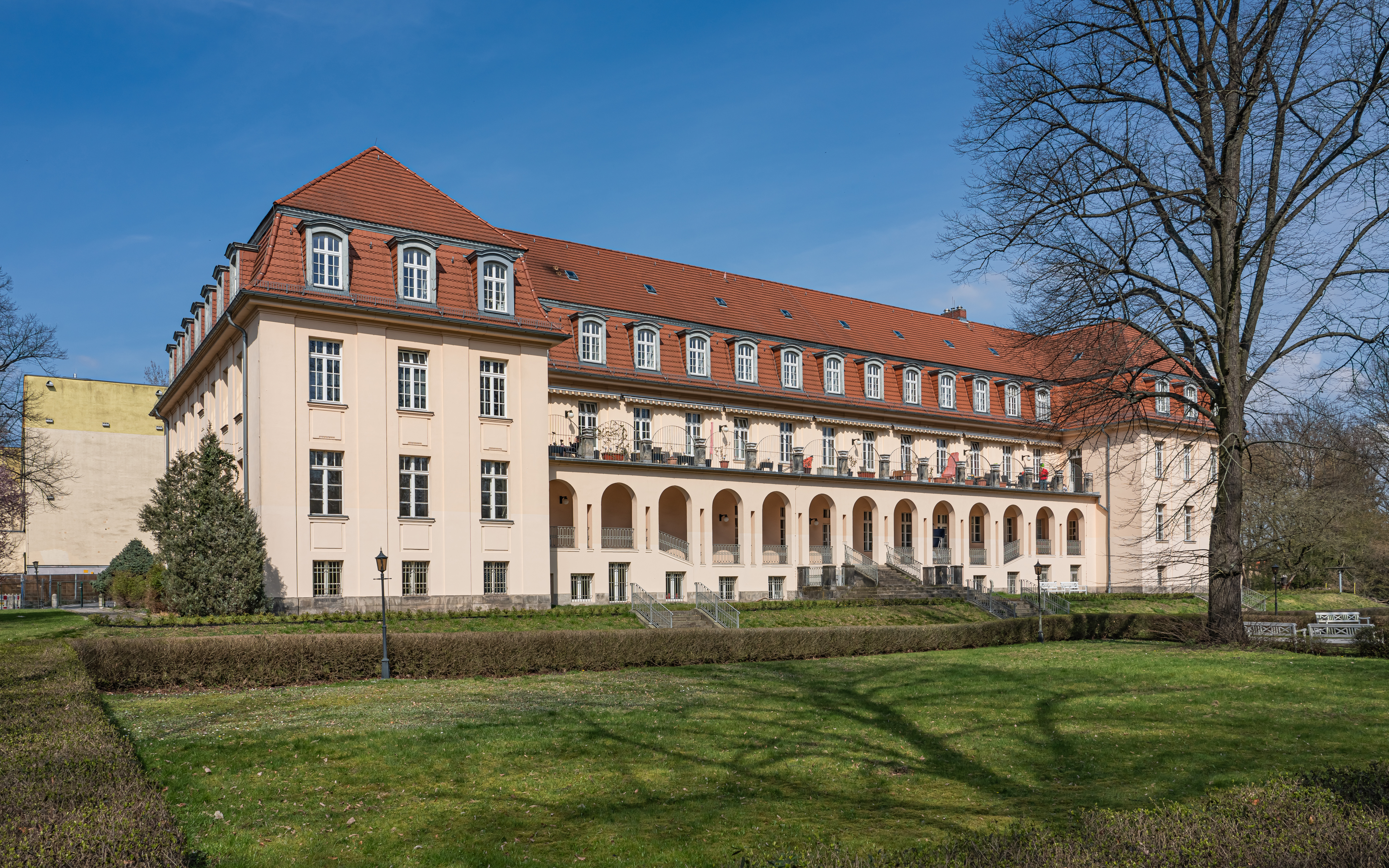
Rehabilitation center "Janus Korczak"
