= Buch (Berlin) =

- Quarter of Berlin
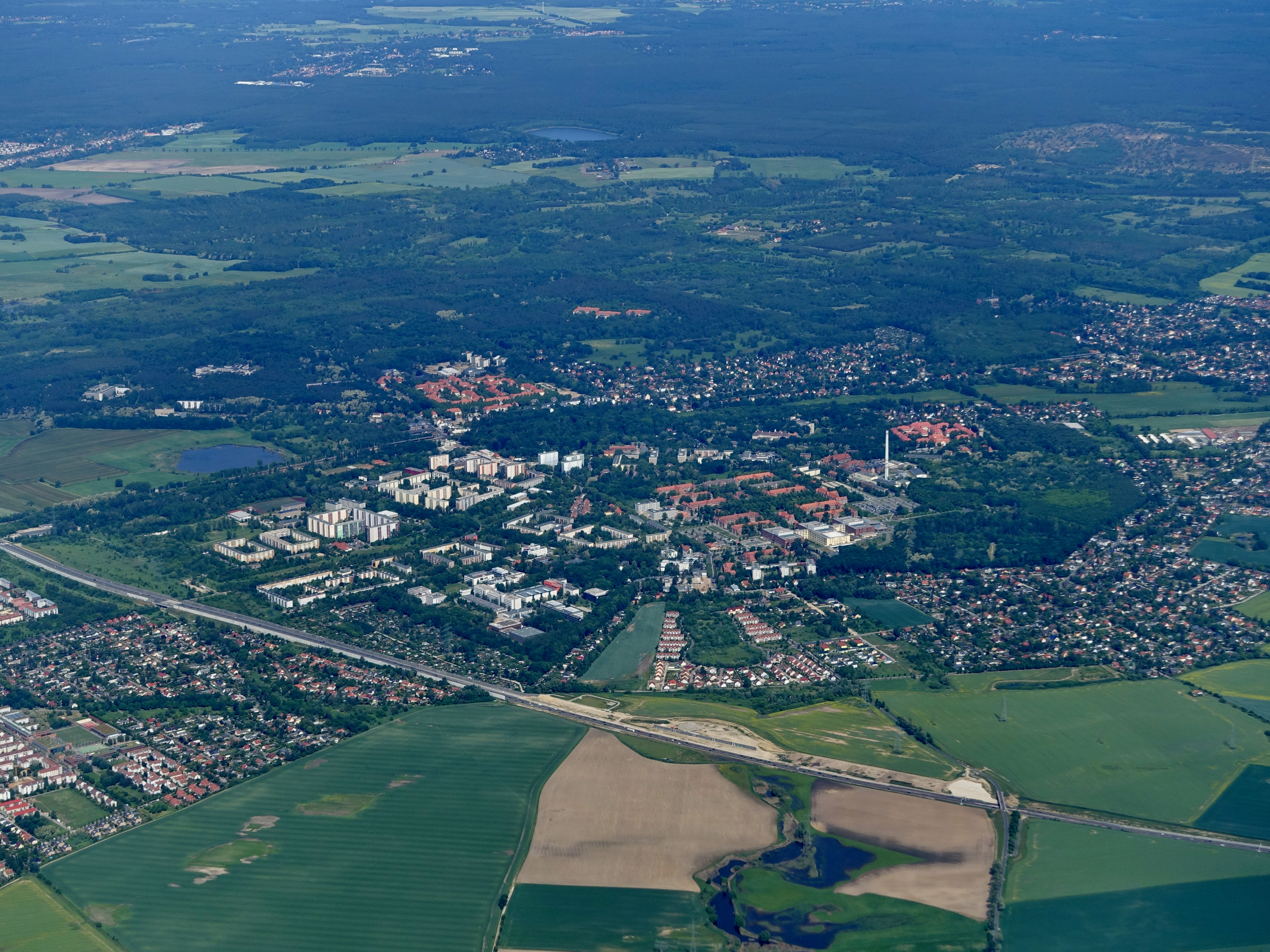
- Berlin Buch from above

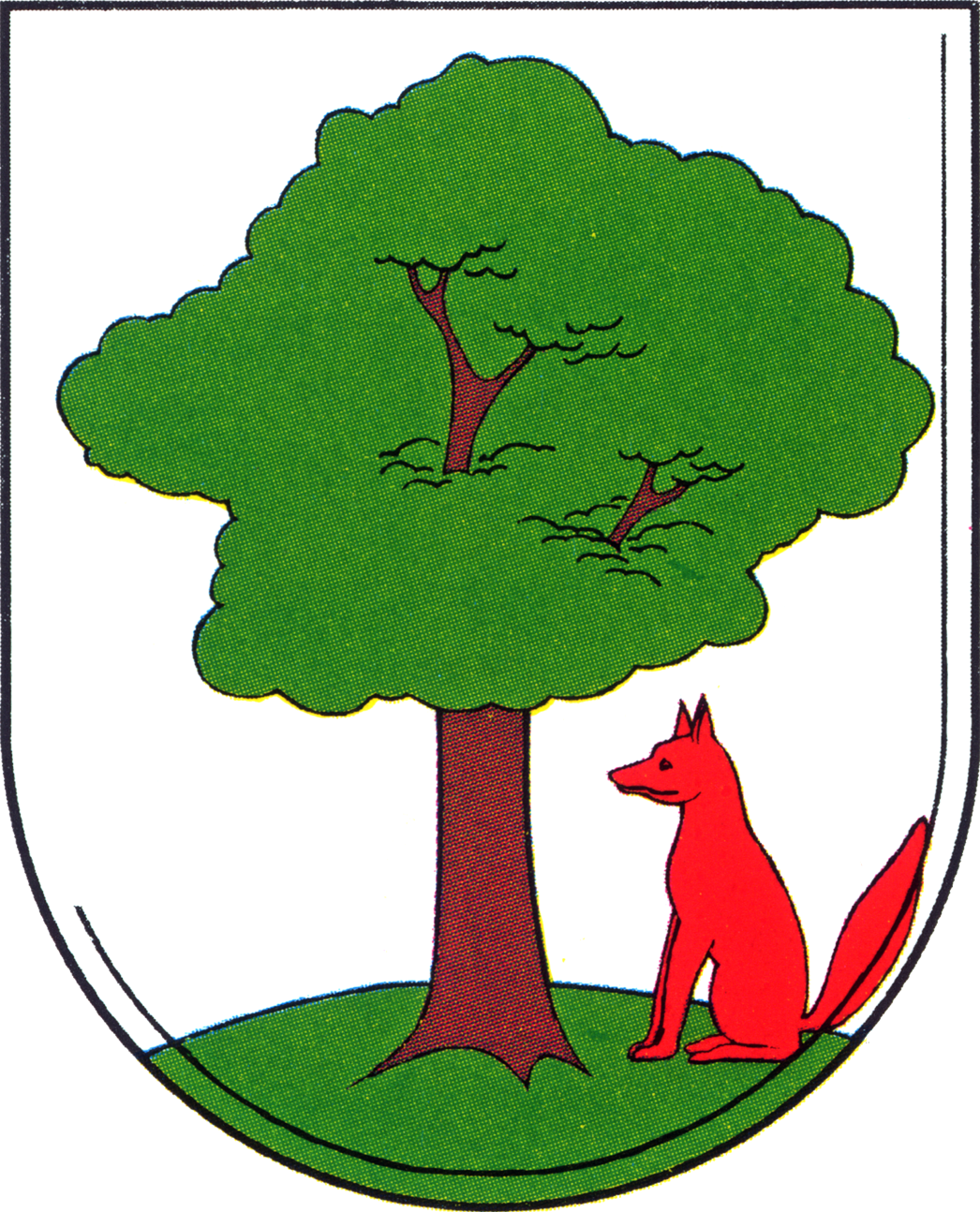
- Coat of arms

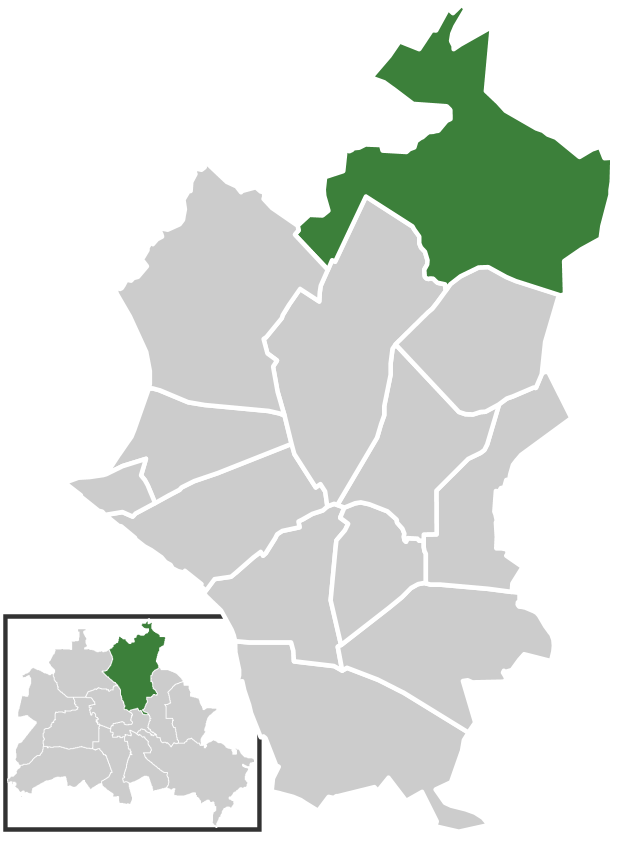
- Location of Buch in Pankow and Berlin
- Interactive map of Buch
- Location within Germany Location within Berlin
- Coordinates: 52°38′01″N 13°29′57″E
- Country: Germany
- State: Berlin
- City: Berlin
- Borough: Pankow
- Founded: 1342

Area
  - Total: 18.2 km^{2} (7.0 sq mi)
- Elevation: 90 m (300 ft)

Population (2024-12-31)
  - Total: 17,451
  - Density: 959/km^{2} (2,480/sq mi)
- Time zone: UTC+01:00 (CET)
  - Summer (DST): UTC+02:00 (CEST)
- Postal codes: 13125
- Vehicle registration: B
- Website: Official website

Buch (German: [buːx]) is a German locality (Ortsteil) within the Berlin borough (Bezirk) of Pankow. Situated on the Panke river, it is the city's northernmost quarter, chiefly known for its historic village centre and extended hospital premises.

== Geography ==
The settlement area is located on the Barnim Plateau stretching in the northeast of the Berlin city centre up to the Oder–Havel Canal and the Oderbruch delta. Berlin's northernmost point is at the Rieselfelder meadows, a former sewage farm transformed into a rural area, part of the Buch Forest within the Barnim Nature Park. The landscape is marked by hill chains, sandurs and small lakes such as the Bogensee.

Along its border with the state of Brandenburg, Buch is surrounded by the municipalities of Wandlitz and Panketal (with the civil parishes of Zepernick, Röntgental and Neu Buch), both in the district of Barnim. The Berlin localities bordering with Buch in the south are Blankenfelde, Französisch Buchholz and Karow. In Karow, a neighbourhood exists which is named Stadtrandsiedlung Buch.

The quarter is centred around Berlin-Buch station on the Berlin–Szczecin railway line and the adjacent historic village centre in the east. An extended Plattenbau housing area stretches along the railway in the south; around the centre, several large hospital and sanatorium areas were laid out in the early 19th century, built according to plans designed by Ludwig Hoffmann, with retirement homes, psychiatric institutions, and a cemetery. Many of the premises have been converted to residential areas.

== History ==
The Barnim Plateau was already settled in the Mesolithic era. The village of Wendeschen Buk ("Wendish", i.e. "Slavic Buch") was first mentioned in a 1342 deed; it is also documented as Buch slavica in the 1375 register of Emperor Chales IV. Probably founded by Sprevane tribes, Buch gradually became a German village during the Ostsiedlung migration, instigated by the Ascanian margraves John I and Otto III of Brandenburg from the early 13th century onwards. The linear settlement around the village church and Buch manor, parallel to the Panke river with a watermill. The Slavic affix fell into disuse during the 16th century.

Devastated during the Thirty Years' War, the Buch area was quickly redeveloped under the rule of the "Great Elector" Frederick William. The manor became am aristocratic estate, which about 1700 was inherited by the later adventurer and writer Baron Karl Ludwig von Pöllnitz (1692–1775). In the 18th century, the manor house and the church were rebuilt in a Baroque style. In the Seven Years' War, the premises were plundered by Russian troops under General Gottlieb Heinrich Totleben during his Raid on Berlin in 1760. After the war, King Frederick the Great promoted sericulture for a recovery of the local economy. Then held by the Voss noble family, the fate of Julie von Voss (1766–1789), lady-in-waiting and spouse of King Frederick William II of Prussia, was perpetuated in the Wanderungen durch die Mark Brandenburg by Theodor Fontane.

In 1815 Buch was incorporated into the newly established Prussian Province of Brandenburg. The station on the Berlin–Stettin railway line was inaugurated on 26 June 1879. The manor estates were purchased from the Voss family by the City of Berlin in 1898, in order to lay out the Rieselfelder sewage area according to plans by James Hobrecht. At the same time, it became the site of several municipal hospitals designed by Ludwig Hoffmann and Martin Wagner.

Buch remained a Brandenburg municipality until 1920, when it merged into Berlin with the "Greater Berlin Act". The hospital area from 1928 hosted the Kaiser Wilhelm Institute for Brain Research led by neurologists Oskar Vogt, Cécile Vogt-Mugnier and biologist Nikolay Timofeev-Ressovsky; from 1931 it had its seat in a newly erected building designed by Carl Sattler. During the Nazi era, headed by Hugo Spatz and Julius Hallervorden from 1937/38, it played a vital role in eugenics and racist research, and also in the Aktion T4 "euthanasia" program.

From 1949 to 1990 Buch was part of East Berlin.

== Transport ==
The locality is served by the urban rail line S2, part of the S-Bahn, at the station of Buch. It is also traversed, at its southern borders, by the Berliner beltway (A10, known as "Berliner Ring"). Buch is the only Berlin quarter located outside the Berliner Ring. Nearest exit to Buch is the n.36, "Berlin-Weißensee".

== Photogallery ==
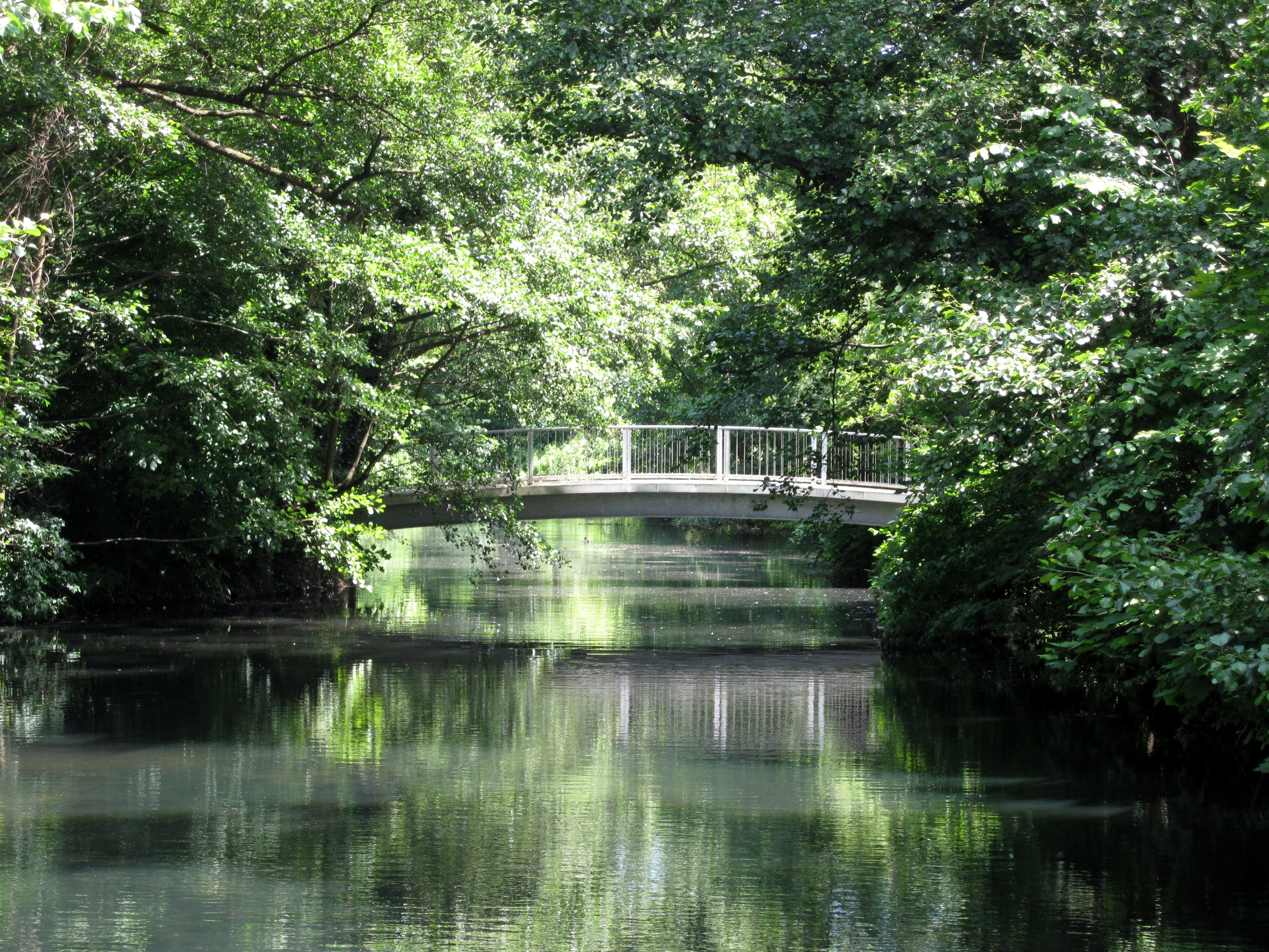
Panke river at the Schlosspark Buch

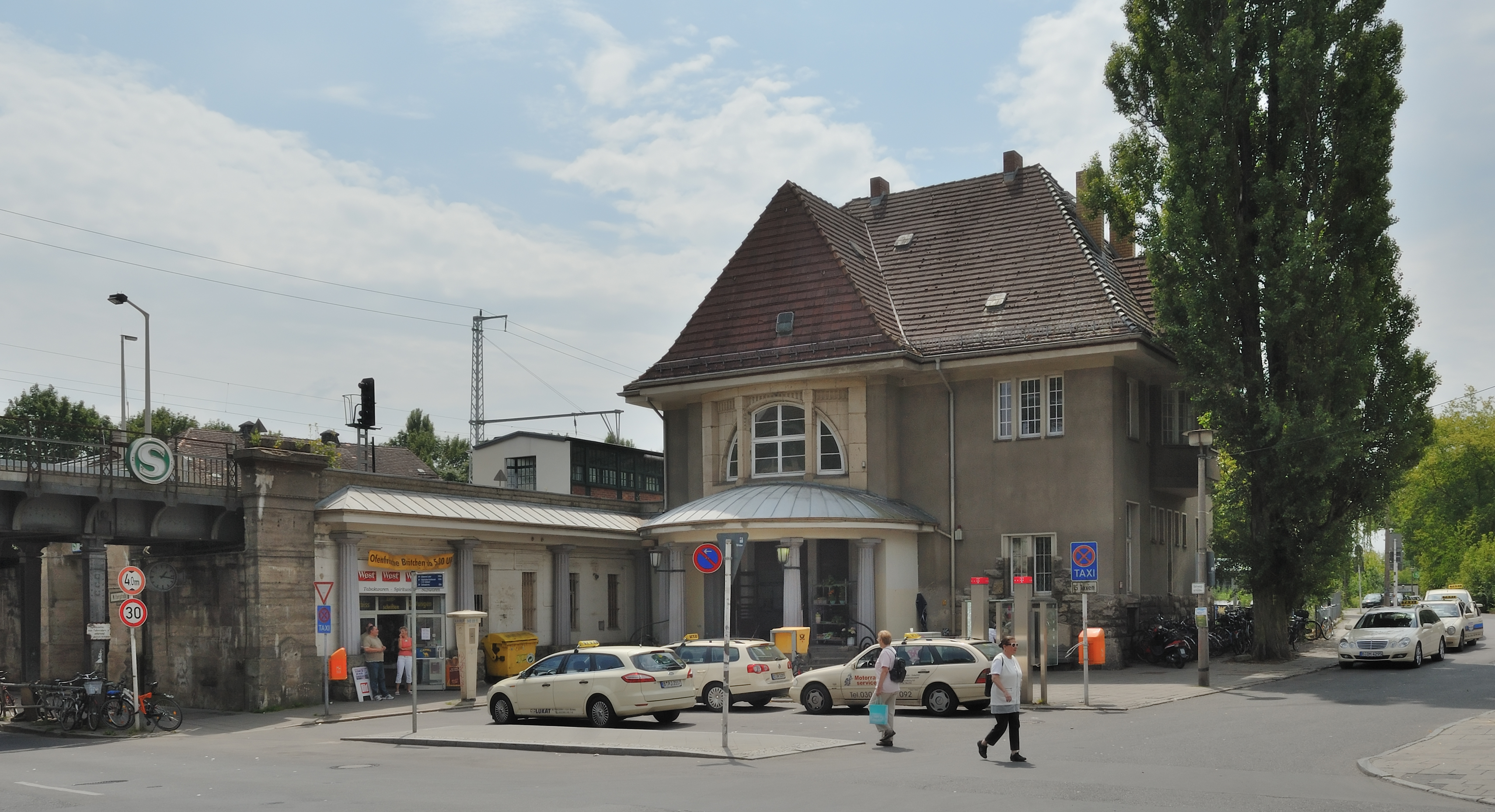
Berlin-Buch train station

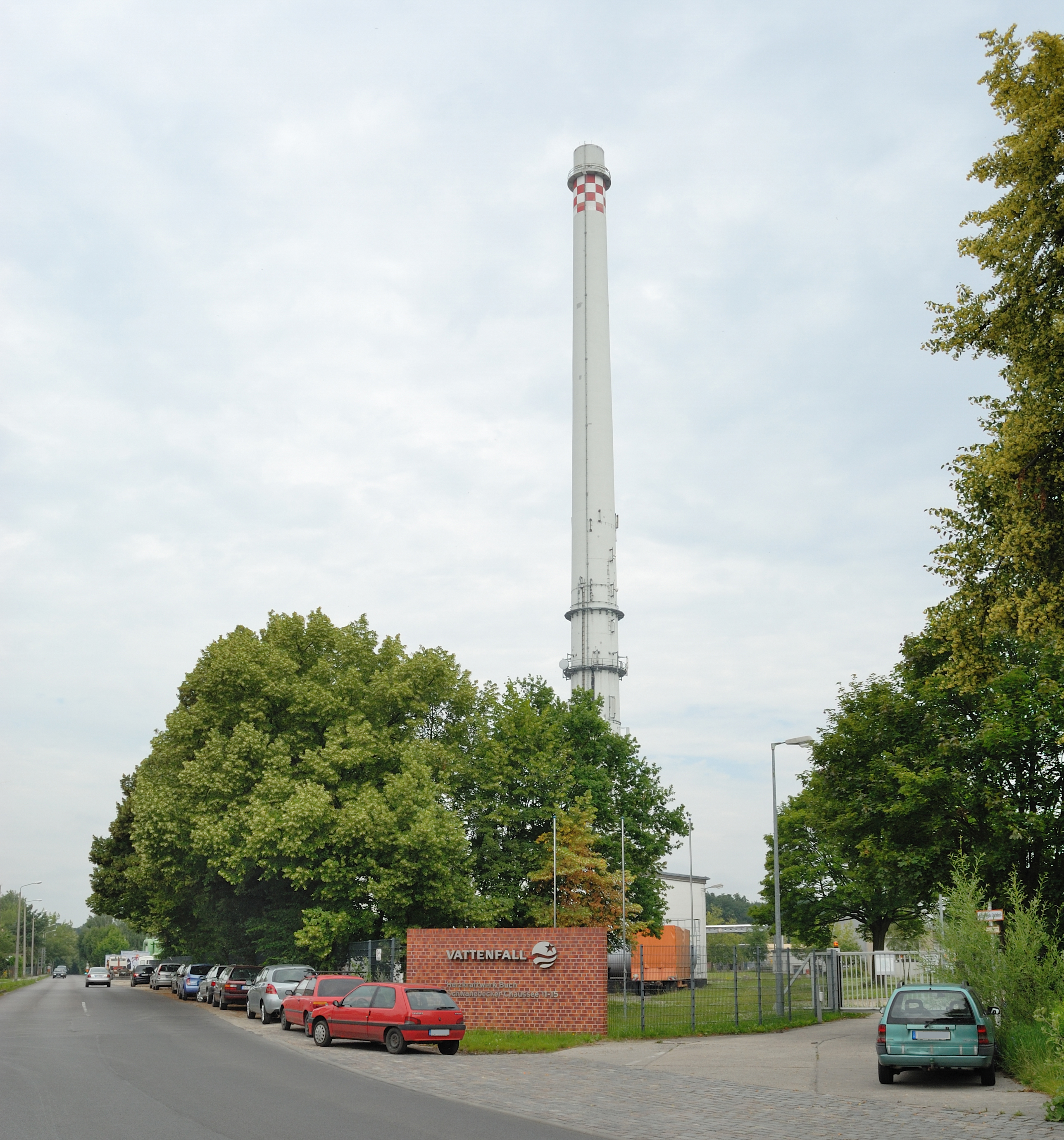
Combined heat and power plant Berlin-Buch.

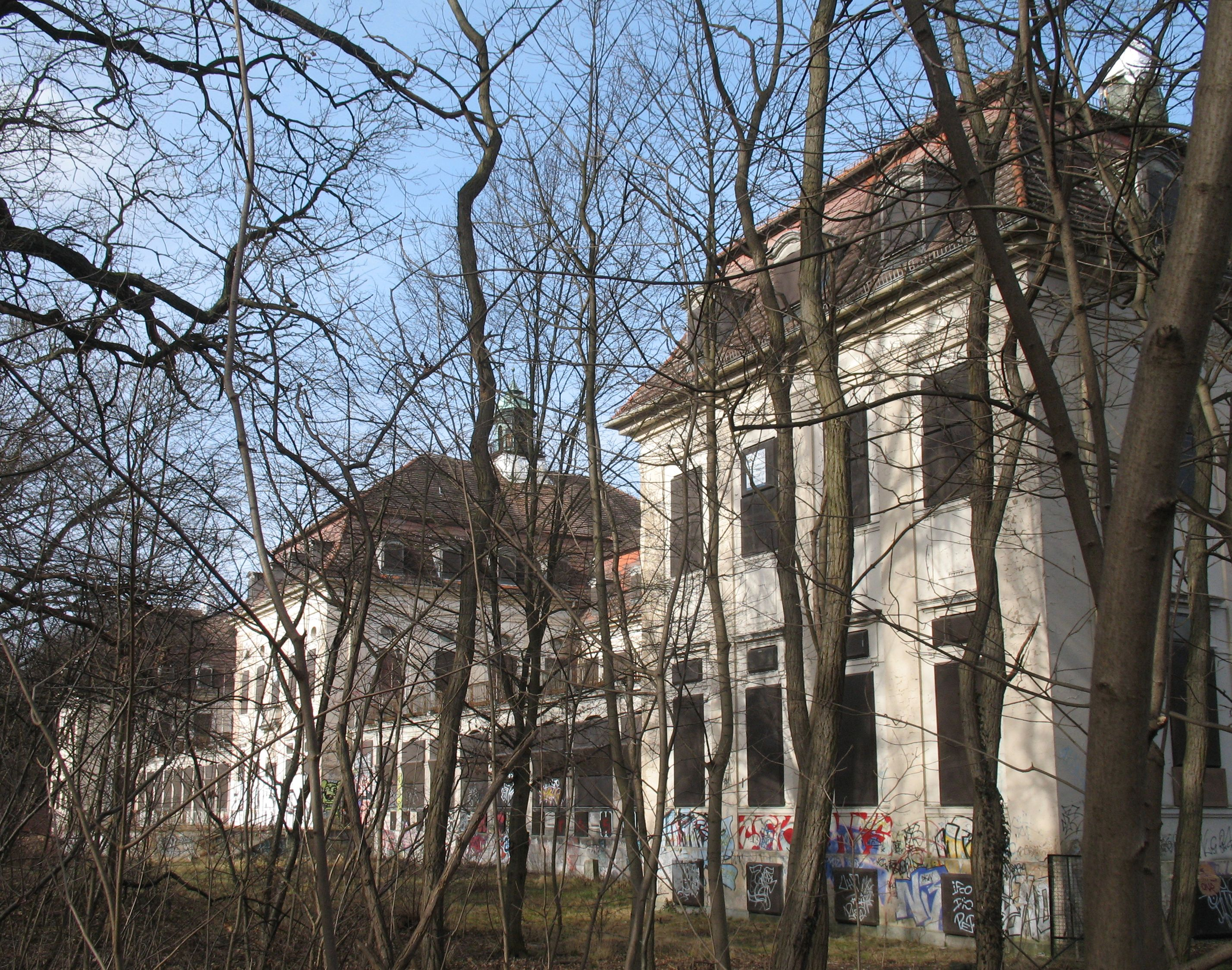
Former sanatorium

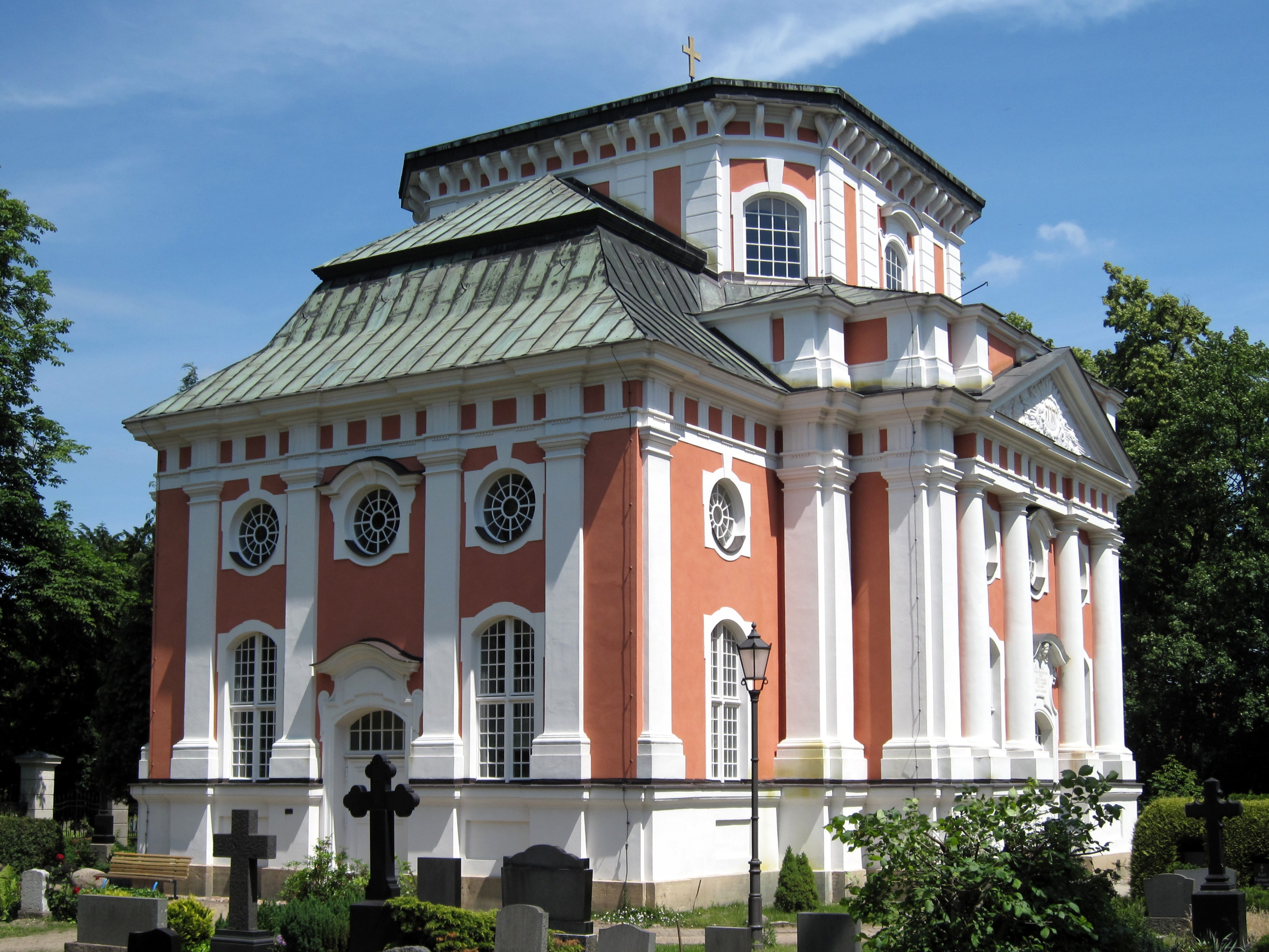
Schlosskirche

== Literature ==
- Martin Eckart Pfannschmidt: "Geschichte der Berliner Vororte Buch und Karow", Berlin 1927
