= Weißer See (Berlin) =

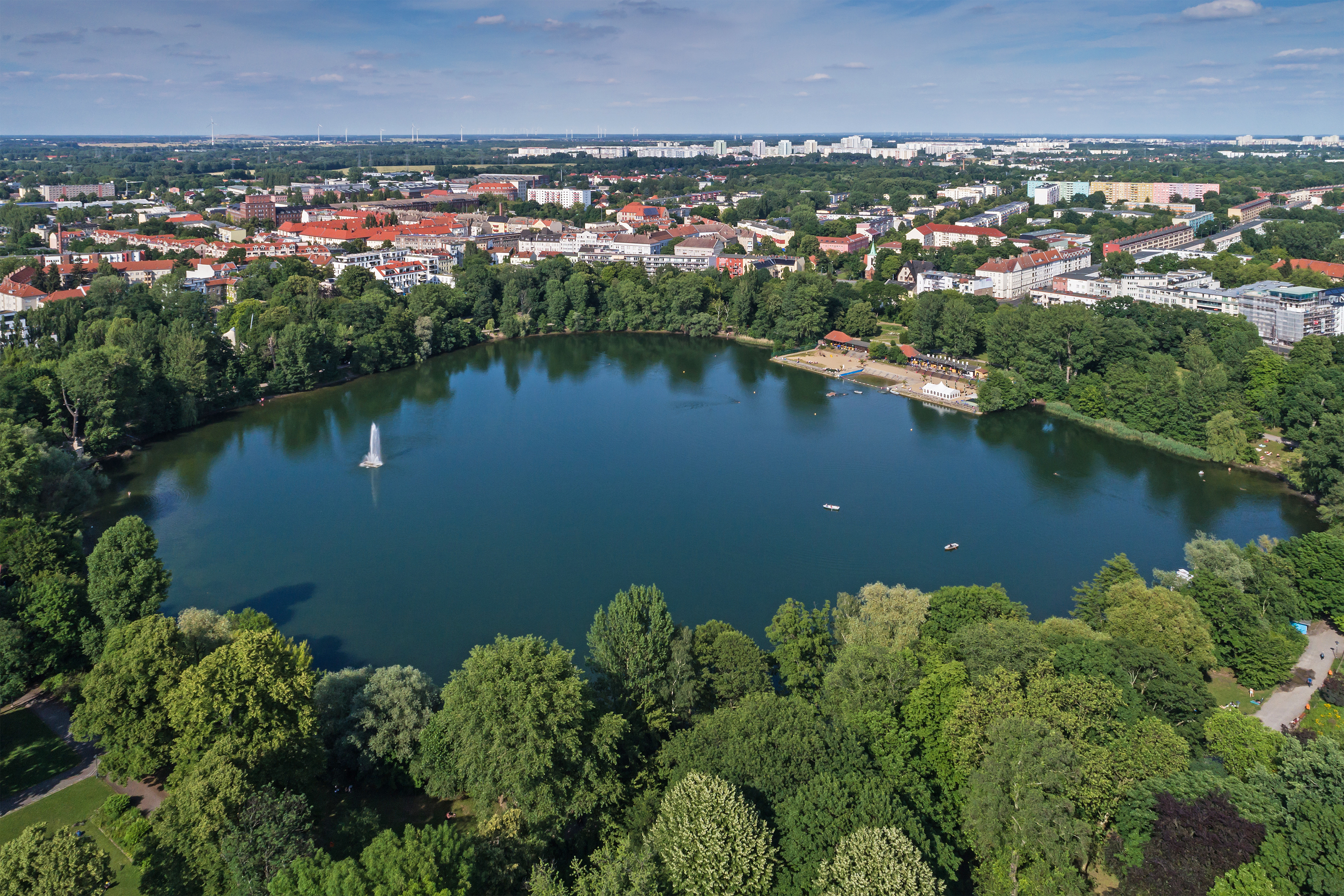
- June 2017 aerial photograph of Weißer See

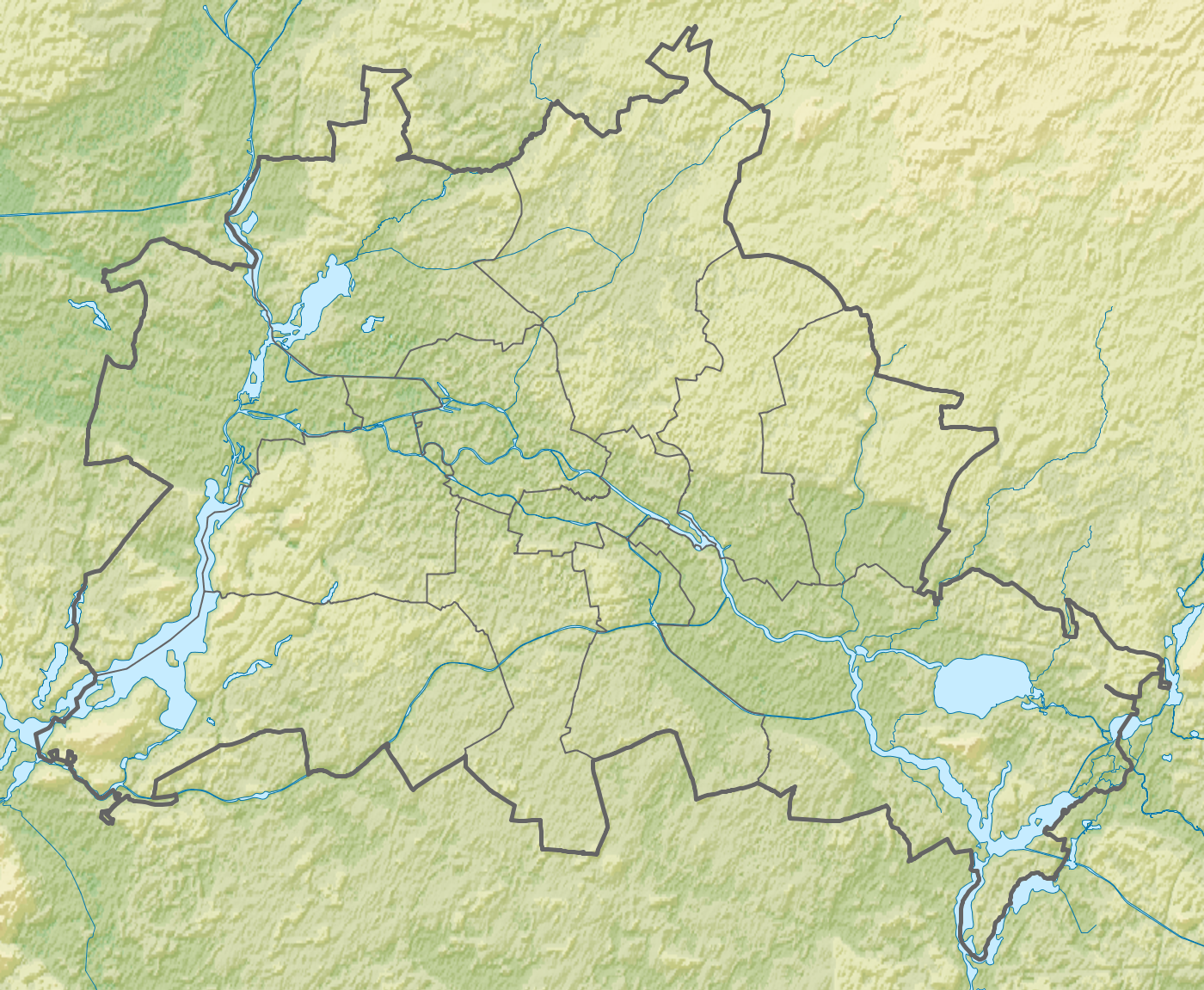
- Location within Berlin
- Location: Weissensee, Berlin
- Coordinates: 52°33′15″N 13°27′50.5″E
- Basin countries: Germany
- Surface area: 8.3011 ha (20.512 acres)
- Average depth: 4.34 m (14.2 ft)
- Max. depth: 10.64 m (34.9 ft)
- Water volume: 360,606 m^{3} (12,734,700 cu ft)
- Shore length^{1}: 1.175 km (0.730 mi)
- Settlements: Berlin-Weißensee
- ^{1} Shore length is not a well-defined measure.

Weißer See (German pronunciation: [ˈvaɪsɐ ˈzeː]; literally "White Lake") is a lake in the Weissensee district of Berlin, Germany. Its surface area is 8.3011ha (84,000m^{2}) and volume 360,606m^{3}. With a depth of 10.64m (average depth 4.34m) it is one of the deepest areas of water in Berlin. Its dimensions are approx. 300m East-West by 350m North-South.

The lake and its surrounding landscape were shaped by the Weichsel ice age. It is embedded in the ground moraines of the lower Barnim Plateau. During the melting of the ice a huge block of ice remained; when it subsequently thawed it created what is known as a kettle hole. This was the origin of today's Weisser See. Over the centuries settlements developed around the lake, mainly based on agriculture; the oldest known settlement dates from the 13th century.

During the past 150 years, through development of the near shore, the water balance and catchment area have been increasingly disturbed.

As a reminder of the cultural heritage of the Sterneckerschen establishment (Weissensee Castle), there still exists the Strandbad Weissensee (Weissensee bathing beach), dating from 1912. In addition to its role as a bathing and recreation area, the Weisser See also functions as an overflow lake for the Weissensee storm sewers. The water level in the lake is regulated by the Berlin water company and measured at the bathing place. During times of low rainfall water from nearby sources can be pumped into the lake underneath the observation deck. Since the expense of the pumping is met by the surrounding district of Pankow, this additional water supply is limited by financial considerations. Notable in the Weisser See is a centre fountain of considerable height, which with the help of the Young Pioneers Diving Club is put into operation each year.

The Weissensee Park surrounds the lake. On the banks of the lake there is a boat rental station and the historic Milchhäuschen (little milk house), a café that was well known in GDR days.

== Image Gallery ==
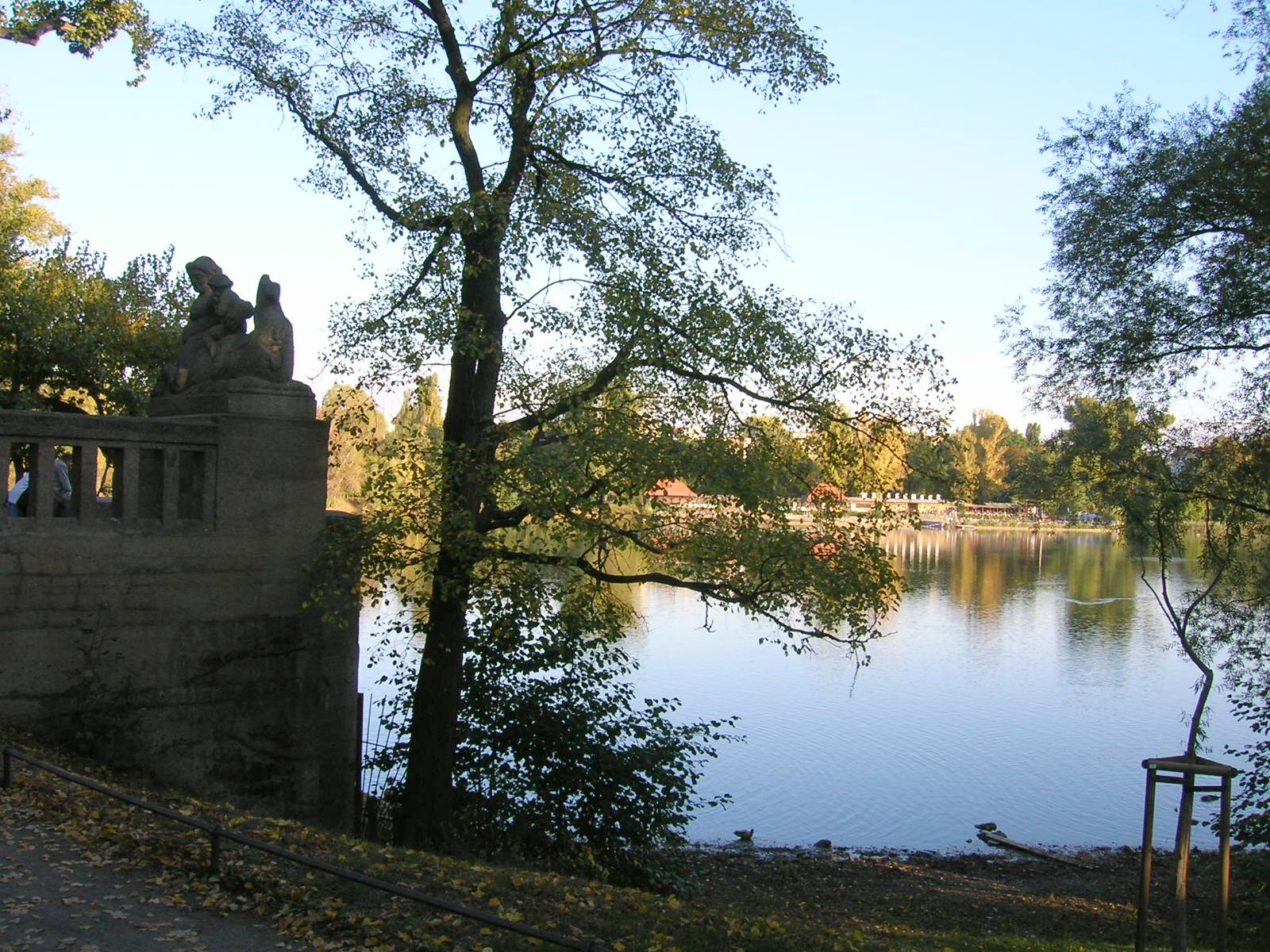
Weisser See

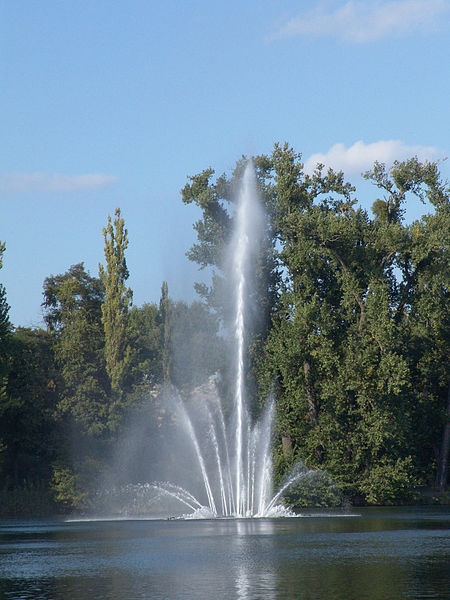
Weisser See fountain

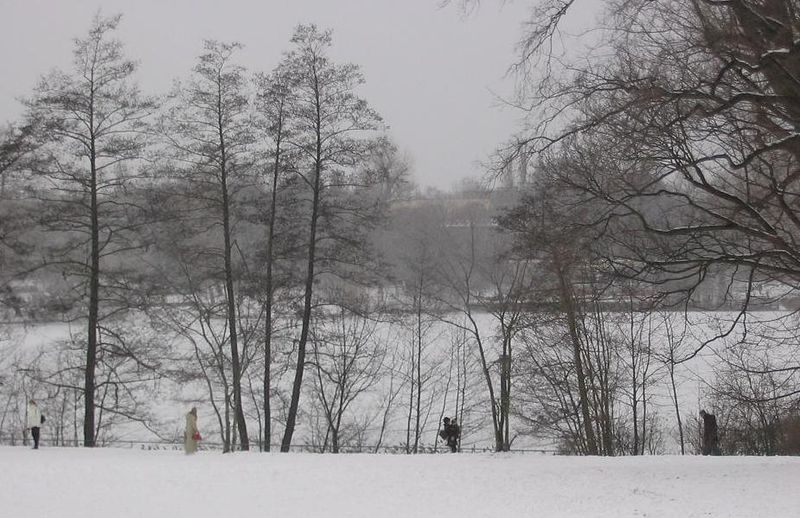
Weisser See in Winter

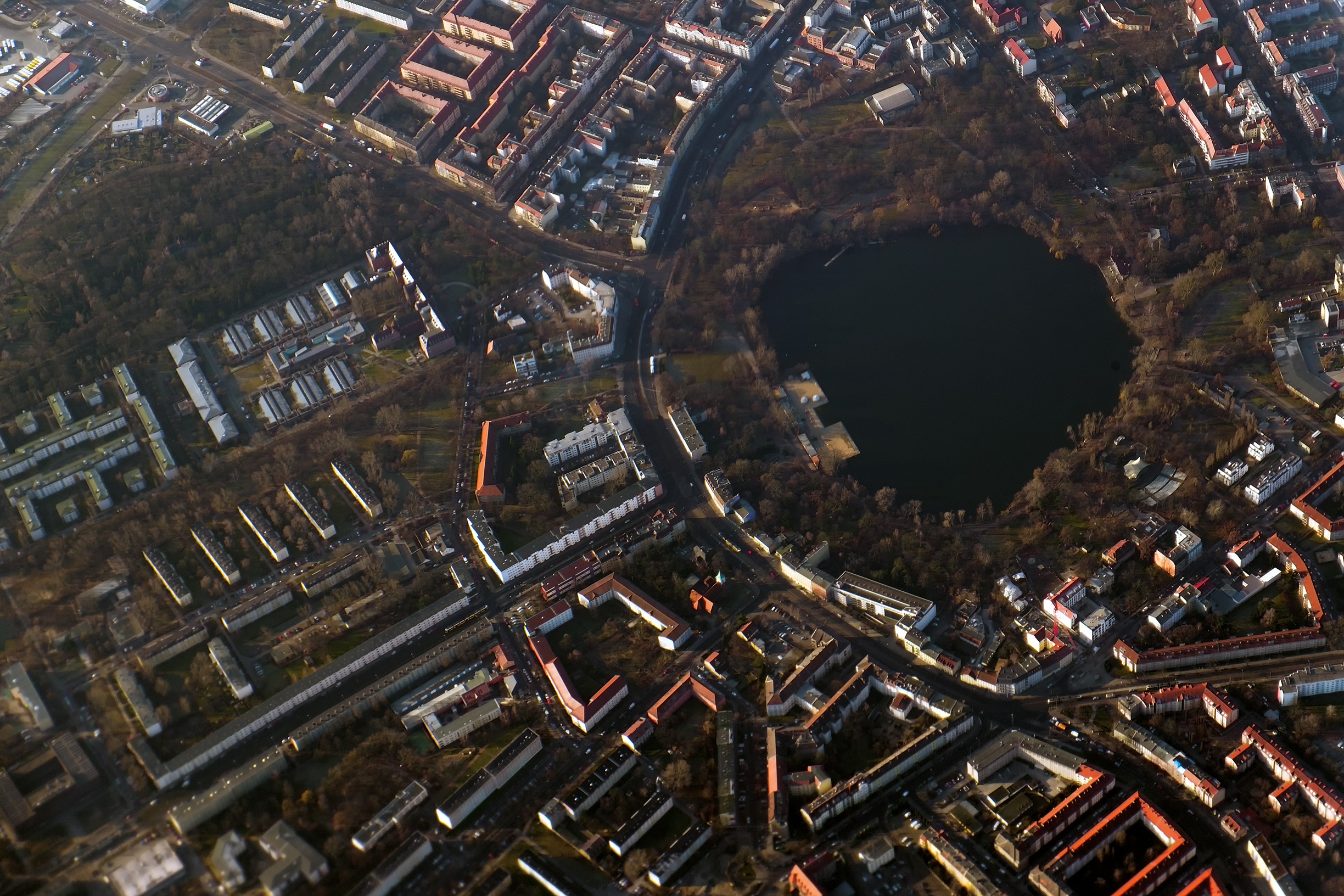
Photo taken from airplane
