= Französisch Buchholz =

- Quarter of Berlin
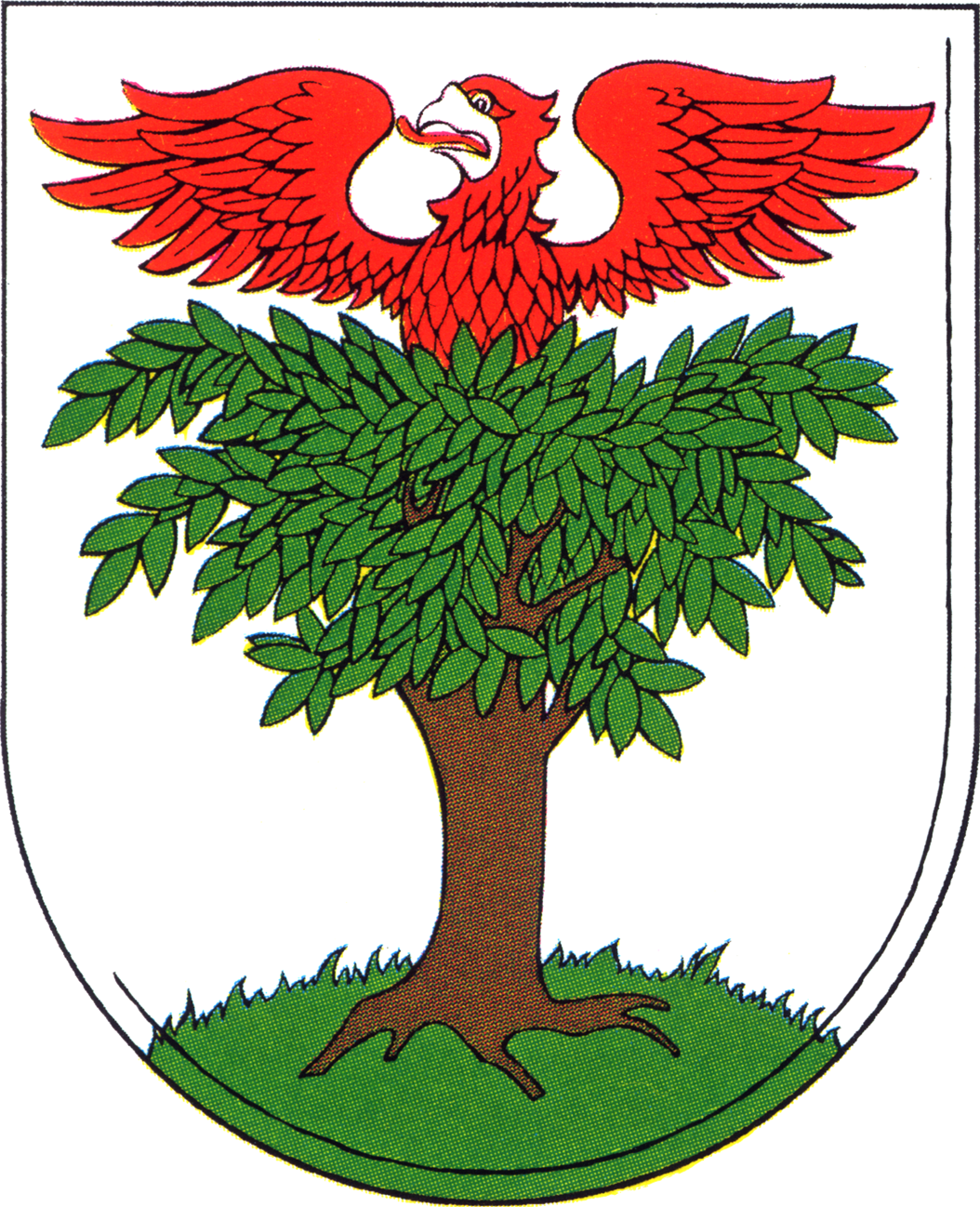
- Coat of arms

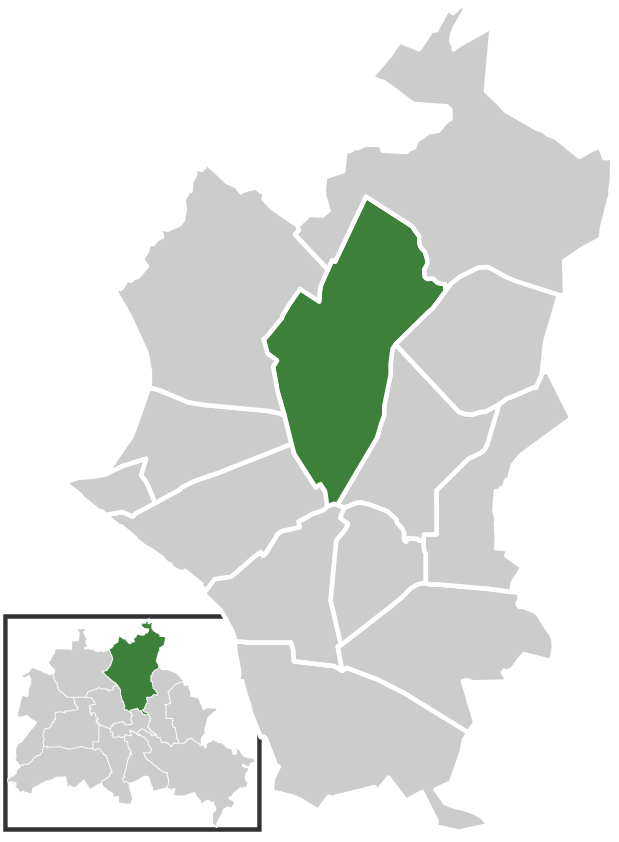
- Location of Französisch Buchholz in Pankow and Berlin
- Interactive map of Französisch Buchholz
- Location within Germany Location within Berlin
- Coordinates: 52°37′07″N 13°23′24″E
- Country: Germany
- State: Berlin
- City: Berlin
- Borough: Pankow
- Founded: 1242

Area
  - Total: 12 km^{2} (4.6 sq mi)
- Elevation: 80 m (260 ft)

Population (2024-12-31)
  - Total: 21,823
  - Density: 1,800/km^{2} (4,700/sq mi)
- Time zone: UTC+01:00 (CET)
  - Summer (DST): UTC+02:00 (CEST)
- Postal codes: 13127
- Vehicle registration: B
- Website: Official website

Französisch Buchholz (German pronunciation: [fʁanˈtsøːzɪʃ ˈbuːxhɔlts]), also known simply as Buchholz, is a German locality (Ortsteil) within the Berlin borough (Bezirk) of Pankow.

== History ==
First mentioned in 1242 as Buckholtz in a document, it became the property of Frederick William I in 1670. In 1685, after the Edict of Potsdam, it was formed as a French colony (Französische Kolonie), a residence for French Huguenots. An autonomous municipality of Brandenburg, named Berlin-Buchholz after 1913, it was merged into Berlin in 1920 by the "Greater Berlin Act". From 1949 to 1990 it was part of East Berlin.

== Geography ==
Located in the northern suburbs of the city, but totally surrounded by the territory of Berlin, Buchholz borders on Buch, Karow, Blankenburg, Pankow, Niederschönhausen, Rosenthal and Blankenfelde. In the north of the quarter is situated the natural reserve "Karower Teiche", part of the Barnim Nature Park.

== Transport ==
Crossed by the S-Bahn line S8 and by the Heidekrautbahn, it is not directly served by urban railways except for the tramway line 50, that passes through all the quarter. The nearest S-Bahn stations are Blankenburg and Pankow-Heinersdorf, situated on the lines S2 and S8. Französisch Buchholz is also traversed, at its northern borders, by the Berliner beltway (A10, known as "Berliner Ring"), that is linked to the short motorway A114. The exits n.2 ("Schönerlinder Straße"), n.3 (Bucher Straße) and n.4 ("Pasewalker Straße") serve the locality.

== Photogallery ==
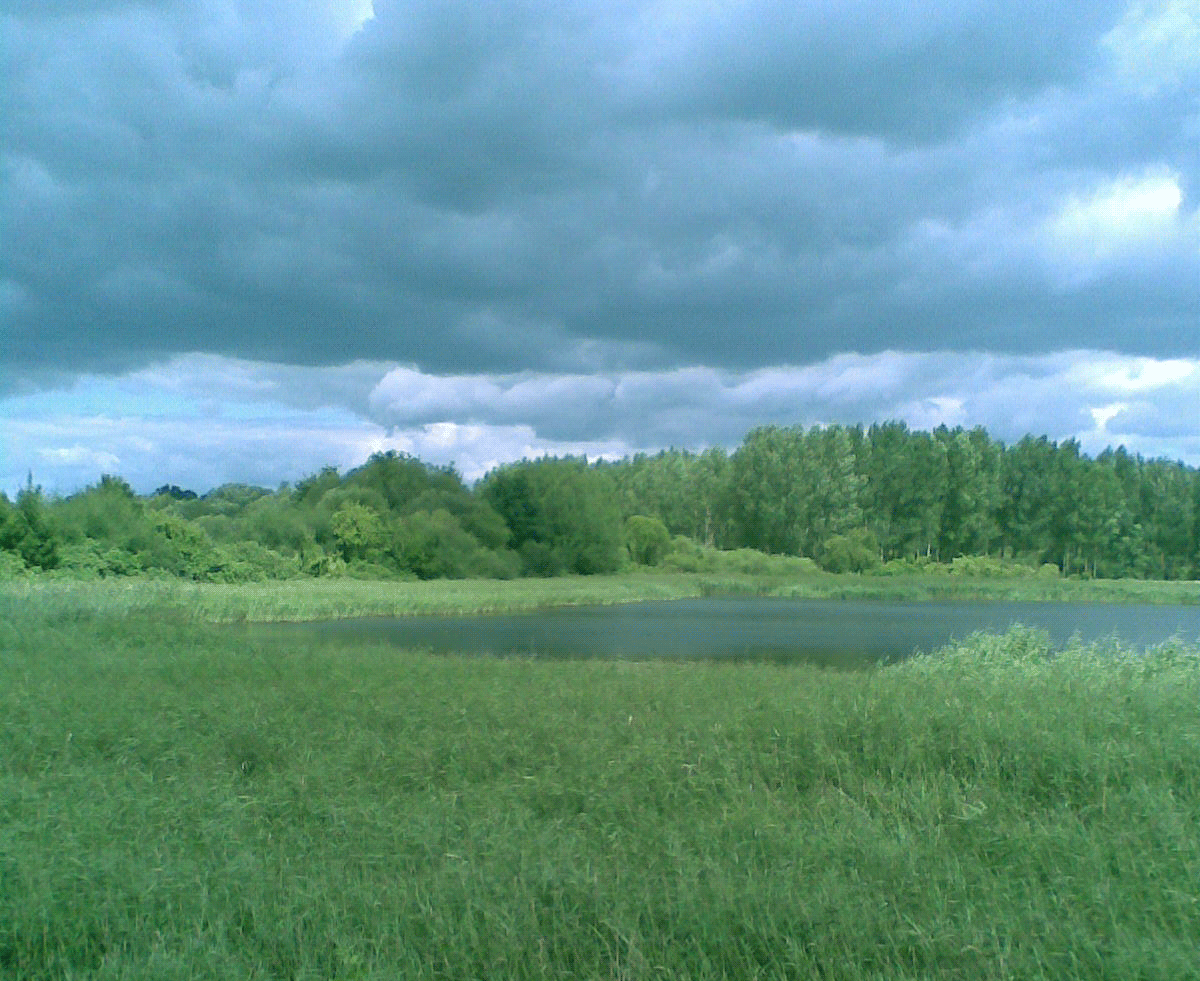
View of the natural reserve "Karower Teiche"

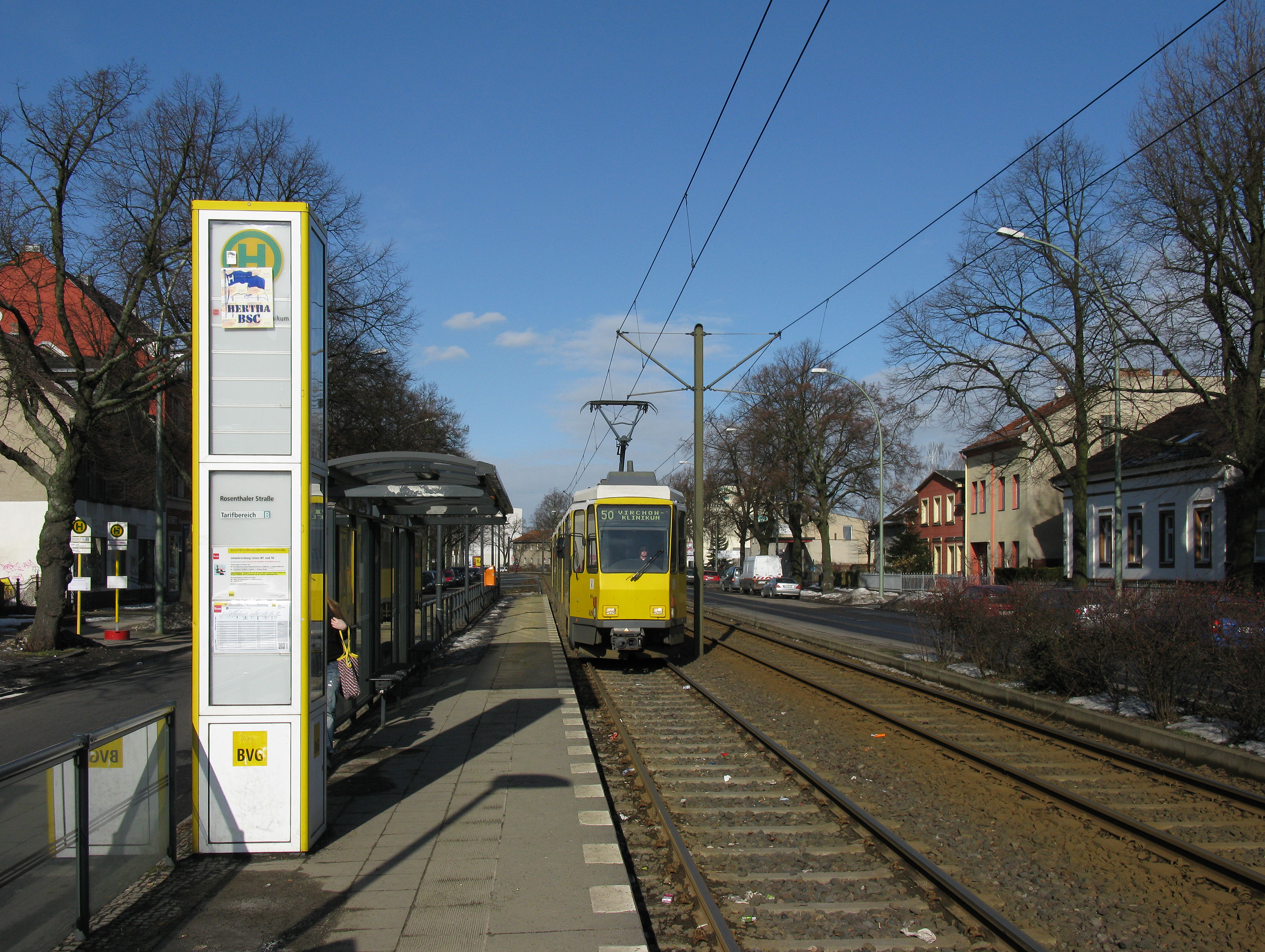
Tram stop at Rosenthaler Straße (line 50)

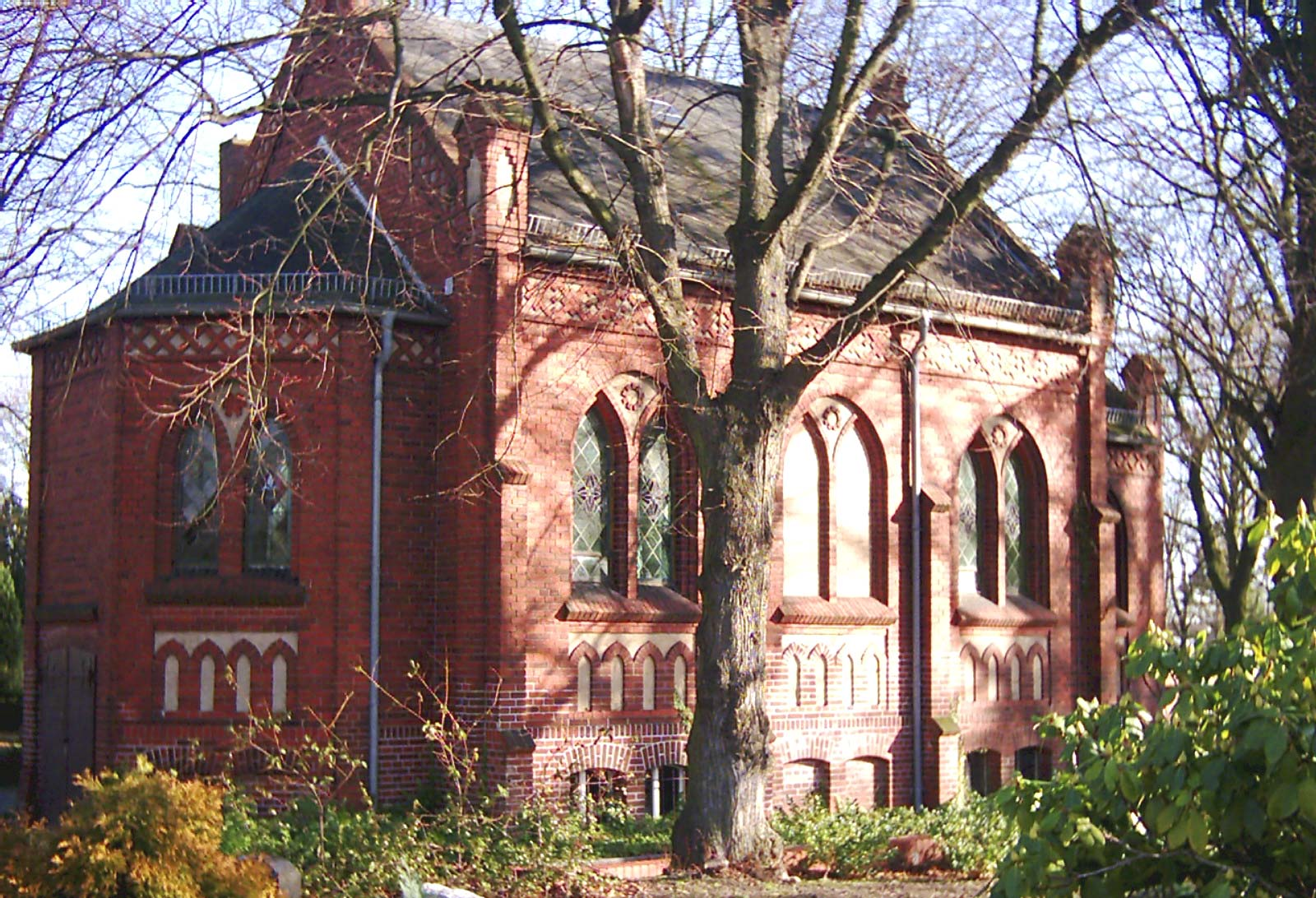
Feierhalle at the local cemetery
