= Karow (Berlin) =

- Quarter of Berlin
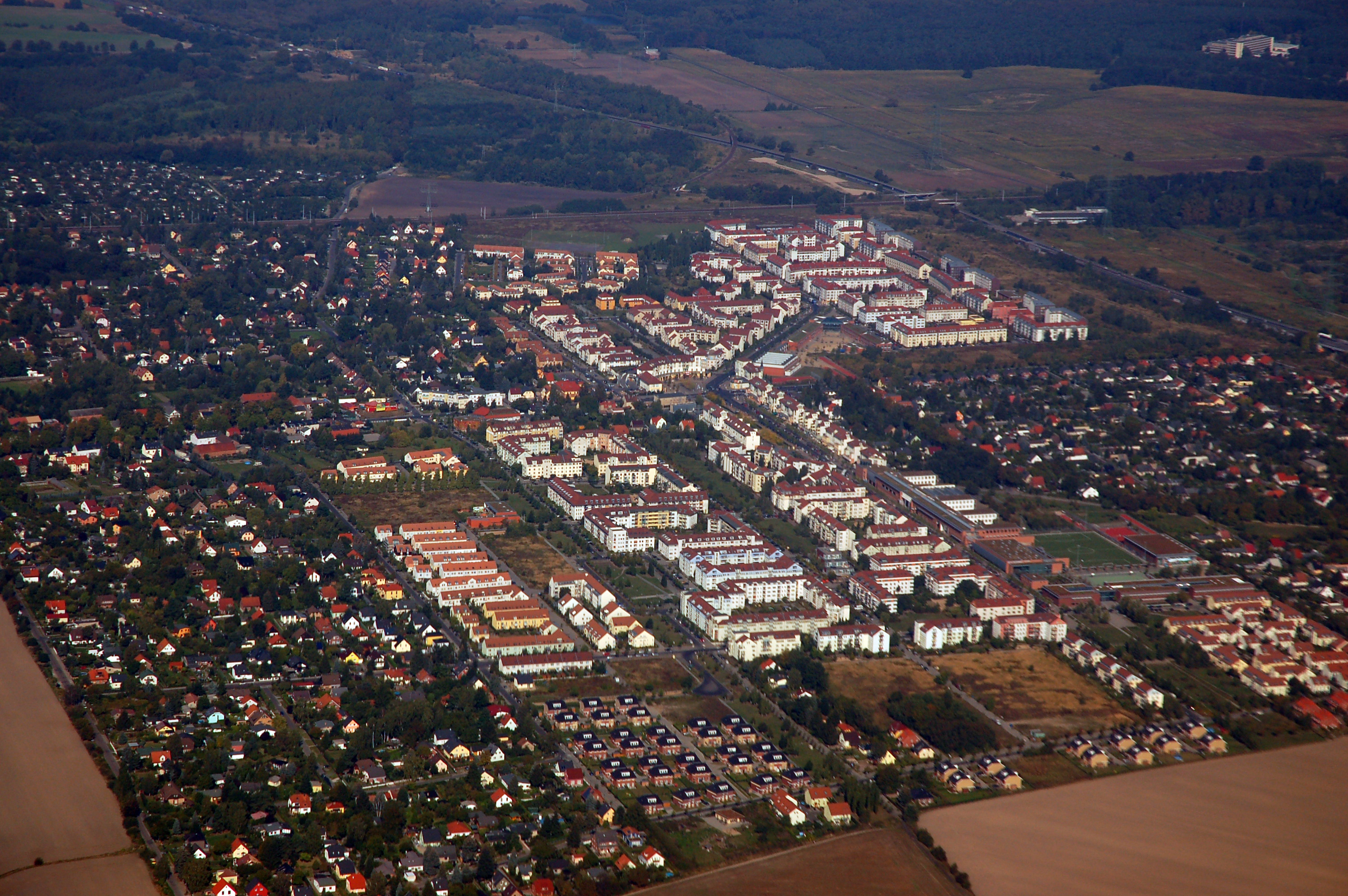
- aerial view of the quarter

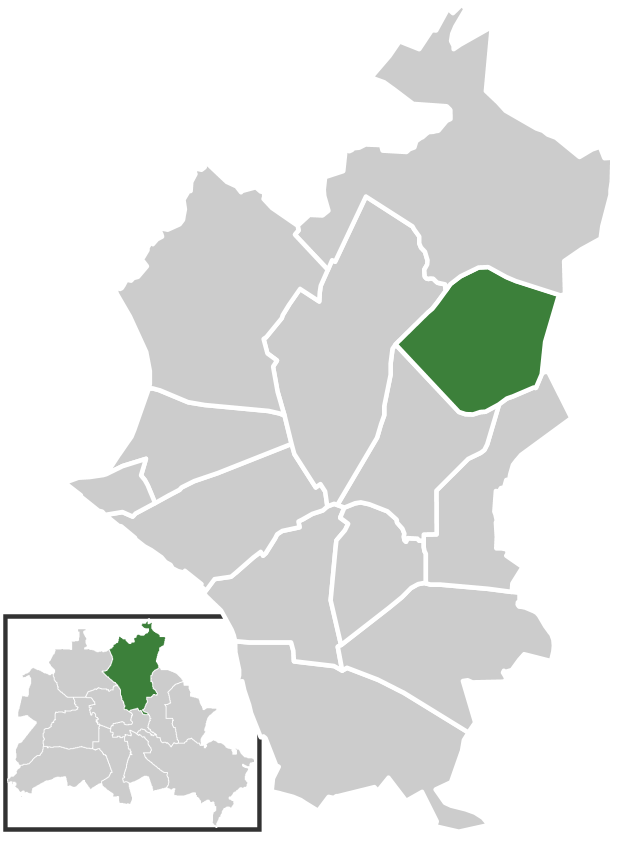
- Location of Karow in Pankow and Berlin
- Interactive map of Karow
- Location within Germany Location within Berlin
- Coordinates: 52°36′52″N 13°28′11″E
- Country: Germany
- State: Berlin
- City: Berlin
- Borough: Pankow
- Founded: 1375

Area
  - Total: 6.65 km^{2} (2.57 sq mi)
- Elevation: 60 m (200 ft)

Population (2024-12-31)
  - Total: 20,185
  - Density: 3,040/km^{2} (7,860/sq mi)
- Time zone: UTC+01:00 (CET)
  - Summer (DST): UTC+02:00 (CEST)
- Postal codes: 13125
- Vehicle registration: B
- Website: Official website

Karow (German pronunciation: [ˈkaːʁoː]) is a German locality (Ortsteil) within the Berlin borough (Bezirk) of Pankow. Until 2001 it was part of the former Weißensee borough.

== History ==
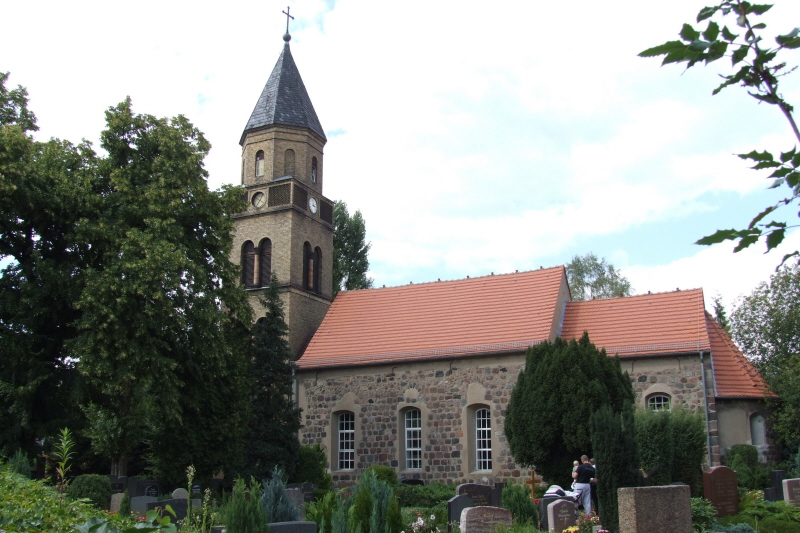
Village church

The locality was first mentioned in 1375 with the name of Kare. Autonomous Prussian municipality of the former Niederbarnim district, Karow was incorporated into Berlin in 1920, with the "Greater Berlin Act".

== Geography ==
=== Overview ===
Located in the north-eastern suburb of Berlin, it borders with the localities of Buch, Französisch Buchholz, Blankenburg and Stadtrandsiedlung Malchow. It also borders, on the east, with the Brandenburger town of Ahrensfelde, in the district of Barnim. Part of its territory, close to the natural reserve Karower Teiche (in Buchholz) is included in Barnim Nature Park.

=== Subdivision ===
Karow counts 1 zone (Ortslage):

- Stadtrandsiedlung Buch

== Transport ==
The locality is served by the S-Bahn station of Karow, on the line S2. This station is also the endpoint of a local railway, the Heidekrautbahn.

The Berliner beltway (A10, known as "Berliner Ring") crosses Karow and separates it from Buch. An exit serving the quarter (n.3 "Bucher Straße") is located on the short motorway A114.

== Photogallery ==
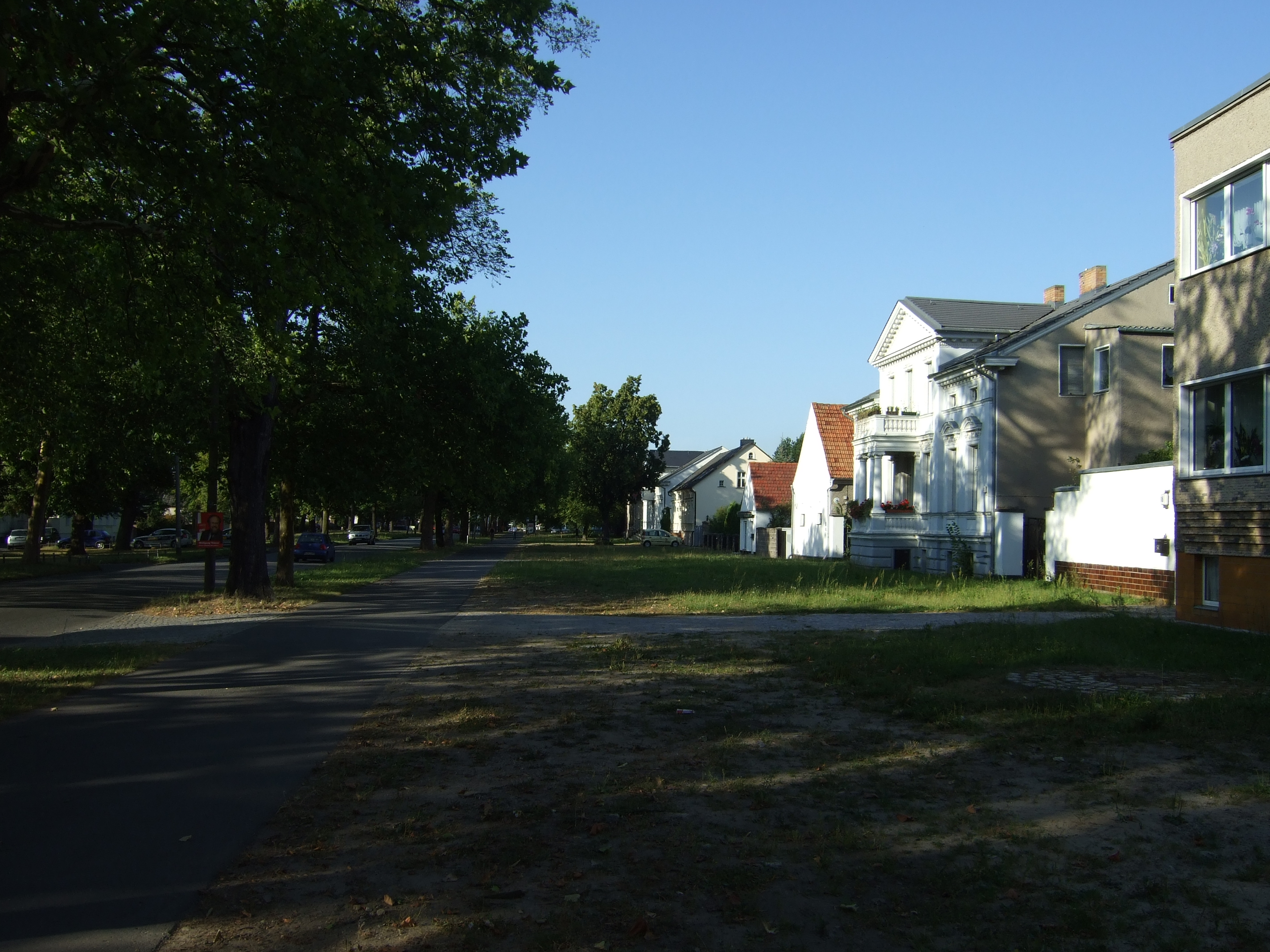
The old centre "Alt-Karow"

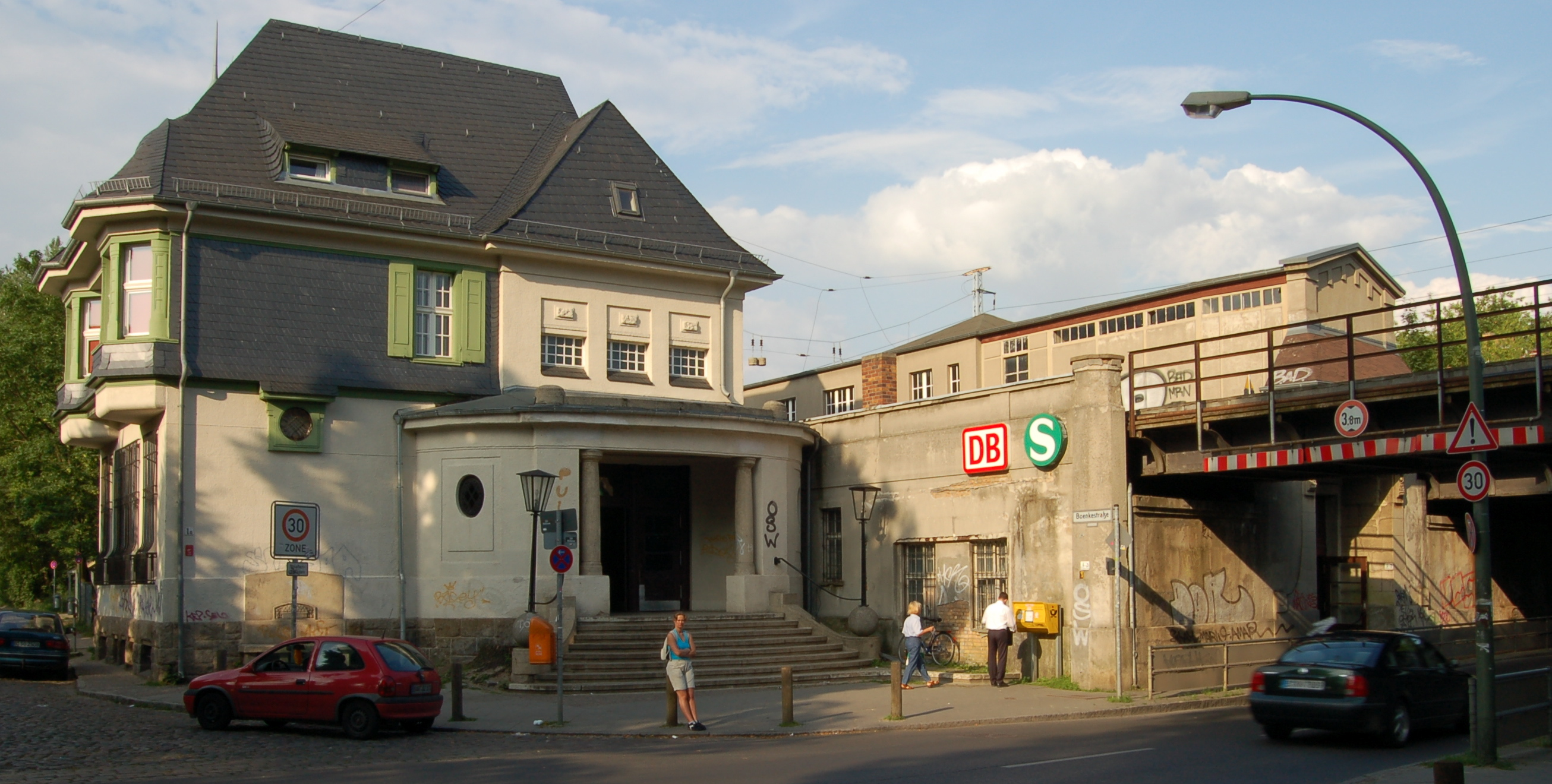
Berlin-Karow station building

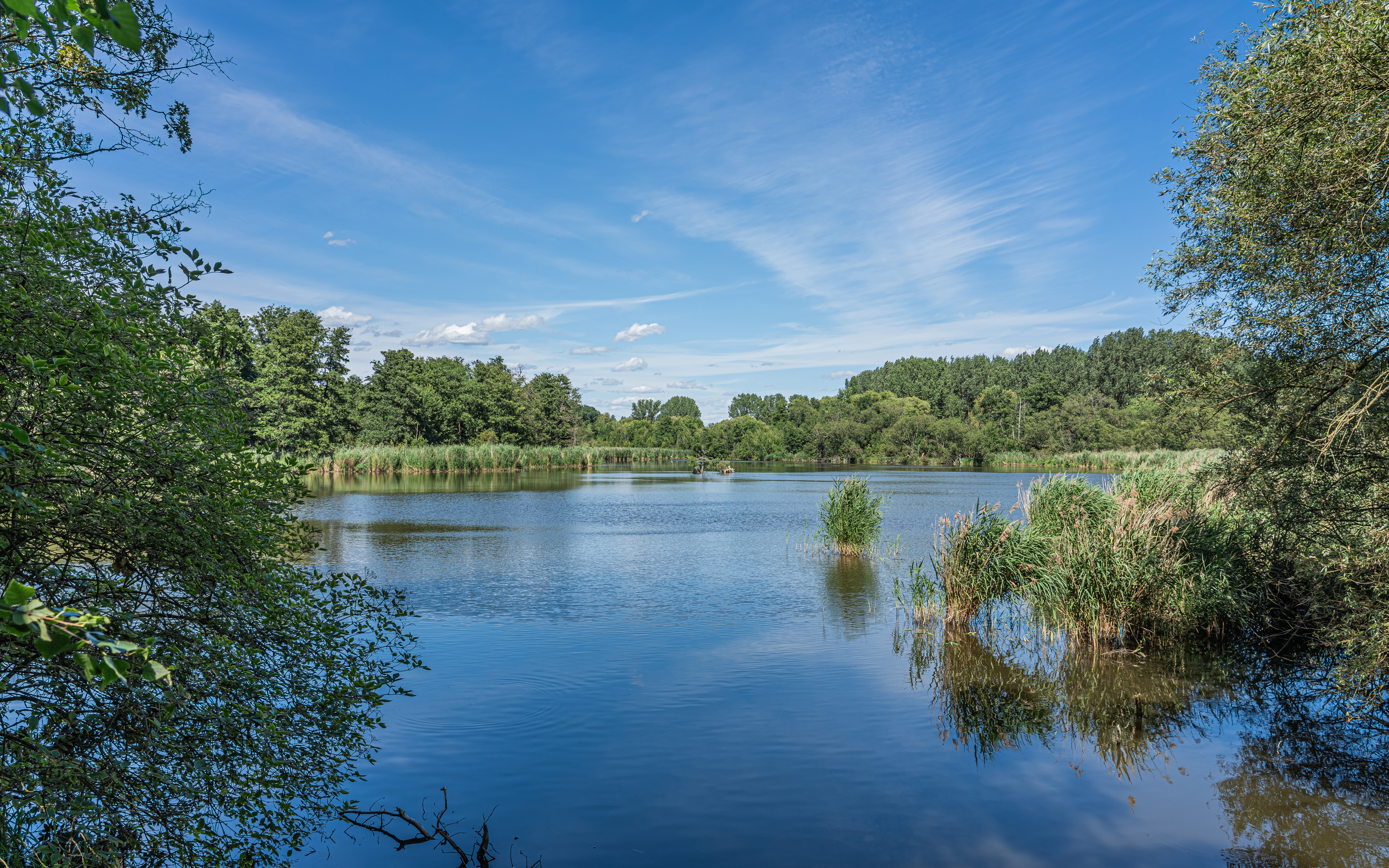
View of the Karower Teiche

== Literature ==
- Martin Eckart Pfannschmidt: "Geschichte der Berliner Vororte Buch und Karow", Berlin 1927
