= Weißensee (Berlin) =

- Quarter of Berlin
- Coat of arms
- Interactive map of Weißensee
- Location within Germany Location within Berlin
- Coordinates: 52°33′N 13°28′E
- Country: Germany
- State: Berlin
- City: Berlin
- Borough: Pankow
- Founded: 1313

Government
  - Mayor: Daniel Ecke

Area
  - Total: 7.93 km^{2} (3.06 sq mi)
- Elevation: 90 m (300 ft)

Population (2024-12-31)
  - Total: 57,552
  - Density: 7,260/km^{2} (18,800/sq mi)
- Time zone: UTC+01:00 (CET)
  - Summer (DST): UTC+02:00 (CEST)
- Postal codes: 13086, 13088
- Vehicle registration: B
- Website: www.berlin.de/special/stadtteile/weissensee/

Weißensee (German pronunciation: [ˈvaɪsn̩ˌzeː]) is a quarter in the borough of Pankow in Berlin, Germany, that takes its name from the small lake Weißer See (literally 'White Lake') within it. Before Berlin's 2001 administrative reform, Weißensee was a borough in its own right, consisting of the quarters of: Weißensee, Heinersdorf, Blankenburg, Karow, and Stadtrandsiedlung Malchow. A fictional German-language TV series by the same name is set in the borough, between 1980 and 1990, during the Bolshevik era.

== History ==
Weißensee was first mentioned in 1313 as Wittense. The first settlers subsisted on fishing and established themselves on the eastern shore of the lake, where an old trade route connected Berlin with Szczecin (German: Stettin) and the Baltic Sea – today the Bundesstraße 2 federal highway.

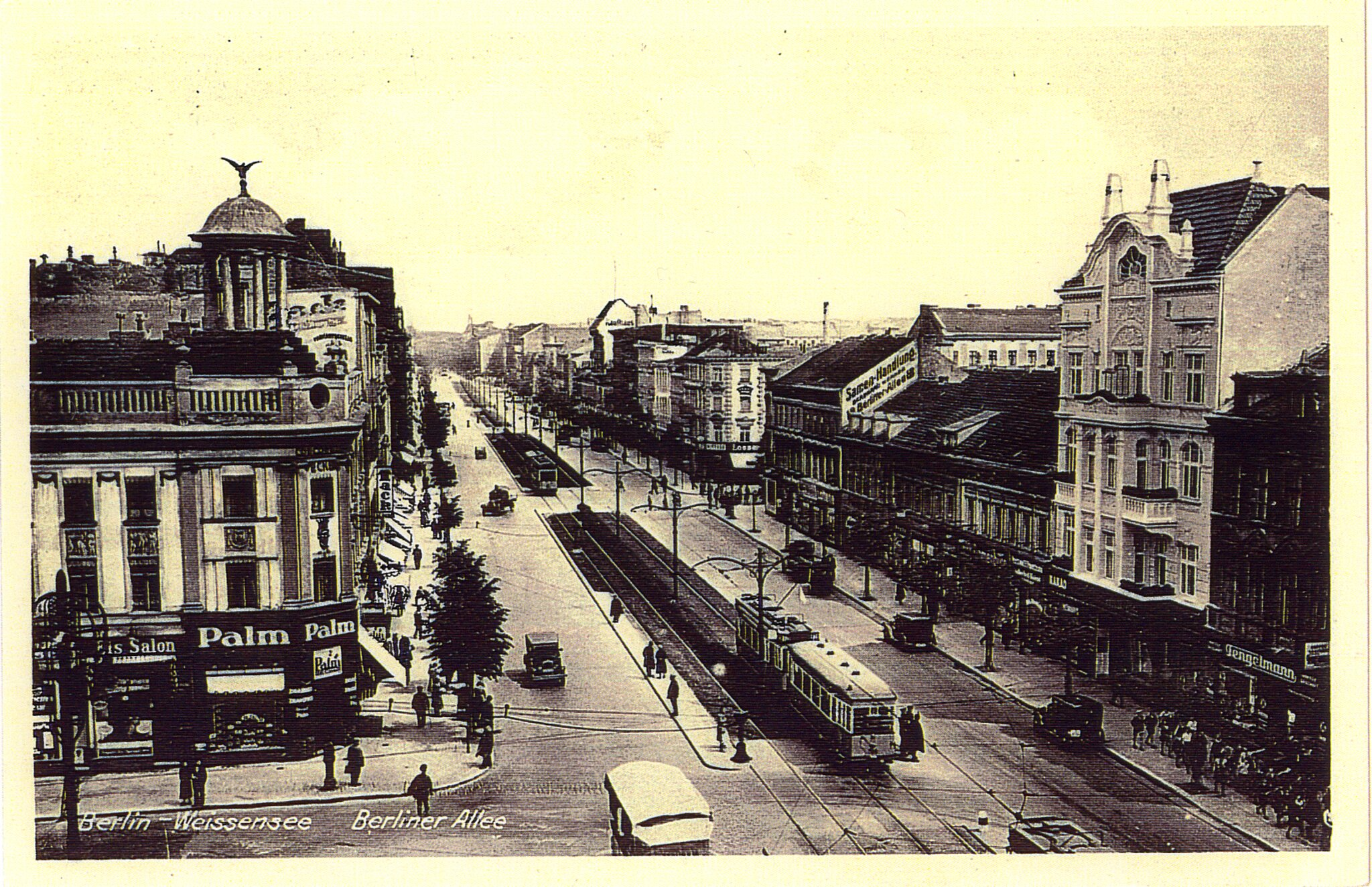
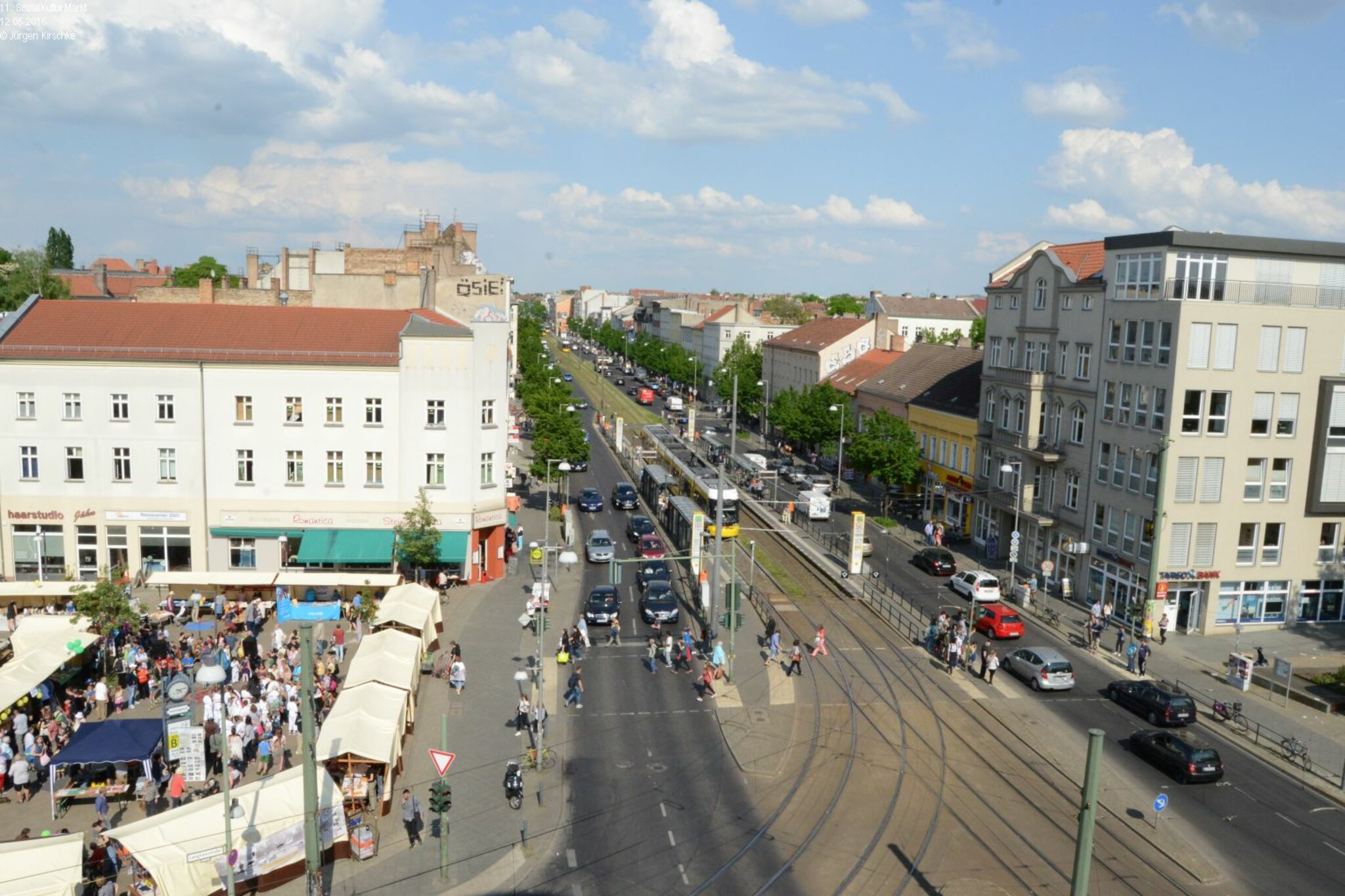

1920s vs. 2020

From 1914 onwards, the Weissensee Studios produced a number of silent films including works by Fritz Lang and the expressionist film The Cabinet of Dr. Caligari. Weißensee has historically been overshadowed by its neighboring Ortsteile (localities) Prenzlauer Berg and Pankow, however its popularity is increasing due to its proximity to the hip but more expensive Prenzlauer Berg. Its trams make reaching Berlin Mitte very convenient.

== Education in Weißensee ==
=== Kindergarten ===
Kindergarten EinStein, Klax-Kinder, Kita St.Josef, Kindergarten Staustraße, others

=== Primary School ===
Schule am Hamburgerplatz, Grundschule am Weißensee, Schule am Wasserturm, others

=== High School ===
Heinz-Brand-Schule, Hagenback-Oberschule, others

=== Gymnasium ===
Primo-Levi-Gymnasium, Robert-Havemann-Gymnasium, others

=== Technical college ===
Max-Bill-Schule

=== University/College ===
Kunsthochschule Berlin-Weißensee

== Overview ==
Weißensee is one of the most peaceful districts of Berlin. The immediate area around the lake Weißer See is characterized by its historic architecture, numerous places of interest, parks, lakes, and activities. The Weißensee Academy of Art Berlin (Kunsthochschule Berlin-Weißensee) is of national rank. The Radrennbahn Weissensee cycling track has also hosted popular music concerts. The largest concert ever held here was a Bruce Springsteen concert on July 19, 1988, attended by an estimated 160,000 people. At Weißensee Cemetery, one of Europe's largest Jewish cemeteries, notable people such as painter Lesser Ury and publishers Samuel Fischer and Rudolf Mosse are buried.

The lake is almost circular in shape with a diameter of up to 300 metres (980 ft) and is up to 10.6 metres (35 ft) deep. With an area of 8.3 hectares (890,000 sq ft), Weißer See has a water volume of 360,000 cubic metres (13,000,000 cu ft).

== Public transport ==
Public transportation in Germany is widespread, especially in its capital city, Berlin. The BVG is the main transport company in Berlin. Both buses and trams service Weißensee.

=== Bus ===
255 in the directions of Schwarzelfenweg and U Osloer Str.

259 in the directions of Aubertstr. and Stadion Buschallee/Hansastr.

=== Tram ===
M4 in the directions of Falkenberg or Zingster Str. and S Hackescher Markt
