= Pankow 1 =

State electoral district of Germany

- Electoral district for the Berlin House of Representatives
- Pankow 1 in 2026
- District: Pankow
- Electorate: 34,980 (2026)

Current electoral district
- Party: CDU
- Member: Johannes Kraft

Pankow 1 is an electoral constituency (German: Wahlkreis) represented in the House of Representatives of Berlin. It elects one member via first-past-the-post voting.

== Geography ==
The constituency comprises the areas of Buch, Karow, and the eastern part of Französisch Buchholz within the borough of Pankow.

There were 34,980 eligible voters in 2026.

== Members ==
Election	Member	Party	%
2006	Ralf Hillenberg	SPD	34.0
2011	Rainer-Michael Lehmann	SPD	31.4
2016	Christian Buchholz	AfD	22.4
2021	Johannes Kraft	CDU	25.4
2023	Johannes Kraft	CDU	41.6
2026	Johannes Kraft	CDU	28.3

== Election results ==
=== 2026 election ===
State election (2026): Pankow 1
Notes:	Blue background denotes the winner of the electorate vote. Pink background denotes a candidate elected from their party list. Yellow background denotes an electorate win by a list member, or other incumbent. A ✓ or ✗ denotes status of any incumbent, win or lose respectively.						
Party	Candidate	Votes	%	±%	Party votes	%	±%
CDU	✓ Johannes Kraft	7,281	28.3	▼13.3	4,994	19.3	▼14.3
AfD	Christian Buchholz	6,865	26.7	▲10.9	7,175	27.7	▲10.7
Left	Maxi Häber	4,329	16.8	▲6.7	4,656	18.0	▲6.9
Greens	Bettina Jarasch	2,436	9.5	▲0.3	2,472	9.5	▲0.2
SPD	Rona Tietje	2,342	9.1	▼5.2	2,511	9.7	▼6.5
BSW	Andreas Kübler	1,378	5.4		1,706	6.6	
Volt	Charlene Lorenz	572	2.2		476	1.8	▲1.4
Tierschutzpartei					775	3.0	▲0.2
FDP	Stefan Andresen	547	2.1	▼0.4	684	2.6	▼0.8
PARTEI					248	1.0	▼0.2
PdF					97	0.4	
ÖDP					46	0.2	▲0.1
DKP					39	0.2	Steady
du.					11	0.0	▼0.1
SGP					9	0.0	Steady
Informal votes		491			342		
Total valid votes		25,750			25,899		
Turnout		26,241	75.0	▲11.1			
CDU hold	Majority	416	1.6	▼24.2			

=== 2023 repeat election ===
Changes denoted below for the 2023 election are compared to the 2016 election, as the 2021 election was declared invalid.

State election (2023): Pankow 1
Notes:	Blue background denotes the winner of the electorate vote. Pink background denotes a candidate elected from their party list. Yellow background denotes an electorate win by a list member, or other incumbent. A ✓ or ✗ denotes status of any incumbent, win or lose respectively.						
Party	Candidate	Votes	%	±%	Party votes	%	±%
CDU	Johannes Kraft	9,085	41.6	▲21.6	7,324	33.6	▲17.2
AfD	✗ Christian Buchholz	3,449	15.8	▼6.6	3,711	17.0	▼5.3
SPD	Willi Francke	3,117	14.3	▼6.9	3,533	16.2	▼3.4
Left	Elke Breitenbach	2,205	10.1	▼9.1	2,407	11.0	▼7.8
Greens	Christoph Göring	1,998	9.2	▲2.0	2,049	9.4	▲1.9
Tierschutzpartei	Tinja Bempreiksz	640	2.9		604	2.8	▲0.3
FDP	Silke Reinert	553	2.5	▼1.2	744	3.4	▼1.0
PARTEI	Sabine Kiele	289	1.3	▼0.6	243	1.1	▼0.1
The Grays					180	0.8	
Verjüngungsforschung					111	0.5	▼0.4
Gray Panthers					108	0.5	▼1.1
Volt					99	0.5	
Mieterpartei	Nicole Lindner	192	0.9		91	0.4	
dieBasis	Conny Bruhn	189	0.9		167	0.8	
FW	Olaf Eichler	113	0.5		74	0.3	
Pirates					72	0.3	▼1.0
Team Todenhöfer					47	0.2	
DKP					41	0.2	Steady
NPD					38	0.2	▼1.5
Bildet Berlin!					38	0.2	
du.					34	0.2	
Humanists					34	0.2	
Klimaliste					27	0.1	
ÖDP					19	0.1	
SGP					10	0.0	▼0.1
The Pinks/Alliance 21					9	0.0	
LKR					5	0.0	▼0.5
Bergpartei, die ÜberPartei					4	0.0	
BüSo					4	0.0	▼0.1
Informal votes		155			157		
Total valid votes		21,830			21,827		
Turnout		21,994	63.9	▼3.1			
CDU gain from AfD	Majority	5,636	25.8				

=== 2021 election (annulled) ===
The election in 2021 was annulled and rerun in 2023.

State election (2021): Pankow 1
Notes:	Blue background denotes the winner of the electorate vote. Pink background denotes a candidate elected from their party list. Yellow background denotes an electorate win by a list member, or other incumbent. A ✓ or ✗ denotes status of any incumbent, win or lose respectively.						
Party	Candidate	Votes	%	±%	Party votes	%	±%
CDU	Johannes Kraft	6,390	25.4	▲5.4	4,971	19.7	▲3.3
SPD	Willi Francke	5,286	21.0	▼0.2	5,488	21.7	▲2.1
AfD	✗ Christian Buchholz	3,457	13.7	▼8.6	3,535	14.0	▼8.3
Left	Elke Breitenbach	3,332	13.2	▼6.0	3,455	13.7	▼5.1
Alliance /The Greens	Christoph Göring	2,640	10.5	▲3.4	2,603	10.3	▲2.8
FDP	Silke Reinert	1,490	5.9	▲2.2	1,762	7.0	▲2.6
Tierschutzpartei	Tinja Bempreiksz	949	3.8		715	2.8	▲0.4
The Grays					417	1.7	
dieBasis	Conny Bruhn	483	1.9		393	1.6	
PARTEI	Sabine Kiele	454	1.8	▼0.1	376	1.5	▲0.2
FW	Olaf Eichler	444	1.8		318	1.3	
Gray Panthers					162	0.6	▼0.9
Volt					153	0.6	
Verjüngungsforschung					143	0.6	▼0.3
APT					131	0.5	
Mieterpartei	Nicole Lindner	234	0.9		101	0.4	
Pirates					94	0.4	▼1.0
Team Todenhöfer					75	0.3	
NPD					50	0.2	▼1.5
Humanists					46	0.2	
Klimaliste					45	0.2	
Bildet Berlin!					39	0.2	
DKP					37	0.1	▼0.1
ÖDP					31	0.1	
du.					26	0.1	
The Pinks/Alliance 21					20	0.1	
BüSo					17	0.1	Steady
LKR					17	0.1	▼0.4
Bergpartei, die ÜberPartei					13	0.1	
SGP					6	0.0	▼0.1
Informal votes		318			239		
Total valid votes		25,159			25,239		
Turnout		25,511	73.7	▲6.7			
CDU gain from AfD	Majority	1,104	4.4				

== See also ==
- Politics of Berlin
- House of Representatives of Berlin
