= Johannes Kraft (German politician) =

German politician (born 1977)

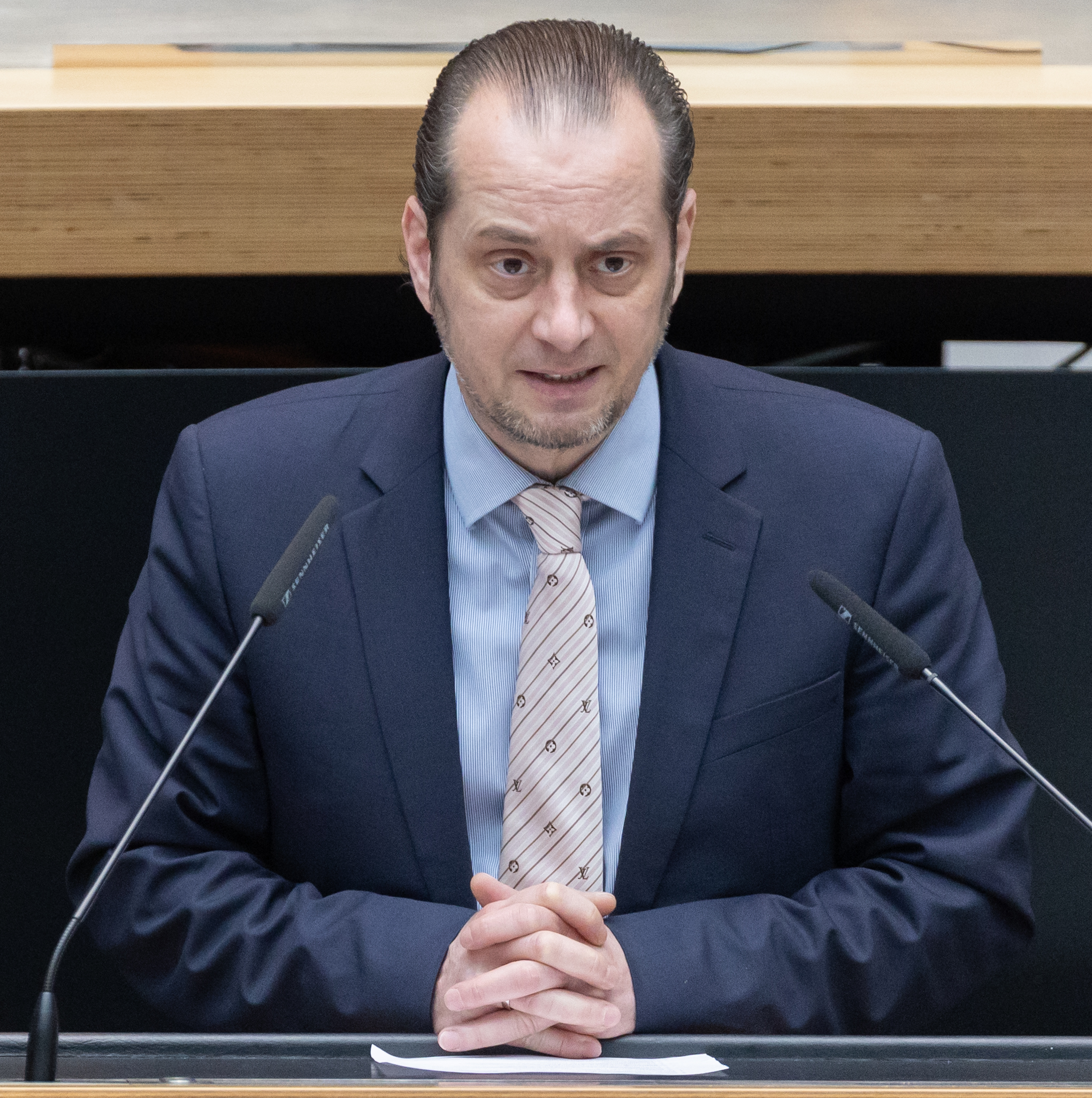
- Kraft in 2025

Member of the Berlin House of Representatives
- Incumbent
- Assumed office 4 November 2021
- Preceded by: Christian Buchholz
- Constituency: Pankow 1

Personal details
- Born: 1977 (age 48–49)
- Party: Christian Democratic Union

Johannes Kraft (born 1977) is a German politician serving as a member of the Berlin House of Representatives since 2021. From 2006 to 2021, he served as group leader of the Christian Democratic Union in the borough council of Pankow.
