= Saxonia (locomotive) =

German steam locomotive

SAXONIA
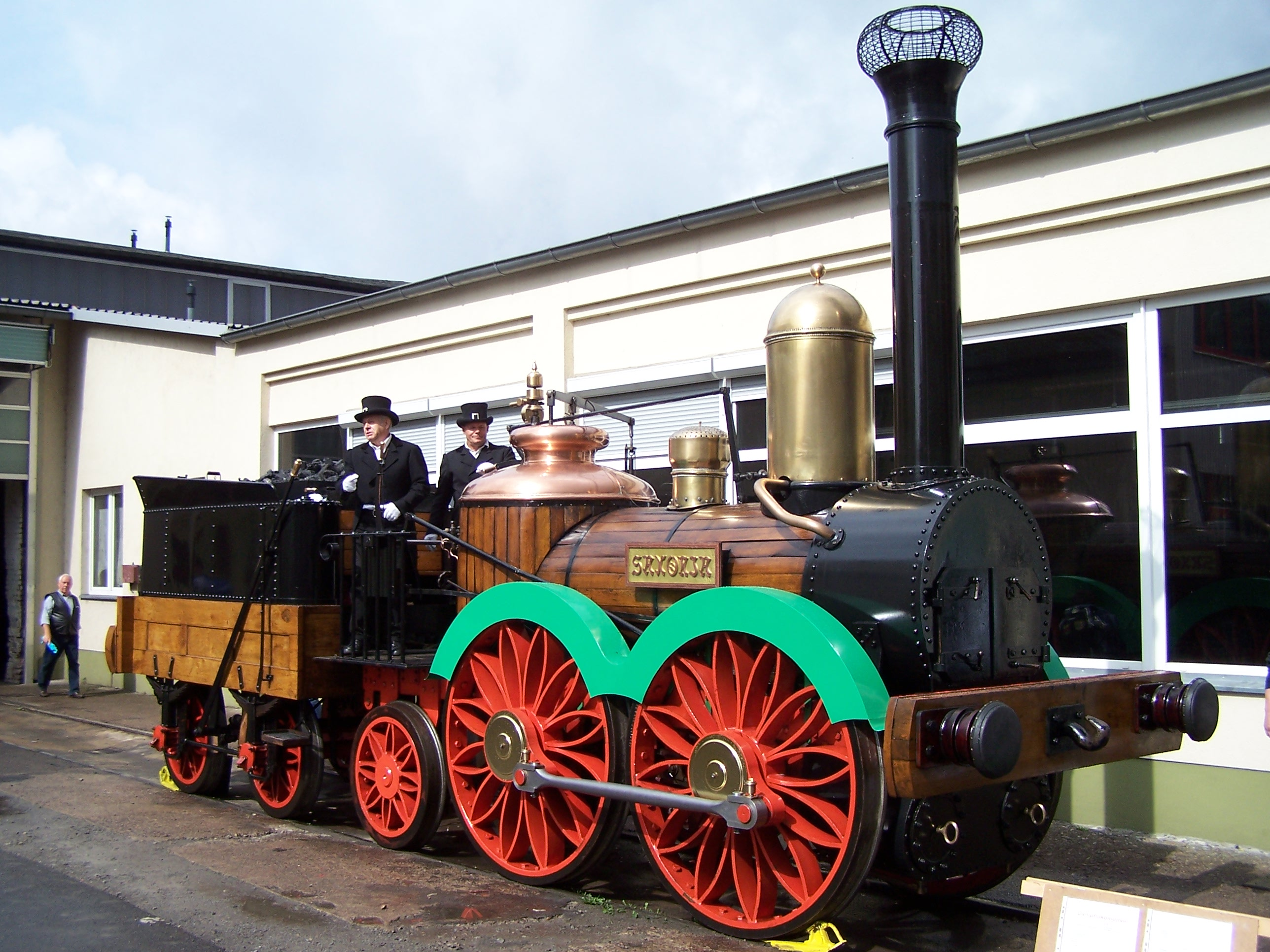
- 1989 replica at Meiningen Works in 2007
Type and origin
- Power type: Steam
- Builder: Maschinenbauanstalt Übigau, Dresden
- Build date: 1838
- Total produced: 2
Specifications
- Configuration
  - Whyte: 0-4-2
  - UIC: B1 n2
- Gauge: 1,435 mm (4 ft 8 1/2 in)
- Driver dia.: 1,524 mm (60 in)
- Trailing dia.: 990 mm (39 in)
- Wheelbase
  - Engine: 3,048 mm (10 ft 0 in)
  - Drivers: 2,120 mm (6 ft 11 1/2 in)
- Length
  - Over buffers: 8,730 mm (28 ft 8 in)
- Service weight: 15 t (14.8 long tons; 16.5 short tons)
- Firebox
  - Type
  - Grate area: 0.56 m^{2} (6.03 sq ft)
- Boiler
  - Tube plates: 2,120 mm (6 ft 11 1/2 in)
  - Small tubes: 41 mm (1 5/8 in) ID, 88 off
- Boiler pressure: 4.2 bar (420 kPa; 61 psi)
- Heating surface: 24.2 m^{2} (260 sq ft)
- Cylinders: 2, inside
- Cylinder size: 279 mm × 406 mm (11 in × 16 in)
Performance figures
- Maximum speed: 50 km/h (31 mph)
- Indicated power: 40 kW (54 hp)
Career
- Operators: Leipzig–Dresdner Eisenbahn-Compagnie
- Retired: by 1856

The locomotive Saxonia was operated by the Leipzig–Dresden Railway Company (Leipzig–Dresdner Eisenbahn-Compagnie or LDE) and was the first practical working steam locomotive built in Germany. Its name means Saxony in Latin.

== History ==
The Saxonia was built by Johann Andreas Schubert. Schubert had been inspired by the English-built locomotive, Comet, procured for the LDE, and he analysed and improved upon what he saw. He used the same dimensions but, unlike Comet, two coupled axles were driven, providing increased tractive force, and a carrying axle was added at the back to improve ride qualities.

The development and construction of the locomotive was carried out in the Maschinenbauanstalt Übigau at Dresden, an engineering works that had been founded on 1 January 1837. From the beginning Schubert was the head of the company. The construction of the engine was a technical and economic risk for the firm. For a start, it had no technical experience at all; furthermore there were no orders for a locomotive.

The Saxonia was intended to open the Leipzig–Dresden railway, the first long-distance railway line in Germany, on 8 April 1839. But the English, who until then had a monopoly within the railway industry, begrudged success to Schubert and his locomotive. The first train to run on the railway was hauled by the two English locomotives Robert Stephenson and Elephant. The Saxonia – driven by its creator, Johann Andreas Schubert –- followed on behind.

The Saxonia clearly continued to be used successfully, however, because in 1843 it had clocked up 8,666 kilometres (5,385 mi). There is no definite information about its whereabouts, however, it must have remained in the LDE's fleet until 1856 because its name was not reassigned until then.

The Übigau works built a second locomotive of the same arrangement, named Phoenix, delivered 1840-04-12.

== Technical description ==
From a technical standpoint the Saxonia reflected in the main its English counterparts. Only a few details exist about the design of the boiler. The boiler barrel had riveted longitudinal seams, the vertical boiler had a curved, cylindrical top. A flat plate on top of the vertical boiler provided a platform for the steam whistle and spring balance safety valve. On top of the front section of the boiler barrel was the tall, narrow steam dome. The grate was designed to be moveable.

The steam engine was designed as a two-cylinder inside drive with a simple inside lever valve gear (Hebelsteurung) without a steam expansion stage. The engine drove the second coupled axle.

Both coupled axles as well as the carrying axle were fixed rigidly into the frame. The wheel spokes were made of forged bar steel. Later cast wheel spokes were fitted. Because it had an inside drive the second axle had to be designed as a crank axle, which is remarkable, bearing in mind the manufacturing technology of that time. A technical innovation was the trailing axle which had been intended by Schubert mainly to improve the locomotive's riding qualities. It was subsequently determined to be superfluous and was removed in 1840. From 1842, however, the operation of twin-axled locomotives was banned on safety grounds, so the trailing axle had to be refitted. The brake was initially a screw-operated band brake which acted on the two driven wheels from the top. Because this did not prove suitable due to high wear and tear, it was later removed.

== Replica locomotive ==
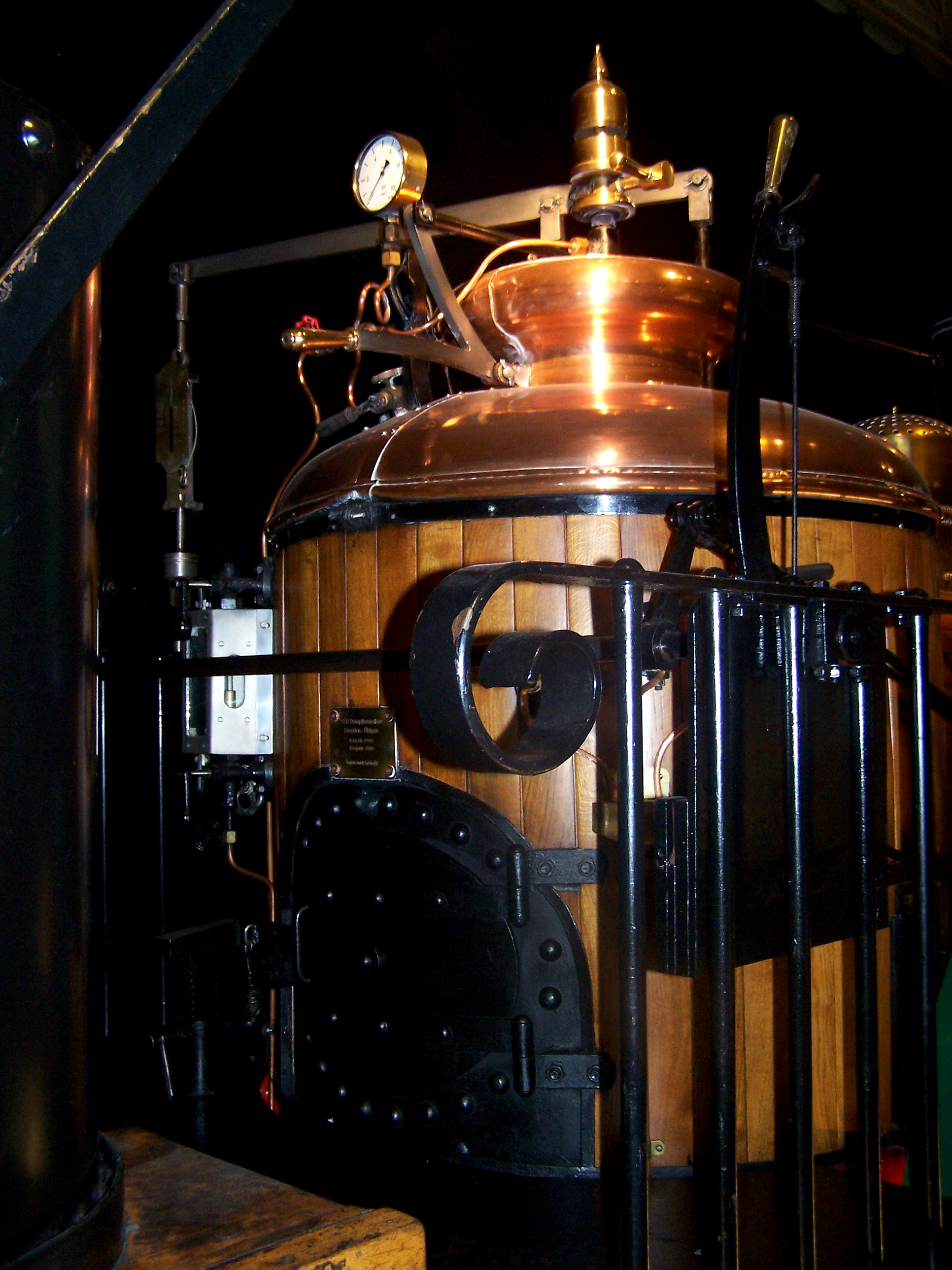
Standing part of the boiler of the Saxonia

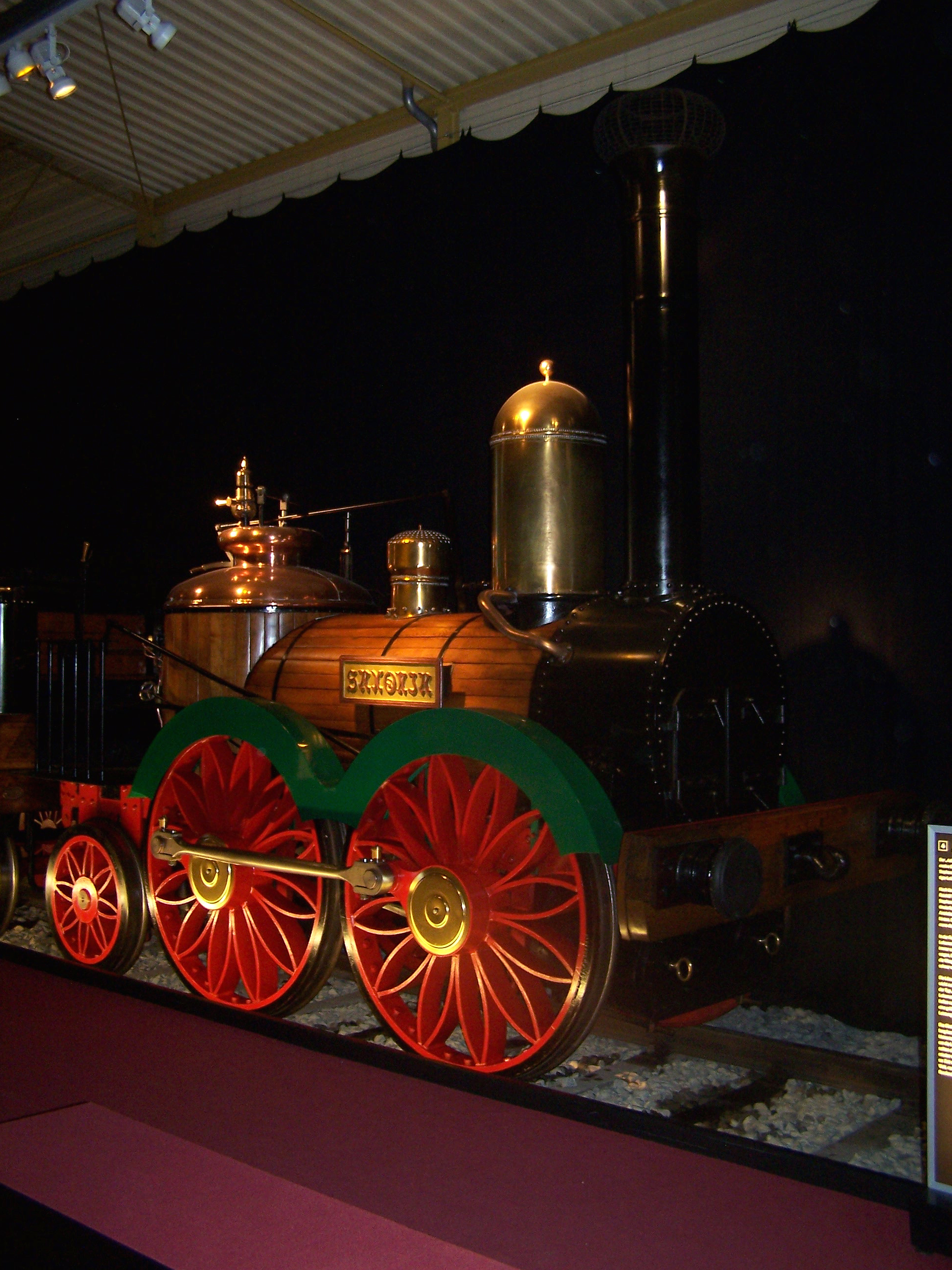
Replica of the Saxonia in the Transport Museum in Nuremberg at the exhibition "Adler, Rocket and Co."

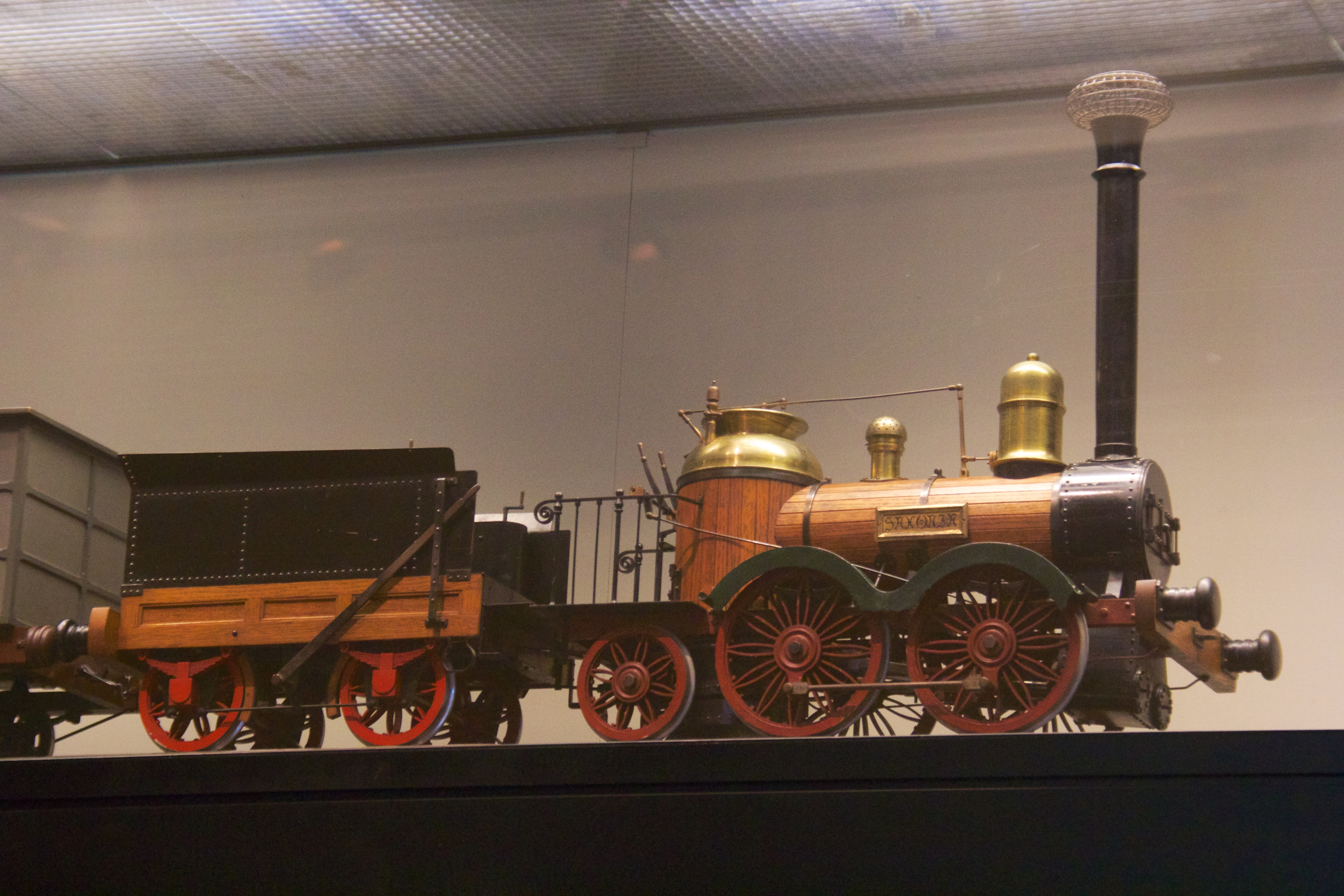
A model of the Saxonia at the Deutsches Historisches Museum.

On 11 October 1985, a working group was established by the East German government's Ministry of Transport for the construction of a replica of the locomotive. The aim was for its inaugural journey to form part of the 150th anniversary celebrations of the opening of the first German long-distance railway from Leipzig to Dresden on 8 April 1989.

Like the Adler, few original design documents existed at that time from which the replica could be built. The basis of the new design drew heavily on a blueprint of the original drawings from 1838. The dimensions and technical data were derived from the book published in 1839 by NNW Meissner. Building a replica using the original manufacturing techniques was not possible. In building the boiler current regulations had to be followed. The steam engine was a major headache. Originally the Saxonia only had a simple lever valve gear which did not enable any kind of steam admission control. For the replica Saxonia a Stephenson valve gear with open rods was planned.

The design and manufacture of the replica boiler was entrusted to the VEB Dampfkesselbau Übigau in Dresden, which had built the original boiler 150 years earlier. All other components were manufactured by various Deutsche Reichsbahn facilities. The final assembly was carried out at the Halle repair shop (Reichsbahnausbesserungswerk or Raw). The manufacture of components was taken on by the Bahnbetriebswerke (Bw i.e. locomotive depot) at Dresden, Oebisfelde, Berlin-Pankow and Weissenfels as well as the refurbishment shop (Aufarbeitungswerkstatt) at Wilsdruff.

The tender was built in the facility at Waren (Müritz) of the Neustrelitz Bw. Originally a wooden frame made of foreign hardwood was planned, largely as in the original. Trials with a replica buffer beam showed that a wooden construction of that nature had a strong tendency to crack. For that reason the tender frame was made of welded steel with a wood cladding.

On 1 October 1988 the new locomotive was fired up for the first time at Raw Halle. 14 days later she demonstrated she was fully operational during a trial run to Eisleben. On her handover journey on 12 January 1989 she even attained a speed of 70 km/h between Halle and Leipzig, as well as demonstrating smooth riding qualities and good steam generation.

The depot at Leipzig Hauptbahnhof Süd was the home stable for the new Saxonia. On 8 April 1989 she led the impressive parade of locomotives at Riesa to celebrate the opening of the Germany's first long-distance railway.

The locomotive is owned today by the DB Museum at Nuremberg. It underwent a full inspection in 2008 at the Meiningen Steam Locomotive Works and is still fully operational.

== See also ==
- Royal Saxon State Railways
- List of Saxon locomotives and railbuses
- Leipzig–Dresden Railway Company

== Sources ==
- Näbrich, Fritz; Meyer, Günter; Preuß, Reiner (1983). Lokomotivarchiv Sachsen 1 (in German). Berlin: transpress VEB Verlag für Verkehrswesen.
- Näbrich, Fritz; Preuß, Reiner; Meyer, Günter (1984). Lokomotiven sächsischer Eisenbahnen, Schnellzug- und Personenzuglokomotiven (EFA 2.1) (in German). Düsseldorf: Alba. pp. 66–67, 193. ISBN 3-87094-096-4.
- Schnabel, Heinz (March 1989). "Die SAXONIA, Original und Rekonstruktion". modelleisenbahner (in German). transpress. ISSN 0026-7422.
- Schnabel, Heinz (1989). SAXONIA. Beschreibung und Rekonstruktion einer historischen Lokomotive (in German). Berlin: transpress VEB Verlag für Verkehrswesen. ISBN 3-344-00351-8.
