= Japaneck =

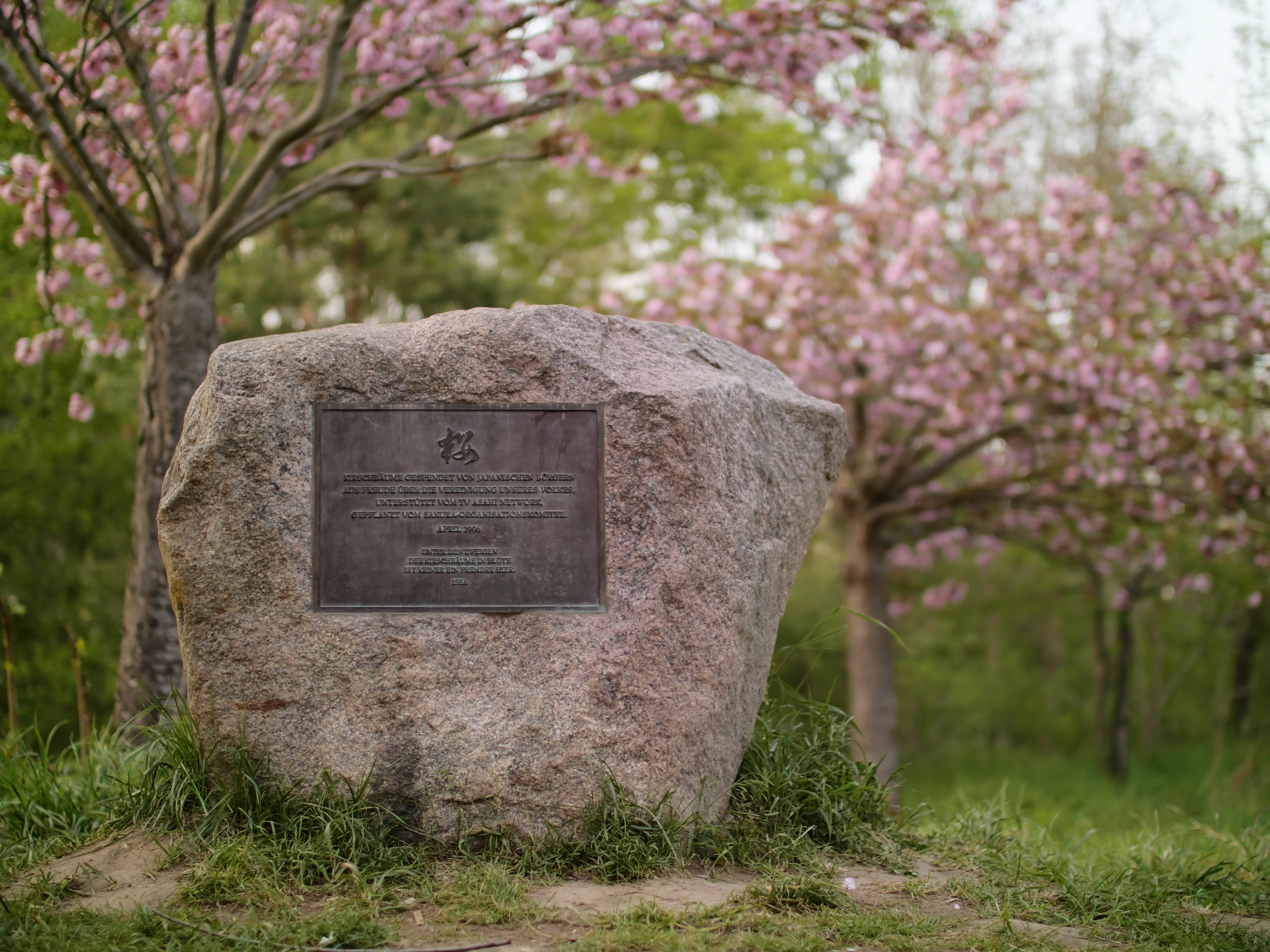
Memorial stone at Japaneck

Japaneck (also known as Japan-Eck) is the geographical name for the border triangle between Berlin and the Teltow-Fläming and Potsdam-Mittelmark districts of Brandenburg, Germany. It is the site of a memorial stone celebrating German reunification.

== Location ==
Japaneck is located between the district of Berlin-Lichterfelde (locality of Lichterfelde-Süd), Osdorf in the Heinersdorf part of the Großbeeren community and the Sigridshorst district of the city of Teltow.

At this point, the city border between Berlin and the surrounding area has a striking, almost right-angled bend. Until 1990, the border between West Berlin and the GDR ran here, with a wide strip for their border security installations that has remained largely undeveloped to this day.

The Diedersdorfer Heide and Großbeerener Graben nature reserve border it to the southeast. The former US military training area Parks Range bordered it on the Berlin side.

== Story ==
The name Japaneck comes from the fact that reporters from the Japanese television company TV Asahi visited the city of Teltow in 1989. After the fall of the Berlin Wall, there was a fundraising campaign as part of the Sakura Campaign, supported by around 20,000 Japanese citizens.

With the proceeds of around one million euros, over 1000 Japanese cherry trees (Prunus serrulata) were planted in April 1995. Today, these trees form the 1.8 km long TV Asahi cherry blossom avenue on the Brandenburg side along the Berlin state border from Japaneck in a northwesterly direction to Lichterfelder Allee, which is crossed roughly in the middle by the Berlin-Halle railway line (Anhalter Bahn) and the S-Bahn line to Teltow.

From late April to early May, the plants display their typical and striking pink petals during the Japanese cherry blossom season, which is celebrated every spring in the Japanese tradition of Hanami.

== Memorial Stone ==
Japaneck is marked by a memorial stone with an inscription and the translation of a haiku by Kobayashi Issa on a bronze plaque.

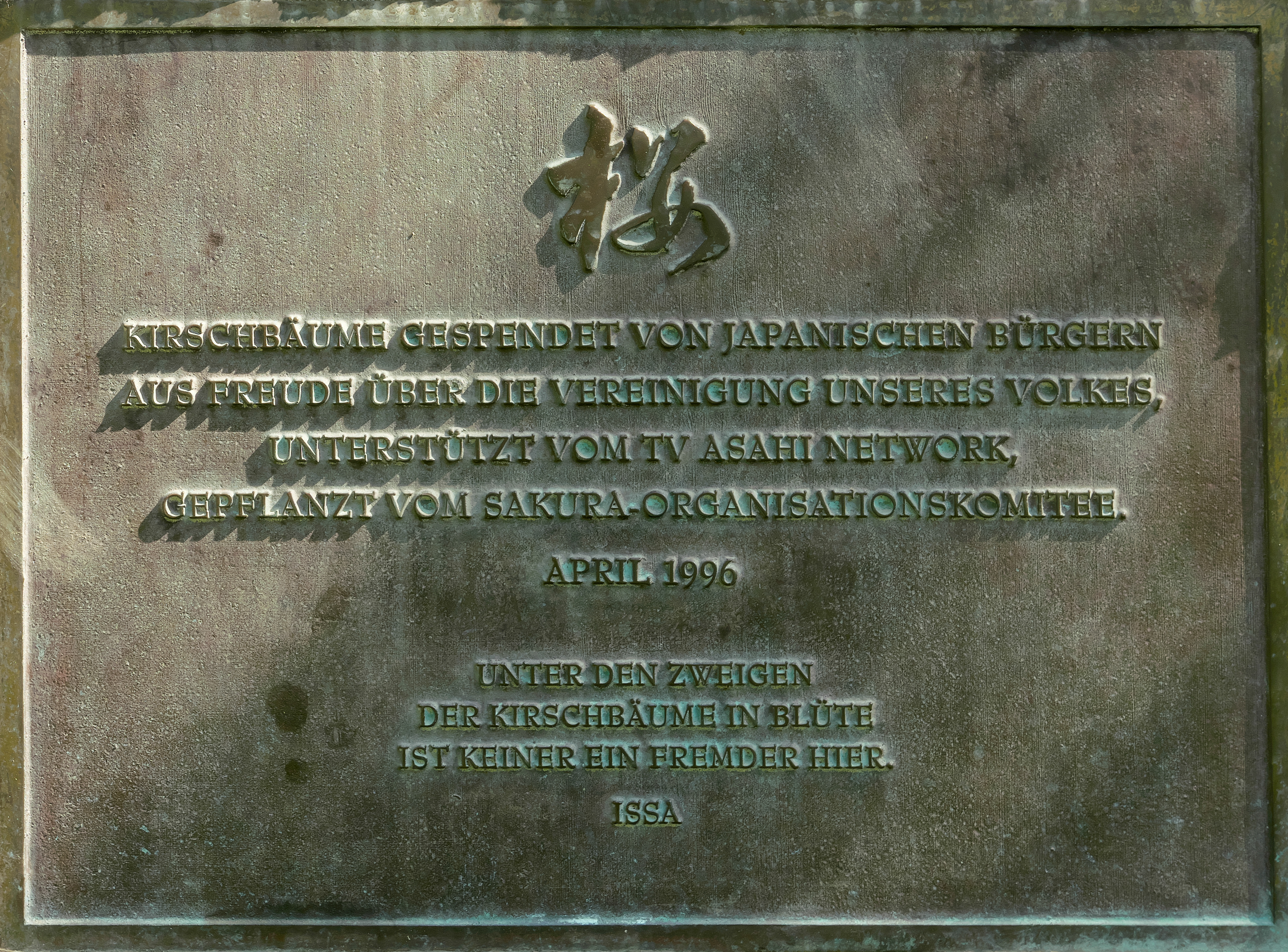
Bronze memorial plaque at Japaneck

=== German text ===
Kirschbäume gespendet von japanischen Bürgern
aus Freude über die Vereinigung unseres Volkes,
unterstützt vom TV Asahi Network,
gepflanzt vom Sakura-Organisationskomitee.
April 1996

Unter den Zweigen
der Kirschbäume in Blüte
ist keiner ein Fremder hier.

— Issa

=== English translation ===
Cherry trees donated by Japanese citizens
in joy for the unification of our people,
supported by TV Asahi Network,
planted by the Sakura Organizing Committee.
April 1996

Under the cherry blossoms
Strangers are not
Really strangers

— Issa

=== Original haiku in Japanese ===
花の陰
赤の他人は
なかりけり

— 小林 一茶
