= Khadija Mosque =

Mosque in Berlin, Germany

- Khadija-Moschee
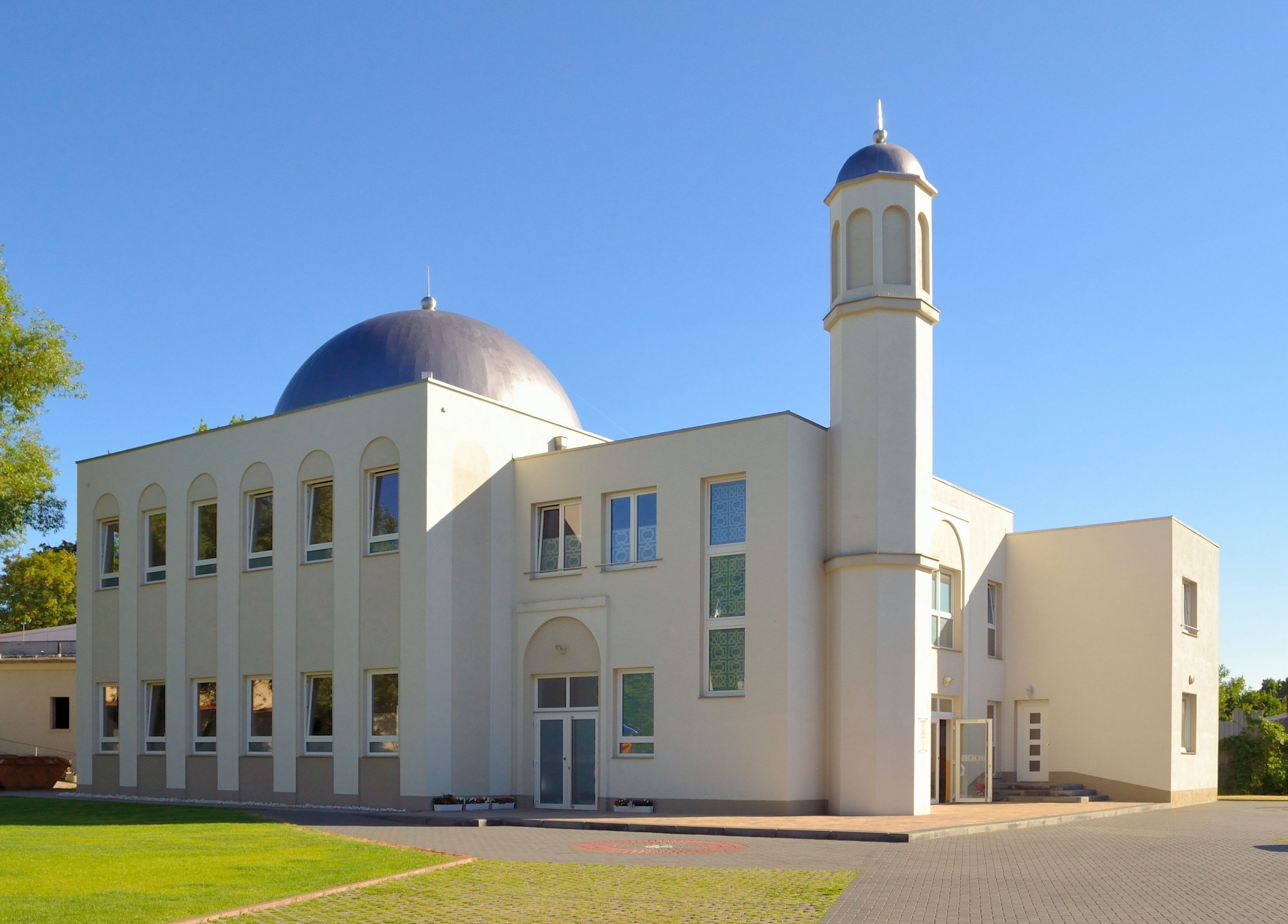
- The mosque in 2011

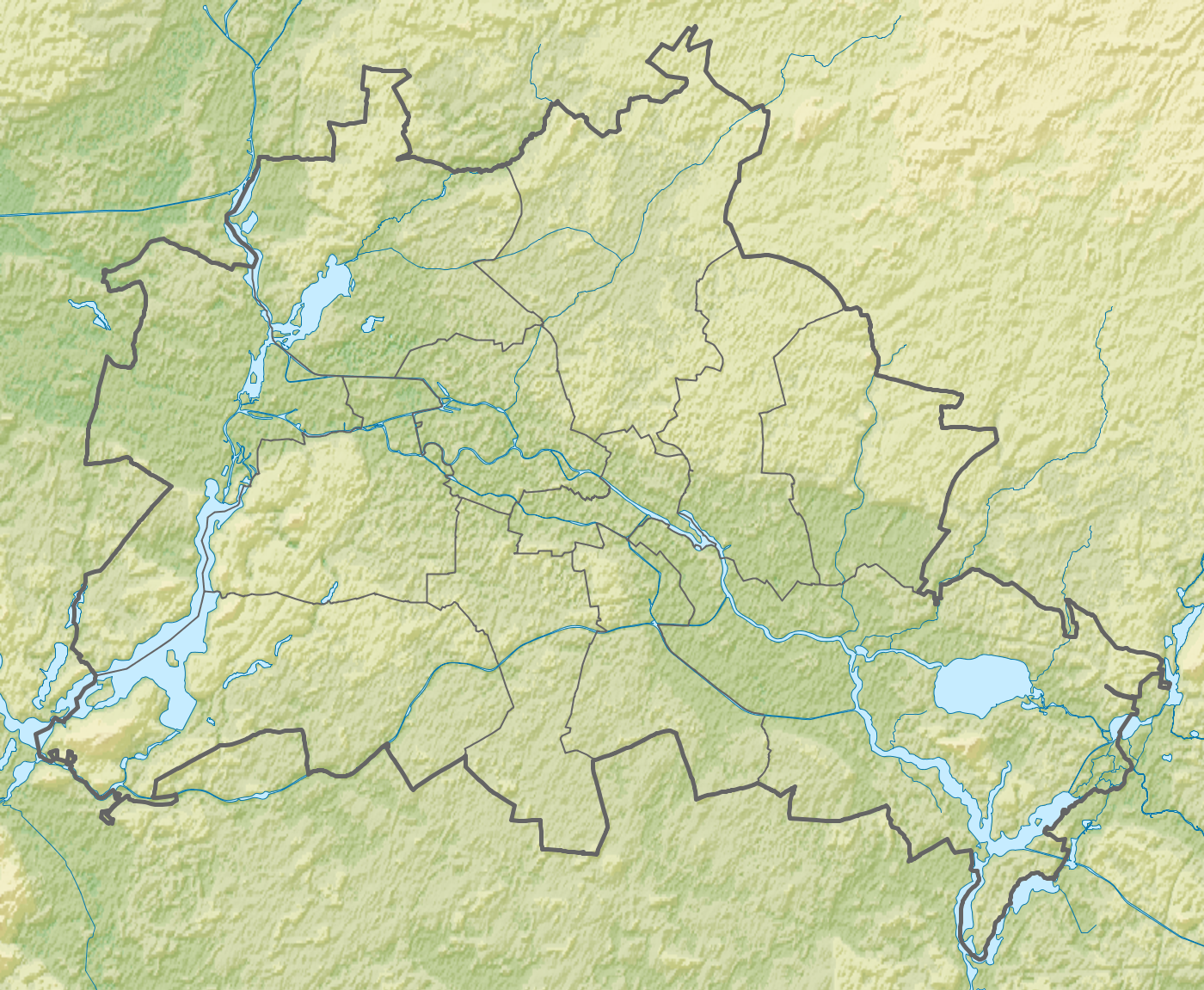
- Location of the mosque in Berlin

Religion
- Affiliation: Ahmadiyya Islam

Location
- Location: Heinersdorf, Berlin
- Country: Germany
- Interactive map of Khadija Mosque
- Coordinates: 52°34′22″N 13°25′51″E

Architecture
- Architect: Mubashra Ilyas
- Type: Mosque
- Style: Contemporary
- Completed: 2008
- Construction cost: c.€1.7 million

Specifications
- Capacity: 500 worshippers
- Dome: 1
- Dome height (outer): 4.5 m (15 ft)
- Dome dia. (outer): 9 m (30 ft)
- Minaret: 1
- Minaret height: 13 m (43 ft)

Website
- ahmadiyya.de/gebetsstaette/moscheen/berlin/

The Khadija Mosque (German: Khadija-Moschee; Arabic: مسجد خديجة) is a mosque located in Heinersdorf, Pankow, Berlin, Germany. Opened on 16 October 2008, it was the first mosque in former East Germany. The mosque is administered by the Ahmadiyya Muslim Jamaat Deutschland K.d.ö.R. (AMJ). The mosque has a 13-metre-high (43 ft) minaret and has capacity for 500 worshippers. The mosque was financed by funds collected by Ahmadiyya women and was designed by architect Mubashra Ilyas.

== History ==
The Ahmadiyya Muslim Jamaat tried to build their first European mosque in Berlin during the 1920s. According to the wish of the second Khalifa, the women of the community collected the funds for the mosque from their own resources. However, due to the financial crisis in Germany the plan was given up. Instead, the funds were used for the construction of the Fazl Mosque in London. Under the German Ahmadiyya community's 100-Mosques-Plan, the project was revived and a new mosque was planned in Berlin. The Khadija Mosque is the first mosque in the eastern part of Berlin.

== Construction ==
The foundation stone for the two storey mosque was laid on 2 January 2007 by the 5th Khalifa of the community, Mirza Masroor Ahmad. The mosque is built on a 4,790-square-metre (51,600 sq ft) site. There are two prayer rooms, for 250 women and 250 men each. The mosque was designed by Mubashra Ilyas, an architect within the Ahmadiyya community. The construction was overseen by the architect company Pakdel. The dome of the mosque is 4.5 metres (15 ft) high and has a diameter of 9 metres (30 ft). The minaret is 13 metres (43 ft) high. The construction cost of the mosque and a building for housing for the Imam and a "servant of the mosque" and offices were c.€1.7 million.

== See also ==
- Ahmadiyya in Germany
- Islam in Germany
- List of mosques in Germany
- List of Ahmadiyya buildings and structures in Germany
- Religion in Berlin
