= Leipzig-Dresden Railway =

Leipzig-Dresden Railway may refer to:

- Leipzig–Dresden Railway Company, a former railway company in Saxony, Germany
- Leipzig–Dresden railway, the first long-distance railway line in Germany, which was built by the Leipzig–Dresden Railway Company
