= LDE – Pegasus =

Passenger train tender locomotive

PEGASUS
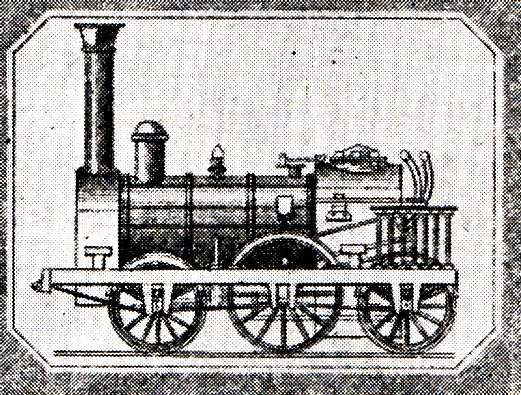
- LDE – PEGASUS
Type and origin
- Builder: Sächsische Maschinenbau-Compagnie, Chemnitz
- Build date: 1839
- Total produced: 1
Specifications
- Configuration
  - Whyte: 2-2-2
- Gauge: 1,435 mm (4 ft 8 1/2 in) standard gauge
- Driver dia.: 1,524 mm (5 ft 0 in)
- Wheelbase
  - Overall: 2,050 mm (6 ft 8 11/16 in)
- Boiler
- No. of heating tubes: 75
- Boiler pressure: 4 kgf/cm^{2} 3.9 bar; 390 kPa; 57 psi
- Heating surface
  - Firebox: 0.88 m^{2} (9.5 sq ft)
  - Evaporative: 35.5 m^{2} (382 sq ft)
- Cylinders: 2
- Cylinder size: 305 mm (1 ft 0 in)
- Piston stroke: 457 mm (1 ft 6 in)
Career
- Retired: 1862/63

The Pegasus was an early, passenger train tender locomotive operated by the Leipzig–Dresden Railway Company or LDE. She was one of the first locomotives to be built in Germany.

== History ==
The PEGASUS was built in 1839, the first locomotive to be built by the Sächsische Maschinenbau-Compagnie in Chemnitz. In 1842, after a long period of trials, she was bought by the Leipzig-Dresden Railway Compagnie for 6250 talers. The unusable locomotive COLUMBUS was used in part-payment. The design of the PEGASUS was based on the English locomotive STURM.

In 1862/63 the engine was retired from the LDE.

== See also ==
- Royal Saxon State Railways
- List of Saxon locomotives and railbuses
- Leipzig–Dresden Railway Company

== Sources ==
- Näbrich, Fritz; Meyer, Günter; Preuß, Reiner (1983). Lokomotivarchiv Sachsen 1 (in German). Berlin: Transpress VEB Verlag für Verkehrswesen.
- Näbrich, Fritz; Preuß, Reiner; Meyer, Günter (1984). Lokomotiven sächsischer Eisenbahnen, Schnellzug- und Personenzuglokomotiven (EFA 2.1) (in German). Düsseldorf: Alba. pp. 67, 194. ISBN 3-87094-096-4.
- Preuß, Erich; Preuß, Rainer (1991). Sächsische Staatseisenbahnen (in German). Berlin: Transpress Verlagsgesellschaft mbH. ISBN 3-344-70700-0.
- von Helmholtz, R.; Staby, W. (1930). Die Entwicklung der Lokomotive im Gebiete des Vereins Deutscher Eisenbahnverwaltungen, 1. Band, 1835 - 1880 (in German). Münich and Berlin: Verlag von R. Oldenburg.
