= Sören Benn =

German politician

Sören Benn (born 8 August 1968) is a German politician and was 'Bezirksbürgermeister' (district mayor) of the Berlin borough of Pankow between 2016 and 2023.

== Life and politics ==
Benn was born 1968 in the East German town of Kyritz and studied pedagogy. Benn entered the socialist Left Party in 2000 and became Bezirksbürgermeister of Pankow in 2016.
