= LDE – Elbe to Hayn =

LDE – ELBE to HAYN
Type and origin
- Builder: Borsig, Berlin
- Build date: 1848, 1849
- Total produced: 5
Specifications
- Configuration
  - Whyte: 2-2-2
- Gauge: 1,435 mm (4 ft 8 1/2 in)
- Driver dia.: 1,525 mm (60.0 in)
- Carrying wheel diameter: N.K.
- Service weight: N.K.
- Boiler
- No. of heating tubes: 120
- Boiler pressure: 5 bar (73 psi)
- Heating surface
  - Firebox: .7 m^{2} (7.5 sq ft)
  - Evaporative: 54 m^{2} (580 sq ft)
- Cylinders: 2
- Cylinder size: 331 mm (13.0 in)
- Piston stroke: 510 mm (20 in)
Career
- Retired: by 1869

The ELBE to HAYN series of early German steam locomotives were equipped with tenders and operated by the Leipzig–Dresden Railway Company (Leipzig-Dresdner Eisenbahn or LDE).

== History ==
The five locomotives were delivered to the LDE in 1848 and 1849 by Borsig of Berlin. They were given the names ELBE, BERLIN, MULDE, MEISSEN and HAYN.

The engines were retired in 1868/69.

== Technical features ==
The boiler was rivetted from several sections. The outer firebox was equipped with a semi-circular dome that extended forward over the boiler barrel and acted as a steam collection space. In addition there was a steam dome on the front section of the boiler. The two spring balance safety valves were located on the steam dome and dome of the outer firebox.

The steam cylinders were located externally, unlike those on English locomotives, which avoided the need for a cranked axle that would have been expensive and difficult to manufacture. The steam engine was equipped with inside Borsig double valve gear driven via two eccentric cams.

The locomotives did not have their own braking equipment. Braking could only be achieved using the hand-operated screw brake on the tender.

The locomotives had Kirchweger condensers to pre-heat the feedwater. An external feature of that is the second chimney on the tender. Exhaust steam was led from the steam chest to the tender through a low-down, 100 mm, connecting pipe.

== See also ==
- Royal Saxon State Railways
- List of Saxon locomotives and railbuses
- Leipzig–Dresden Railway Company

== Sources ==
- Näbrich, Fritz; Meyer, Günter; Preuß, Reiner (1983). Lokomotivarchiv Sachsen 1 (in German). Berlin: transpress VEB Verlag für Verkehrswesen.
- Näbrich, Fritz; Preuß, Reiner; Meyer, Günter (1984). Lokomotiven sächsischer Eisenbahnen, Schnellzug- und Personenzuglokomotiven (EFA 2.1) (in German). Düsseldorf: Alba. pp. 73–74, 196. ISBN 3-87094-096-4.
- Preuß, Erich; Preuß, Rainer (1991). Sächsische Staatseisenbahnen (in German). Berlin: transpress Verlagsgesellschaft mbH. ISBN 3-344-70700-0.
