= Karpfenteich =

Lake in Pankow, Berlin, Germany

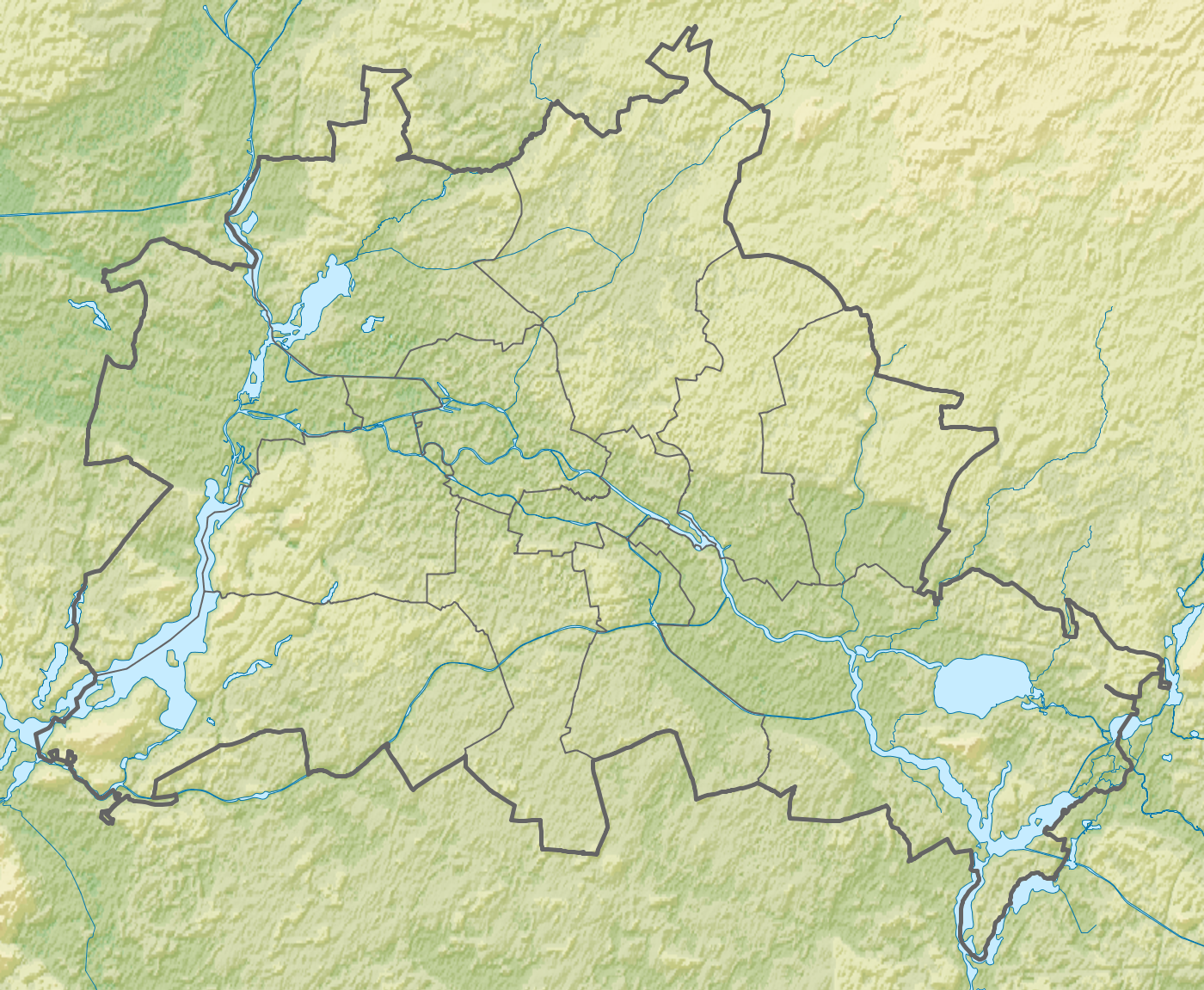
- Location within Berlin
- Location: Pankow, Berlin
- Coordinates: 52°38′8″N 13°27′53″E
- Basin countries: Germany
- Settlements: Berlin-Buch

Karpfenteich is a lake in Pankow, Berlin, Germany.
