= Johann Andreas Schubert =

German railway pioneer (1808–1870)

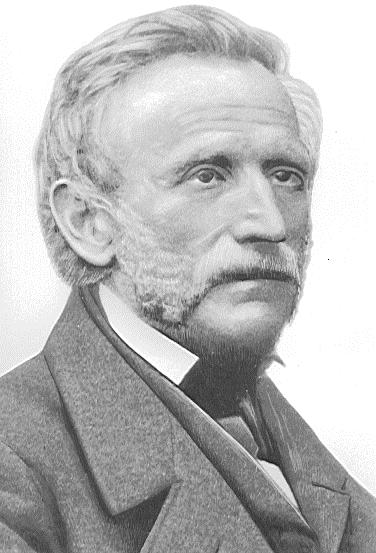
Johann Andreas Schubert

Johann-Andreas Schubert (19 March 1808 – 6 October 1870) was a German general engineer (Universalingenieur), designer and university lecturer.

== Life ==
Schubert was born on 19 March 1808 in Wernesgrün (Vogtland) in the Kingdom of Saxony in Germany. He was the son of a day labourer (Tagelöhner) and was brought up by foster parents, who enabled him to have a sound education at the St Thomas School in Leipzig, at the garrison school at Königstein Fortress and at the Freemasons Institute in Dresden's Friedrichstadt.

He studied civil and structural engineering (architecture) at the architecture school in the academy of Fine Arts in Dresden and in 1828 (at the age of 20 ) was given a post as a lecturer with the recently founded Royal Institute for Technical Education (Königlich-Technischen Bildungsanstalt Dresden or TBD) in Dresden, the forerunner of the Dresden University of Technology.

On 28 April 1832 Schubert was hired as a senior professor (Prädikat Professor). He was the first lecturer in mathematical and technical sciences at the TBD and at the same time lecturer in mathematical sciences at the architecture school of the Dresden Academy of Fine Arts.

In 1836 the Maschinenbauanstalt Übigau was founded and Schubert became its technical director and chairman of the board. That same year he was a co-founder of the Saxon Elbe Steamship Company (Sächsische Elbe-Dampfschiffahrts-Gesellschaft).

In 1837 the first steamship on the Upper Elbe, the Königin Maria, was built and one year later the steamer, Prinz Albert, followed – both were designed by Schubert.

In April 1838 Schubert quit his contract with the mechanical engineering company and became a university lecturer again.

On 8 April 1839 at the opening of the first German long-distance railway between Leipzig and Dresden, Schubert drove the Saxonia, the first effective, working, steam locomotive in Germany, which he had designed. He drove behind the official train which was hauled by two English locomotives.

On 31 May 1845 the foundation stone for the Göltzsch Viaduct, designed again by Schubert, was laid. Schubert made the attempt, for the first time in Germany, to base the design of railway bridges on theoretical calculations. With over 26 million bricks, the Göltzsch Viaduct is the largest brick bridge in the world. It is 574 m long, 78 m high and has 81 arches. Opened on 15 July 1851, it is still standing today, only minor maintenance being needed to enable it to cope with the loading of modern-day railway traffic.

In 1866 Johann-Andreas Schubert resigned from his university posts. On 6 October 1870 he died in Dresden. His grave is located in the Evangelical Cemetery of St Matthew's Church (Matthäuskirche) in Friedrichstrasse.

== Honours ==
- In his memory, one of the buildings at the University of Technology in Dresden's Südvorstadt district bears the name Andreas-Schubert-Bau.
- On the occasion of his 200th birthday in July 2008, the university organised an academic exhibition and a Schubert open day.
- Both in 1985 and in 2008 stamps appeared in honour of Schuberts and his achievements.
- On his house of birth in Wernesgrün he is commemorated by a memorial tablet.

== See also ==
- List of railway pioneers

== Sources ==
- de:Johann Andreas Schubert
- Manfred Bachmann (ed.): Prof. Johann Andreas Schubert - Wissenschaftler und Konstrukteur. In: Kleine Chronik großer Meister - Erzgebirger, auf die wir stolz sind. Teil 1, Druckerei und Verlag Mike Rockstroh, Aue 2000, p. 43-46
- Thomas Hänseroth, Klaus Mauersberger (2007). "Schubert, Andreas". Neue Deutsche Biographie (in German). Vol. 23. Berlin: Duncker & Humblot. pp. 606–607.
