= Sakura Campaign =

Cherry tree planting drive

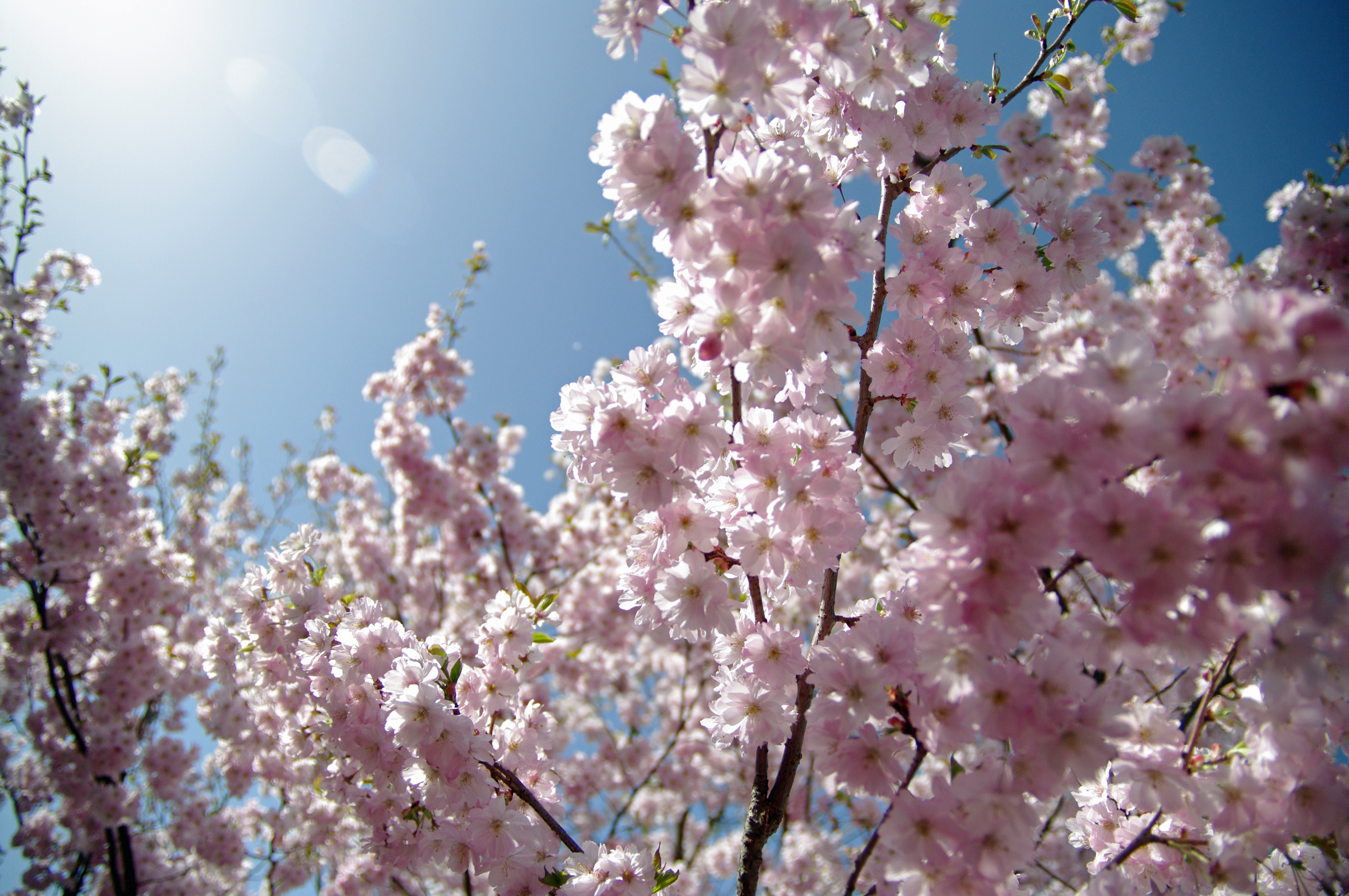
Japanese cherry blossoms in Gärten der Welt in Berlin-Marzahn

The Sakura Campaign was a cherry tree planting drive organised by the Japanese TV station Asahi in 1990 to celebrate German reunification. The campaign planted 10,000 Japanese cherries in Berlin and Brandenburg between 1990 and 2010.

There is a memorial stone to this initiative at Japaneck.
