= Maschinenbauanstalt Übigau =

Former German engineering firm in Dresden, Germany

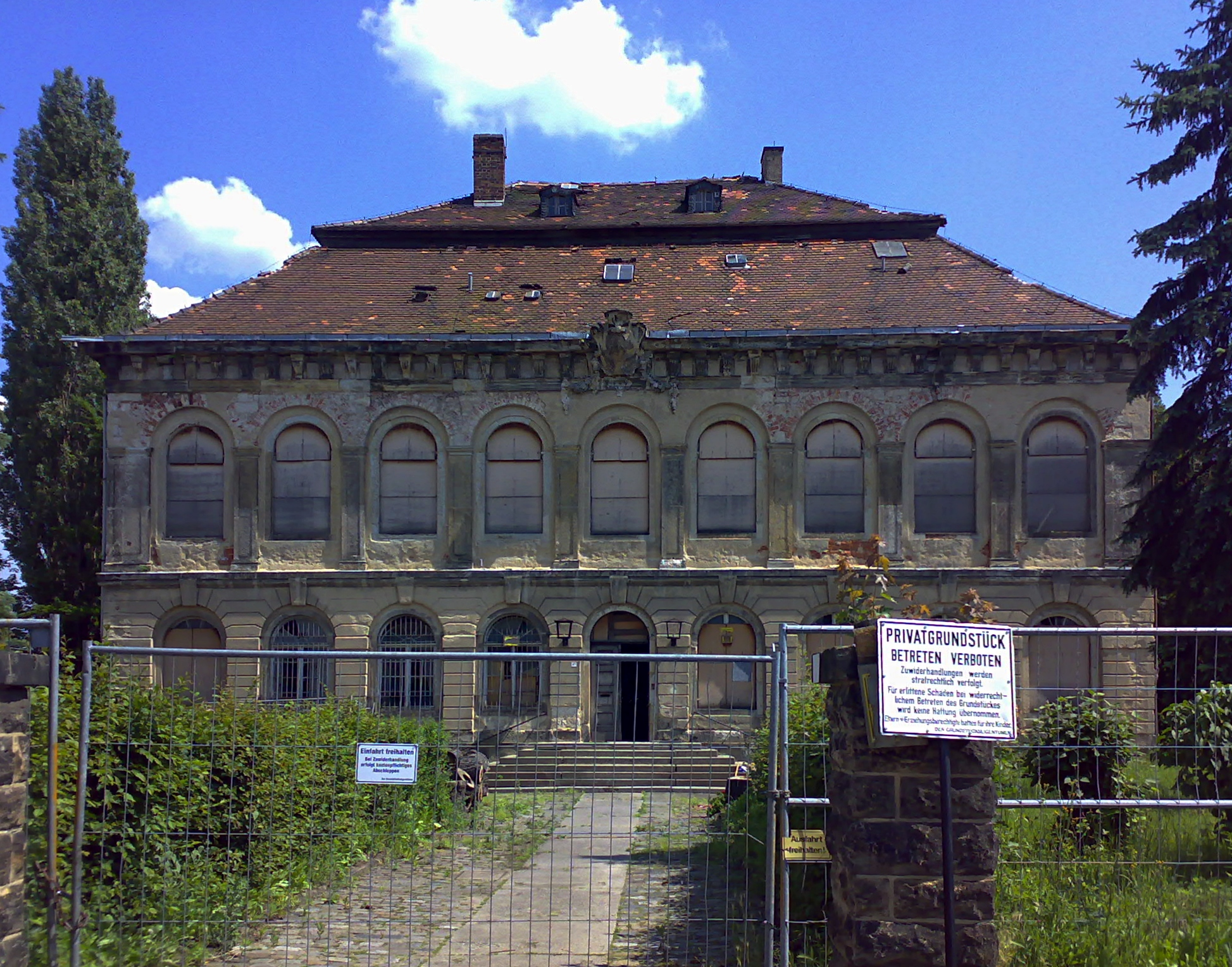
Übigau House, formerly used as the headquarters

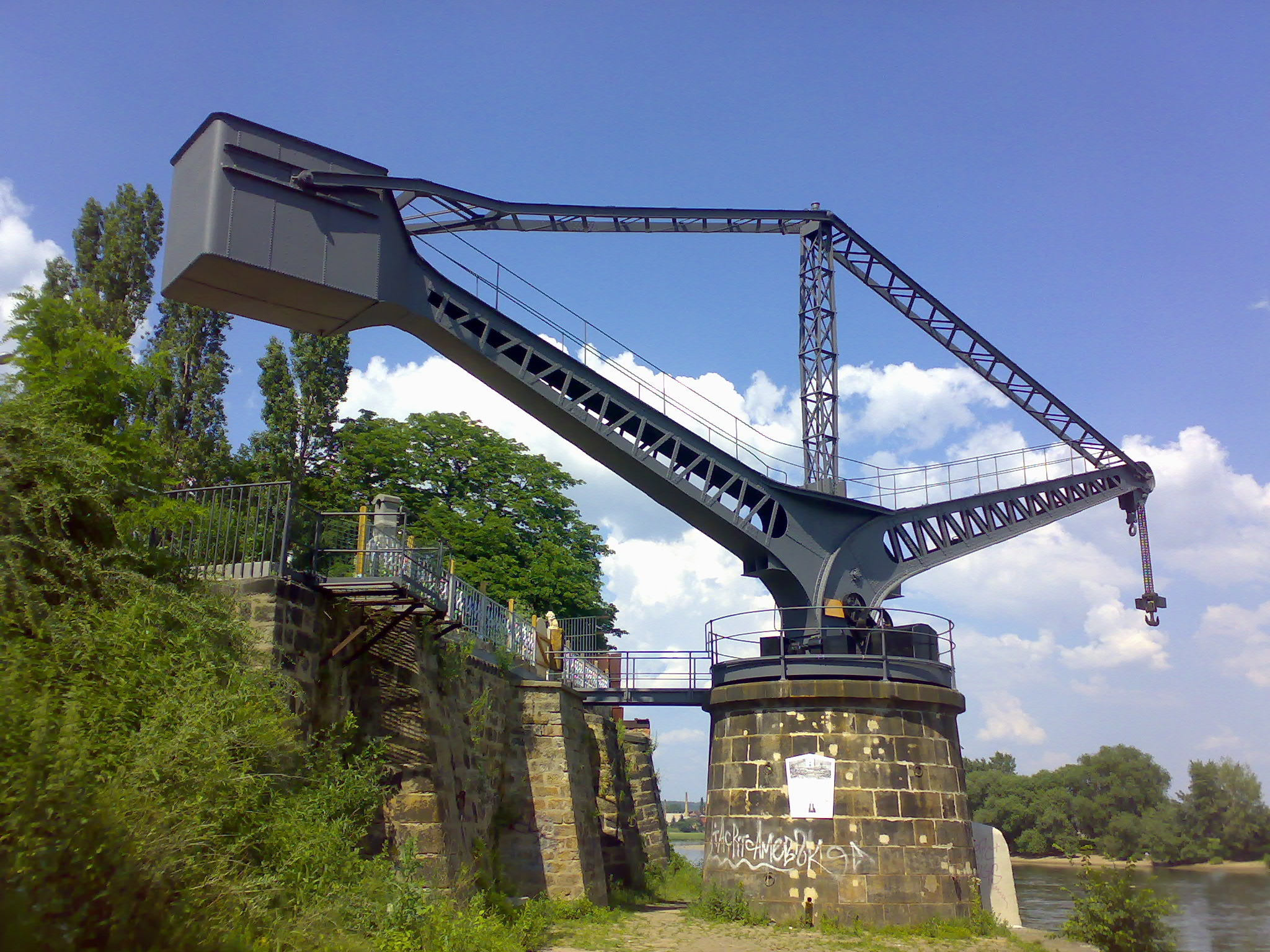
Shipping crane

The Maschinenbauanstalt Übigau, full name Dresdener Actien-Maschinenbau-Verein, Maschinenbau-Anstalt Uebigau, was a German engineering firm based in the present-day district of Übigau in the city of Dresden, Germany.

== History ==
In June 1836 the Dresden Engineering Society (Dresdener Actien-Maschinenbau-Verein) was formed and, that same year, founded the Maschinenba-Anstalt Übigau which opened on 1 January 1837. A significant part was played by Johann Andreas Schubert, engineer and professor at the Royal Dresden Institute of Technology, who subsequently acted as technical director and chairman of the board. Among the employees of the company was Christian Johann Heinrich Schmidt who later became Saxony's first locomotive driver. The site of the engineering firm was Übigau House (Schloss Übigau) and the land immediately to the north, towards Altübigau. In 1836, ownership of the house was transferred to the engineering firm who used it to house their management offices and construction rooms. The production sites were adjacent to the north.

The engineering works was founded to realize some of Schubert's projects. One of them was the construction of the first German steam locomotive, the Saxonia, for the Leipzig and Dresden railway. In 1837, Schubert also designed the drive for the Königin Maria, one of the first steamships on the Upper Elbe. In April 1838, however, he left the company to devote himself to his teaching position. Since there was neither an official construction contract nor sufficient technical experience, production of the Saxonia posed a high risk for the company. Mainly due to a lack of orders, the economic situation of the firm remained tense in the period that followed. On 15 June 1841, it was decided to close the factory. The Dresden Engineering Society offered it for private sale in July 1841.

In 1863 the Schlick'sche shipyard emerged here, a company that from 1877 as Kette A.G. became the most important German inland shipyard for barges and passenger ships. In 1892 it was joined by the shipbuilding research department of TU Dresden and by 1920 the Dresdner Maschinenfabrik und Schiffswerft Übigau had 1,500 employees. Apart from ships it also made boilers, large engines and dredgers. By 1930, when it had to close for 5 years as a result of the worldwide economic crisis, it had delivered 1,400 ships from its slipways to places as far away as Africa and South America.

In 1945 the firm was totally destroyed; it later reformed as VEB Dampfkesselbau Übigau, building boiler systems for large ships until the 1990s, and vehicle cranes as well from its privatisation in 1990 until its insolvency in 2001 . The yard had its own shipping berth with 48 steamers and cargo ships.
