= LDE – Columbus =

COLUMBUS
Type and origin
- Builder: Gillingham & Winans, Baltimore
- Build date: 1835
- Total produced: 1
Specifications
- Configuration
  - Whyte: 0-4-0
- Gauge: 1,435 mm (4 ft 8 1/2 in)
- Driver dia.: 1,220 mm (4 ft 0 in)
- Boiler
- No. of heating tubes: 400
- Heating tube length: 965 mm (38 in)
- Boiler pressure: 4.9 kgf/cm^{2} (480 kPa; 70 psi)
- Cylinders: 2
- Cylinder size: 254 mm (10 in)
- Piston stroke: 610 mm (24 in)
Career
- Retired: 1842

Columbus was a tender locomotive operated by the Leipzig–Dresden Railway Company (Leipzig-Dresdner Eisenbahn or LDE).

== History ==
The locomotive was sent to the LDE on the recommendation of the Saxon consul in the United States. Similar locomotives had already proven themselves on the Baltimore and Ohio Railroad. (cf. Tom Thumb) She was built in 1835 by Gillingham & Winans in Baltimore/USA.

In the LDE's company records the locomotive was later described as unreliable and unusable. Several attempts to give the engine back to the manufacturer failed.

In 1842 the locomotive was given to the Sächsische Maschinenbau-Compagnie in Chemnitz in payment for the PEGASUS. Beyond that, her fate is unknown. She may be identical with the TEUTONIA, which was delivered to the Magdeburg-Leipzig Railway in 1843.

== See also ==
- Royal Saxon State Railways
- List of Saxon locomotives and railbuses
- Leipzig–Dresden Railway Company

== Sources ==
- Näbrich, Fritz; Meyer, Günter; Preuß, Reiner (1983). Lokomotivarchiv Sachsen 1 (in German). Berlin: Transpress VEB Verlag für Verkehrswesen.
- Näbrich, Fritz; Preuß, Reiner; Meyer, Günter (1984). Lokomotiven sächsischer Eisenbahnen, Schnellzug- und Personenzuglokomotiven (EFA 2.1) (in German). Düsseldorf: Alba. pp. 60, 190. ISBN 3-87094-096-4.
- Preuß, Erich; Preuß, Rainer (1991). Sächsische Staatseisenbahnen (in German). Berlin: Transpress Verlagsgesellschaft mbH. ISBN 3-344-70700-0.
- von Helmholtz, R.; Staby, W. (1930). Die Entwicklung der Lokomotive im Gebiete des Vereins Deutscher Eisenbahnverwaltungen, 1. Band, 1835 - 1880 (in German). Münich and Berlin: Verlag von R. Oldenburg.
