= LDE – Renner to Greif =

LDE - RENNER to GREIF
Type and origin
- Builder: Thomas Kirtley & Co., Warrington
- Build date: 1837–1839
- Total produced: 5
Specifications
- Configuration
  - Whyte: 2-2-2
- Gauge: 1,435 mm (4 ft 8 1/2 in) standard gauge
- Driver dia.: 1,524 mm (5 ft 0 in)
- Carrying wheel diameter: 1,067 mm (3 ft 6 in)
- Empty weight: 8.75 tonnes 8.61 long tons; 9.65 short tons
- Boiler
- No. of heating tubes: 96
- Heating tube length: 2,080 mm (6 ft 10 in)
- Boiler pressure: 4 kg/cm^{2} 3.9 bar; 390 kPa; 57 psi
- Heating surface
  - Firebox: 0.76 m^{2} (8.2 sq ft)
  - Radiative: 5.5 m^{2} (59 sq ft)
  - Evaporative: 31.0 m^{2} (334 sq ft)
- Cylinders: 2
- Cylinder size: 292 mm (11 1/2 in)
- Piston stroke: 457 mm (18 in)
Career
- Retired: by 1858

The German locomotive series Renner to Greif comprised passenger train, tender locomotives operated by the Leipzig–Dresden Railway Company (LDE).

== History ==
The five locomotives were delivered in 1837 and 1839 by Thomas Kirtley & Co., Warrington, Lancashire to the LDE. They were given the names: RENNER, STURM, ELEPHANT, WILLIAM CURTLEY and GREIF.

These locomotives were retired between 1851 and 1858.

== See also ==
- Royal Saxon State Railways
- List of Saxon locomotives and railbuses
- Leipzig–Dresden Railway Company

== Sources ==
- Näbrich, Fritz; Meyer, Günter; Preuß, Reiner (1983). Lokomotivarchiv Sachsen 1 (in German). Berlin: transpress VEB Verlag für Verkehrswesen.
- Näbrich, Fritz; Preuß, Reiner; Meyer, Günter (1984). Lokomotiven sächsischer Eisenbahnen, Schnellzug- und Personenzuglokomotiven (EFA 2.1) (in German). Düsseldorf: Alba. ISBN 3-87094-096-4.
- Preuß, Erich; Preuß, Rainer (1991). Sächsische Staatseisenbahnen (in German). Berlin: transpress Verlagsgesellschaft mbH. ISBN 3-344-70700-0.
