= Heinersdorf =

- Quarter of Berlin
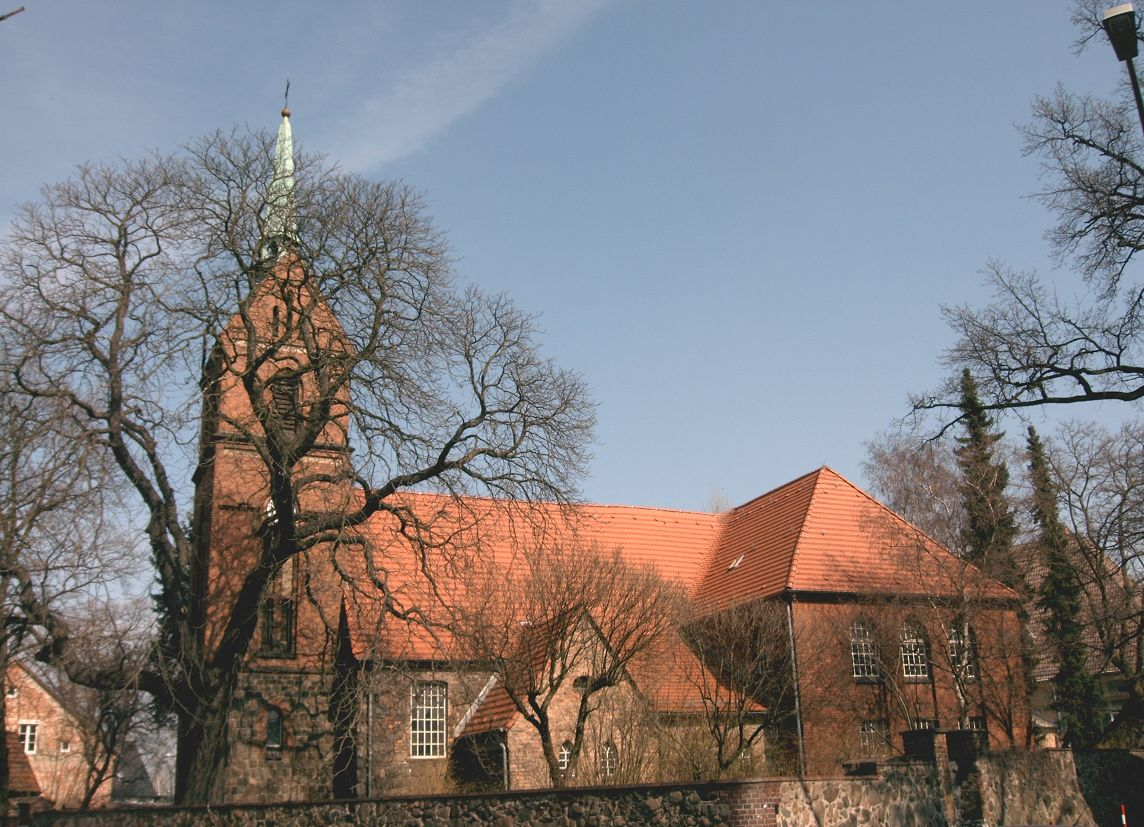
- Heinersdorf Church

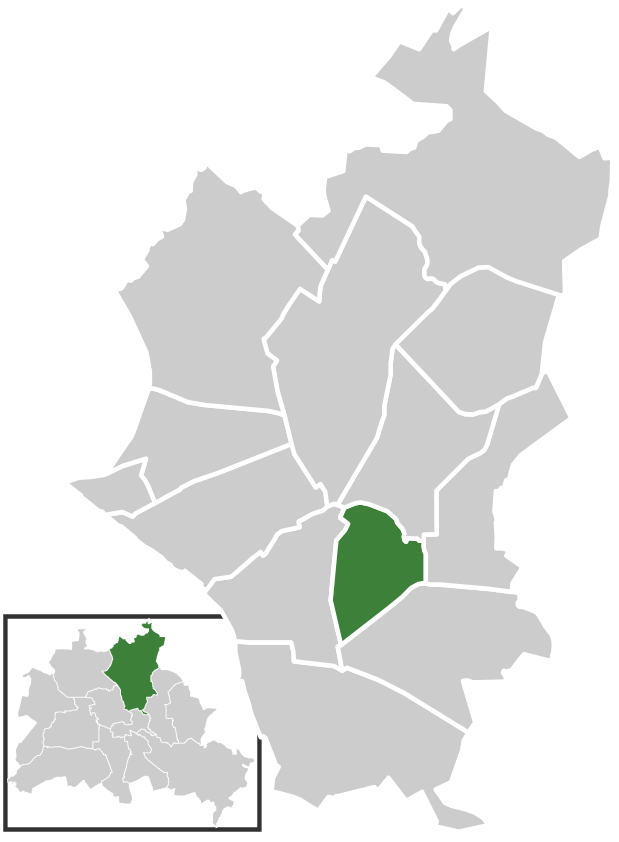
- Location of Heinersdorf in Pankow district and Berlin
- Interactive map of Heinersdorf
- Location within Germany Location within Berlin
- Coordinates: 52°34′01″N 13°26′24″E
- Country: Germany
- State: Berlin
- City: Berlin
- Borough: Pankow
- Founded: 1319

Area
  - Total: 3.95 km^{2} (1.53 sq mi)
- Elevation: 90 m (300 ft)

Population (2024-12-31)
  - Total: 9,557
  - Density: 2,420/km^{2} (6,270/sq mi)
- Time zone: UTC+01:00 (CET)
  - Summer (DST): UTC+02:00 (CEST)
- Postal codes: 13089
- Vehicle registration: B

Heinersdorf (German pronunciation: [ˈhaɪnɐsdɔʁf]) is a locality in the borough of Pankow in Berlin, Germany. It is located close to the centre of Pankow.

== History ==
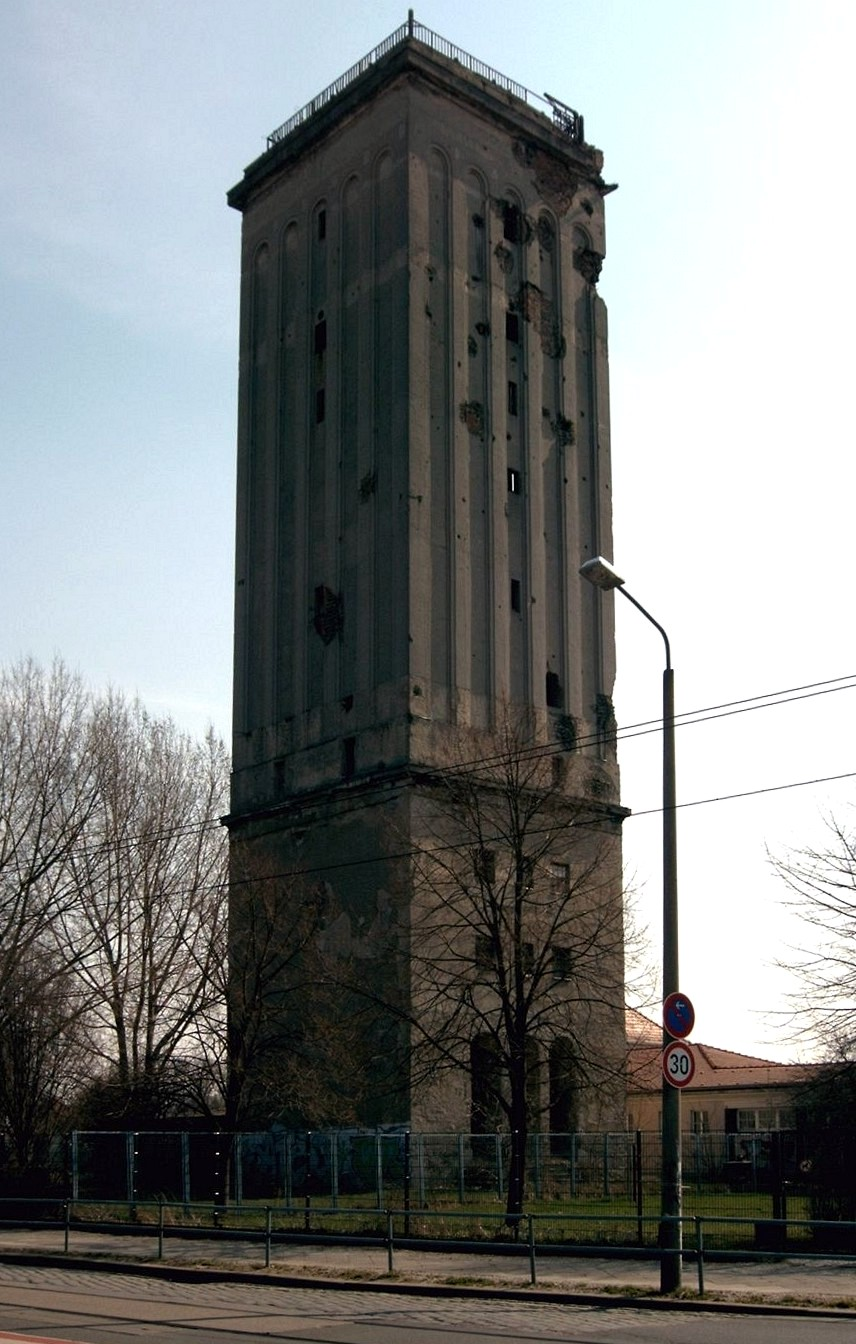
Water tower

Heinersdorf was first mentioned in a 1319 document when it was sold by Margrave Waldemar of Brandenburg to the Hospital of the Holy Ghost in Berlin. After that it changed owners several times.

In 1920 it was incorporated into Greater Berlin and belonged to the former Pankow borough, until it merged with Karow, Blankenburg and Weissensee in 1985. These localities belonged to Pankow again after Berlin's 2001 administrative reform.

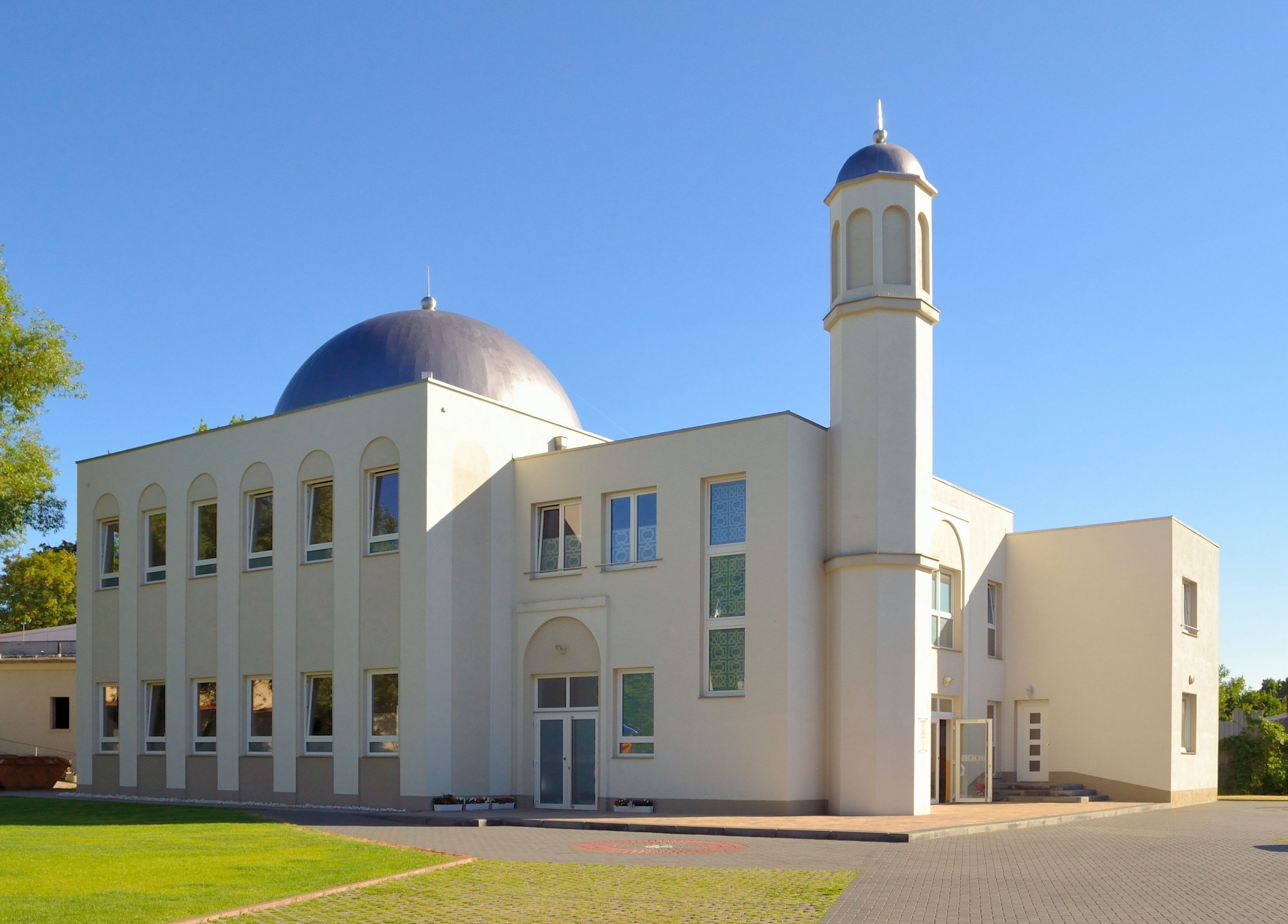
Khadija Mosque

The foundations of the fieldstone church were laid around 1300. The church features two stained glass windows from 1946 by Charles Crodel. Another landmark is the Heinersdorf water tower, which was erected in 1910. Originally part of a planned town hall that was never built, it later served as a Flak tower and as a listening station of the Red Army. Since 1991 the building has been abandoned.

Heinerdorf was often in the media during 2008 due to controversy around the establishment of the Khadija Mosque by the Ahmadiyya Muslim Community.

== Transportation ==
Heinersdorf is served by the Berlin S-Bahn lines S2 and S8 at the Pankow-Heinersdorf station. A tramway connection to the inner city is provided by the M2 line of the Berlin Straßenbahn.

The federal highway (Bundesstraße) 109 running along the street Prenzlauer Promemade to the A114 Autobahnzubringer Prenzlau motorway marks Heinersdorf's western border.
