= Rona Tietje =

German politician (born 1981)

Member of the Berlin House of Representatives
- Incumbent
- Assumed office 29 October 2026
- Constituency: Pankow

Personal details
- Born: 7 October 1981 (age 44)
- Party: Social Democratic Party

Rona Tietje (born 7 October 1981) is a German politician who was elected member of the Berlin House of Representatives in 2026. She has served as co-chair of the Social Democratic Party in Pankow since 2020.
