= Leipzig–Dresden Railway Company =

Early German railway in Saxony (1839–1876)

The Leipzig–Dresden Railway Company (German: Leipzig-Dresdner Eisenbahn-Compagnie or LDE) was a private railway company in the Kingdom of Saxony, now a part of Germany. Amongst other things, it operated the route between Leipzig and Dresden, opened in 1839, and which was the first long-distance railway line in Germany. On 1 July 1876 the company was nationalised and became part of the Royal Saxon State Railways.

== History ==
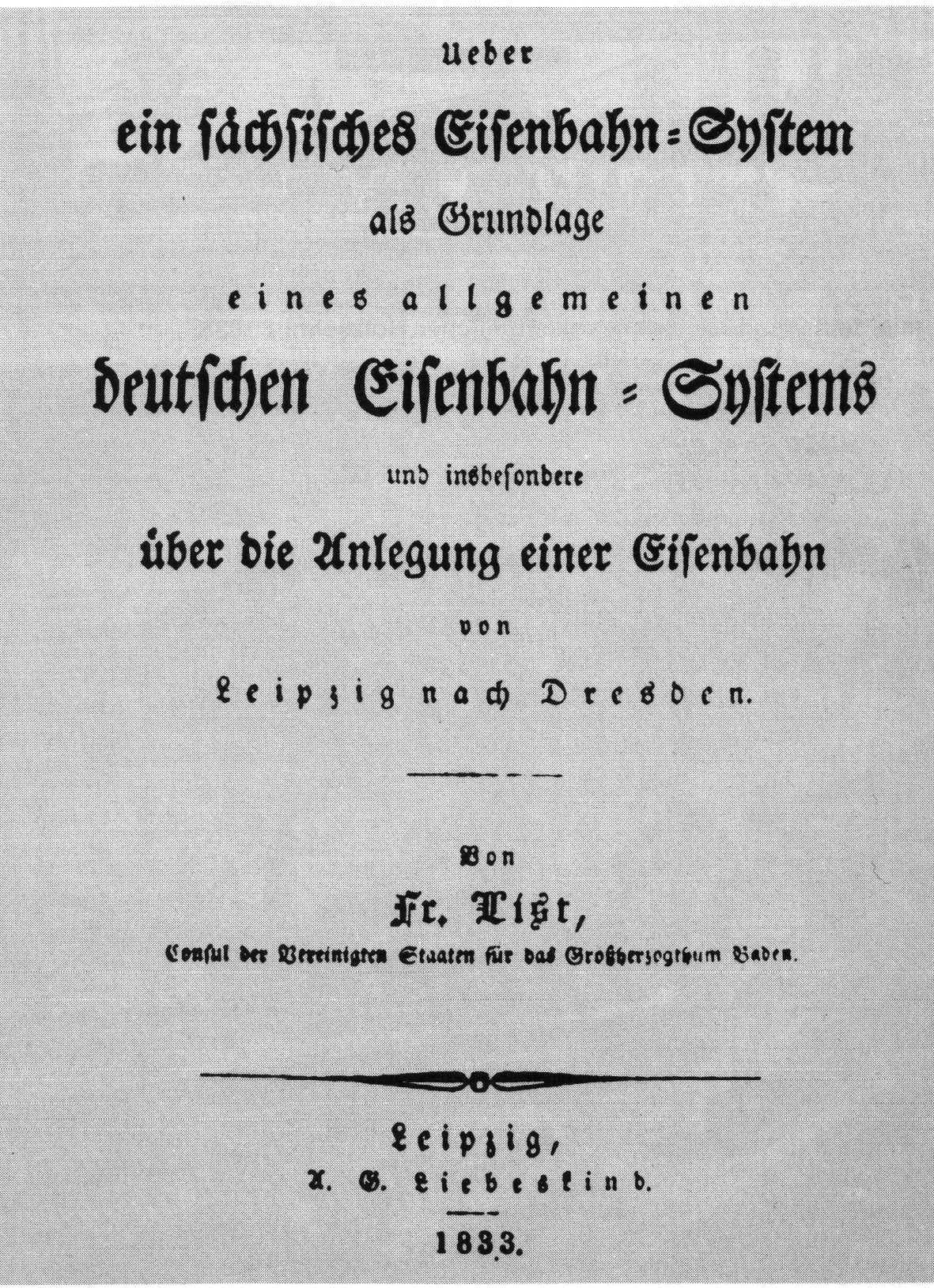
Title page of List's paper About a Saxon railway system as the basis of a general German railway system and especially about the routing of a railway from Leipzig to Dresden, Leipzig 1833

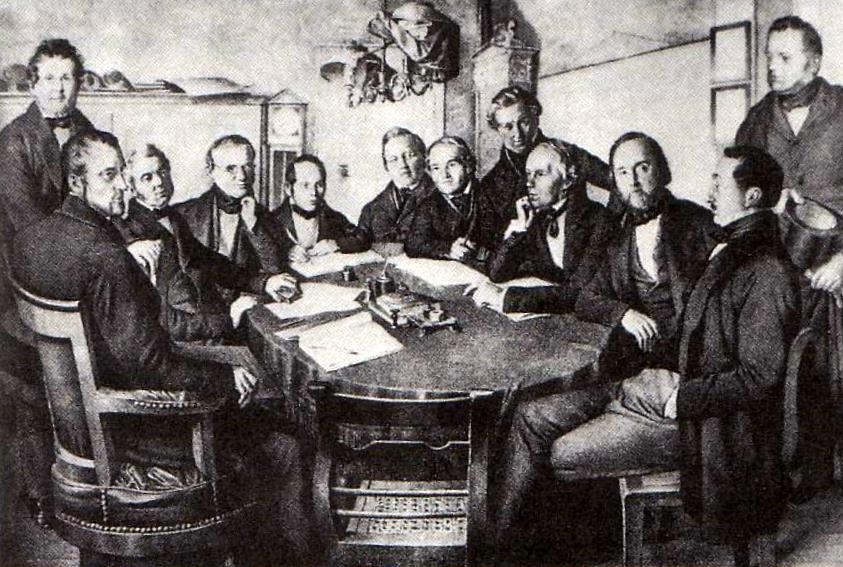
The board of directors of the Leipzig–Dresden Railway Company in 1852; from l to r: Busse (plenipotentiary), Fleischer (deputy), Haberstadt (deputy), Einert (member), Gessler (secretary to the board), Erdmann (member), Hirzel (member), Lampe (deputy), Harkort (chairman), Dufour-Feronce (member), Seyfferth (deputy), Preusser (deputy) (photo of 1852)

The idea of building a railway to link Leipzig with Strehla (on the river Elbe), had already been put forward before 1830 by the Leipzig merchant, Carl Gottlieb Tenner. Tenner's idea gained new impetus after the state economist in Leipzig, Friedrich List, publicised his plans for a German railway system in 1833, in which it was envisaged that Leipzig would function as a central hub. That same year, a railway committee was founded which, on 20 November 1833, submitted a petition to the lower house of the Saxon Parliament (Sächsischer Landtag) in Dresden for the construction of a railway from Leipzig to Dresden .

In 1835, the Leipzig–Dresden Railway Company was founded as a private company by twelve citizens of Leipzig, including: Albert Dufour-Féronce (1798–1861), Gustav Harkort (1795–1865), Carl Lampe (1804–1889) and Wilhelm Theodor Seyfferth (1807–1881). At the Easter trade fair in 1835 the shares of the company (nominally valued at 100 thaler) were fully subscribed within just a few hours, making a capital sum of over one million thalers available. On 6 May 1835 the Saxon state government authorised the construction and operation of the line as well as the issue of non-interest bearing bonds to the value of 500,000 thalers. The total capital generated thus amounted to 1.5 million thalers.

In October 1835 the British engineers Sir James Walker and Hawkshaw surveyed the proposed routes and recommended the northern route via Strehla (estimated cost: 1,808,500 thalers) over the route via Meißen (1,956,000 thalers). On 16 November 1835 the purchase of land began for the section between Leipzig and the Mulde bridge north of Wurzen. On 1 March 1836 the first sod was cut. Oversight for the entire project lay in the hands of the Saxon Senior Waterways Construction Engineer (Oberwasserbaudirektors), Karl Theodor Kunz. Then however the town council of Strehla rejected the building of the railway. So the line was re-routed over the river Elbe 7 km further south at Riesa. On 7 April 1839 the first train ran over the Elbe railway bridge at Riesa.

The route was taken into operation in several stages:

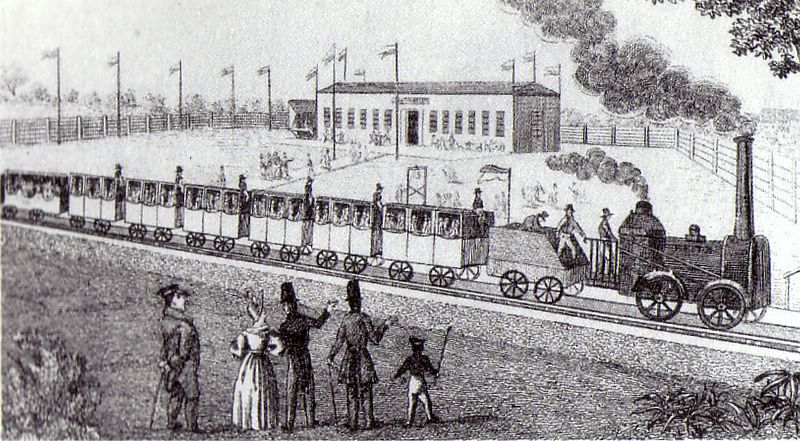
Temporary station restaurant at Althen with departing steam engine, around 1837

- 1837, 24 April: Leipzig–Althen (10.60 km)
- 1837, 12 November: Althen–Borsdorf–Gerichshain (4.32 km)
- 1838, 11 May: Gerichshain–Machern (2.93 km)
- 1838, 19 July: Weintraube–Dresden (8.18 km)
- 1838, 31 July: Machern–Wurzen (8.00 km)
- 1838, 16 September: Wurzen–Dahlen (17.53 km)
- 1838, 16 September: Oberau–Coswig–Weintraube (13.44 km)
- 1838, 3 November: Dahlen–Oschatz (9.56 km)
- 1838, 21 November: Oschatz–Riesa (13.07 km)
- 1839, 7 April: Riesa–Oberau (28.45 km)

On 7 April 1839, on the completion of the Elbe bridge at Riesa, the entire route from Leipzig to Dresden was finally opened. A second track was built immediately afterwards and the route was then operated with traffic running on the left, in line with English practice until 1884.

From 1851 to 1878 a single-tracked, 5 km long, connecting railway was operated in Leipzig, that branched off from the Saxon-Bavarian Railway, ran eastwards around the city in a large curve and finally entered the Dresden railway north of Dresden station.

On 1 December 1860 the Leipzig-Dresden Railway opened a side line that branched off the main line in Coswig and ran to Meißen. On 14 May 1866 it opened services on another side line, which branched off the main route in Borsdorf and initially ran as far as Grimma; then on 28 October 1867 to Leisnig, on 2 June 1868 to Döbeln, on 25 October 1868 to Nossen and on 22 December 1868 it was finally extended as far as Meißen, so that a parallel southern route was established between Borsdorf and Coswig.

The Großenhain branch, opened on 14 October 1862, went into the ownership of the LDE on 1 July 1869.

On 15 October 1875 the LDE opened a connecting route from Riesa to Elsterwerda (since 1815 part of the Kingdom of Prussia), that from 17 July 1875 was linked to Berlin and Dresden.

The route from Nossen to Freiberg – as part of the line from Nossen to Moldau - was completed on 15 July 1873, and extended as far as Mulda/Sa. by 2 November 1875. On 15 August 1876 the route reached the Bohemian border at Moldau.

After the collapse of the Elbe bridge at Riesa, the general assembly of the shareholders decided on 29 March 1876 to sell the Dresden railway to the state of Saxony. On 1 July 1876 the operation and management of the Leipzig-Dresden Railway was transferred to the Royal Saxon State Railways.

The 'railway monument' in Leipzig, erected in 1878, commemorates the development of the Dresden railway from its emergence as a private initiative of Leipzig citizens to its nationalisation.

== The routes ==
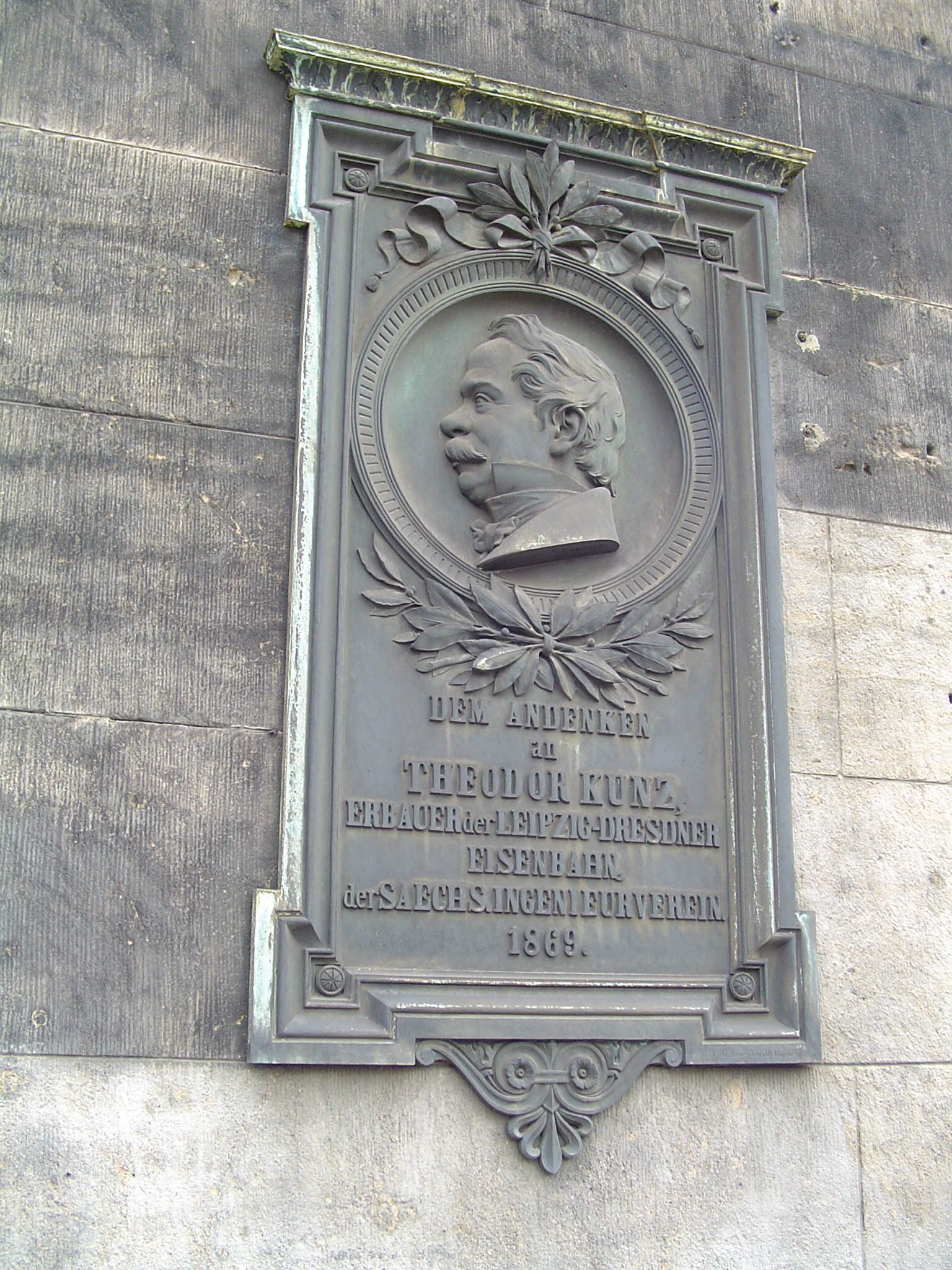
Memorial tablet for Theodor Kunz at Dresden-Neustadt station

- Leipzig–Dresden (*1839)
- Leipzig Bavarian station–Leipzig Dresden station (1851–1878)
- Borsdorf–Coswig (*1860/1868)
- Priestewitz–Großenhain (procured in 1868)
- Riesa–Elsterwerda (*1875)
- Nossen–Freiberg–Moldau (*1876)

== The locomotives ==
The following list is incomplete:

Lokomotives of the Leipzig–Dresden Railway Company
LDE-Designation	Quantity	Manufacturer	Years of manufacture	Axle arrangement	Royal Saxon St. Rly. No.
Comet and Faust	2	Rothwell	1835, 1838	B-n2 / B1-n2	
Blitz and Windsbraut	2	Rothwell	1836, 1837	B-n2 / B1-n2	
Columbus	1	Winans	1835	B-n2	
Renner to Greif	5	Kirtley	1837–1838	1A1-n2	
Edward Bury to Pfeil	4	Bury	1838	B-n2	
Peter Rothwell to Nordlicht	6	Rothwell	1838–1840	1A1-n2	
Robert Stephenson	1	Stephenson	1838	1A1-n2	
Brüssel	1	Renard	1842	1A1-n2	
Dresden to Riesa	3	Hawthorn	1844–1846	1B-n2	
Saxonia and Phoenix	2	Maschinenbauanstalt Übigau	1838–1840	B1-n2	
Pegasus	1	Sächsische Maschinenfabrik	1839	1A1n2	
Wurzen and Oschatz	2	Borsig	1847	1B-n2	
Elbe to Hayn	5	Borsig	1848–1850	1A1n2	
Richard Hartmann to Zwickau	3	Hartmann	1849	1A1n2	
LDE - Gustav Harkort etc.			1848–1868	1A1-n2	

== Sources ==
- Udo Becher: Die Leipzig-Dresdner Eisenbahn-Compagnie. transpress VEB Verlag für Verkehrswesen, Berlin 1981.
- Die Leipzig-Dresdner Eisenbahn, Anfänge und Gegenwart einer 150-jährigen, hrsg. v. Fritz Borchert, transpress VEB Verlag für Verkehrswesen, Berlin 1989, ISBN 3-344-00354-2
- Panorama der Eisenbahn zwischen Leipzig und Dresden, Koedition der Verlage transpress, Berlin und Tourist, Berlin/Leipzig, 1989, Hrsg. Gerhard Schlegel, ISBN 3-344-00348-8, Reprint eines Originals von 1839
