= Pankow =

- Borough of Berlin
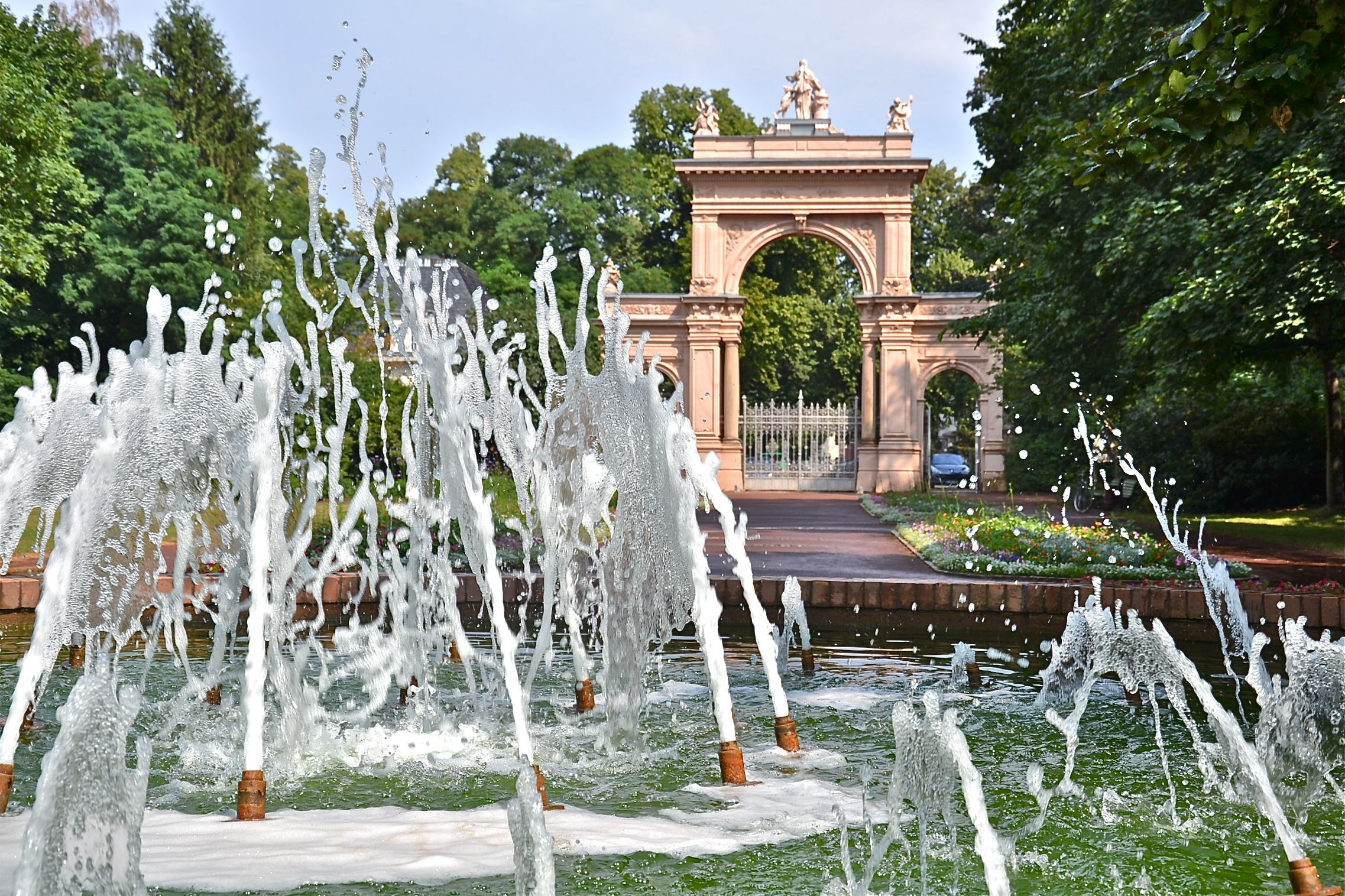
- Entrance of the Bürgerpark in the district

- Flag Coat of arms

- Location of Pankow in Berlin
- Interactive map of Pankow
- Location within Germany Location within Berlin
- Coordinates: 52°34′N 13°24′E
- Country: Germany
- State: Berlin
- City: Berlin
- Subdivisions: 13 localities

Government
  - Mayor: Cordelia Koch (Greens)

Area
  - Total: 103.07 km^{2} (39.80 sq mi)

Population (2024-12-31)
  - Total: 409,453
  - Density: 3,972.6/km^{2} (10,289/sq mi)
- Time zone: UTC+01:00 (CET)
  - Summer (DST): UTC+02:00 (CEST)
- Vehicle registration: B
- Website: berlin.de/ba-pankow

Pankow (German: [ˈpaŋkoː]) is the second largest and most populous borough of the German capital Berlin. In Berlin's 2001 administrative reform, it was merged with the former boroughs of Prenzlauer Berg and Weißensee; the resulting borough retained the name Pankow. Pankow was sometimes claimed by the Western Allies (United States, United Kingdom, and France) to be the capital of the German Democratic Republic (East Germany), while the German Democratic Republic itself considered Berlin to be its capital.

== Overview ==
The borough, named after the Panke river, covers the northeast of the city region, including the inner city locality of Prenzlauer Berg. It borders Mitte and Reinickendorf in the west, Friedrichshain-Kreuzberg in the south, and Lichtenberg in the east. Pankow is Berlin's largest borough by population and the second largest by area (after Treptow-Köpenick).

Between 1945 and 1960, Schönhausen Palace and the nearby Majakowskiring street in the Niederschönhausen locality of Pankow was the home to many members of the East German government. Western writers therefore often referred to Pankow as a metonym for the East German regime—as reflected by Udo Lindenberg's song "Sonderzug nach Pankow". The fact that -ow is rare as an ending for place names in West Germany and – especially in the inaccurate but common pronunciation [ˈpaŋkoːf] – sounds Slavic or more specifically "Russian" to German ears may have played a role in this use as it carried a connotation of the East German government being a foreign, more specifically Russian/Soviet, puppet regime – a claim right leaning newspapers and politicians often made much more openly than through this mere insinuation and connotation.

The Rykestrasse Synagogue, Germany's largest synagogue, is located in the Prenzlauer Berg locality. The Weißensee Cemetery is one of the largest Jewish cemeteries in Europe. In northern Prenzlauer Berg, the Wohnstadt ("residential town") Carl Legien is part of the Berlin Modernist Housing Estates UNESCO World Heritage Site. The Weißer See is the borough's largest natural body of water.

== Subdivision ==
Subdivisions of Pankow

The Pankow borough consists of 13 localities:

- Prenzlauer Berg
- Weissensee
- Blankenburg
- Heinersdorf
- Karow
- Stadtrandsiedlung Malchow
- Pankow
- Blankenfelde
- Buch
- Französisch Buchholz
- Niederschönhausen
- Rosenthal
- Wilhelmsruh

== Politics ==
=== District council ===
The governing body of Pankow is the district council (Bezirksverordnetenversammlung). It has responsibility for passing laws and electing the city government, including the mayor. The most recent district council election was held on 26 September 2021, and the results were as follows:

Party	Lead candidate	Votes	%	+/-	Seats	+/-
Alliance 90/The Greens (Grüne)	Cordelia Koch	56,349	24.7	▲4.1	16	▲4
The Left (LINKE)	Sören Benn	44,351	19.4	▼1.6	12	▼1
Social Democratic Party (SPD)	Rona Tietje	38,984	18.1	▼3.0	11	▼1
Christian Democratic Union (CDU)	Denise Bittner	28,165	12.3	▼0.4	8	±0
Alternative for Germany (AfD)	Daniel Krüger	17,822	7.8	▼5.5	5	▼3
Free Democratic Party (FDP)	Thomas Enge	13,241	5.8	▲1.9	3	▲1
Tierschutzpartei		6,053	2.7	New	0	New
Die PARTEI		5,310	2.3	▼0.3	0	±0
dieBasis		4,236	1.9	New	0	New
Volt Germany		3,980	1.7	New	0	New
The Greys		3,429	1.5	New	0	New
Free Voters		2,315	1.0	New	0	New
Klimaliste		1,885	0.8	New	0	New
Renters' Party		1,523	0.7	▼0.9	0	±0
Ecological Democratic Party		459	0.2	New	0	New
Valid votes		228,102	99.3			
Invalid votes		1,561	0.7			
Total		229,663	100.0		55	±0
Electorate/voter turnout		310,049	74.1	▲7.3		
Source: Elections Berlin

=== District government ===
The district mayor (Bezirksbürgermeister) is elected by the Bezirksverordnetenversammlung, and positions in the district government (Bezirksamt) are apportioned based on party strength. Sören Benn of The Left was elected mayor on 27 October 2016. Since the 2021 municipal elections, the composition of the district government is as follows:

Councillor	Party	Portfolio
Sören Benn	LINKE	District Mayor; Economy, Finance, Staff and Logistics
Cordelia Koch	GRÜNE	Deputy Mayor; Social Affairs, Health and Planning
Rona Tietje	SPD	Urban Development and Civil Service
Manuela Anders-Granitzki	CDU	Public Order, Streets, Green Spaces and Environment
Cornelius Bechtler	GRÜNE	Youth
Dominique Krössin	LINKE	Education, Sport and Culture
Source: Berlin.de

== Transportation ==
=== Motorised transportation ===
Pankow's road network is characterised by three radial axes to and from the city centre at Alexanderplatz - all of them running in a north/north-eastern direction: B96a (Schönhauser Allee/Berliner Straße), B109 (Prenzlauer Allee/Prenzlauer Promenade) and B2 (Greifswalder Straße/Berliner Allee). B109 leads to A114; Pankow is also the only borough in Berlin which is directly served by the Berliner Ring A10.

The ring roads of Danziger Straße (within the Berlin S-Bahn circle line) and Ostseestraße - Wisbyer Straße - Bornholmer Straße also of high importance.

=== Public transportation ===
Pankow is served by the S-Bahn lines S1, S2, S25, S26, S41, S42, S8 and S85. The northeastern part of the Berlin S-Bahn circle line is located in Pankow, which includes the stations of Storkower Straße, Landsberger Allee, Greifswalder Straße, Prenzlauer Allee and Schönhauser Allee. Bornholmer Straße station and Wollankstraße station border the borough of Mitte, while Schönholz station and Wilhelmsruh station border Reinickendorf. The Stettiner Bahn serves Pankow, Pankow-Heinersdorf, Blankenburg, Karow and Buch. These stations are spread across the borough and are particularly important in connecting its western and northern parts, which do not have tram access.

In addition to the S-Bahn, five U-Bahn stations of the U2 line are located in the south of the borough of Pankow: Senefelderplatz, Eberswalder Straße, Schönhauser Allee, Vinetastraße and Pankow. At Schönhauser Allee and Pankow, travellers can change to S-Bahn services.

Many tram lines serve the borough in its southern, more urban half, with a particular density in the central and densely populated Prenzlauer Berg. In many parts of the borough, trams are the most important mode of public transportation.

== Twin towns – sister cities ==
Pankow is twinned with:

- Ashkelon, Israel (1994)
- Kołobrzeg, Poland (1994)
- Rivne, Ukraine (2024)

== Photogallery ==
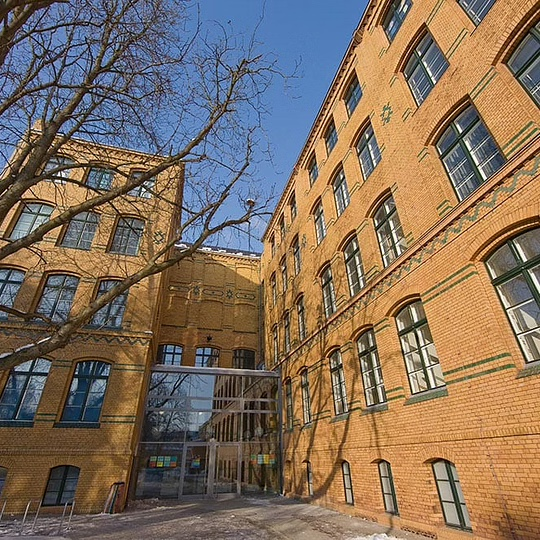
School behind the town hall

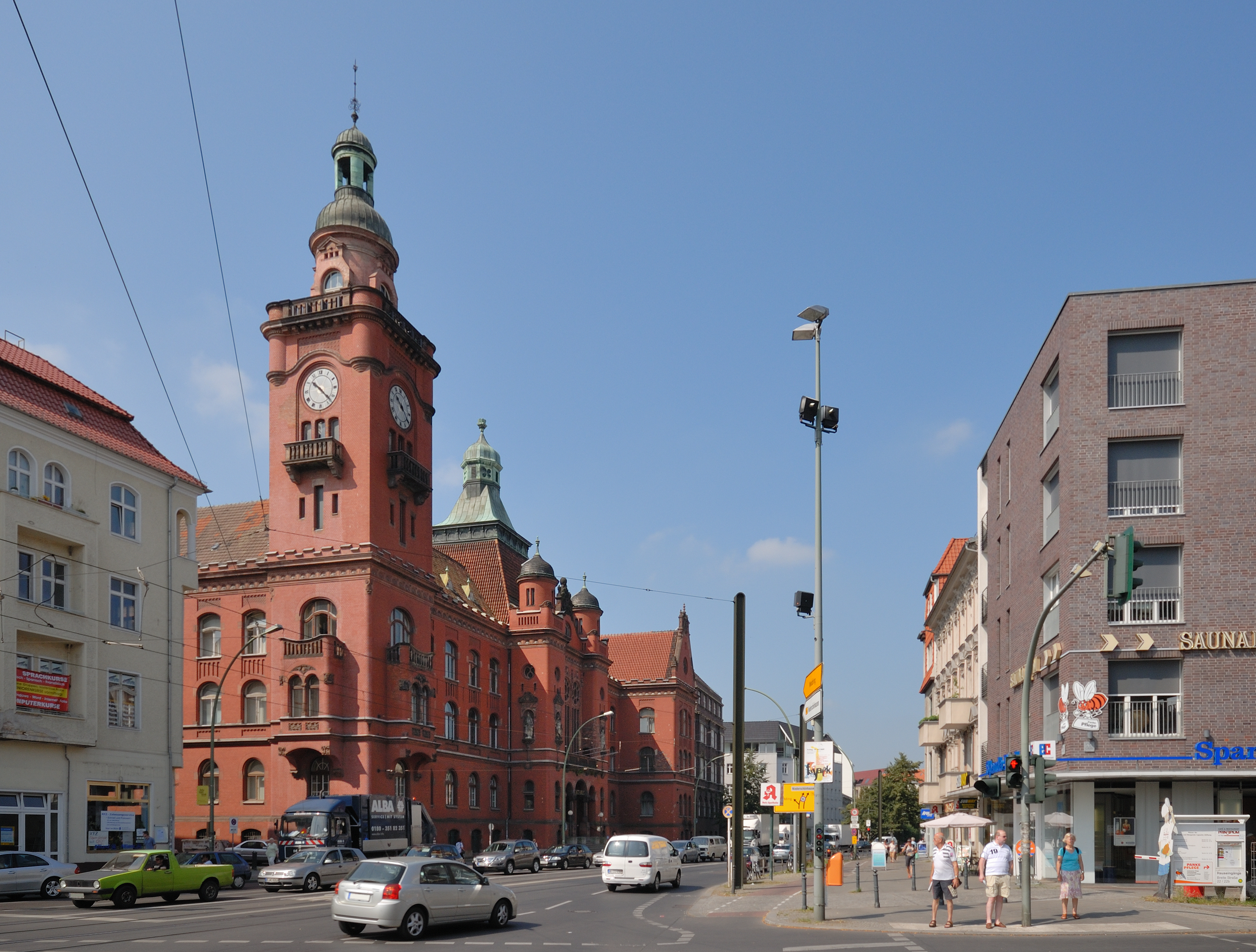
Town hall

== See also ==
- Berlin-Pankow (electoral district)
- Berlin-Friedrichshain-Kreuzberg – Prenzlauer Berg East (electoral district)
- Karpfenteich
