= Delphic Games of the modern era =

Delphic Games of the modern era involve presentations, exhibitions, competitions and other activities in six different fields of art. They are inspired by the Delphic Games of ancient Greece.

== Historical reference ==
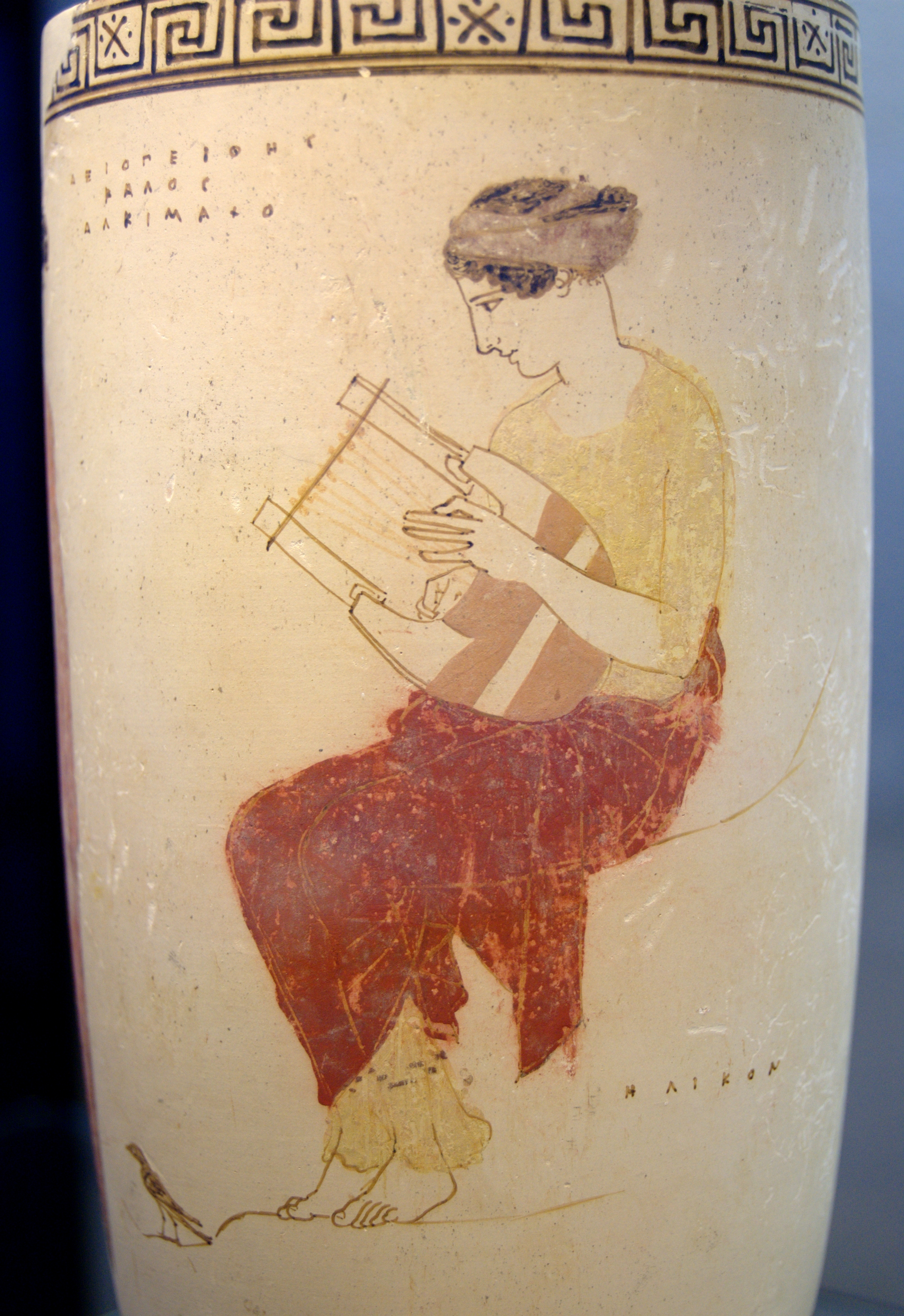
A Muse with Kithara on Mount Mount Helicon, Achilles Painter (at 440-430 BC), State collections of antiquities Munich, Germany

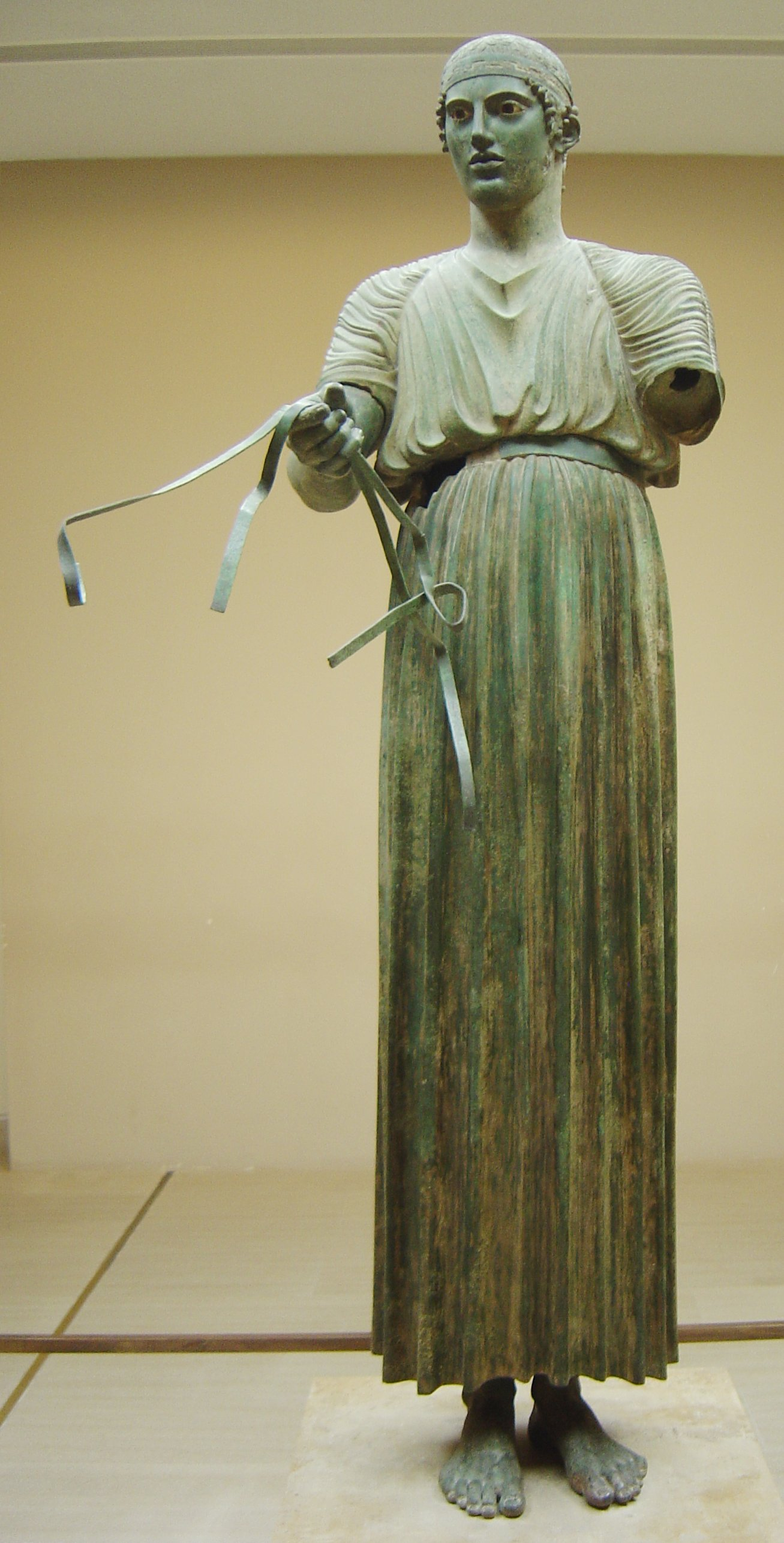
Statue of a charioteer (at 478-474 BC), Archaeological Museum Delphi, Greece

One of the four Panhellenic Games were the Pythian Games in Delphi. Held every four years, they included competitions in athletics, theatre, music, poetry, and painting to praise the god Apollo, the symbol of the Oracle. In the year 394 A.D., Theodosius I, the emperor of the Byzantine Empire banned all Panhellenic Games as being pagan events.

From 1912 till 1948, on the initiative of Pierre de Coubertin, art competitions at the Summer Olympics were held in various countries. Medals were awarded for works related solely to sport.

There was also an attempt to revive Pythian Games at the archeological site of Delphi, at the initiative by the Greek poet Angelos Sikelianos and his wife Eva Palmer. In 1927, the first Delphic Festival was held in Greece, but the revival was then abandoned.

Nowadays there are so-called Delphi Festivals, which are the closest to their Panhellenic counterparts. They include religious rituals and activities like poetry competition, religious offerings, sports and of course feasting.

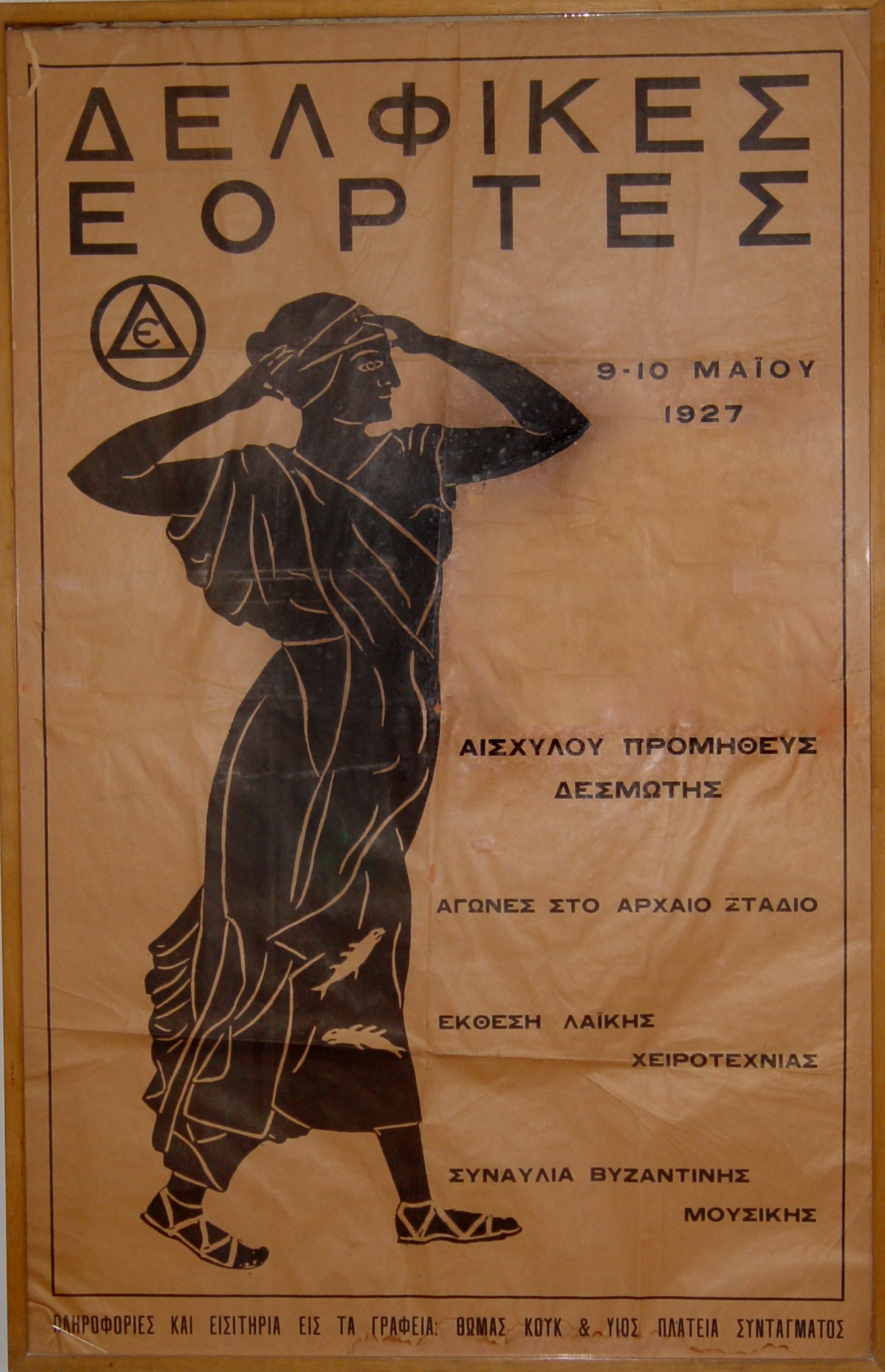
Poster of the Delphic Festival, 1927

In the second half of the 20th century, there was another attempt to restore Delphic Games. Since the 1990s, representatives from Argentina, Austria, China, Cyprus, Ecuador, France, Germany, Greece, Kazakhstan, Libya, Lithuania, Mexico, Nigeria, Philippines, Poland, Russia, Slovakia, and the United States came together and organized First International Delphic Games, which took place in 2000 in Moscow, Russia (before that the concept was tested out in Tbilisi, Georgia, where the first Junior Delphic Games took place.)

== Current revivals ==
Currently, there are two organizations conducting Delphic Games.

The International Delphic Council (IDC) with headquarters in Berlin was founded in 1994 at the Schönhausen Palace. Since 1995 the IDC actively supports the creation of the National Delphic organizations. Since 1997 the IDC has organized the International Youth Delphic Games in Georgia, Germany, Philippines, South Africa, as well as, since 2000, the International Delphic Games for adult participants in Russia, Malaysia, South Korea. The IDC held Delphic Games and Junior Delphic Games in the four-year cycle, two years offset from one another, such as the Olympic Games, held at different locations in the world. The International Delphic Games and Congresses receive greetings, patronage and support from various international organizations and celebrities.

A newer organization, International Delphic Committee (IDC) with headquarters in Moscow, was registered in 2004. It organizes International Delphic Games, Youth Delphic Games of Russia and Youth Delphic Games of CIS. Since 2005 the Junior Delphic Games in Russia and the Junior Delphic Games in Commonwealth of Independent States are conducted by the International Delphic Committee. These Junior Delphic Games are dedicated to significant domestic events. This International Delphic Committee conducted also in September 2008 the Second International Delphic Games in Saratov / Russia, but some Saratov Sunday editions and news portals questioned the status and legitimacy of the games.

Under the patronage of the International Delphic Committee (headquartered in Moscow) and UNESCO, the First Open Youth European Delphic Games were held in Volgograd, Russia, on May 2–7, 2014.

There are also the Modern Pythian Games which are designed to celebrate traditional sports and art; the first quadrennial edition is scheduled to occur in 2027, though subsidiary competitions have already begun, with an online poetry and painting competition having been held in 2023.
