= First Open Youth European Delphic Games =

First Open Youth European Delphic Games were Delphic Games held on 2–7 May 2014 in Volgograd, Russia.

721 young artists from 26 countries took part in 17 nominations of the contest and festival program of the Games.

== See also ==
- Pythian Games
- International Delphic Committee
