= National Delphic Council Nepal =

Non profit organization

- The National Delphic Council Nepal
- नेशनल डेल्फिक काउन्सिल नेपाल
- Founder: Baburam Aryal (Sridev BL)
- Headquarters: Kathmandu, Nepal
- Location: Nepal
- Services: Promoting Nepali Arts and Culture
- Fields: Arts and Culture
- Official language: Nepali
- President: Baburam Aryal (Sridev BL)
- Founder Members: Jiwan Kumar Parajuli, Sarada Khadka Aryal, Deepak Bista Gauli etc
- Key people: Baburam Aryal (Sridev BL), Sarada Khadka Aryal, Jiwan Kumar Parajuli
- Main organ: President, Founder Members
- Website: https://delphicnepal.org.np/

The National Delphic Council Nepal (NDC-Nepal)(Nepali : नेशनल डेल्फिक काउन्सिल नेपाल) is a non-profit organization based in Nepal, with a primary objective of globally promoting Nepali arts and culture. Serving as the Nepal Chapter of the International Delphic Council, NDC-Nepal actively contributes to the global cultural exchange initiatives of the broader organization. The founding committee of NDC-Nepal is led by President Baburam Aryal (Sridev BL), with esteemed founder members including Jiwan Kumar Parajuli, Sarada Khadka Aryal, Deepak Bista Gauli etc.

== History ==
The International Delphic Council (IDC), a non-profit organization based in Berlin Germany, was established in 1994 with the mission of reviving the Delphic Games of the Modern Era. The National Delphic Council Nepal, was established in 2021, functions as the Nepal Chapter of the IDC, dedicated to advancing Nepali arts and culture in alignment with the IDC's overarching goals for global cultural exchange.
