= Close up (disambiguation) =

A close-up is tightly framed image of a person or an object.

Close-Up or Close Up may refer to:

== Film and television ==
- Close Up (1948 film), a 1948 Eagle-Lion Pictures crime film
- Close-Up (1990 film), by Abbas Kiarostami
- Close Up (TV programme), a New Zealand current affairs programmes that aired from 2004 to 2012
- Close Up (1980s), a New Zealand current affairs programmes that aired in the 1980s
- "Close Up" (Duty Free), a 1986 TV episode
- "Close Up" (UFO), a 1970 TV episode

== Music ==
=== Albums ===
- Close Up (Joey Yung album), a 2006 album
- Close-Up (The Kingston Trio album), a 1961 album
- Close Up (The Outsiders album), a 1978 album
- Close Up a.k.a. Tom Jones Close Up, a 1972 album
- Close Up (EP), a 2009 EP by Jason Chan
- Close-Up, Merle Haggard album, 1969
- Close-Up, Sonny James album, 1969
- Close-Up, Buck Owens album, 1969
- Close-Up, Frank Sinatra album, 1969
- Close-Up, The Lettermen album, 1969
- Close-Up, Jackie Gleason album, 1969
- Close-Up, Lou Rawls album, 1969
- Close-Up, Nat 'King' Cole album, 1969
- Close-Up, Nancy Wilson album, 1969
- Close-Up, The Beach Boys album, 1969
- Close Up, a 1988 album by saxophonist David Sanborn
- Close Up, an unreleased album by Lobo
- Close Up, album by Louise Mandrell released in 1983

=== Songs ===
- "Close Up", a song by Peter Gabriel from his 1985 album Birdy
- "Close Up", a song by Cinerama from their 2002 album Torino
- "Close Up", a song by Frou Frou on the UK release of the single "Breathe In" from the 2002 album Details
- "Close Up", a 2013 song by Anton Ewald
- "Close Up", a song by Olivia Dean from her 2025 album The Art of Loving

== Other uses ==
- Close Up Foundation, a nonprofit, nonpartisan US citizenship education organization
- Close-Up (toothpaste), a brand of toothpaste sold in Asia by Unilever and in the US by Church & Dwight
- Close Up (magazine), a literary magazine active 1927–1933
- Close-Up (book), a 2022 book by Jiwan Parajuli
- ⁐, the "close up" proofreading mark
