= Elena Obraztsova =

Soviet and Russian opera singer

- Елена Образцова
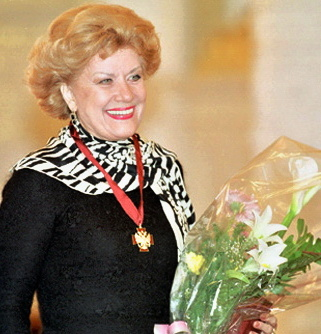
- Obraztsova at the Kremlin, 2000
- Born: Yelena Vasilyevna Obraztsova; July 7, 1939; Leningrad, RSFSR, Soviet Union
- Died: 12 January 2015 (aged 75); Leipzig, Saxony, Germany
- Occupation: Opera singer (mezzo-soprano)
- Awards: Hero of Socialist Labour

Elena Vasilyevna Obraztsova (Russian: Еле́на Васи́льевна Образцо́ва, IPA: [ɪ̯ɪˈlʲenə vɐˈsʲilʲɪ̯ɪvnə ɐbrɐˈstsovə]; 7 July 1939 – 12 January 2015) was a Soviet and Russian mezzo-soprano. She was awarded the People's Artist of the USSR in 1976 and Hero of Socialist Labour in 1990.

== Life ==
As a child, Obraztsova lived in Leningrad through the severe long siege (more than 870 days) during World War II. In 1948, at the age of nine, she began singing in the children's chorus of the Pioneers Palace in Leningrad.

From 1954 to 1957, she studied in the Tchaikovsky musical college in Taganrog and frequently participated in concerts onstage of Taganrog Theatre. From 1957 to 1958, Obraztsova studied in Rostov-on-Don's music school. In August 1958, Obraztsova passed the examinations and became a student at the Leningrad Conservatory. In 1963 she was invited to perform in a Bolshoi Theatre production of Boris Godunov in Moscow. Her introduction to the opera houses of Europe and the world was a recital in the Salle Pleyel in Paris.

== Opera career ==
She played many roles throughout her career, including performances under the baton of such leading conductors as Claudio Abbado and Herbert von Karajan. In December 1977 she opened the 200th opera season in La Scala singing Don Carlos's Eboli with Abbado as conductor. She first performed in New York in 1976, in Aida, and was called a "major artist" in reviews.

In 1978, she played the title role of Carmen opposite Plácido Domingo in Franco Zeffirelli's television production of the opera. She also appeared as Santuzza in Zeffirelli's film version of Cavalleria rusticana in 1982. In her career she performed in operas with many other well-known opera singers of her generation: Luciano Pavarotti, Joan Sutherland, Ingvar Wixell, and appeared in Don Carlos with Domingo and Margaret Price.

On 27 December 1990, she was awarded the title of the Hero of Socialist Labour (mark of distinction - "Hammer and Sickle" gold medal ), Order of Lenin by the President of USSR for her contribution to the development of Soviet Music.

In June 2007, Obraztsova was appointed artistic director of opera at the Mikhailovsky Theatre in St. Petersburg. She also trained young soloists in her own cultural center in St. Petersburg. Obraztsova regularly appeared on stage at the Mikhailovsky in the role of the Countess in Tchaikovsky's The Queen of Spades. In 2008, Obraztsova ended her artistic director contract with the Mikhailovsky to concentrate on the competition of her name and the recently announced project of International Academy of Music in St Petersburg. Obraztsova remained in collaboration with the Mikhailovsky at the General Director's Artistic Advisor.

On 7 July 2009, Obraztsova's 70th birthday was marked with a special program at the Mikhailovsky Theater that included ballet performances, opera arias, excerpts from films, and jazz and piano recitals.

== Personal life ==
She strongly supported the Soviet Union, and signed a letter in 1974 denouncing Mstislav Rostropovich and Galina Vishnevskaya for their support for Aleksandr Solzhenitsyn.

Obraztsova expressed her support for the International Delphic Games. Greetings with her signature came to the III Delphic Games 2009 in Jeju/South Korea, under the motto "In Tune with Nature", and to the IV Junior Delphic Games 2011 in Johannesburg/South Africa with their motto "Provoke, Innovate, Inspire".

She was married twice, first to Vyacheslav Makarov, a physicist, and later Algis Ziuraitis, who was a conductor at the Bolshoi. She had a daughter, Elena, with Makarov.

== Death ==
Obraztsova died on 12 January 2015 in Leipzig, Saxony, Germany, while undergoing medical treatment. She was 75 years old.

== Honours and awards ==
- Glinka State Prize of the RSFSR (1st prize) (1962)
- 1970 - Viñas prize (1st prize, International Vocal Competition in Barcelona)
- Honored Artist of the RSFSR
- 1970 Tchaikovsky prize (1st prize)
- Order of the Red Banner of Labour, twice (1971, 1980)
- Glinka State Prize of the RSFSR - for concerts and theatrical activities 1971-1972 period (1973)
- People's Artist of the RSFSR (1973)
- Lenin Prize - for concert programs in 1973-1974 and the roles of Froska "(Simeon Kolko)", Carmen and Azucena "(Il Trovatore)" (1976)
- People's Artist of the USSR (1976)
- Hero of Socialist Labour (27 December 1990) - for outstanding contributions to the development of Soviet musical art
- Order of Lenin (27 December 1990)
- Order "For Merit to the Fatherland", 3rd class (17 June 1999) - for outstanding contribution to the development of musical art
- Casta Diva prize (2002)
- Order "For Merit to the Fatherland", 2nd class (10 June 2009) - for outstanding contribution to music and many years of fruitful creative activity
- Order of the Holy Prince Daniel of Moscow, 1st class (Russian Orthodox Church, 2009) - in consideration of his labours for the good of the Church and in connection with her 70th birthday

== Repertory ==
Role	Composer	Opera
Adalgisa	Bellini	Norma
Amneris	Verdi	Aida
Azucena	Verdi	Il trovatore
Carmen	Bizet	Carmen
Charlotte	Massenet	Werther
Countess	Tchaikovsky	The Queen of Spades
Dalila	Saint-Saëns	Samson et Dalila
Eboli	Verdi	Don Carlos
Federica	Verdi	Luisa Miller
Frosya	Prokofiev	Semyon Kotko
Giovanna Seymour	Donizetti	Anna Bolena
Governess	Tchaikovsky	The Queen of Spades
Grandma	Prokofiev	The Gambler
Hélène Bezukhova	Prokofiev	War and Peace
Hérodiade	Massenet	Hérodiade
Jocasta	Stravinsky	Oedipus rex
Judith	Béla Bartók	Bluebeard's Castle
Konchakovna	Borodin	Prince Igor
Léonor de Guzman (Leonora di Gusmann)	Donizetti	La favorite
Lyubasha	Rimsky-Korsakov	The Tsar's Bride
Lyubava Buslayevna	Rimsky-Korsakov	Sadko
Marfa	Mussorgsky	Khovanshchina
Maria Akhrosimova	Prokofiev	War and Peace
Marina Mniszech	Mussorgsky	Boris Godunov
Marya Bolkonskaya	Prokofiev	War and Peace
Néris	Cherubini	Médée
Oberon	Britten	A Midsummer Night's Dream
Orfeo	Gluck	Orfeo ed Euridice
Santuzza^{1}	Mascagni	Cavalleria rusticana^{1}
Silvana	Respighi	La fiamma
The Marquise of Birkenfeld	Donizetti	The Daughter of the Regiment
The Princess	Puccini	Suor Angelica
Polina; Milovzor (Daphnis)	Tchaikovsky	The Queen of Spades
Princess de Bouillon	Cilea	Adriana Lecouvreur
Prince Orlofsky	J. Strauss II	Die Fledermaus
Ulrica	Verdi	Un ballo in maschera
Zhenya Komelkova	Molchanov	The Dawns Here Are Quiet

- ^{1} Concert performance of the opera/operetta
