= Schönhausen Palace =

- Schloss Schönhausen
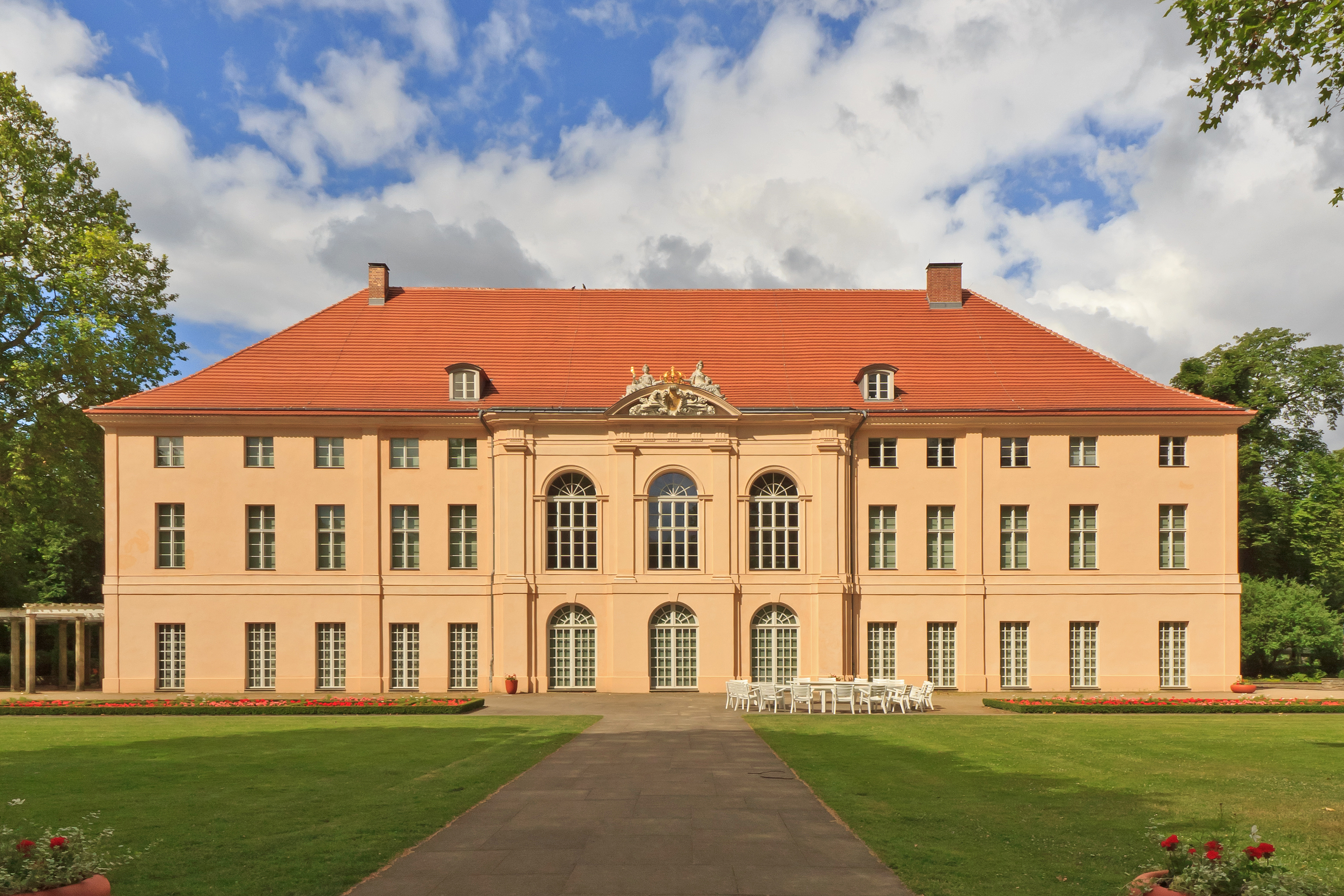
- Schönhausen Palace

- Location within Berlin Location within Germany

General information
- Type: Palace
- Architectural style: Baroque
- Location: Berlin, Germany
- Coordinates: 52.578°N 13.405°E
- Client: Frederick I of Prussia
- Owner: Stiftung Preußische Schlösser und Gärten Berlin-Brandenburg

Design and construction
- Architect: Johann Arnold Nering

Website
- Stiftung Preußische Schlösser und Gärten

Schönhausen Palace (German: Schloss Schönhausen, pronounced [ˈʃlɔs ʃøːnˈhaʊzn̩]) is a Baroque palace at Niederschönhausen, in the borough of Pankow, Berlin, Germany. It is surrounded by gardens through which the Panke river runs. The palace is maintained by the Prussian Palaces and Gardens Foundation Berlin-Brandenburg and reopened to the public in 2009 after extensive restoration.

== History ==
=== Brandenburg-Prussia ===
In 1662 Countess Sophie Theodore, a scion of the Holland-Brederode family and wife of the Brandenburg general Christian Albert of Dohna, acquired the lands Niederschönhausen and Pankow, then far north of the Berlin city gates. In 1664 she built a manor at Niederschönhausen in "Dutch" style. Minister Joachim Ernst von Grumbkow acquired it in 1680 and, in 1691, his widow sold it for 16,000 Thalers to the Hohenzollern elector Frederick III of Brandenburg, who had fallen in love with the property earlier.

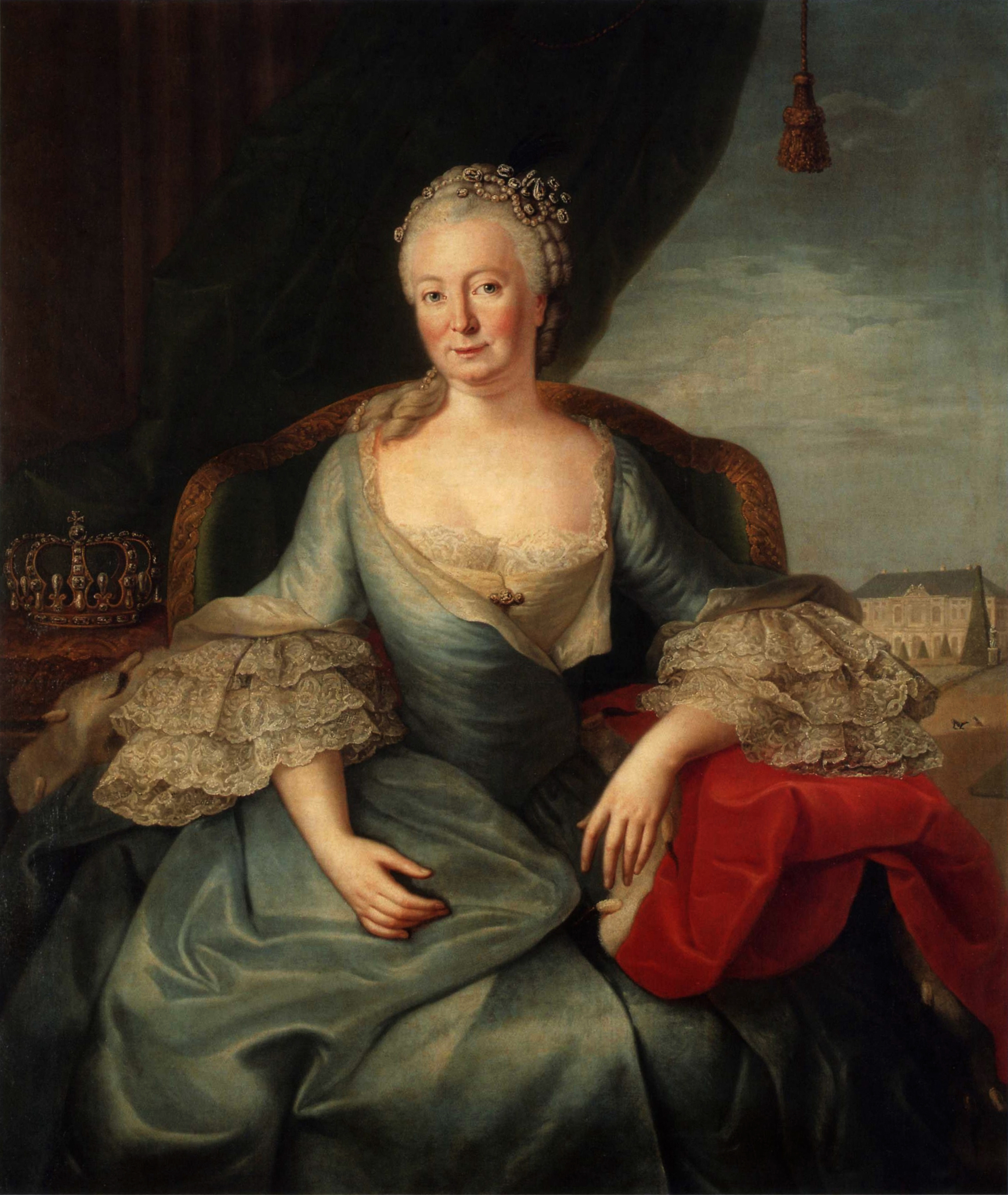
Queen Elisabeth Christine in front of Schönhausen Palace, 1764

Frederick put the manor under the care of the Amt Niederschönhausen and had it remodeled into a palace from 1691 to 1693 based on plans designed by Johann Arnold Nering. In August 1700 the Prince-elector prepared and planned his coronation as King in Prussia at Schönhausen Palace. In 1704 the now King Frederick I in Prussia contracted Eosander von Göthe to again enlarge the palace and its gardens. However, after the king's death in 1713, his son and successor Frederick William I did not care much for the place. As a result, civil servants, such as Minister Friedrich Wilhelm von Grumbkow, moved in to use it as office space, part of the land was leased and both the palace and the park slowly became dilapidated in the ensuing years.

Under King Frederick II of Prussia, also known as "Frederick the Great", the palace was once again turned into a royal residence for his wife, Elisabeth Christine of Brunswick-Bevern, who used it as her regular summer residence from 1740 to 1790. Artist Johann Michael Graff most probably contributed the lavish stucco decorations executed during this time. As Frederick's relations with his wife were strained, he never visited Niederschönhausen and spent his summers at Sanssouci in Potsdam.

During the Seven Years' War in 1760, while the queen retreated to the Magdeburg fortress, Russian troops pushed deep into Prussia, occupied Berlin and devastated Niederschönhausen Palace. After 1763 it was rebuilt in its current form according to plans by Johann Boumann and the gardens were remodeled in a Rococo à la française style.

After the death of Queen Elisabeth Christine in 1797 the palace was used as a country seat by the family in exile in Berlin of the later king William I of the Netherlands and his Prussian wife and children [Jeroen van Zanten, Koning Willem II 1792-1849, Amsterdam 2013]. At times Frederica of Mecklenburg-Strelitz, widow of Prince Louis Charles of Prussia, lived at Schönhausen and had the gardens again remodeled, this time by Peter Joseph Lenné into an English landscape garden. Apart from that it served mainly as a storage facility for furniture and paintings.

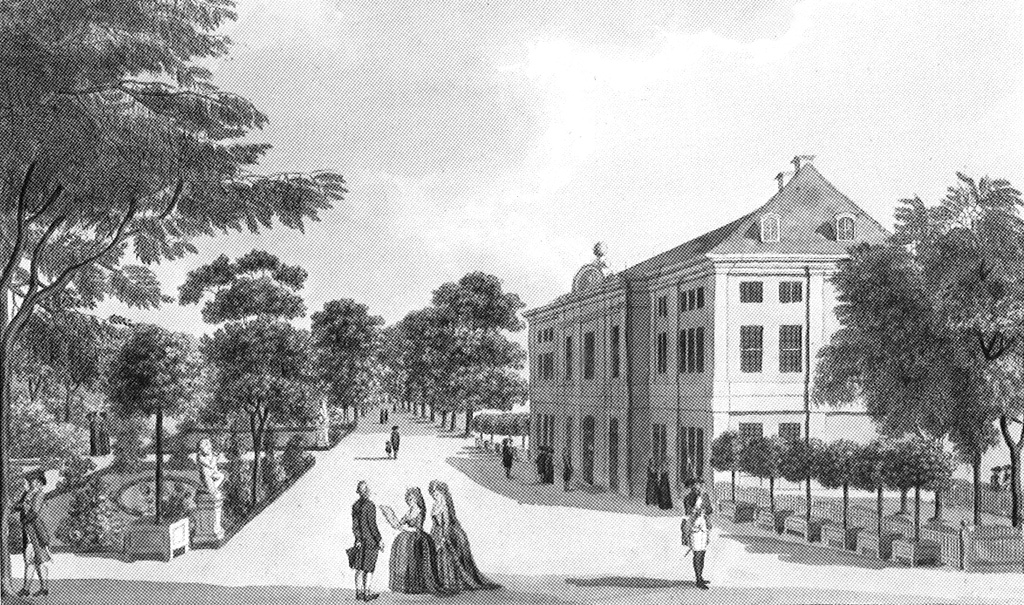
Schönhausen about 1787

It was rumored that King Frederick II had his favorite horse Condé buried in the gardens, but whether the hill in question actually is a horse's grave has not been proven. In fact Condé outlived its owner and died in 1804, aged 38. Its skeleton is kept at the veterinary department of the Free University of Berlin.

=== 20th century ===
The Prussian ruling Hohenzollern dynasty owned Schönhausen Palace until it was dispossessed and became a property of the Free State of Prussia in 1920, following the end of the monarchy in the course of the German Revolution of 1918–1919. It was then opened to the public and used for numerous art exhibitions as well as the government's official art department during the Nazi era, when several paintings of banned so-called "degenerate art" were stored here. During the Battle of Berlin at the end of World War II, the palace suffered some damage but was repaired almost immediately by a Pankow Künstlerinitiative so that it could be used for an exhibit as early as September 1945. Soon thereafter the Soviet Military Administration confiscated the palace and turned it into an officer's mess. Later it served as a boarding school for Soviet students.

When the German Democratic Republic (GDR) was established in the Soviet occupation zone on 7 October 1949, the Soviets turned Schönhausen Palace over to the East German authorities and until 1960 it served as the official seat of the GDR president Wilhelm Pieck, where he received state guests like Nikita Khrushchev and Ho Chi Minh. For this purpose, it was again renovated and expansion of the complex took place to the north for garages for the vehicle fleet of the President and to the south for a casino and a chancellery in a prestigious courtyard with two gatehouses. The castle garden was separated by a wall into an inner, no longer public, and an outer, public part. The interior design of the garden was done by architect Reinhold Lingner as a cheerful, open-looking garden in the typical style of the 1950s. After the death of the first and only President of the GDR in 1960 it served at first as the seat of the newly established East German State Council, which moved to the Staatsratsgebäude at Mitte in 1964. It was then used by the GDR government as its official guest house and officially renamed Schloss Niederschönhausen. Numerous state visitors lodged here, among them Indira Gandhi, Fidel Castro, the last Soviet president Mikhail Gorbachev, and his wife Raisa Gorbacheva, in October 1989 on the eve of the East German Peaceful Revolution. At that time, the palace and part of the gardens were closed to the public and surrounded by a tall wall.

=== After German reunification ===
While German reunification was in progress in 1989 and 1990, the so-called Round Table met in the palace's outbuildings. Major portions of the negotiations leading to the Treaty on the Final Settlement with Respect to Germany also took place here, and a plaque now memorializes this period.

After German reunification, the palace became the property of the Bundesvermögensamt, the division of the German treasury in charge of managing government-owned real estate. In 1991 the state of Berlin became the new owner of the palace and its gardens, and in 1997 the state put the property up for sale.

In 1994, 100 years after the revival of the Olympic Games, the representatives from Argentina, Austria, China, Cyprus, Ecuador, France, Germany, Greece, Kazakhstan, Libya, Liechtenstein, Lithuania, Mexico, Nigeria, Philippines, Poland, Russia, Slovakia, Switzerland, United States, who arrived to the founding congress of the International Delphic Council to establish the Delphic Games of the modern era, met at the palace.

In 2003 there was some discussion about using the palace as the temporary residence of the President of Germany until the renovation of Schloss Bellevue would be completed, but this plan fell through because of the high cost (approximately €12 million) that would have been required to bring the palace sufficiently up to standards. Furthermore, due to impregnation of the roof structure with chemicals to protect the wooden beams, for several years only the two lower floors could be used for occasional celebrations and guided tours.

In June 2005, ownership of the palace was transferred to the Prussian Palaces and Gardens Foundation Berlin-Brandenburg. At the same time, €8.6 million in federal funds was earmarked for renovation work. The palace was reopened to the public on 19 December 2009. In addition to the historic rooms dating to the time of the Prussian queen, the rooms used by the GDR president were reopened. Refurnishing the office used by Wilhelm Pieck and building a café for museum guests were also being considered. Furthermore, artworks from the collection of Elisabeth Christine and the Dohna-Schlobitten collection have been exhibited there.

Restoration of the gardens to their layout when the president of the GDR worked here was planned. Thought was also given to the future of the garage, which was protected as a historic landmark.

Beginning in 2003, the Bundesakademie für Sicherheitspolitik (BAKS) was housed in two of the palace's auxiliary outbuildings.

== See also ==
- List of castles in Berlin and Brandenburg
- List of castles in Germany
