= International Delphic Council =

Organization based in Berlin, Germany

External image
- IDC News

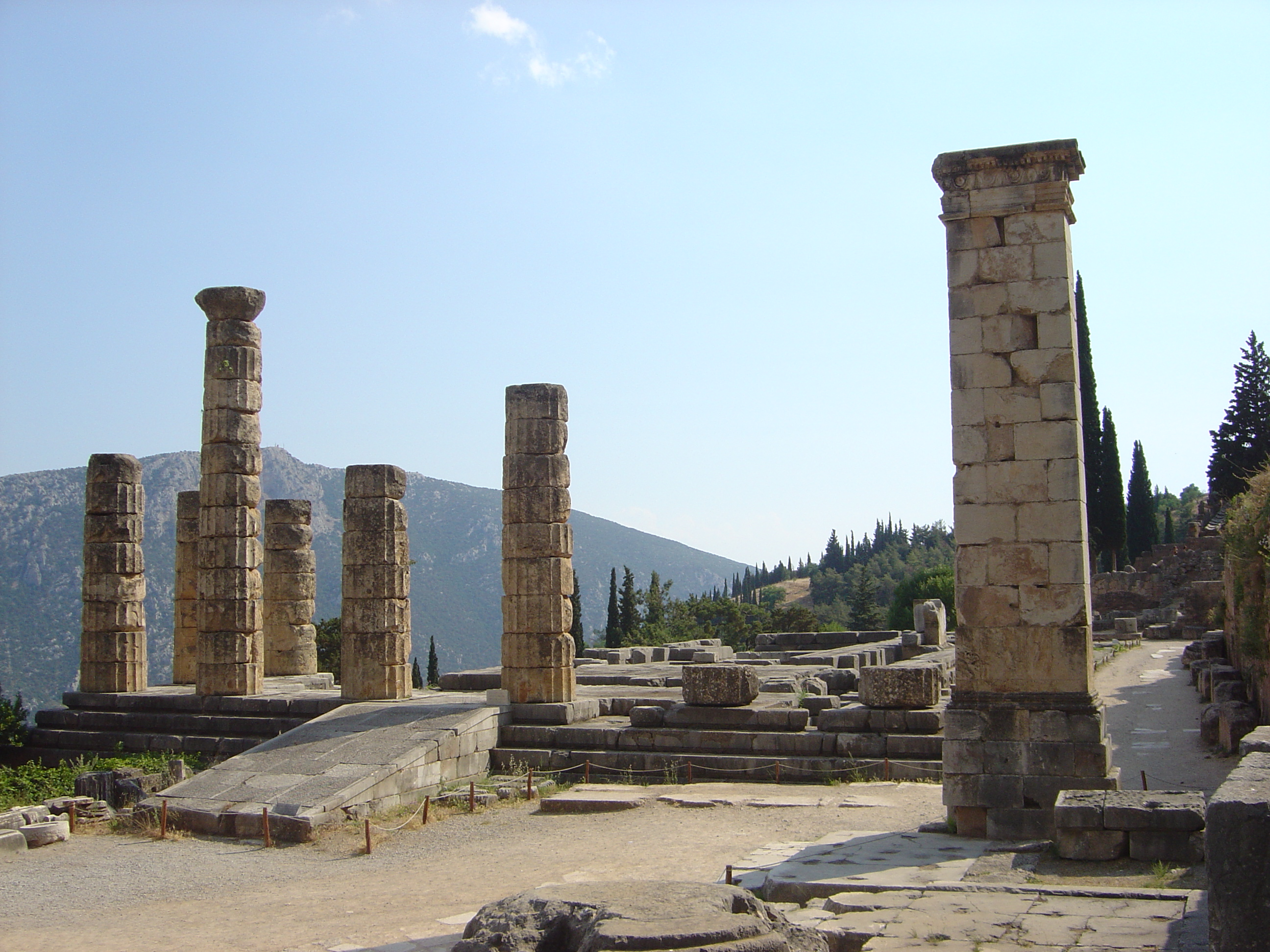
Delphi, the ruins of the Apollo Temple, in whose honor the Pythian Games were held

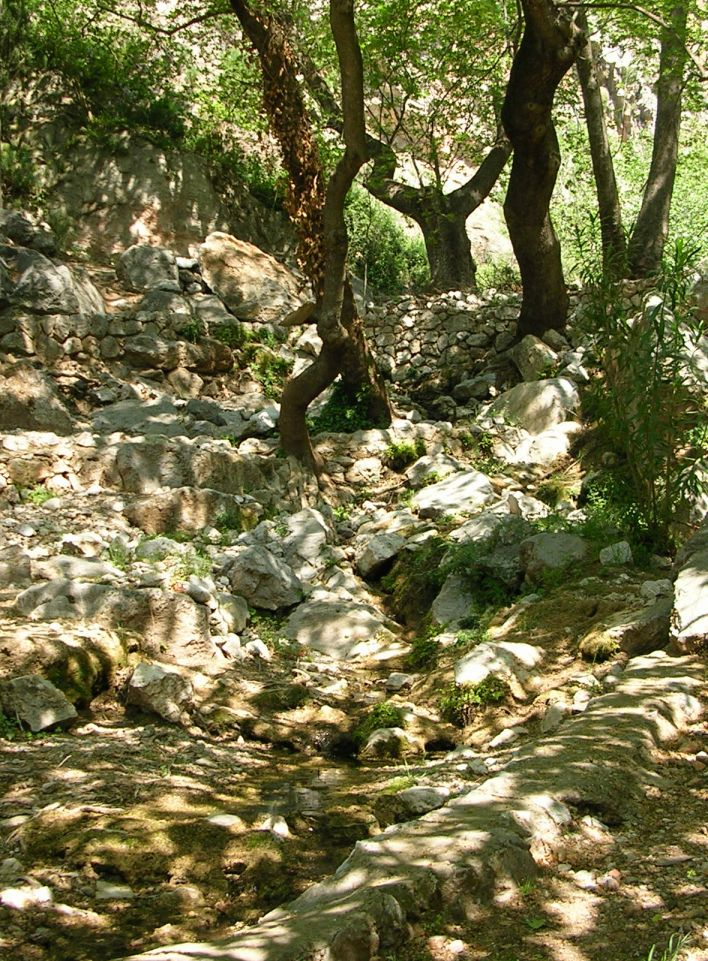
Castalian Spring at the foot of the mountain Mount Parnassus in Delphi. In ancient times, this spring was to Apollon and Muse dedicated

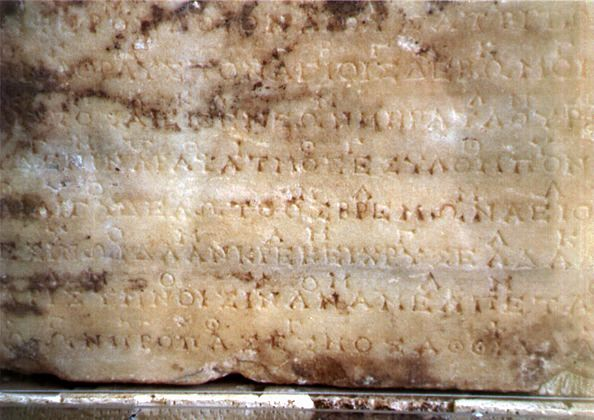
Hymn to Apollo. Photograph of the original stone at Delphi

International Delphic Council (IDC) is a not-for-profit, charitable, non aligned, non-sectarian & non-governmental organisation (NGO), headquartered in Berlin, Germany. It was formed as a League of 20 Nations in 1994 in Berlin to revive the Delphic Games of the Modern Era, although there is a separate organisation, International Delphic Committee, headquartered in Russia, created after Russia NDC split from the international Delphic Council in the year 2000 and works in the CIS region.

== Historical reference ==
The Delphic Games of the Modern Era were inspired by the ancient and traditional Pythian Games of Delphi, also known as the Delphic Games;- the best known historic example of an initiative for peace and harmony amongst human beings through a dialogue of arts and encounter of cultures.

The original Games were between artists and ethnic cultural groups and showcased artistic expressions, physical sports and cultural engagements. The underlying essence of the competitions was humility. They took place each year preceding to the Olympic Games, to celebrate God Apollo, the Greek God for celebrations and artistic endeavours. The historic Pythian or Delphic Games in Delphi can be traced as far back as 2,600 years ago. The spiritual leaders formed the Pan-Hellenic Games to perform wonders, theatre, music, and poetry to praise the Greek God Apollo. The Pythian Games in Delphi were one of the four Panhellenic Games, a forerunner of the modern Olympic Games, held every four years at the sanctuary of Apollo at Delphi. Pythian Games were named after the legendary high priestess Pythia, who was a foreteller of fortunes and also known as the Oracle of Delphi. The Oracle had a seat at the Sanctuary of God Apollo and an institution for over 1000 years. The influence of Pythia was so powerful that historical figures like Socrates, Aristotle, Alexander and such used to take her advice before they did something new. Pythia Influenced a positive coalition of 12 neighbouring tribes who wanted to be custodians of the Sanctuary of God Apollo, by suggesting a peace truce in the form of an Amphictyony or a league of neighbours, with rotational leadership. This was the world's first known and arguably the most successful coalition for over 1000 years and fore-runner to the United Nations Organisation, which is a League of Nations. The international Delphic Council also models itself along these principles.

After the revival of the Olympic Games, art competitions were held from 1912 to 1948 at the initiative of Pierre de Coubertin. Competitions in various forms of art were thematically related exclusively to various forms of sport.

Also in the first half of the 20th century, there was a move to revive the Pythian Games at Delphi, at the initiative of the Greek poet Angelos Sikelianos. In 1927, the Delphic Festival was held for the first time, but the revival was then abandoned due to the cost of organising it. Delphic Festivals are held in the summer by local authorities in Delphi, focused largely on tourists.

== Founding ==
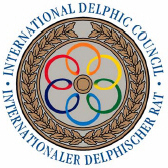
Coat of arms of the International Delphic Council, was designed and patented by J. Christian B. Kirsch, 1995

The International Delphic Council (IDC) was founded in 1994. The founder J. Christian B. Kirsch invited people from twenty Nations to Berlin to the founding congress in Schönhausen Palace, aiming to revive the Delphic Games and to provide a forum for worldwide arts and culture. Representatives were from Argentina, Austria, China, Cyprus, Ecuador, France, Germany, Greece, Kazakhstan, Libya, Liechtenstein, Lithuania, Mexico, Nigeria, Philippines, Poland, Russia, Slovakia, Switzerland, United States.

The primary symbol of the International Delphic Movement is visually different from the symbol of the Olympics, yet both have rings as the theme. The flag with the Delphic rings that are connected in a circle like a flower, was designed by J. Christian B. Kirsch and symbolises the connection of the six Delphic art categories in six different colours while denoting unity, flow, harmony and continuity.

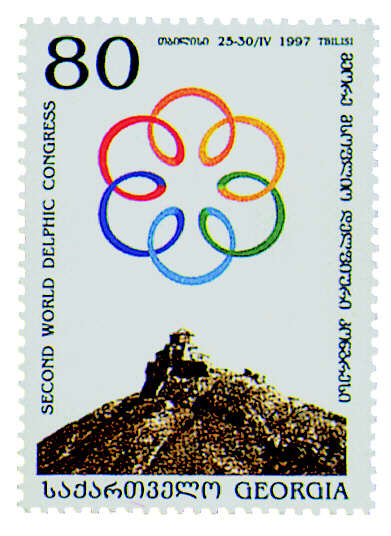
Official stamp of the II Delphic World Congress 1997 in Tbilisi. The stamp shows the emblem of the International Delphic Movement and the Georgian monastery Jvari

The first president of the IDC was Ebun A. Oyagbola of Nigeria and the immediate past President is Prof.Divina Bautista of Philippines. The incumbent Secretary General is Ramesh Prasanna of India and founder & President is J. Christian B. Kirsch of Germany, in office since 15 December 2021, elected at the XIII IDC Session in Jaipur, India.

The IDC Amphictyony or executive board is elected for two years by the General Assembly of the IDC at the bi-annual IDC Session.

The International Delphic Council has "Delphic Ambassadors", including celebrities such as Nelson Mandela (South Africa) and Lothar de Maizière (Germany) and others.

External images
- Invitation to Moscow, 21. Mai 2003
- Ambassador of Honour, Juni 2003

== Founding of the National Delphic Organizations ==
The International Delphic Council (IDC) is the reviver, regulator and chief executive body of the worldwide Delphic Network. Specially mandated individuals or association of persons with an interest in the arts and cultures establish National and Provincial Delphic Organisations (in the legal form of a council, committee, association, union, etc.) which then work with the IDC to promote arts and cultures in their regions, host and / or participate in the Delphic Games and the various other Regional, National and International Platforms of the IDC and work with their Regional or National Governments to bid for it. Upon due process of registration locally and with the IDC, they receive a formal membership certificate. Members are Artists across six Art categories, Art Lovers and the various Stakeholders that make up for the Cultural milieu.

After 1994, national chapters in Belarus, Germany, Georgia, Greece, China, Japan, Nigeria, Philippines, Russia, United States, South Korea, Malaysia, South Africa, Nigeria, India and others were particularly active. The first regional Youth Delphic Games were held in Georgia, Albania and Russia.

The National Delphic Organisations design their own logo, which includes the IDC symbol of the six interlacing rings in six colours, under guidelines laid down by the IDC. The specially designed logos and themes of these National games, are endorsed by IDC.

NDC South Korea won the bid to host the third Delphic Games 2009 in Jeju Island, followed by South Africa in Johannesburg in 2011. Delphic Games Summits took place in 2013 in Athens & Delphi in Greece, followed by the 2016 Delphic Games Summit in New Delhi, India. The decision on the venue of the next Delphic Games will be taken by vote of the members of the IDC Amphictyony and a call for bids will be initiated.

The National Delphic Organization of the host country together with the Local Government and IDC prepare for holding Delphic Games. This initiative has received greetings from Yehudi Menuhin and Elena Obraztsova, among others. The National Delphic Organisation of the host country plan, design, make themes, initiate diplomatic outreach, government alliances, sponsors, media, design merchandise and all other such activities that help stage the Delphic Games; in coordination with the IDC's Games Commission.

=== IDC and NDC Russia ===
The first National Delphic Council of Russia (NDC Russia) held its founding in December 1998 at a conference in Kursk, under mandate of the international Delphic Council, in the presence of the Founder & First Secretary General of the IDC, J. Christian B. Kirsch. The NDC Russia was registered on 19 March 1999 at the Ministry of Justice and soon afterwards officially recorded in the International Delphic Council records, in accordance with the legal IDC Statutes. On 26 June 2000, the President of NDC Russia, V. Ponyavin approached the founder & Secretary General of the IDC, J. Christian B.Kirsch, with the request to stage the first Delphic Games for adults in Moscow from 1 to 10 December 2000. This request was granted by the IDC Amphictyony.

Later due to some differences, the Russian NDC split from the International Delphic Council and formed the international Delphic Committee. Despite the withdrawal of the Russian NDC from the International Delphic Council, Russian delegations took part in the International Delphic Games in 2007 and 2009. Later, Various Russian websites and Press claimed that the Delphic idea was originated by the Russians in 2000. . This is also confirmed in the illustrated Delphic calendars of the international Delphic Council.

== Chronology of the International Delphic Games ==
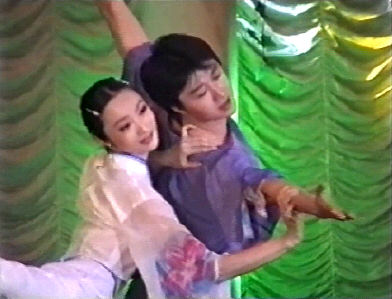
The first Delphic Games were held in 2000 in Moscow, Russia with the motto: 'New Millennium". Shan Chong and Wang Lie (China). An award for artistic achievement in contemporary dance

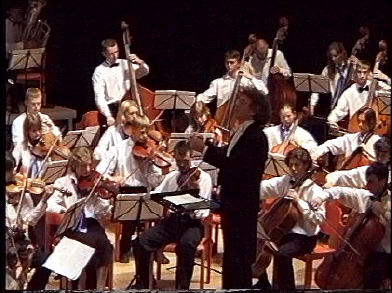
The second Junior Delphic Games was held in 2003 in Düsseldorf, Germany. State Youth Symphony Orchestra from Belarus.

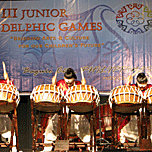
The third Junior Delphic Games was held in 2007 in Baguio, Philippines with the motto: 'building bridges with arts & cultures for our children's future'. Acoustic art competition, percussion

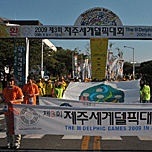
The third Delphic Games 2009 was held in 2009 in Jeju Island, South Korea with the motto: 'in tune with nature'. Parade at the streets

The IDC, organises adult and junior Delphic Games every four years - two years apart from each other in different countries.

Interested countries bid to host the games and the same is then decided by the International Amphictyony as per the IDC Guidelines for hosting the Delphic Games.

The Delphic Games is in Six Delphic Art Categories, and it is under the patronage of international institutions - the Council of Europe, UNESCO and ASEAN states.

Since 1997 seven international Delphic Games has been organized - three for adults and four for juniors.

| Year | Event | Location | Theme |
|---|---|---|---|
| 1997 | the first Junior Delphic Games | Tbilisi / Georgia | A Day of Dreams |
| 2000 | the first Delphic Games | Moscow / Russia | The New Millennium |
| 2003 | the second Junior Delphic Games | Düsseldorf / Germany | Creativity & Peace |
| 2005 | the second Delphic Games | Kuching / Malaysia | Revitalising Endangered Traditions |
| 2007 | the third Junior Delphic Games | Baguio / Philippines | Bridging Arts & Culture for our Children's Future |
| 2009 | the third Delphic Games | Jeju-si / South Korea | In Tune with Nature |
| 2011 | the fourth Junior Delphic Games | Johannesburg / South Africa | Provoke, Innovate, Inspire |

== Delphic Water Ritual ==
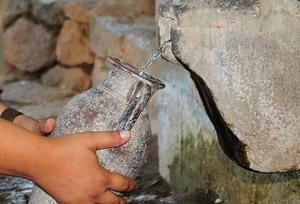
Water ceremony at the Castalian Spring in Delphi / Greece

Water symbolises the Delphic Spirit as Fire is symbolic to the Olympic Spirit. Six months prior to the Games - the Castalian Springs Ceremony is held at the castalian Springs in Delphi and travels across the world to reach the host Country. Water is symbolic of tranquility, harmony, timelessness, fluidity and purity - like the arts.

To commemorate the 15th Anniversary of the International Delphic Council (1994–2009) the establishment of a new Delphic Ritual called the Castalian Springs Ceremony was proposed at the historical and sacred Castalian Springs at Delphi. The IDC organises this Ritual with the Host Country of Delphic Games and the water is thus collected in an earthen cistern ceremoniously by re-creating an ancient practice with a hymn and a procession.

At the opening ceremony of the III Delphic Games 2009 in Jeju, Kim Tae-hwan, Jeju Governor and prominent actress Go Doo-shim, the cultural ambassador of the Jeju Delphic, exhibited a combining ritual in which two waters ― from the Castalian Spring and from the lake on the peak of Mount Hallasan ― were mixed together to celebrate a successful opening.

=== Events ===
On 14 March 2010 the International Delphic Council organised the first Delphic Games Festival during the Grand Finale Show at the ITB Berlin, the world's biggest exhibition in tourism. There was the Feast of Delphic Games under the motto: «Arts and Culture - an experience for all senses». This event corresponds to the UNESCO initiative: «2010 - International Year for the Rapprochement of Cultures».

Visitors and exhibitors had the chance to enjoy the feast of Delphic Games at the Grand Finale Show of ITB Berlin 2010.

Celebration of the Delphic Games – Grand Finale of the ITB Berlin 2010
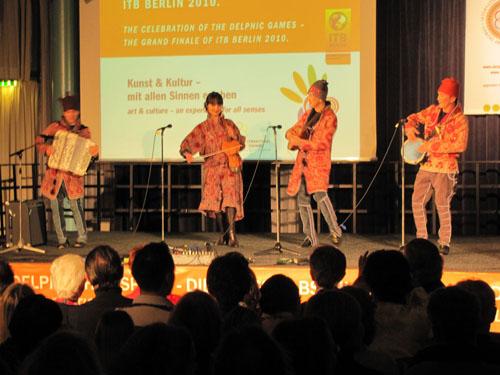
Music ethnic group «Beles». Traditional melodies (Kazakhstan)

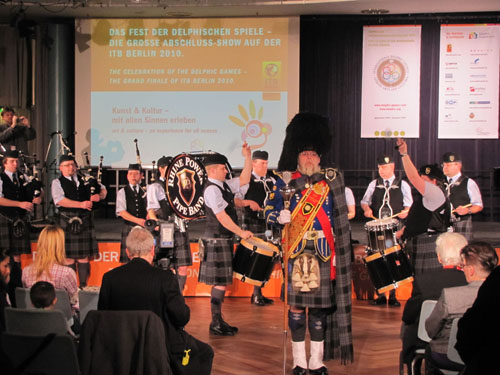
Ensemble «Rhine Power Pipe Band» (Germany). Scottish music

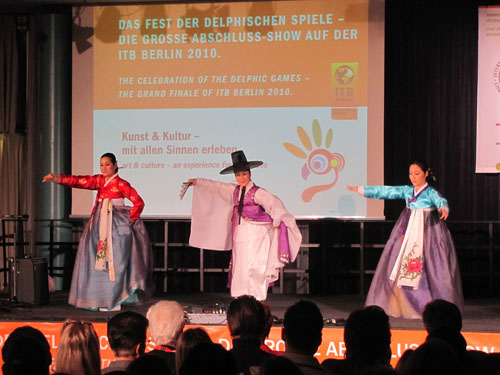
Music group «Sound of Korea». Folk songs and dances (South Korea)

In addition to the celebration of the Delphic Games Festival for the ITB Berlin in 2011, an international contest for short documentaries - the Delphic Art Movie Award 2011 was held. This was initiated by the International Delphic Council.

== Format of the Delphic Games of the Modern Era ==
=== Delphic Arts and Culture Categories ===
The International Delphic Council (IDC) and the hosting Nation's National Delphic Council (NDC) meet together and choose the disciplines out of the Six main Delphic arts categories for each of the Delphic Games. Sub-categories and Genres are then added as per the Country and participation.

- Musical Arts & Sounds (i.e. Singing, instrumental, electronic sounds ...)
- Performing Arts & Acrobatics(i.e. Dance, theater, circus ...)
- Language Arts & Rhetoric (i.e. Literature, lectures, moderation ...)
- Visual Arts & Crafts (i.e. Painting/graphics, sculpture/installation, photography/film, architecture, design, fashion, handicraft ...)
- Social Arts & Communications (i.e. Communication, internet, media, pedagogic, didactic ...)
- Ecological Arts & Architecture(i.e. Landscape and city planning, preservation and conservation of nature, buildings, memorials and monuments ...)

=== Expert Jury ===
The competitors presents and demonstrate their work in traditional or in modern arts to make the Games attractive. Independent artistic and technical experts from various arts and experiences are chosen by the Games organising Committee from around the world serve as Judges and take decision for the awards.

=== Delphic Games Prizes and awards ===
The most important elements of the Games are artistic competitions, presentations and exhibitions. Exceptional artists are honoured with special awards of the International Delphic Games such as:

- Delphic Medals Award- gold, silver and bronze for comparable Delphic art categories.
- Delphic Lyre Award - exceptional artistic individual performance as a part of a larger synthesis of the arts
- Delphic Laurel Award - for outstanding and incomparable artistic performances
- Delphic Certificate - for all active participants.

== IDC and NDC Russia ==
Russia was one of the founding members of the International Delphic Movement in 1994, along with 19 other Nations. After 2003, many Russian websites and central mass media claimed that Russia alone has revived the Delphic idea in 2000. Despite the withdrawal of the National Delphic Council from the International Delphic Council, the Russian delegations took part in the International Delphic Games in 2007 and 2009. The illustrated Delphic calendars verify these participations.

== Videos ==
- Die Delphischen Spiele 1994 - 2007
- Die ersten Delphischen Jugendspiele 1997, Tiflis / Georgien
- Die ersten Delphischen Spiele 2000, Moskau / Russland
- Die zweiten Delphischen Jugendspiele 2003, Düsseldorf / Deutschland
- Die zweiten Delphischen Spiele 2005, Kuching / Malaysia
- Die dritten Delphischen Jugendspiele 2007, Baguio City / Philippinen
- Die dritten Delphischen Spiele 2009, Jeju-si / Süd Korea
