= Hieromenia =

Time when the sacred festivals of the Greeks began

Hieromenia (sacred month's time) was the time of the month at which the sacred festivals of the Greeks began, and in consequence of which the whole month received the name of men hieros (sacred month). It was a part of the international law of Greece - that all hostilities should cease for the time between states who took part in these festivals, so that the inhabitants of the different states might go and return in safety. The Hieromeniae of the four great national festivals were the most important: they were proclaimed by heralds (spondophoroi or theoroi), who visited the different states of Greece for the purpose. The suspension of hostilities was called Ekecheiria (Truce).

In 420 BC, the Spartans were excluded from the Olympics, after they had failed to pay a fine imposed on them, when they invaded Lepreum in Elis. Spartans protested in vain that the hieromenia and ekecheiria had not been declared by heralds on them.(Thuc.5.49-55)
