= Close-Up (book) =

2022 non-fiction book by Jiwan Parajuli

- Author: Jiwan Parajuli
- Cover artist: Vijay Bashyal
- Language: Nepali
- Series: Close-Up Series
- Release number: 3,000
- Subject: Nepali Cinema
- Genre: Non-fiction
- Publisher: Thuloparda Media Pvt. Ltd.
- Publication date: March 19, 2022
- Publication place: Nepal
- Media type: Print (Hardback and paperback)
- Pages: 363
- ISBN: 978-9937-1-1147-8
- Website: https://www.thuloparda.com/books/close-up

The non-fiction book Close-up is a 2022 book authored by Jiwan Parajuli, based on the dimensions and characters of Nepali films. The book has successfully presented an insider's view of how the Nepali film industry has come to be and its evolution over the years.
