= Jiwan Parajuli =

Nepali entertainment journalist

Jiwan Kumar Parajuli
- जिवन पराजुली
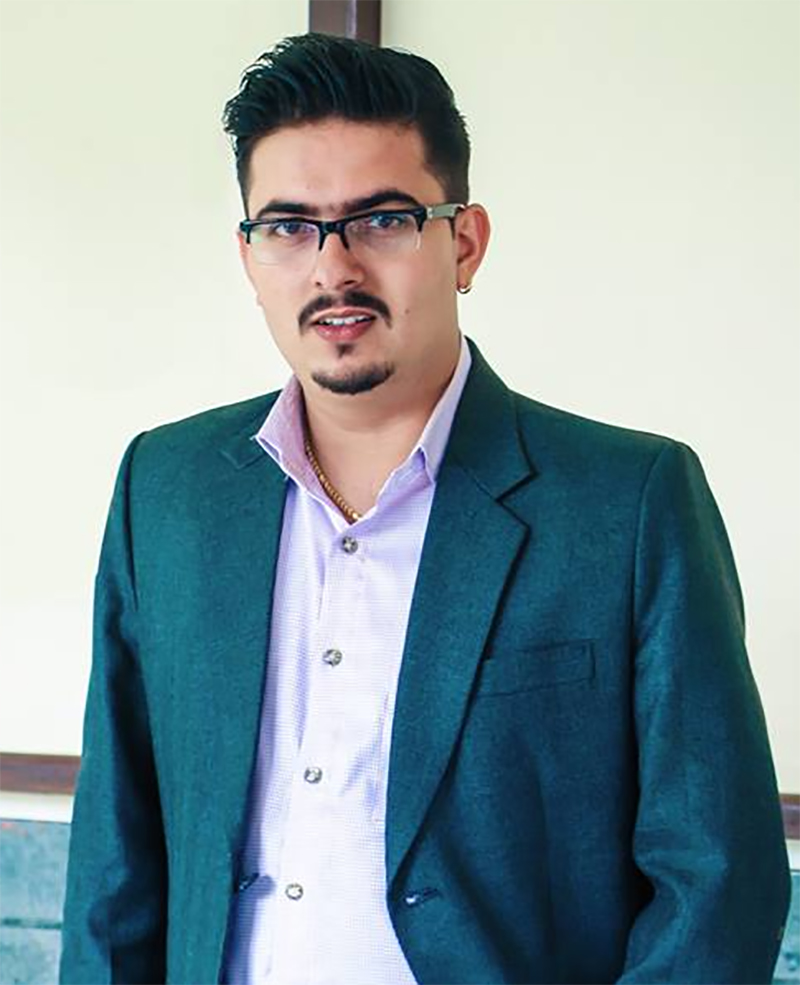
- Born: October 1 Bihadi Gaunpalika, Parbat District, Nepal
- Occupation: Journalist
- Years active: 2007 A.D.- To Present
- Organization: Thuloparda Media Pvt. Ltd.
- Known for: Entertainment Journalism
- Notable work: Author of the book 'Close-Up' & Publisher/journalist of www.thuloparda.com
- Spouse: Manju Gaire (Married 2017- Till Present)
- Children: Parth Parajuli & Pranjal Parajuli
- Awards: "Press Council Beat Journalism Award 2022": & "PIM NEPAL Excellence in Entertainment Journalism Award 2021"
- Website: http://jiwanparajuli.com.np/

Jiwan Kumar Parajuli (Nepali: जिवन पराजुली) is a Nepali entertainment journalist and author. He was born in Parbat District.

Parajuli started his journalism career at Radio Upatyaka in 2007. He is an author of Close-Up (Nepali Book), a book about the Nepali film industry. He has been awarded the Press Council Beat Journalism Award 2022, which was given by Press Council Nepal. He has also received the Excellence in Entertainment Journalism Award 2021 at the PIM Nepal Film Festival. He is a past vice president of the Film Journalist Association Nepal and current vice president of National Delphic Council Nepal.

== Jury ==
SN	Organization Name	Date	ref
1	Selection Committee Member of International Feature Film Selection Committee Nepal (Academy Awards: The Oscars)	2024 - 2030	
2	9th Nepal Africa Film Festival(NAFF)	2021	
3	Article competition on Corona Virus & Nepali Film Industry (Film Journalist Association Nepal)	2020	

== Awards ==
SN	Award Title	Organization	Ref
1	Press Council Beat Journalism Award 2022	Press Council Nepal	
2	Excellence in Entertainment Journalism Award 2021	Pim Nepal Film Festival	
