= International Delphic Committee =

Russian organization

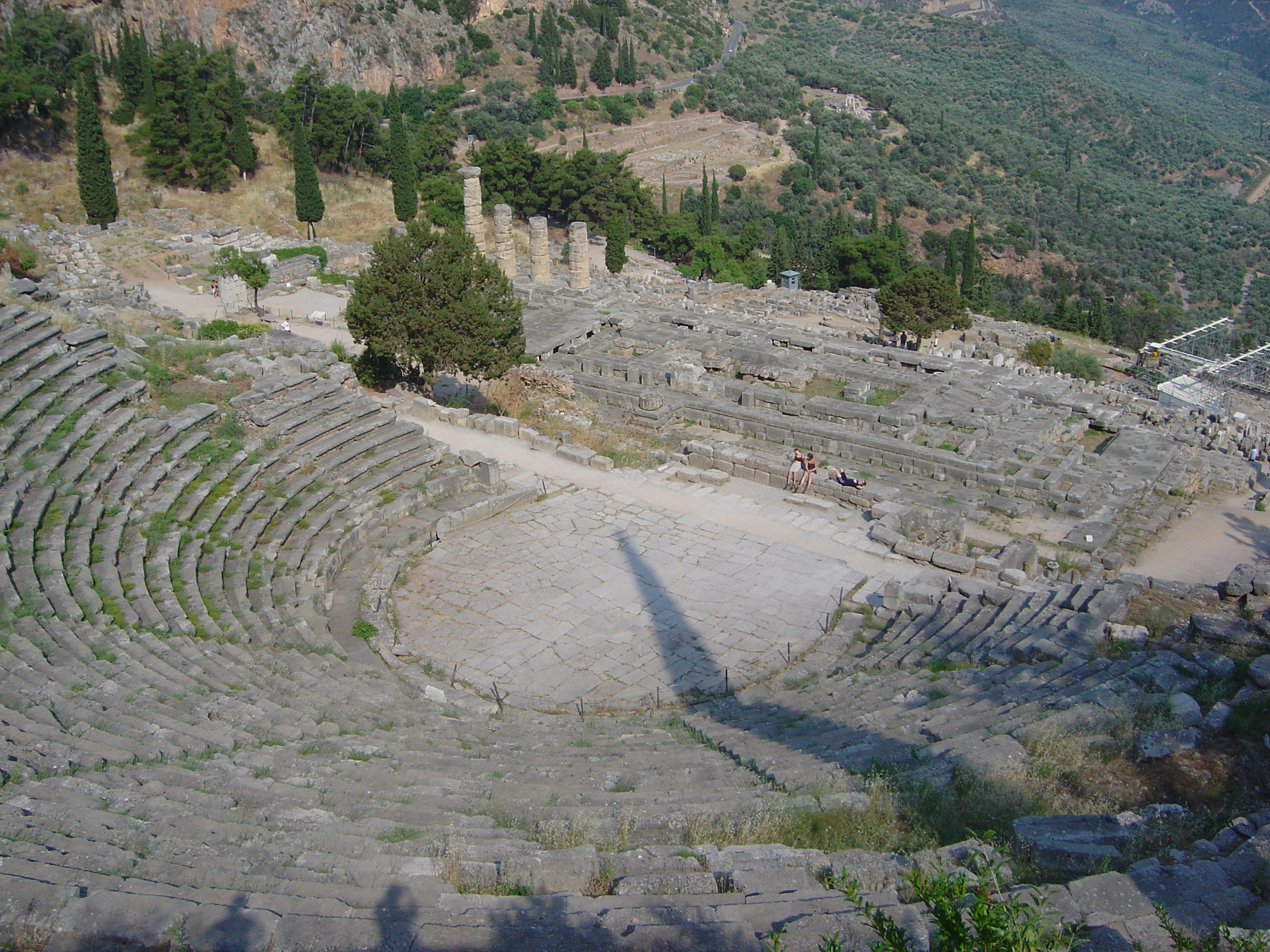
The Delphi theatre in Greece, seen from above

The International Delphic Committee is the organization which prepares and holds the modern Delphic Games. Their headquarters are located in Russia (officially registered in 2003)

Among main priorities of activities is holding the Delphic Games, popularization and development of the International Delphic Movement, search and support of young talents, promotion and development of common to all mankind values by means of art, preservation of world cultural heritage, cultural upbringing of the growing up generation.

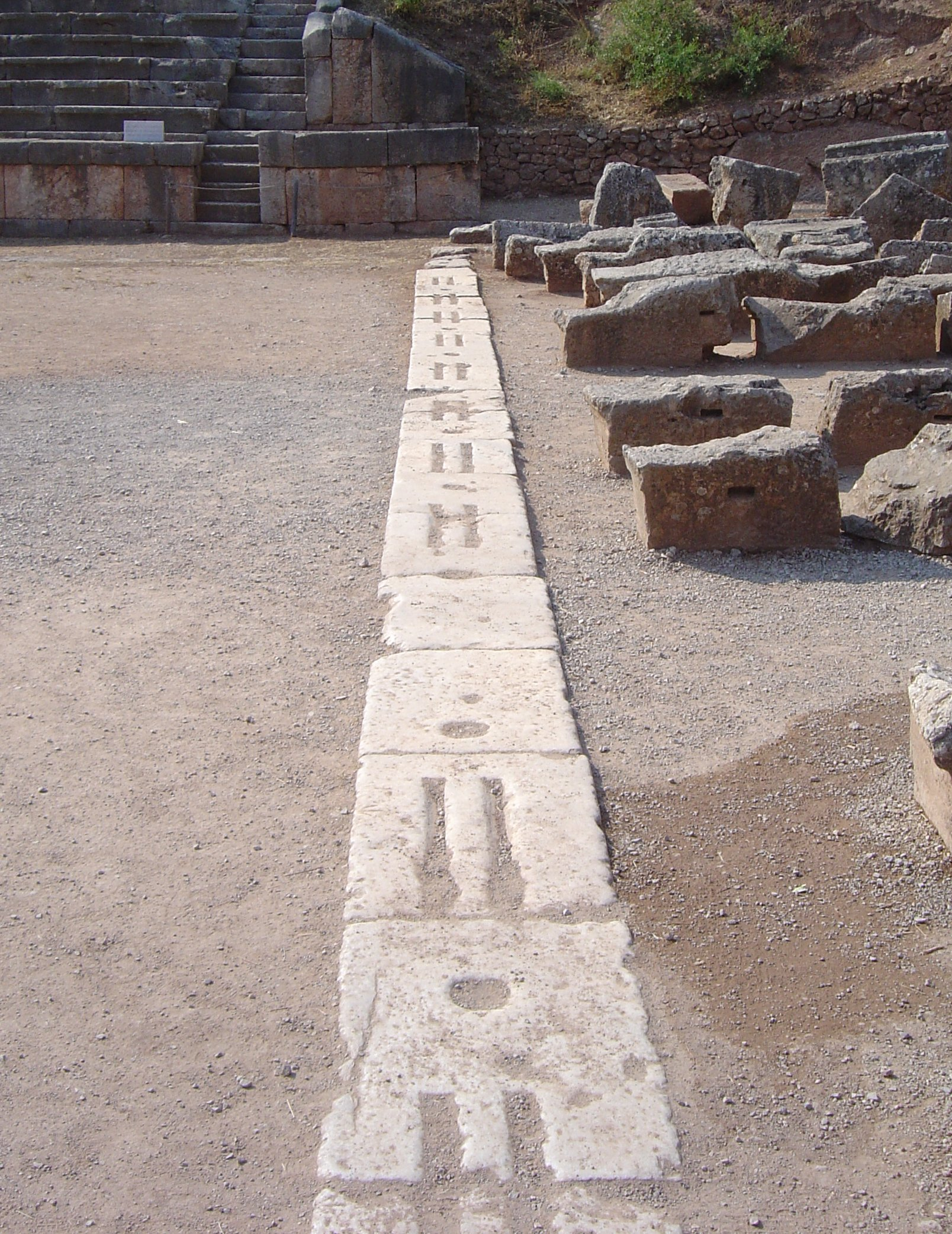
This starting line at the Delphi stadium used for the Pythian Games at Delphi, Greece has a design representative of that of many ancient Greek stadiums.

The activity of the International Delphic Committee has found support of heads of states and governments in a number of countries. Besides, the International Delphic Committee has established relations with UNESCO and the European Cultural Center of Delphi, which functions under the patronage of the Council of Europe.

Events which are held within the Delphic Movement are widely advertised and covered by more than 70 leading mass media and advertising agencies, and official opening and closing ceremonies of the Delphic Games as well as the most important nominations are broadcast by television channels live. These Junior Delphic Games are dedicated to significant domestic events. This International Delphic Committee conducted also in September 2008 the second International Delphic Games in Saratov / Russia, but some Saratov Sunday editions and news portals have questioned the status and legitimacy of the games. However, in the federal press mention of this missing.

A modern attempt to revive an ancient Greek festival Pythian Games. The history of the Delphic or Pythian Games reaches back 2600 years and took place in the year preceding the Olympic Games. The Pan-Hellenic events were dedicated to the god Apollo, who symbolised light and beauty, music, poetry, the healing arts and the Delphic oracle.

Under the patronage of the International Delphic Committee (headquartered in Moscow) and UNESCO were held the First Open Youth European Delphic Games in Volgograd city, Russian Federation, on 2–7 May 2014.
