= Pythian Games =

One of the Panhellenic Games of Ancient Greece

Coordinates: 38°28′57.60″N 22°29′52.97″E

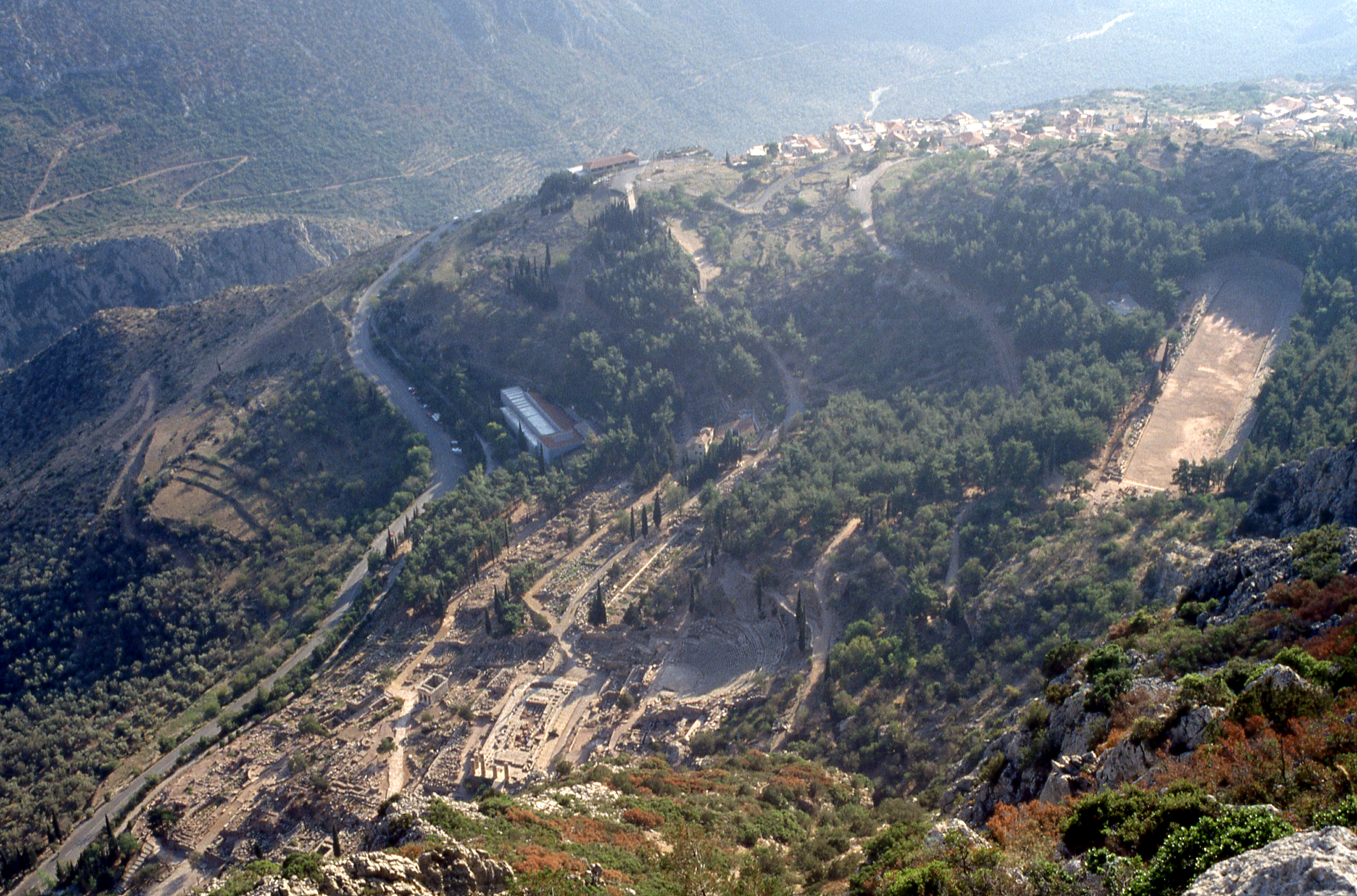
Sanctuary of Apollo with Delphic Stadium from the Phaedriades. Delphi, Greece.

The Pythian Games (Ancient Greek: Τὰ Πύθια, romanized: Ta Pythia) were one of the four Panhellenic Games of Ancient Greece. Founded circa the 6th century BCE, the festival was held in honor of the god Apollo and took place at his sanctuary in Delphi to commemorate the mytho-historic slaying of Python and the establishment of the Oracle at Delphi. The Pythian Games took place every four years, two years after the Olympic Games, and between each Nemean and Isthmian Games. They continued until the 4th century AD.

Site plan of the archaeological area of Delphi, Greece.

The Pythian Games, which were ranked second in importance behind the Olympics, primarily and originally focused on competitions for art and dance. As the Pythian Games evolved over time athletic events were added and some events allowed for the participation of women.

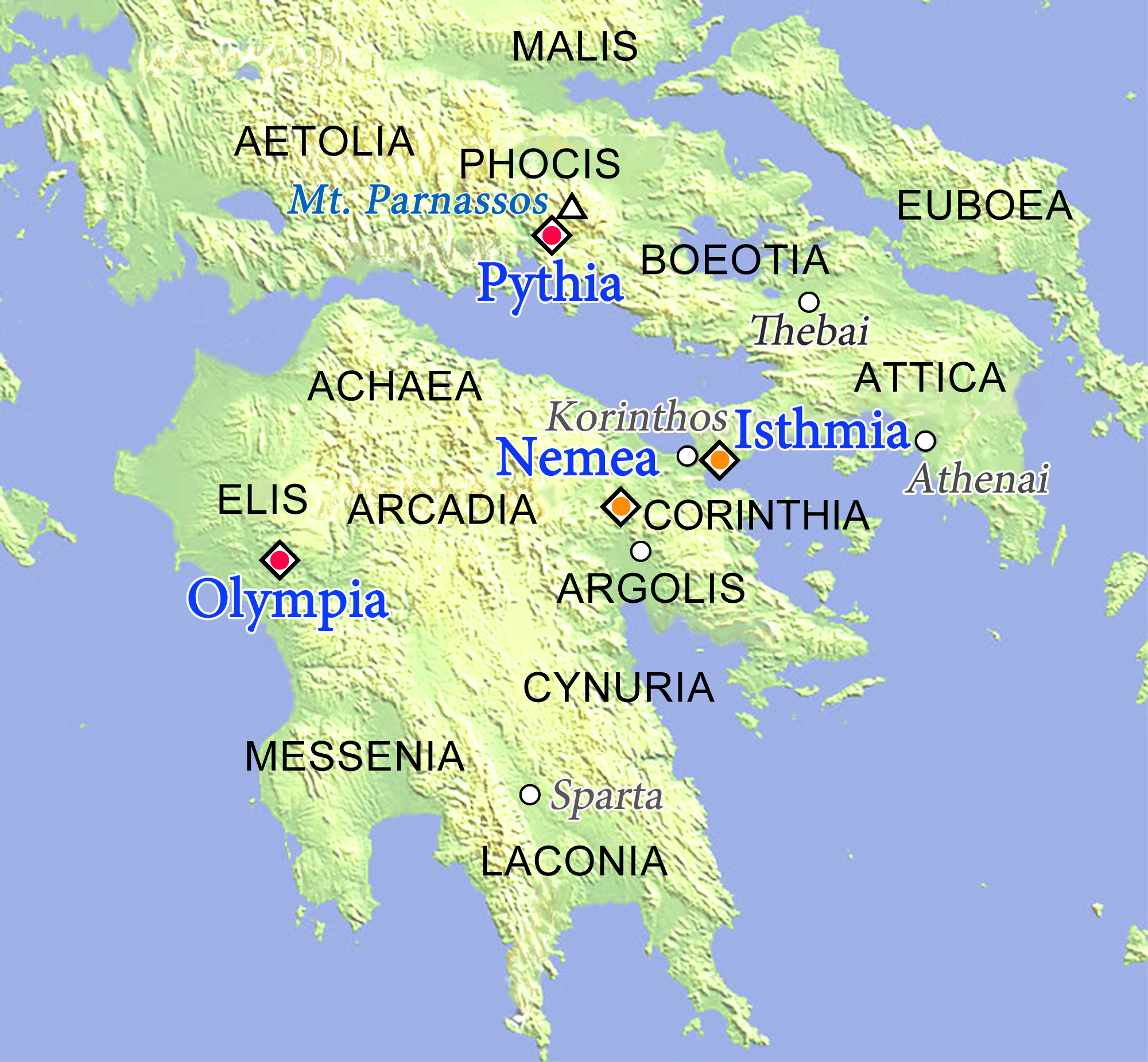
Four Panhellenic games.

== Mythical origins ==
According to ancient Greek Mythology, the Pythian Games are founded with the slaying of the mythical serpent, Python by the god Apollo in his search for a good location to establish his temple. After being directed to the area by Telphusa and coming across a spring, Python sprung forth and attacked him. Apollo slew the serpent with his bow and established the area of Delphi safe for humans and declared his ownership of the site. After burying the body, Apollo founded the oracle of Delphi. In some versions of the myth, by slaying Python, Apollo was guilty of a crime and Zeus declared that he had to make amends. In order to do so Apollo founded the Pythian Games. Other versions of the legend state that Apollo established the games to celebrate his victory over Python.

"Lest in a dark oblivion time should hide

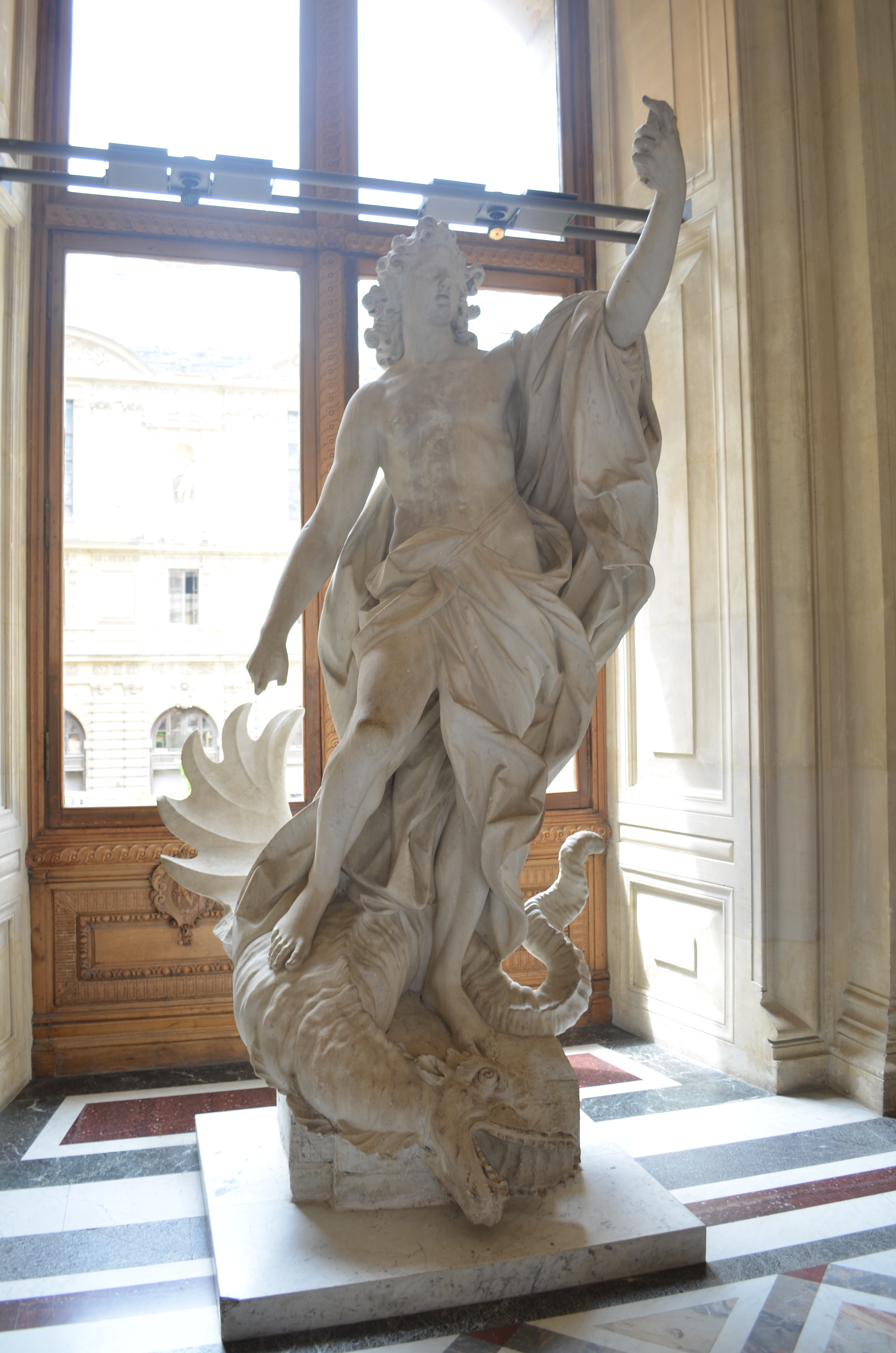
Apollo Killing Python, Louvre

the fame of this achievement, sacred sports

he instituted, from the Python called

“The Pythian Games.” In these the happy youth

who proved victorious in the chariot race,

running and boxing, with an honoured crown

of oak leaves was enwreathed. The laurel then

was not created, wherefore Phoebus, bright

and godlike, beauteous with his flowing hair,

was wont to wreathe his brows with various leaves."

-- -- Metamorphoses, 1.416-451

== History ==
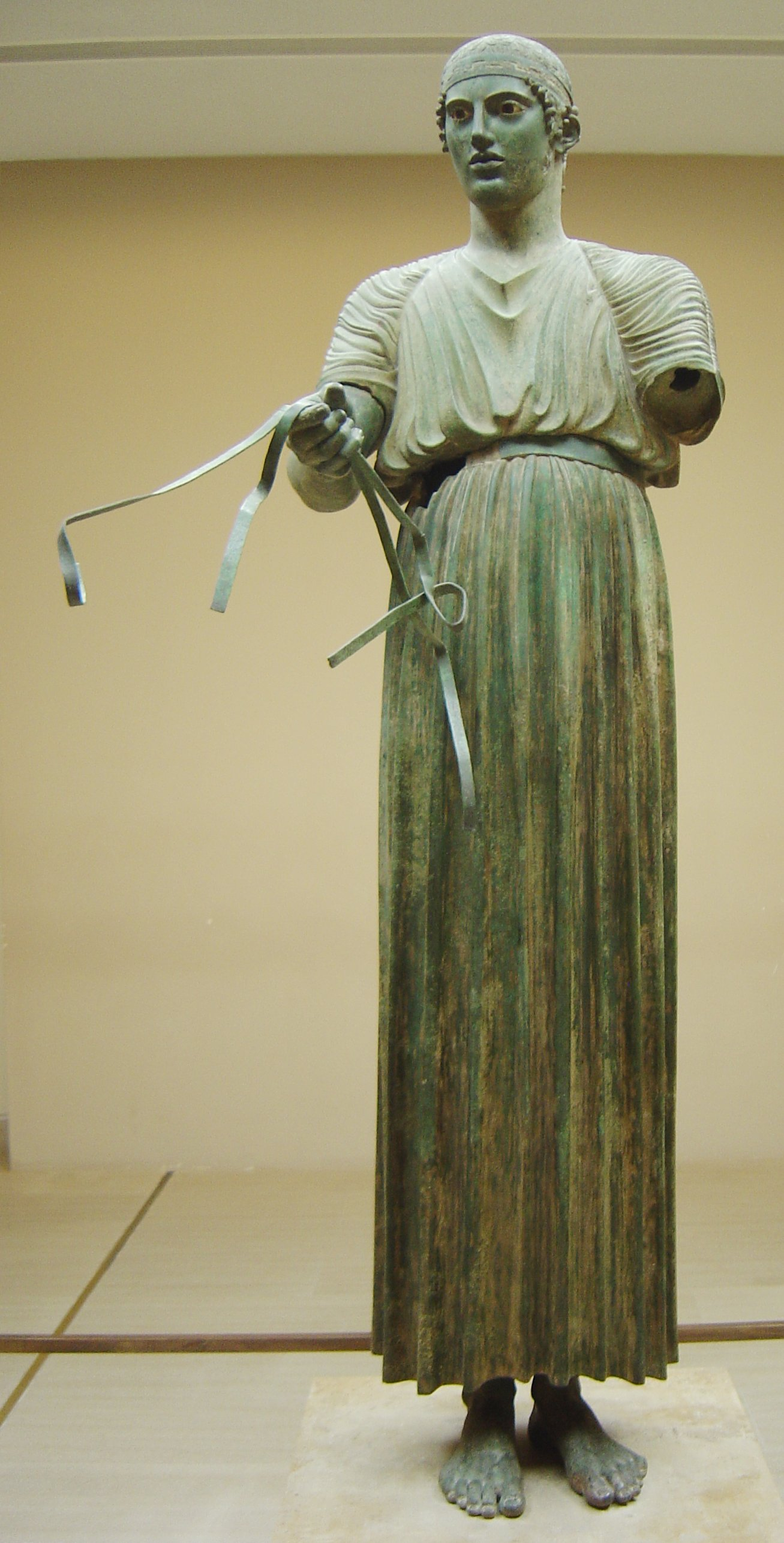
Statue of a charioteer Delphi, Greece.

Originally, the Pythian Games were held as a musical event, focused around singing a hymn in honor of the god Apollo. Later, administration of the games shifted to the Delphic Amphictyony, a council of twelve Greek tribes, and the Pythian Games were reorganized. New events were introduced, including an expansion of music focused events and the eventual introduction of athletic events. The expanded Pythian Games were first held around the end of the First Sacred War, circa 586/582 BC. It was also during this time that the Pythian Games shifted from being held every eight years as in the past, to every four years, two years before and after the Olympic Games, near the end of August.

Despite the rise of Christianity in the Roman Empire during the 4th century, Delphi remained an active pagan site and the Pythian Games continued to be celebrated at least until AD 424.

== The Games ==
=== Preparations ===
The preparations for the games began six months prior. During this time, nine Delphian theoroi, were sent out to all Greek city-cities to announce the beginning of the games.This served both to attract those who might wish to participate in the games, as well as to declare the period of the Sacred Truce or (Hieromenia). Once the Hieromenia was declared all violent conflict had to end in order to ensure safe passage to all those who wished to attend the Games. If a city was involved in armed conflict or in robberies during that period, its citizens were forbidden to enter the Sanctuary, participate in the games, or consult the Oracle. Additionally, the truce allowed the Amphictyony to focus on preparing for the games, which included restorations for all structures of the Sanctuary, from the temples to the streets and fountains. Scores of people flocked to the games from all over Greece, bringing in substantial revenue to the city.

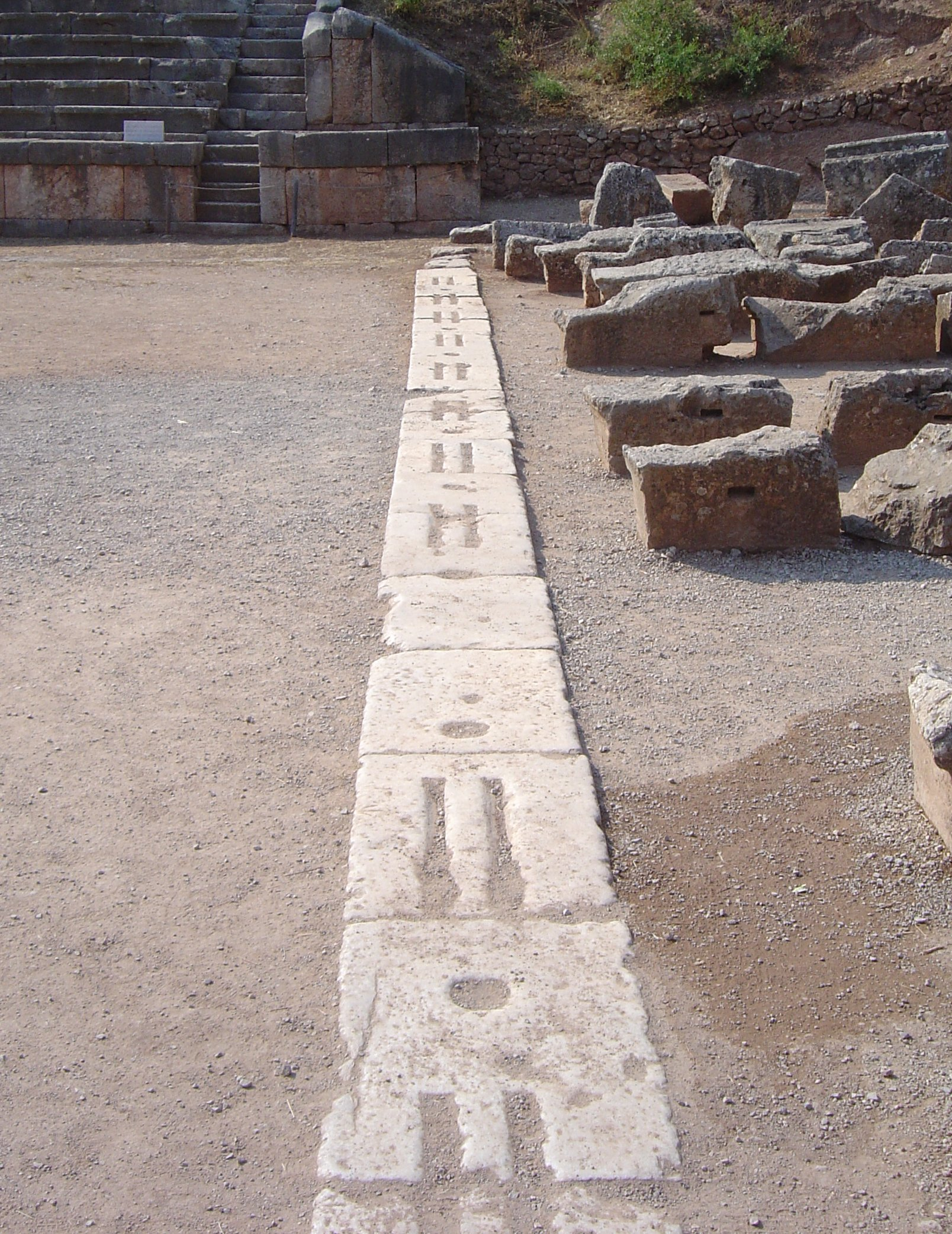
Starting line at the Delphi stadium used for the Pythian Games. Delphi, Greece.

=== Overview ===
The festival itself was held around the months of August and September. Records from Aristotle present an overview of the festivities: the Games lasted for six to eight days and were started by a reenactment of the victory of Apollo over Python. In a festive and glamorous procession, a ritual sacrifice was performed in the Temple of Apollo. After four days of festivities, the Games began..

Although the main Pythian Games took place in Delphi, smaller, informal versions of the games were held and celebrated in other cities.

The Pythian and ancient Olympic games shared many athletic and equestrian events, however the Pythinan games did not include a four-horse chariot race but did, instead add additional running races for boys.

==== Women in the Pythian Games ====
Although the ability to participate in ancient Greek athletic realms, including the Panhellenic games was limited for women, the Pythian games were an exception. Unlike at Olympia where there was a separate festival for women (the Heraean Games), women were allowed to compete at Delphi in both athletic and artistic events. Athletic events that allowed for the participation for women were most likely gender exclusive and not co-ed. The only surviving record of a female victor at the Pythian Games is Tryphosa, who won the girl's stadion running race.

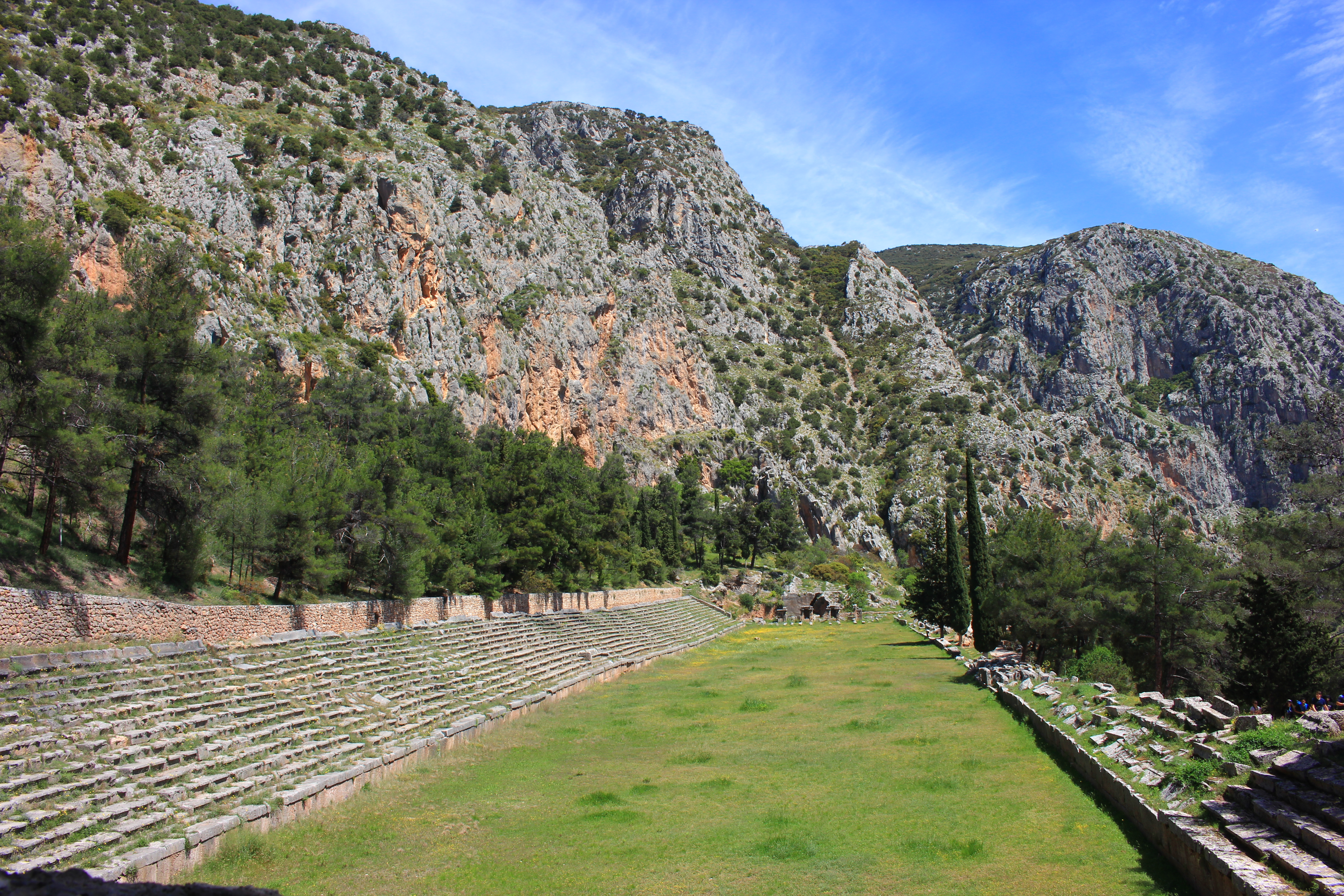
The stadium of Delphi, Greece

=== Athletic events ===
The athletic contests took place in the Stadium. Overtime, various athletic competitions were introduced, some of which were adopted from the Olympic games. At its peak, the athletic competition included four-track sports: stade, diaulos, dolichos and hoplitodromos (racing encumbered with pieces of Hoplite armor), as well as wrestling, boxing, pankration, and the pentathlon.

=== Equestrian events ===
The final day of the games was dedicated to equestrian races, which were held in a hippodrome in the plain of Krisa, not far from the sea, in the place where the original stadium was sited. (ref: Pindar). At the peak of the Pythian Games the list of equestrian events included:

- Harness racing
- Synoris - a two horse chariot race for foals (338 BC).
- A four horse chariot race (852 BC).
- Keles - a horse race for foals (314 BC).

=== Artistic events ===
==== Music ====
Musical events in the Pythian Games held prominence, as the oldest contest at Delphi was the singing of a hymn to Apollo, god of arts and music.

The first Games run by the Delphic Amphictyony, which are dated to the third year of the forty-eighth Olympiad (586 BC) featured contests of singing accompanied by cithara (a lyre). The introduction of a cithara contest without vocals was made during eighth Pythian Games.

Contests for playing the aulos (a double-reeded wind instrument) both solo and accompanied and contests for singing to the aulos were added. The latter of these was abolished by the second Games because the music was considered "ill-omened" with dismal tunes accompanied by lamentations.

Pythocritus of Sicyon was aulos victor at six consecutive festivals, the only player so to distinguish himself. His playing accompanied the pentathlon at the Olympics where a statue was erected to him.

==== Poetry, prose and drama ====
Poetry and prose contests were another feature of the Pythian Games. These events were held in a theater above the Temple of Apollo. A panel of judges chose victors. Contests of Tragic acting probably involved both individual performances and dramatic productions.

==== Painting ====
Painting competitions were introduced in the mid-5th century BC.

==== Later Roman additions ====
In the Roman period theatrical competitions were introduced, carried out in the late-Hellenistic theater.

=== Prizes ===
During the primary years of the Pythian games, where there were fewer events and the competitions were music based, prizes were given to the victors. These prizes may have consisted of golden tripods. As the games evolved and expanded and grew more popular across the ancient Greek world, prizes ceased to be handed out. In 582 BC the Pythian games became "stephanitic" or "crown" games. As such, no monetary prizes were awarded to winners of the Pythian Games. Instead they received a wreath of bay laurel, sacred to Apollo, from the Vale of Tempe, in Thessaly.

== Pindar and the Pythionikoi ==
Pindar, a well renowned Theban poet, composed 45 poems in honor of the victors of the Panhellenic games. Of those poems, 12 were composed for the winners of the Pythian games and titled Pythionikoi. These poems, which were primarily focused on recounting the honor and glory of the victors, also praised their families. Furthermore, the poems provide insight into the aristocratic and athletic ideals of the late archaic period.

=== The Pythionikoi as a source of information ===
Pindar worked on lyric poetry. The largest part of his surviving works is the Victory Odes (Epinikia), chorus songs to be sung in the homeland of the winner of the Games upon his return.

The Greek aristocracy of the first half of the 5th century BC, mainly the tyrants of Sicily and the conservative aristocracy of Aegina, constituted the clientele of the poet. Thus, his Odes of Victory reflect the aristocratic ideals which were losing ground so fast. The winner's laudation is reinforced by adding mythological details. However, a prerequisite for understanding and cherishing the poems is a well-educated audience. The poet uses his work not only to speak of the victory won by his client and his family, but also to accentuate the family's history and its connections all over Greece.

Based on the surviving 12 Pythian Victory odes and the information they describe a list of the known winners and the events they won can be established:

In 498 B.C. Hippokles from Thessaly won at the children's diaulos (10th Pythionicus).

In 490 B.C. Midas from Akragas won at the musical contests as a flute player (12th Pythionicus).

In 486 B.C. Megakles from Athens won at the chariot racing (7th Pythionicus).

In 475 (?) and in 474(?) B.C. Hieron of Syracuse won the chariot racing (2nd Pythionicus).

In 474 Thrasydaeus from Thebes won at the children's stadium (11th Pythionicus) and Telesikrates from Cyrene won at the armed race (9th Pythionicus).

In 470 B.C. Hieron from Aetna won at the chariot racing (1st Pythinicus).

In 462/1 B.C. Arkesilaus from Cyrene won at the chariot racing (4th and 5th Pythionikoi).

In 446 B.C. Aristomenes of Aegea won the boys' wrestling contest (8th Pythianicus).

== Modern day Pythian Games ==
Since the official end of the ancient Pythian Games there have been several attempts at its revival. Recently, indian Bijender Goel has founded a modern global Pythian Games inspired by the Ancient Pythian Games. These games will be focused not only on athletics but on celebrating culture, heritage, music, dance, and art.
