= Vehicle registration plates of Germany =

Germany
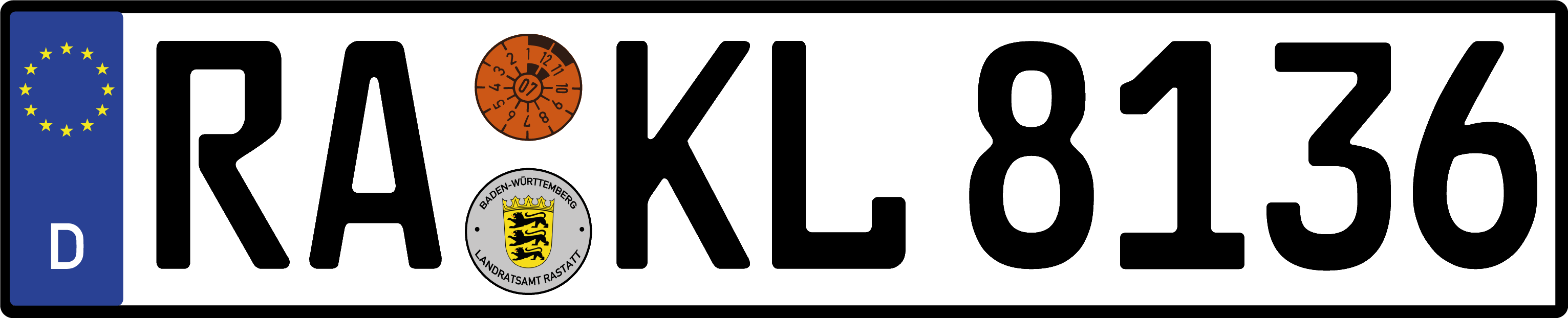
- German number plate, current format (FE-style)
- Country: Germany
- Country code: D

Current series
- Size: 520 mm × 110 mm 20 1/2 in × 4 3/8 in
- Serial format: Not standard (max 8 characters)
- Colour (front): Black on white
- Colour (rear): Black on white
- Introduced: 1956

History
- First issued: 1906

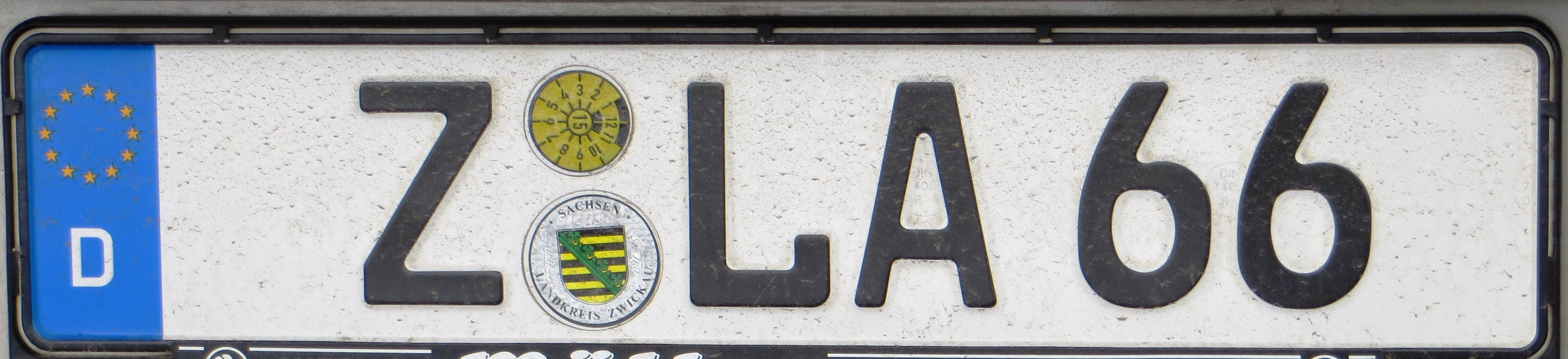
1-letter area code Z for Zwickau

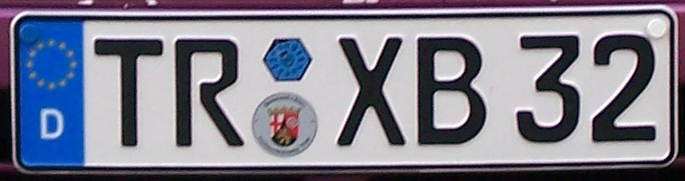
2-letter area code TR for Trier

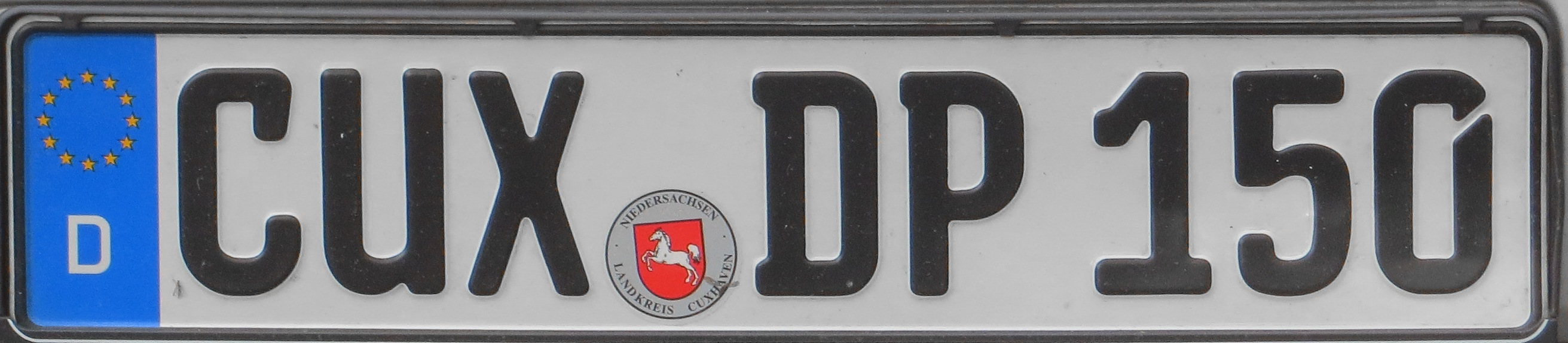
3-letter area code CUX for Cuxhaven

Vehicle registration plates (German: Kraftfahrzeug-Kennzeichen or, more colloquially, Nummernschilder) are mandatory alphanumeric plates used to display the registration mark of a vehicle registered in Germany. They have existed in the country since 1906, with the current system in use since 1956. German registration plates are alphanumeric plates in a standardised format, issued officially by the district authorities.

All motorised vehicles participating in road traffic on public space, whether moving or stationary, have to bear the plates allotted to them, displayed at the appropriate spaces at the front and rear. Additionally, the official seals on the plates show their validity which can also be proven by the documentation coming with them. Motorcycles and trailers carry only a rear plate.

A significant feature of German vehicle registration plates is the area code, which can be used to tell the district of registration. It has developed into a widespread habit in Germany, even a children's game when travelling, to guess "where that vehicle is from".

== Format and legal requirements ==
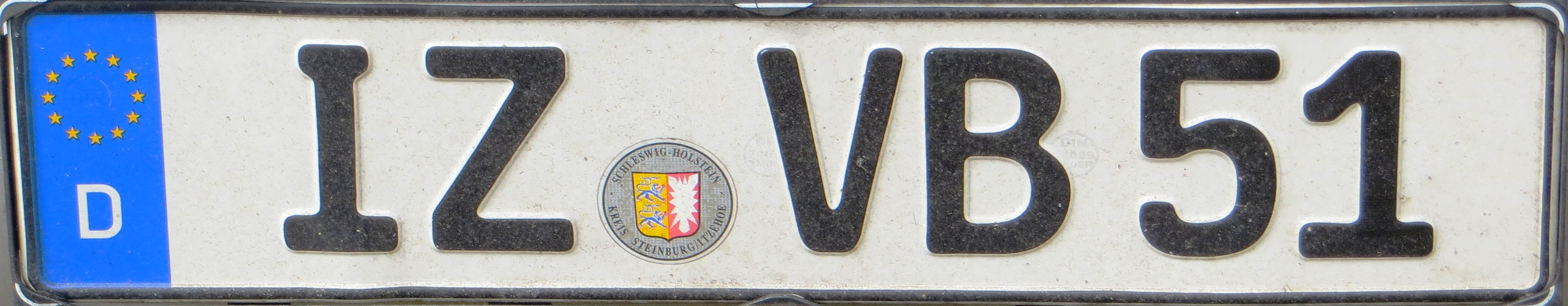
Number plate in post-1994 format (FE-style) (Note: Front plate, post-2010 hence without sticker; coloured registration seal of Steinburg district)

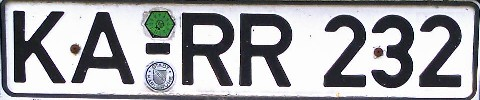
Number plate in pre-1994 format (DIN-style), no longer issued but still in use (Note: Front plate with emission test sticker (valid July 1994) and silver registration seal "Stadt Karlsruhe")

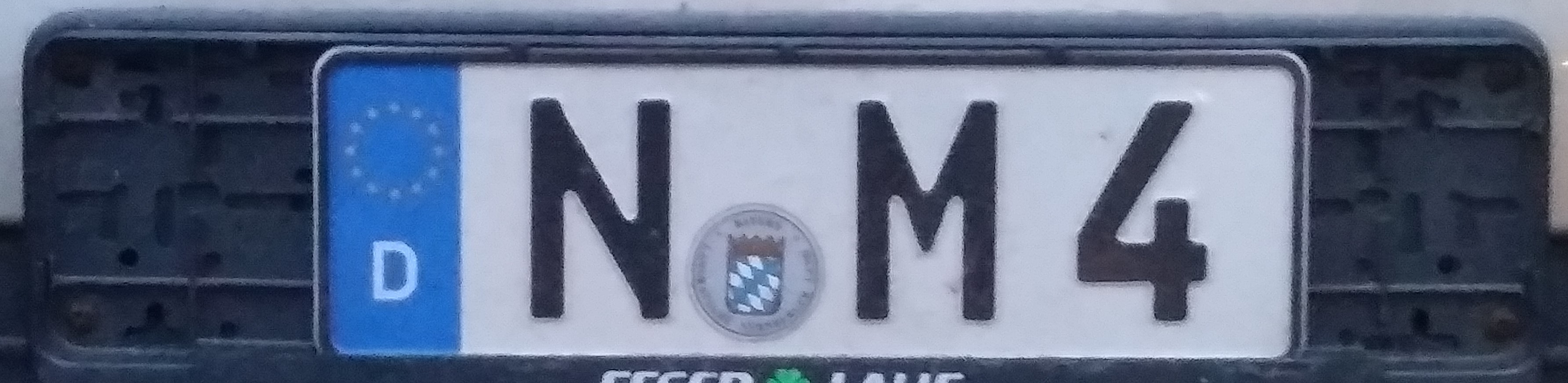
Number plate with few characters, hence shorter than standard 520×110

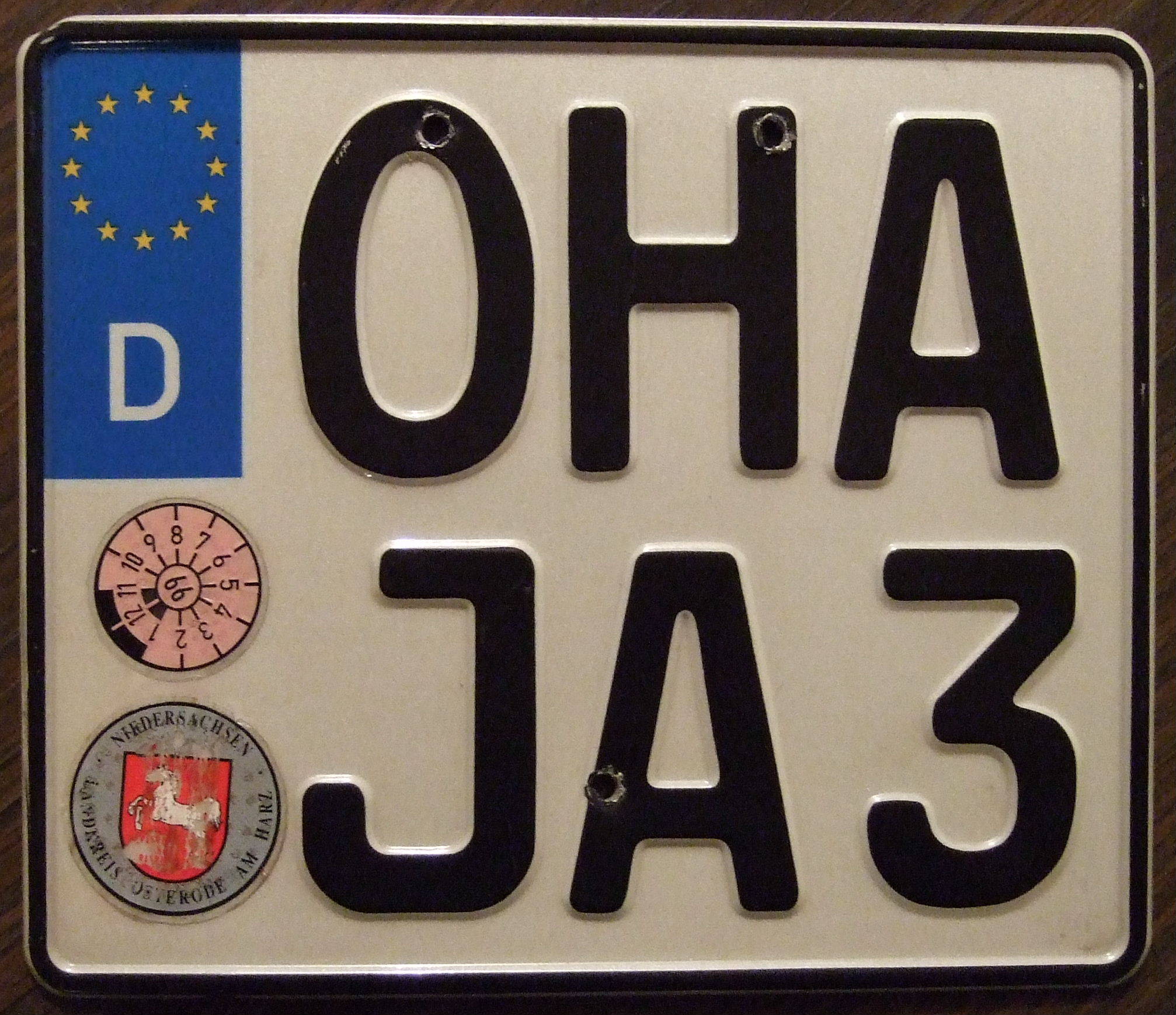
Number plate for motorcycles, issued until 2011 (280×200) (Note: Used on a motorcycle, from Osterode am Harz)

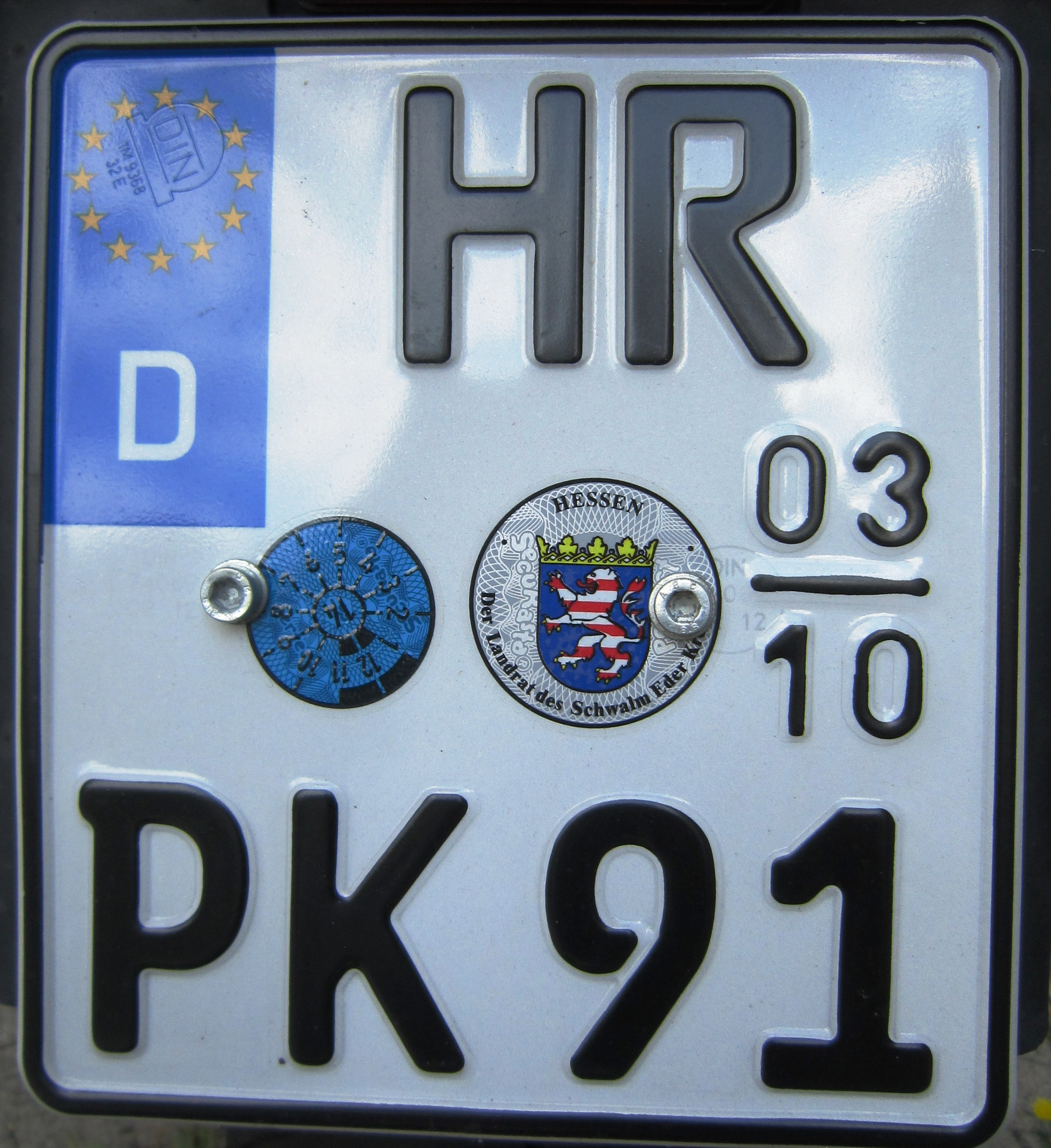
Number plate for motorcycles, issued since 2011 (200×220) (Note: seasonal plate, valid March to October every year)

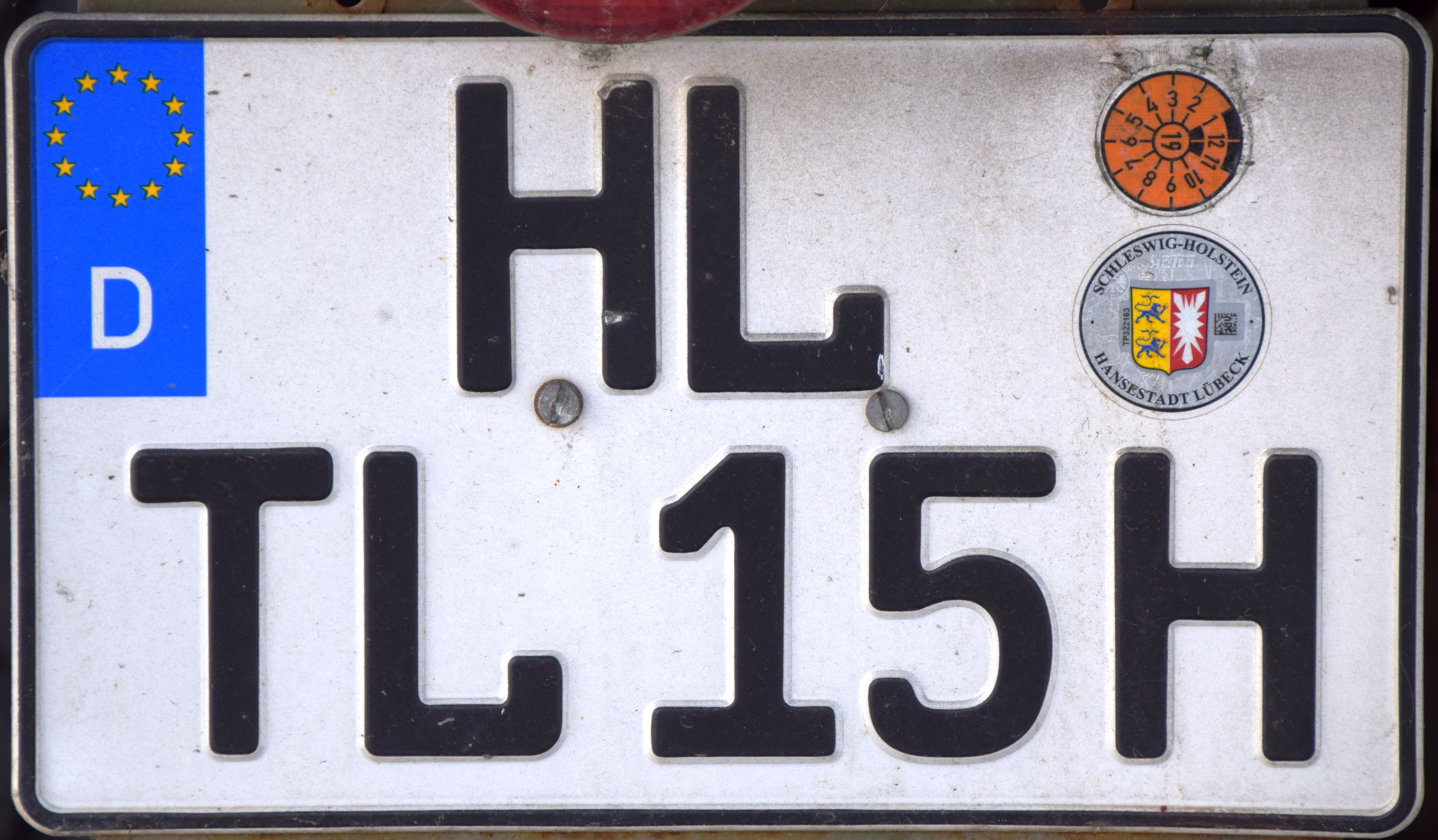
Small number plate (255×130) (Note: from Hansestadt Lübeck, final letter H for historic)

=== Legal ===
The legal requirements for these licence plates are laid down in a federal law titled Verordnung über die Zulassung von Fahrzeugen zum Straßenverkehr (Ordinance on the admission of vehicles for road traffic), or in the shortened version Fahrzeug-Zulassungs-Verordnung, FZV which replaced part of an older law named Straßenverkehrszulassungsordnung, StVZO (Note: Literally, "Road-Traffic-Admission-Ordinance", cf. German compounds) in 2011. The law distinguishes between Kennzeichen meaning a specific combination of letters and digits, and Kennzeichenschilder which are the physical licence plates. In everyday language, these terms are often replaced indifferently by Nummernschild and rarely is the difference emphasized by restricted use of either Nummer or Schild.

=== Physical characteristics ===
German number plates are rectangular, with standard dimensions 520 mm × 110 mm (20 1/2 in × 4 3/8 in) for cars, trucks, buses and their trailers. Plates bearing few characters may have reduced length but must retain the size and shape of the characters. Plates in two lines for the said types of vehicles (Note: As necessary e.g. on certain cars, such as the rear of a Volkswagen Beetle) measure 340 mm × 200 mm (13 3/8 in × 7 7/8 in). Motorcycles also have plates in two lines but with specific dimensions: Plates for "large motorcycles" (engine displacement over 125 cc or power output exceeding 11 kW (15 bhp)) issued until 2011 combine a size of 280 mm × 200 mm (11 in × 7 7/8 in) with characters of the same size as used for car plates, while those issued since 2011 have characters of reduced size and measure either 180 mm × 200 mm (7 1/8 in × 7 7/8 in) or 220 mm × 200 mm (8 5/8 in × 7 7/8 in). Plates for "light motorcycles" (Leichtkrafträder up to 125 cc and 11 kW (15 bhp)) combine a size of 255 mm × 130 mm (10 in × 5 1/8 in) with characters of reduced size. This smallest size of plates is also used for agricultural tractors with a maximum speed of 40 km/h (25 mph) and their trailers and may also be issued as an exception for certain import cars, when a plate of regular size cannot be applied at the available space.

The characters on the licence plate, as well as the narrow rim framing it, are black on a white background. In standard size they are 75 mm (3 in) high, and 47.5 mm (1 7/8 in) wide for letters or 44.5 mm (1 3/4 in) wide for digits. The smaller plates bear characters of 49 mm (1 7/8 in) height and 31 or 29 mm (1 1/4 or 1 1/8 in) width, respectively. In the current system, introduced in 1956, they consist of an area code of one, two or three letters, followed by an identifier sequence of one or two letters and one to four digits. The total quantity of characters on the plate must not exceed eight. Identifiers consisting of one letter with one- or two-digit numbers are often reserved for motorcycle use since there is less space for plates on these vehicles, especially before the reduction of plate size to 180 × 200 mm and 220 × 200 mm in 2011.

==== Typeface ====
Modern German plates use a typeface called FE-Schrift (fälschungserschwerende Schrift, tamper-hindering script). It is designed so that the letter P cannot be altered to look exactly like an R, and vice versa; nor can the F or the L be forged to equal an E, etc. Another feature is the equal width of all characters, different from the old DIN 1451 script which had been in use since the introduction of the current system in 1956. FE-Schrift can be read by OCR software for automatic number plate recognition more easily than DIN 1451.

The present style was introduced in 1994 and became mandatory in 2000, so the number of licence plates issued in the old style has become very rare. As with many plates for countries within the European Union, a blue strip on the left shows a shortened country code in white text (D for Deutschland = Germany) and the Flag of Europe (12 golden stars forming a circle on a blue background).

==== Material ====
Traditionally, German licence plates are made of aluminium sheeting, with embossed characters rising above background level. Over the years, however, various other materials have been used, albeit to a small extent only. Since 2013, a new style of plates made of plastic is allowed. They are said to be less sensitive to mechanical damage and to cause less CO_{2} emission in their production, but are more expensive.

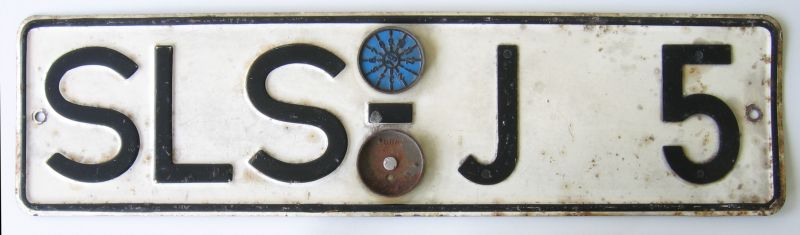
Licence plate with part-plastic (1964); plate and area code are embossed whereas the identifier characters (J 5) are riveted on.

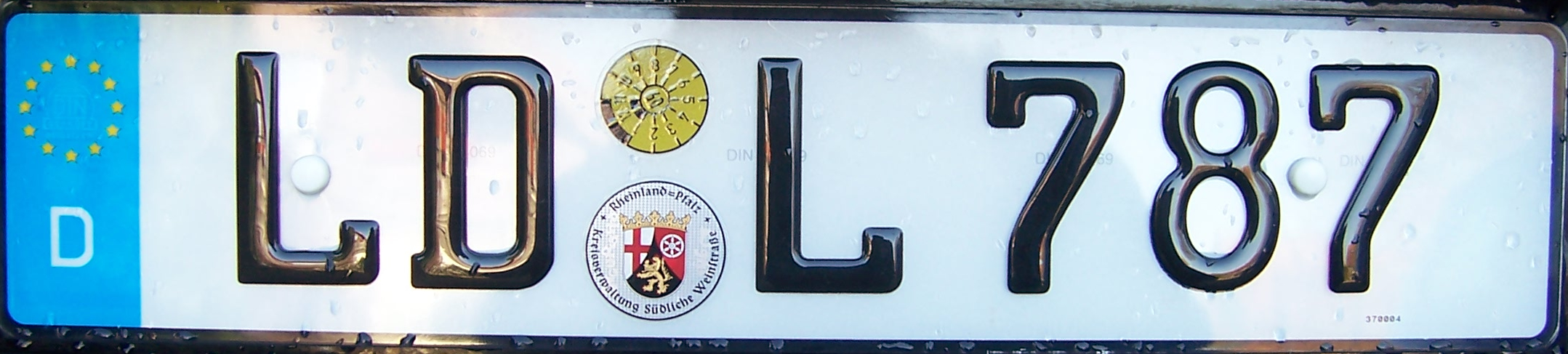
All-plastic plate (2008)

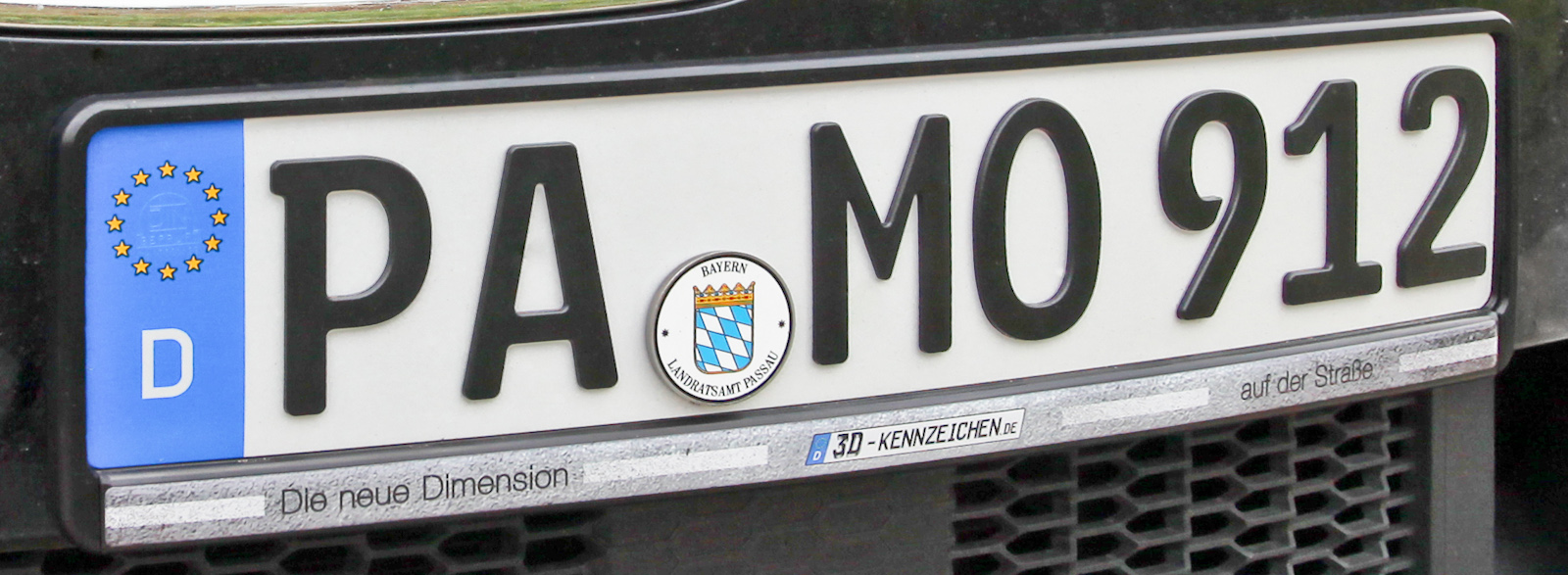
Plastic licence plate (2013), characters clipped on

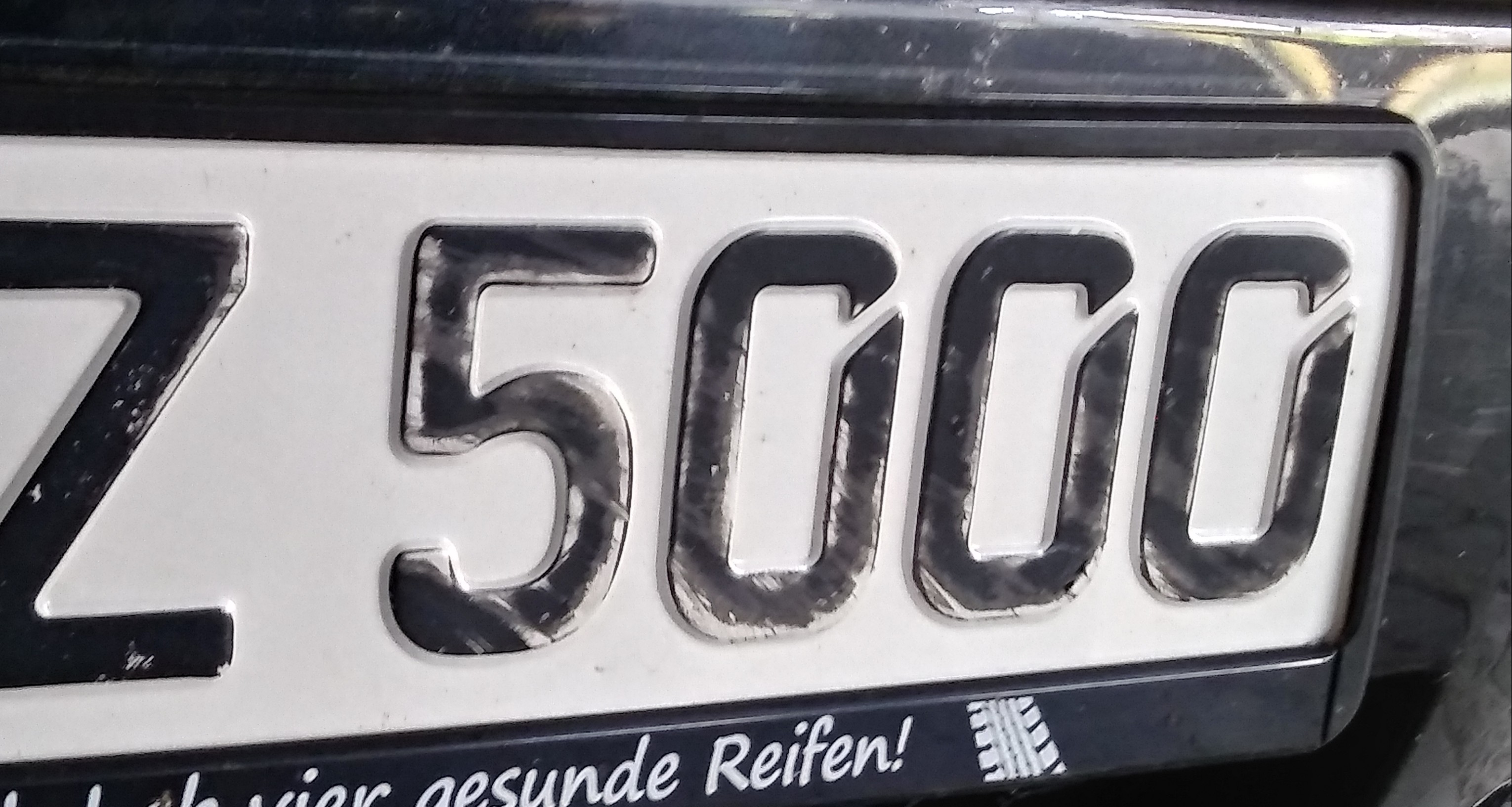
Detailed view of all-metal plate, characters partly worn off

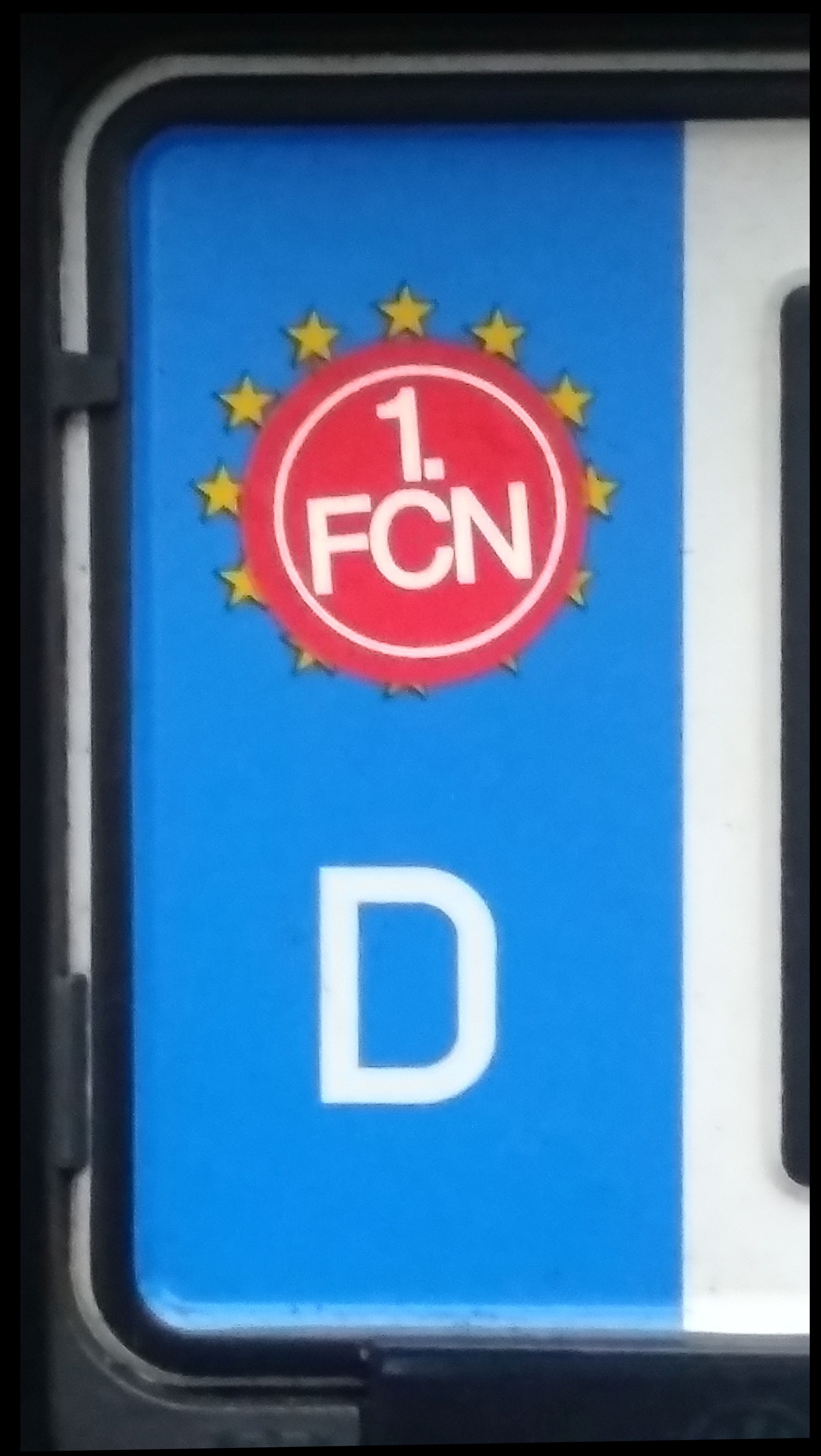
FCN sticker on a licence plate (not exactly legal)

Number plates are retroflective, but must not be mirroring, concealed or soiled, nor may they be covered by glass, foil or similar layers. Occasionally, drivers who adorn their licence plate with a badge of their favourite football club are fined and ordered to restore the original state.

== Constituent elements ==
Map of German districts and their licence plate codes

=== Area code ===
The first part or Unterscheidungszeichen consists of one, two or three letters representing the district where the car was registered, such as B for Berlin or HSK for Hochsauerlandkreis. These letters basically refer to the German districts, yet after some changes in the law they are no longer unambiguous. When the current system was introduced, each district was assigned exactly one abbreviation. Whenever a district was merged with another or changed its name, their area code would be redefined. Whereas existing registrations would remain valid, any vehicle registered henceforth could only be issued the current code. (Note: When the districts of Eutin and Oldenburg in Holstein merged to form the new district of Ostholstein, in 1970, both their codes EUT and OLD became obsolete and were replaced by OH.) In some cases an urban district and the surrounding non-urban district share the same letter code. Usually, these are distinguished by different letter/digit patterns. (Note: The urban district of Straubing has had one letter after the area code (SR-A 123), whereas the surrounding district Straubing-Bogen has two letters (SR-AB 123) in this place.) The assignment of each code and combination is registered with the Zentrales Fahrzeugregister (ZFZR).

Since 2013, however, area codes long abolished were re-introduced, revoking the rule of unambiguity. In consequence, many districts now use more than one code, (Note: Up to 9 in Mecklenburgische Seenplatte (district): MSE, AT, DM, MC, MST, MÜR, NZ, RM, WRN) and certain codes, on the other hand, are not assigned to one district only. (Note: ESB, formerly standing for Eschenbach district, is now issued by the districts of Neustadt a.d. Waldnaab, Amberg-Sulzbach, Bayreuth and Nürnberger Land.) Likewise, several cities that share their code with the surrounding rural (Note: The term "rural district" does not necessarily denote rural surroundings or landscape but rather refers to the fact that the municipalities belonging to a "rural" district lack certain administrative rights of an "urban" district, such as issuing registration plates. These rights are exercised by the district office.) districts have started using any available codes for both districts without any distinction; the city of Regensburg, for example, and the surrounding rural district of Regensburg used different systems with their code R only until 2007.

Germany includes diacritical marks in the letters of some codes, that is the letters Ä, Ö, and Ü, (Note: This habit is uncommon in most other European countries but does appear on regular Montenegrin, Croatian and Serbian (letters Đ, Č, Ć, Š and Ž), Åland registration plates (letters Å, Ä and Ö), as well as on Finnish, Swedish (letters Å, Ä and Ö) and Danish (letters Æ, Ø and Å) personal registration plates.) but not ẞ. (Note: The letter ß does not occur in the beginning of any word and therefore did not have an upper-case form before 2008.) For a long time, German codes kept to the rule that a code with an umlaut would prohibit another code with the respective blank vowel, e.g. there could not be a district code FU as the code FÜ was already in use for Fürth. This rule was disregarded in 1996, when BÖ was introduced for Bördekreis in spite of BO existing for Bochum. However Bördekreis got BK in 2007, probably because of confusions abroad, for fines etc. (Note: It may be argued that "there has to be a principle that two vehicles can't share the same letter-number combination, even if disregarding the dash (shown as blank on plates). So if a car has SR-A 123, no car can have S-RA 123. Otherwise this would violate the Vienna Convention on Road Traffic annex 2 which says that letters and numerals are used for registration numbers, but not that spaces or dashes are significant." – However this principle has not been revealed yet, cf. discussion.)

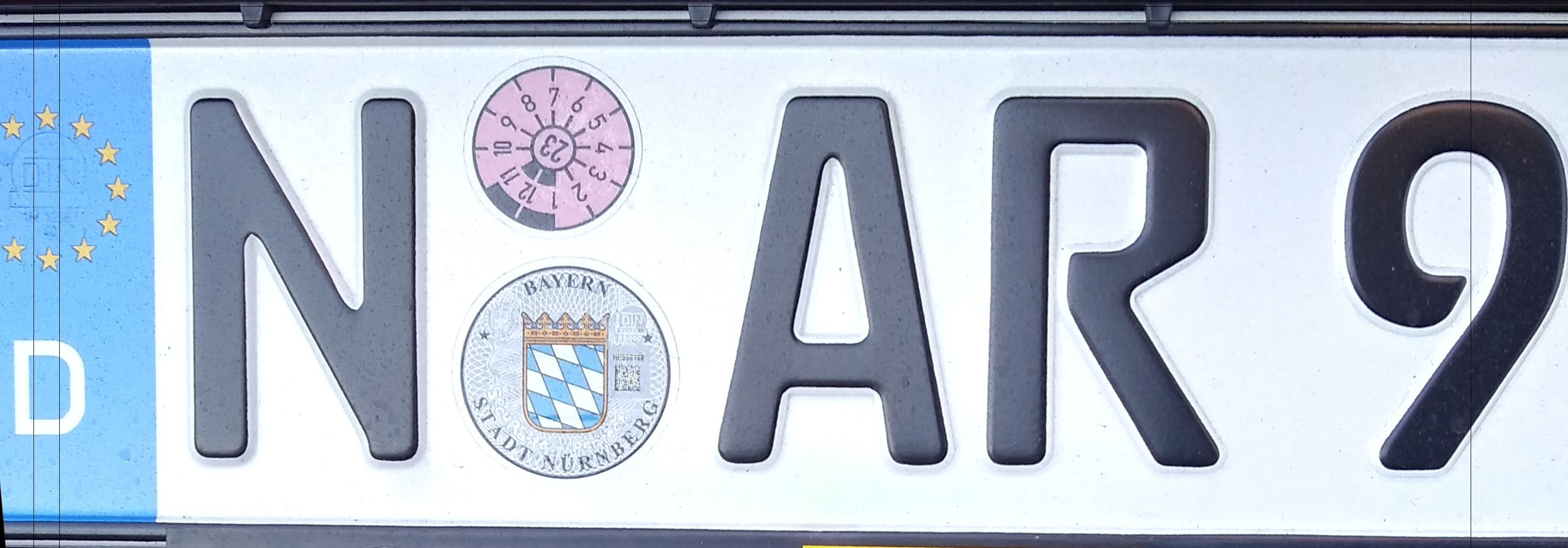
N plate with two middle letters from Nuremberg (Nürnberg) city

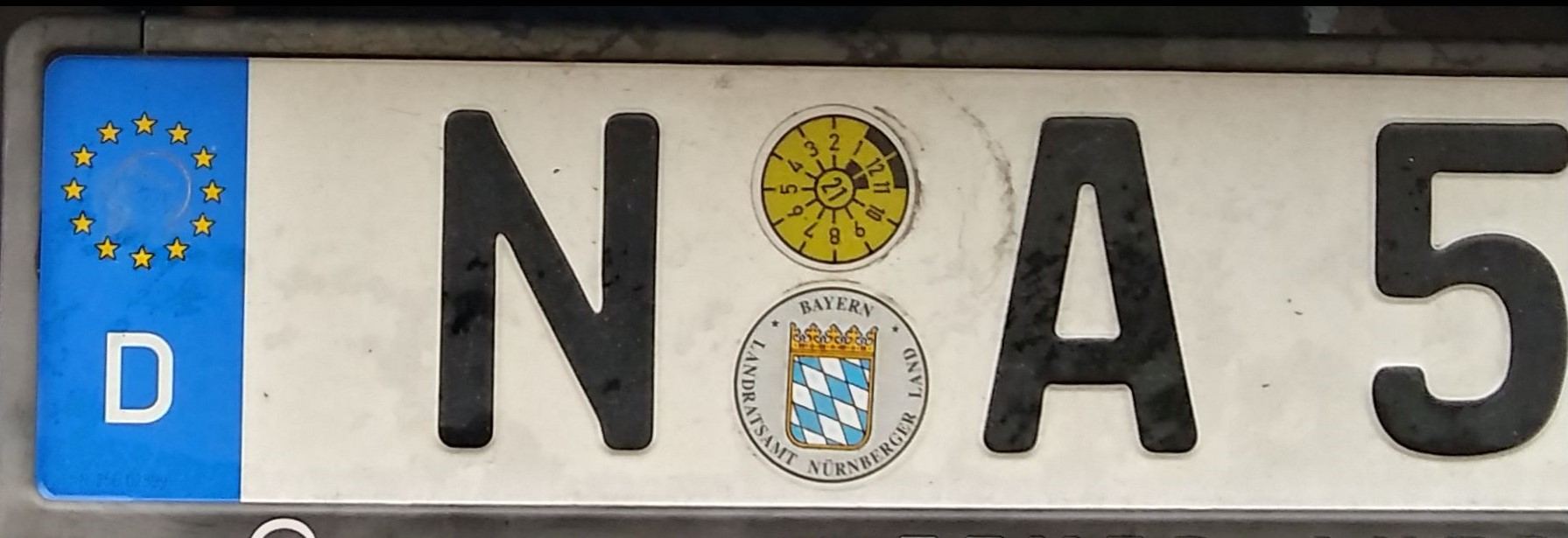
N plate with one middle letter from Nürnberger Land district

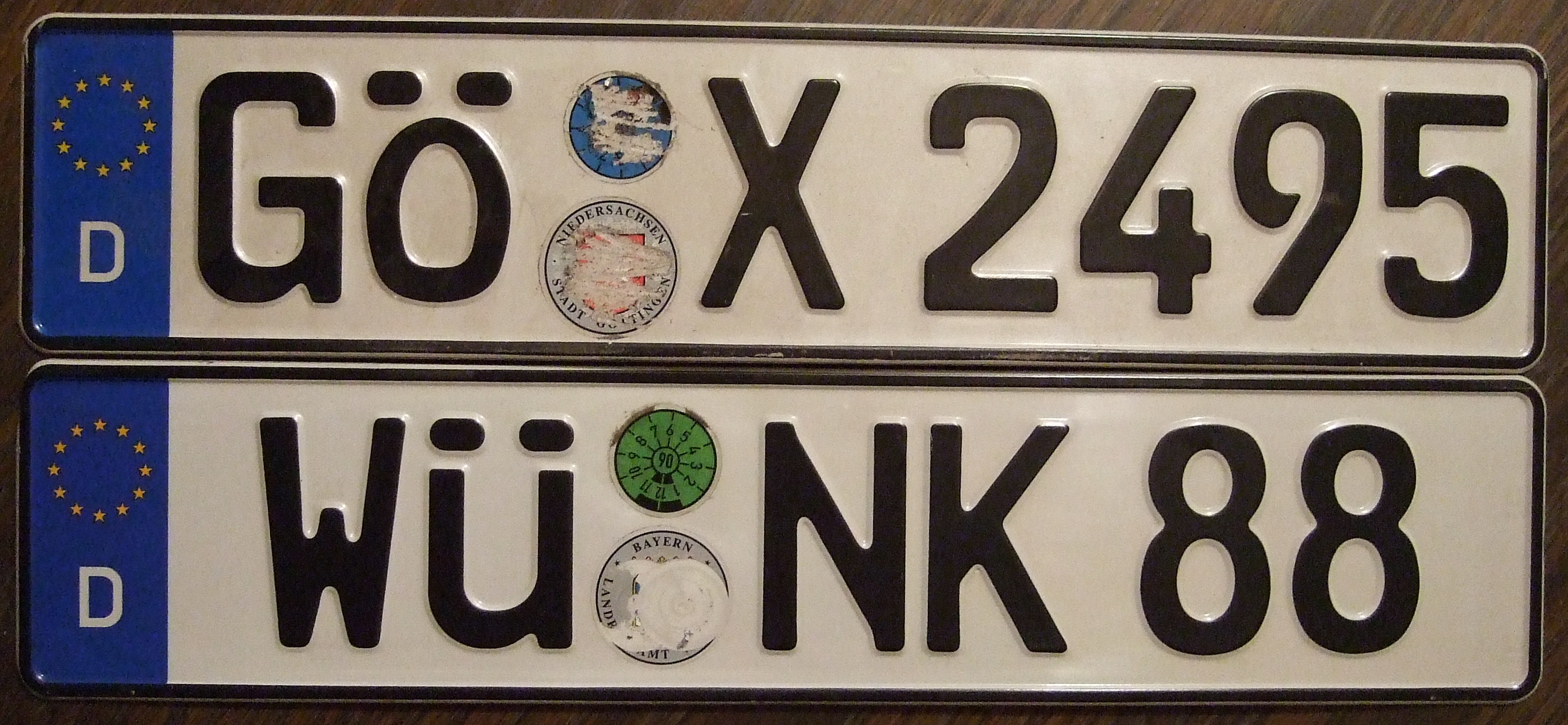
Two plates with umlauts, from Göttingen and Würzburg

==== Development of the area code ====
When the area codes were introduced, they were intended mainly as a means for police officers to identify speeders and other traffic offenders. However, they soon developed into everyday abbreviations of people's home areas and were cherished or despised. Sometimes, the codes of neighbouring districts were given mocking or spiteful meanings. (Note: Drivers from Offenbach are slandered to be ohne Verstand (without sense) and even misspell it OF.) When districts merged and only one of their codes could be continued, fierce disputes might ensue about which one.

==== The Büsingen exclave ====
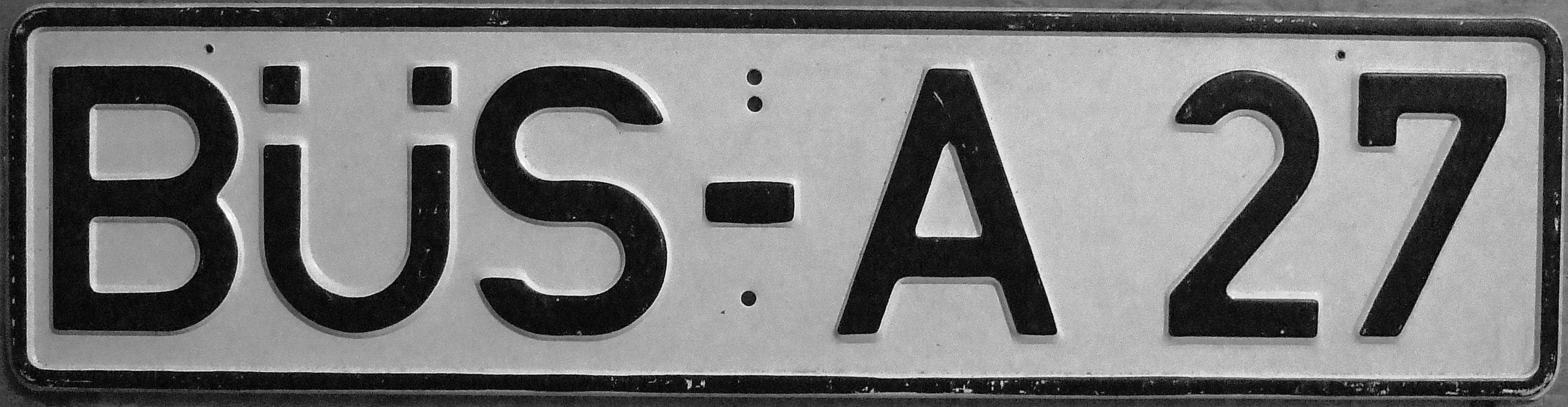
Licence plate from the municipality of Büsingen, 1970s

Since 1968, a peculiar rule has applied to the municipality of Büsingen am Hochrhein which is a German exclave completely surrounded by Swiss territory. Although Büsingen belongs to the German district of Konstanz, it is part of the Swiss customs area. For this reason, a vehicle registered to a citizen of Büsingen does not bear KN for Konstanz but BÜS, signifying to Swiss customs officers that this is in fact a domestic vehicle. There are about 700 cars with this area code, which makes Büsingen the smallest and least-populated registration precinct in Germany.

==== List of area codes ====
List of license plate area codes of Germany

Codes starting with letter A
| Code | City / rural district | State | Namesake | Notes |
|---|---|---|---|---|
| A | Augsburg City | Bavaria | Augsburg | From [A-AA 100 to 999] To [A-ZZ 100 to 999] (Excludes [A-PS 100 to 999], reserved for city Police); From [A-AA 5000 to 9999] to [A-ZZ 5000 to 9999] [A-X 1 to 999] Where X is: B, F, G [A-XY 1 to 99] Where either X or Y or both are: B, F, G |
| A | Augsburg District | Bavaria | Augsburg | From [A-A 1000 to 9999] To [A-Z 1000 to 9999] From [A-AA 1000 to 4999] to [A-ZZ 1000 to 4999] [A-X 1 to 999] Where X isn't: B, F, G [A-XY 1 to 99] Where neither X nor Y are: B, F, G' |
| AA | Ostalb District | Baden-Württemberg | Aalen | |
| AB | Aschaffenburg District | Bavaria | Aschaffenburg | From [AB-AA 100 to 9999] to [AB-ZZ 100 to 9999] [AB-X 1 to 999] Where X is: B, F, G, I, O, Q [AB-'XY 1 to 99] Where either X or Y or both are: B, F, G, I, O, Q |
| AB | Aschaffenburg City | Bavaria | Aschaffenburg | From [AB-A 1000 to 9999] to [ AB-Z 1000 to 9999] [AB-X 1 to 999] Where X is not: B, F, G, I, O, Q [AB-'XY 1 to 99] Where neither X nor Y are: B, F, G, I, O, Q |
| ABG | Altenburger Land District | Thuringia | Altenburg | |
| ABI | Anhalt-Bitterfeld District | Saxony-Anhalt | Anhalt-Bitterfeld | |
| AC | Aachen Region | North Rhine-Westphalia | Aachen | |
| AE | Vogtland District | Saxony | Auerbach | |
| AH | Borken District | North Rhine-Westphalia | Ahaus | |
| AIB | Munich District | Bavaria | Bad Aibling | From [AIB-Q 1] to [AIB-Q 9999] |
| AIB | Rosenheim District | Bavaria | Bad Aibling | Every other available combination |
| AIC | Aichach-Friedberg District | Bavaria | Aichach | |
| AK | Altenkirchen (Westerwald) District | Rhineland-Palatinate | Altenkirchen | |
| ALF | Hildesheim District | Lower Saxony | Alfeld | |
| ALZ | Aschaffenburg District | Bavaria | Alzenau | |
| AM | Amberg City | Bavaria | Amberg | From [AM-A 1 to 999] to [AM-Z 1 to 999] From [AM-AA 1 to 99] to [AM-ZZ 1 to 99] |
| AN | Ansbach District | Bavaria | Ansbach | From [AN-AA 100 to 999] to [AN-ZZ 100 to 999] [AN-X 1 to 999] Where X is: B, F, G, I, O, Q [AN-'XY 1 to 99] Where either X or Y or both are: B, F, G, I, O, Q |
| AN | Ansbach City | Bavaria | Ansbach | [AN-X 1 to 999] Where X is not: B, F, G, I, O, Q [AN-XY 1 to 99] Where neither X nor Y are: B, F, G, I, O, Q |
| ANA | Erzgebirge District | Saxony | Annaberg-Buchholz | |
| ANG | Uckermark District | Brandenburg | Angermünde | |
| ANK | Vorpommern-Greifswald District (Excluding Greifswald City) | Mecklenburg-Vorpommern | Anklam | |
| AÖ | Altötting District | Bavaria | Altötting | |
| AP | Weimarer Land District | Thuringia | Apolda | |
| APD | Weimarer Land District | Thuringia | Apolda | |
| ARN | Ilm District | Thuringia | Arnstadt | |
| ART | Kyffhäuser District | Thuringia | Artern | |
| AS | Amberg-Sulzbach District | Bavaria | Amberg-Sulzbach | |
| ASL | Salzland District | Saxony-Anhalt | Ascherleben | |
| ASZ | Erzgebirge District | Saxony | Aue-Schwarzenberg | |
| AT | Mecklenburgische Seenplatte District (Excluding Neubrandenburg City) | Mecklenburg-Vorpommern | Altentreptow | |
| AU | Erzgebirge District | Saxony | Aue-Bad Schlema | |
| AUR | Aurich District | Lower Saxony | Aurich | |
| AW | Ahrweiler District | Rhineland-Palatinate | Bad Neuenahr-Ahrweiler | |
| AZ | Alzey-Worms District | Rhineland-Palatinate | Alzey | |
| AZE | Anhalt-Bitterfeld District | Saxony-Anhalt | Anhalt-Zerbst | |

Codes starting with letter B
| Code | City / rural district | State | Namesake | Notes |
|---|---|---|---|---|
| B | Berlin | | Berlin | |
| BA | Bamberg City | Bavaria | Bamberg | From [BA-AA 100 to 9999] to [BA-ZZ 100 to 9999] [BA-X 1 to 9999] Where X is :B, F, G, I, O, Q (Excludes [BA-P 1000 to 9999], reserved for City Police) [BA-XY 1 to 999] Where either X or Y or both are: B, F, G, I, O, Q |
| BA | Bamberg District | Bavaria | Bamberg | [BA-X 1 to 9999] Where X is not:B, F, G, I, O, Q (Excludes [BA-P 1000 to 9999], reserved for District Police) [BA-XY 1 to 99] Where neither X nor Y are: B, F, G, I, O, Q |
| BAD | Baden-Baden City | Baden-Württemberg | Baden-Baden | |
| BAR | Barnim District | Brandenburg | Barnim | |
| BB | Böblingen District | Baden-Württemberg | Böblingen | |
| BBG | Salzland District | Saxony-Anhalt | Bernburg | |
| BBL | Brandenburg Government, Landtag, and Police | Brandenburg | Brandenburgische; Landesregierung | Code reserved for Brandenburg State-owned governmental vehicles |
| BC | Biberach District | Baden-Württemberg | Biberach | |
| BCH | Neckar-Odenwald District | Baden-Württemberg | Buchen | |
| BD | German Bundestag, Bundesrat, Office of the Federal President, Federal Government and Ministries, Federal fiscal administration (incl. Federal Customs Service), and Federal Constitutional Court | | Bundesdienst (Federal service) | Code reserved for federally owned governmental vehicles |
| BE | Warendorf District | North Rhine-Westphalia | Beckum | |
| BED | Mittelsachsen District | Saxony | Brand-Erbisdorf | |
| BER | Barnim District | Brandenburg | Bernau | |
| BF | Steinfurt District | North Rhine-Westphalia | Burgsteinfurt | |
| BGD | Berchtesgadener Land District | Bavaria | Berchtesgaden | |
| BGL | Berchtesgadener Land District | Bavaria | Berchtesgadener Land | |
| BH | Ortenau District | Baden-Württemberg | Bühl | [BH-OF 1 to 999] and [BH-OP 1 to 999] From [BH-F 7000] to [BH-F 7999] From [BH-N 8000] to [BH-N 8999] From [BH-O 2000] to [BH-O 2999] From [BH-OF 1000] to [BH-OF 6999] From [BH-OG 9000] to [BH-OG 9999] From [BH-OK 3000] to [BH-OK 3999] From [BH-OP 1000] to [BH-OP 4999] |
| BH | Rastatt District | Baden-Württemberg | Bühl | Every other available combination |
| BI | Bielefeld City | North Rhine-Westphalia | Bielefeld | |
| BID | Marburg-Biedenkopf District | Hesse | Biedenkopf | |
| BIN | Mainz-Bingen District | Rhineland-Palatinate | Bingen | |
| BIR | Birkenfeld District | Rhineland-Palatinate | Birkenfeld | |
| BIT | Eifel District Bitburg-Prüm | Rhineland-Palatinate | Bitburg | |
| BIW | Bautzen District | Saxony | Bischofswerda | |
| BK | Rems-Murr District | Baden-Württemberg | Backnang | From [BK-A 100 to 999] to [BK-M 100 to 999] (Excluding Codes B, F, G, I); From [BK-N 1] to [BK-Z 999] (Excluding codes O and Q); From [BK-AA 1 to 99] to [BK-PZ 1 to 99] (Excluding Codes B, F, G, I, O, Q); From [BK-A 1000 to 9999] to [BK-Z 1000 to 9999] |
| BK | Schwäbisch Hall District | Baden-Württemberg | Backnang | [BK-A 1 to 99] to [BK-M 1 to 99] (Excluding Codes B, F, G, I); From [BK-RA 1 to 99] to [BK-ZZ 1 to 99] (Excluding Codes B, F, G, I, O, Q); From [BK-TA 1000 to 999] to [BK-ZZ 1000 to 999] |
| BK | Börde District | Saxony-Anhalt | Bördekreis | [BK-X 1 to 999] Where X is: B, F, G, I, O, Q [BK-XY 1 to 99] Where either X or Y or both are : B, F, G, I, O, Q From [BK-A 1000 to 9999] to [BK-Z 1000 to 9999] From [BK-AA 100 to 999] to [BK-ZZ 100 to 999] From [BK-AA 1000 to 9999] to [BK-SZ 1000 to 9999] |
| BKS | Bernkastel-Wittlich District | Rhineland-Palatinate | Bernkastel-Kues | |
| BL | Zollernalb District | Baden-Württemberg | Balingen | |
| BLB | Siegen-Wittgenstein District | North Rhine-Westphalia | Bad Berleburg | |
| BLK | Burgenland District | Saxony-Anhalt | Burgenlandkreis | |
| BM | Rhein-Erft District | North Rhine-Westphalia | Bergheim | |
| BN | Bonn City | North Rhine-Westphalia | Bonn | |
| BNA | Leipzig District | Saxony | Borna | |
| BO | Bochum City | North Rhine-Westphalia | Bochum | |
| BÖ | Börde District | Saxony-Anhalt | Börde | |
| BOG | Straubing-Bogen District | Bavaria | Bogen | |
| BOH | Borken District | North Rhine-Westphalia | Bocholt | |
| BOR | Borken District | North Rhine-Westphalia | Borken | |
| BOT | Bottrop City | North Rhine-Westphalia | Bottrop | |
| BP | German Federal Police | | Bundespolizei | Code reserved for Vehicles of German Federal Police |
| BRA | Wesermarsch District | Lower Saxony | Brake | |
| BRB | Brandenburg an der Havel City | Brandenburg | Brandenburg | |
| BRG | Jerichower Land District | Saxony-Anhalt | Burg | |
| BRK | Bad Kissingen District | Bavaria | Bad Brückenau | |
| BRL | Goslar District | Lower Saxony | Braunlage | |
| BRV | Rotenburg (Wümme) District | Lower Saxony | Bremervörde | |
| BS | Braunschweig City (Brunswick) | Lower Saxony | Braunschweig | |
| BSB | Osnabrück District | Lower Saxony | Bersenbrück | |
| BSK | Oder-Spree District | Brandenburg | Beeskow | |
| BT | Bayreuth District | Bavaria | Bayreuth | From [BT-AA 100 to 9999] to [BT-ZZ 100 to 9999] [BT-X 1 to 999] Where X is: B, F, G [BT-XY 1 to 99] Where X or Y or both are: B, F, G |
| BT | Bayreuth City | Bavaria | Bayreuth | [BT-X 1 to 999] Where X is not : B, F, G, I, O, Q [BT-XY 1 to 99] Where neither X nor Y are: B, F, G, I, O, Q [BT-X 1000 to 9999] Where X is not: B, F, G |
| BTF | Anhalt-Bitterfeld District | Saxony-Anhalt | Bitterfeld-Wolfen | |
| BÜD | Wetterau District | Hesse | Büdingen | |
| BUL | Amberg-Sulzbach District | Bavaria | Burglengenfeld | [BUL-X 1 to 999] Where X is: B, F, G |
| BUL | Schwandorf District | Bavaria | Burglengenfeld | Every other available combination |
| BÜR | Paderborn District | North Rhine-Westphalia | Büren | |
| BÜS | Büsingen am Hochrhein Municipality (A subdivision of Konstanz District) | Baden-Württemberg | Büsingen | It is allocated its own code to facilitate cross-border travel, as it is a German exclave within Switzerland |
| BÜZ | Rostock District | Mecklenburg-Vorpommern | Bützow | |
| BW | Federal Waterways and Shipping Administration | | Bundes-Wasserstraßen- und Schifffahrtsverwaltung | Code reserved for Vehicles of German Federal Waterway and Shipping Admin. |
| BWL | Baden-Württemberg Government, Landtag, and Police | Baden-Württemberg | Baden-Württembergischer; Landtag | Code reserved for Baden-Württemberg State-owned governmental vehicles |
| BYL | Bavaria Government and Landtag | Bavaria | Bayerischer; Landtag | Code reserved for Bavaria State-owned governmental vehicles |
| BZ | Bautzen District | Saxony | Bautzen | |

Codes starting with letter C
| Code | City / rural district | State | Namesake | Notes |
|---|---|---|---|---|
| C | Chemnitz City | Saxony | Chemnitz | From [C-AA 1 to 9999] to [C-ZZ 1 to 9999] |
| CA | Oberspreewald-Lausitz District | Brandenburg | Calau | |
| CAS | Recklinghausen District | North Rhine-Westphalia | Castrop-Rauxel | |
| CB | Cottbus City | Brandenburg | Cottbus | From [CB-AA 1 to 999] to [CB-ZZ 1 to 999] |
| CE | Celle District | Lower Saxony | Celle | |
| CHA | Cham District | Bavaria | Cham | |
| CLP | Cloppenburg District | Lower Saxony | Cloppenburg | |
| CLZ | Goslar District | Lower Saxony | Clausthal-Zellerfeld | |
| CO | Coburg City; Coburg District | Bavaria | Coburg | |
| COC | Cochem-Zell District | Rhineland-Palatinate | Cochem | |
| COE | Coesfeld District | North Rhine-Westphalia | Coesfeld | |
| CR | Schwäbisch Hall District | Baden-Württemberg | Crailsheim | |
| CUX | Cuxhaven District | Lower Saxony | Cuxhaven | |
| CW | Calw District | Baden-Württemberg | Calw | |

Codes starting with letter D
| Code | City / rural district | State | Namesake | Notes |
|---|---|---|---|---|
| D | Düsseldorf City | North Rhine-Westphalia | Düsseldorf | |
| DA | Darmstadt City | Hesse | Darmstadt | From [DA-AA 100 to 999] to [DA-ZZ 100 to 999] [DA-XY 1 to 99] Where either X or Y or both are: B, F, G, I, O, Q [DA-X 1 to 99] Where X is: B, F, G, I, O, Q |
| DA | Darmstadt-Dieburg District | Hesse | Darmstadt | From [DA-A 1000 to 9000] to [DA-Z 1000 to 9999] From [DA-AA 1000 to 9999] to [DA-ZZ 1000 to 9999] [DA-XY 1 to 99] Where neither X nor Y are: B, F, G, I, O, Q [DA-X 1 to 99] Where X is not: B, F, G, I, O, Q |
| DAH | Dachau District | Bavaria | Dachau | |
| DAN | Lüchow-Dannenberg District | Lower Saxony | Dannenberg | |
| DAU | Vulkaneifel District | Rhineland-Palatinate | Daun | |
| DBR | Rostock District | Mecklenburg-Vorpommern | Bad Doberan | |
| DD | Saxony Police | Saxony | Dresden | From [DD-Q 1] to [DD-Q 9999] |
| DD | Dresden City | Saxony | Dresden | From [DD-AA 1 to 9999] to [DD-ZZ 1 to 9999] |
| DE | Dessau-Roßlau City | Saxony-Anhalt | Dessau-Roßlau | |
| DEG | Deggendorf District | Bavaria | Deggendorf | |
| DEL | Delmenhorst City | Lower Saxony | Delmenhorst | |
| DGF | Dingolfing-Landau District | Bavaria | Dingolfing | |
| DH | Diepholz District | Lower Saxony | Diepholz | |
| DI | Darmstadt-Dieburg District | Hesse | Dieburg | |
| DIL | Lahn-Dill District (Excluding Wetzlar City) | Hesse | Dillenburg | |
| DIN | Wesel District | North Rhine-Westphalia | Dinslaken | |
| DIZ | Rhein-Lahn District | Rhineland-Palatinate | Diez | |
| DKB | Ansbach District | Bavaria | Dinkelsbühl | |
| DL | Mittelsachsen District | Saxony | Döbeln | |
| DLG | Dillingen an der Donau District | Bavaria | Dillingen | |
| DM | Mecklenburgische Seenplatte District (Excluding Neubrandenburg City) | Mecklenburg-Vorpommern | Demmin | |
| DN | Düren District | North Rhine-Westphalia | Düren | |
| DO | Dortmund City | North Rhine-Westphalia | Dortmund | |
| DON | Donau-Ries District | Bavaria | Donauwörth | |
| DU | Duisburg City | North Rhine-Westphalia | Duisburg | |
| DUD | Göttingen District (Excluding Göttingen City) | Lower Saxony | Duderstadt | |
| DÜW | Bad Dürkheim District | Rhineland-Palatinate | Bad Dürkheim an der Weinstraße | |
| DW | Sächsische Schweiz-Osterzgebirge District | Saxony | Dippoldiswalde | |
| DZ | Nordsachsen District | Saxony | Delitzsch | |

Codes starting with letter E
| Code | City / rural district | State | Namesake | Notes |
|---|---|---|---|---|
| E | Essen City | North Rhine-Westphalia | Essen | |
| EA | Wartburg District | Thuringia | Eisenach | Eisenach was an independent urban District until 1 July 2021, when it was merged into Wartburg District due to a budgetary crisis. |
| EB | Nordsachsen District | Saxony | Eilenburg | |
| EBE | Ebersberg District | Bavaria | Ebersberg | |
| EBN | Haßberge District | Bavaria | Ebern | |
| EBS | Kulmbach District | Bavaria | Ebermannstadt | From [EBS-A 1 to 999] to [EBS-M 1 to 999] |
| EBS | Bayreuth District | Bavaria | Ebermannstadt | From [EBS-N 1 to 999] to [EBS-Z 1 to 999] |
| EBS | Forchheim District | Bavaria | Ebermannstadt | Every other available combination |
| ECK | Rendsburg-Eckernförde District | Schleswig-Holstein | Eckernförde | |
| ED | Erding District | Bavaria | Erding | |
| EE | Elbe-Elster District | Brandenburg | Elbe-Elster | |
| EF | Thuringia Police | Thuringia | Erfurt | From [EF-LP 1000] to [EF-LP 9999] |
| EF | Erfurt City | Thuringia | Erfurt | From [EF-AA 1 to 999] to [EF-ZZ 1 to 999] |
| EG | Rottal-Inn District | Bavaria | Eggenfelden | |
| EH | Oder-Spree District | Brandenburg | Eisenhüttenstadt | |
| EI | Eichstätt District | Bavaria | Eichstätt | |
| EIC | Eichsfeld District | Thuringia | Eichsfeld | |
| EIL | Mansfeld-Südharz District | Saxony-Anhalt | Eisleben | |
| EIN | Northeim District | Lower Saxony | Einbeck | |
| EIS | Saale-Holzland District | Thuringia | Eisenberg | |
| EL | Emsland District | Lower Saxony | Emsland | |
| EM | Emmendingen District | Baden-Württemberg | Emmendingen | |
| EMD | Emden City | Lower Saxony | Emden | |
| EMS | Rhein-Lahn District | Rhineland-Palatinate | Bad Ems | |
| EN | Ennepe-Ruhr District | North Rhine-Westphalia | Ennepe | |
| ER | Erlangen City | Bavaria | Erlangen | |
| ERB | Odenwald District | Hesse | Erbach | |
| ERH | Erlangen-Höchstadt District | Bavaria | Erlangen-Höchstadt | |
| ERK | Heinsberg District | North Rhine-Westphalia | Erkelenz | |
| ERZ | Erzgebirge District | Saxony | Erzgebirge | |
| ES | Esslingen District | Baden-Württemberg | Esslingen | |
| ESB | Bayreuth District | Bavaria | Eschenbach | From [ESB-AT 1 to 99] to [ESB-ZT 1 to 99] |
| ESB | Amberg-Sulzbach District | Bavaria | Eschenbach | From [ESB-'B 1] to [ESB-X 999] 'Where X is: B, F, G, I, O, Q |
| ESB | Nürnberger Land District | Bavaria | Eschenbach | From [ESB-N 1] to [ESB-N 999] |
| ESB | Neustadt an der Waldnaab District | Bavaria | Eschenbach | Every other available combination |
| ESW | Werra-Meißner District | Hesse | Eschwege | |
| EU | Euskirchen District | North Rhine-Westphalia | Euskirchen | |
| EW | Barnim District | Brandenburg | Eberswalde | |

Codes starting with letter F
| Code | City / rural district | State | Namesake | Notes |
|---|---|---|---|---|
| F | Frankfurt am Main City | Hesse | Frankfurt | |
| FB | Wetterau District | Hesse | Friedberg | |
| FD | Fulda District | Hesse | Fulda | |
| FDB | Aichach-Friedberg District | Bavaria | Friedberg | |
| FDS | Freudenstadt District | Baden-Württemberg | Freudenstadt | |
| FEU | Ansbach District | Bavaria | Feuchtwangen | |
| FF | Frankfurt (Oder) City | Brandenburg | Frankfurt | |
| FFB | Fürstenfeldbruck District | Bavaria | Fürstenfeldbruck | |
| FG | Mittelsachsen District | Saxony | Freiberg | |
| FI | Elbe-Elster District | Brandenburg | Finsterwalde | |
| FKB | Waldeck-Frankenberg District | Hesse | Frankenberg | |
| FL | Flensburg City | Schleswig-Holstein | Flensburg | |
| FLÖ | Mittelsachsen District | Saxony | Flöha | |
| FN | Bodensee (Lake Constance) District | Baden-Württemberg | Friedrichshafen | |
| FO | Forchheim District | Bavaria | Forchheim | |
| FOR | Spree-Neiße District | Brandenburg | Forst | |
| FR | Freiburg im Breisgau City | Baden-Württemberg | FReiburg | [FR-X 1 to 999] Where X is: B, F, G, I, O, Q [FR-XY 1 to 99] Where either X or Y or both are: B, F, G, I, O, Q From [FR-NA 1000 to 9999] to [FR-ZZ 1000 to 9999] |
| FR | Breisgau-Hochschwarzwald District | Baden-Württemberg | FReiburg | [FR-X 1 to 999] Where X is not: B, F, G, I, O, Q [FR-XY 1 to 99] Where neither X nor Y are: B, F, G, I, O, Q From [FR-AA 1000 to 9999] to [FR-MZ 1000 to 9999] |
| FRG | Freyung-Grafenau District | Bavaria | Freyung-Grafenau | |
| FRI | Friesland District | Lower Saxony | Friesland | |
| FRW | Märkisch-Oderland District | Brandenburg | Bad Freienwalde | |
| FS | Moosburg an der Isar City (A subdivision of Freising District) | Bavaria | Freising | [FS-I 1 to 999] [FS-X 1000 to 999] Where X is: H, I, M, P, R [FS-XY 1 to 99] Where either X or Y or both are: I |
| FS | Freising District (Excluding Moosburg an der Isar City) | Bavaria | Freising | [FS-X 1 to 999] Where X is not: I, O, Q [FS-XY 1 to 999] Where neither X nor Y are: I, O, Q |
| FT | Frankenthal (Pfalz) City | Rhineland-Palatinate | Frankenthal | |
| FTL | Sächsische Schweiz-Osterzgebirge District | Saxony | Freital | |
| FÜ | Fürth City | Bavaria | Fürth | [FÜ-X 1 to 999] Where X is: B, F, G, I, O, Q [FÜ-XY 1 to 99] Where either X or Y or both are: B, F, G, I, O, Q From [FÜ-AA 100 to 9999] to [FÜ-ZZ 100 to 9999] |
| FÜ | Fürth District | Bavaria | Fürth | [FÜ-X 1 to 999] Where X is not: B, F, G, I, O, Q [FÜ-XY 1 to 99] Where neither X nor Y are: B, F, G, I, O, Q From [FÜ-A 1000 to 9999] to [FÜ-Z 1000 to 9999] |
| FÜS | Ostallgäu District | Bavaria | Füssen | |
| FW | Oder-Spree District | Brandenburg | Fürstenwalde | |
| FZ | Schwalm-Eder District | Hesse | Fritzlar | |

Codes starting with letter G
| Code | City / rural district | State | Namesake | Notes |
|---|---|---|---|---|
| G | Gera City | Thuringia | Gera | |
| GA | Altmark District Salzwedel | Saxony-Anhalt | Gardelegen | |
| GAN | Northeim District | Lower Saxony | Bad Gandersheim | |
| GAP | Garmisch-Partenkirchen District | Bavaria | Garmisch-Partenkirchen | |
| GC | Zwickau District | Saxony | Glauchau | |
| GD | Ostalb District | Baden-Württemberg | Schwäbisch Gmünd | |
| GDB | Nordwestmecklenburg District (Excluding Wismar City) | Mecklenburg-Vorpommern | Gadebusch | |
| GE | Gelsenkirchen City | North Rhine-Westphalia | Gelsenkirchen | |
| GEL | Kleve District | North Rhine-Westphalia | Geldern | |
| GEO | Haßberge District | Bavaria | Gerolzhofen | [GEO-A 1000 to 9990] [GEO-B 1000 to 9990] |
| GEO | Schweinfurt District | Bavaria | Gerolzhofen | Every other available combination |
| GER | Germersheim District | Rhineland-Palatinate | Germersheim | |
| GF | Gifhorn District | Lower Saxony | Gifhorn | |
| GG | Groß-Gerau District | Hesse | Groß-Gerau | |
| GHA | Leipzig District | Saxony | Geithain | |
| GHC | Wittenberg District | Saxony-Anhalt | Gräfenhainichen | |
| GI | Gießen District | Hesse | Gießen | |
| GK | Heinsberg District | North Rhine-Westphalia | Geilenkirchen | |
| GL | Rheinisch-Bergischer District | North Rhine-Westphalia | Bergisch Gladbach | |
| GLA | Recklinghausen District | North Rhine-Westphalia | Gladbeck | |
| GM | Oberbergischer District | North Rhine-Westphalia | Gummersbach | |
| GMN | Vorpommern-Rügen District (Excluding Stralsund City) | Mecklenburg-Vorpommern | Grimmen | |
| GN | Main-Kinzig District (Excluding Hanau City) | Hesse | Gelnhausen | |
| GNT | Jerichower Land District | Saxony-Anhalt | Genthin | |
| GÖ | Göttingen District (Excluding Göttingen City) | Lower Saxony | Göttingen | [GÖ-X 1 to 999] Where X is: B, F, G, O, Q [GÖ-XY 1 to 99] Where either X or Y or both are: B, F, G, O, Q From [GÖ-AA 100 to 999] to [GÖ-ZZ 100 to 999] |
| GÖ | Göttingen City (A subdivision of Göttingen District) | Lower Saxony | Göttingen | [GÖ-X 1 to 999] Where X isn't: B, F, G, I, O, Q [GÖ-XY 1 to 99] Where neither X nor Y are: B, F, G, I, O, Q From [GÖ-A 1000 to 9999] to [GÖ-Z 1000 to 9999] |
| GOA | Rhein-Hunsrück District | Rhineland-Palatinate | Sankt Goar | |
| GOH | Rhein-Lahn District | Rhineland-Palatinate | Sankt Goarshausen | |
| GP | Göppingen District | Baden-Württemberg | Göppingen | |
| GR | Görlitz District | Saxony | Görlitz | |
| GRA | Freyung-Grafenau District | Bavaria | Grafenau | |
| GRH | Meißen District | Saxony | Großenhain | |
| GRI | Rottal-Inn District | Bavaria | Bad Griesbach | [GRI-XY 100 to 999] Where either X or Y or both are: B, I, O, Q |
| GRM | Leipzig District | Saxony | Grimma | |
| GRZ | Greiz District | Thuringia | Greiz | |
| GS | Goslar District | Lower Saxony | Goslar | |
| GT | Gütersloh District | North Rhine-Westphalia | Gütersloh | |
| GTH | Gotha District | Thuringia | Gotha | |
| GÜ | Rostock District | Mecklenburg-Vorpommern | Güstrow | |
| GUB | Spree-Neiße District | Brandenburg | Guben | |
| GUN | Weißenburg-Gunzenhausen District | Bavaria | Gunzenhausen | |
| GV | Rhein District Neuss | North Rhine-Westphalia | Grevenbroich | |
| GVM | Nordwestmecklenburg District (Excluding Wismar City) | Mecklenburg-Vorpommern | Grevesmühlen | |
| GW | Vorpommern-Greifswald District (Excluding Greifswald City) | Mecklenburg-Vorpommern | Greifswald | |
| GZ | Günzburg District | Bavaria | Günzburg | |

Codes starting with letter H
| Code | City / rural district | State | Namesake | Notes |
|---|---|---|---|---|
| H | Hanover City (A subdivision of Hanover Region) | Lower Saxony | Hannover | [H-X 1 to 9999] Where X is: B, F, G, I, O, Q [H-XY 1 to 99] Where either X or Y or both are: B, F, G, I, O, Q From [H-A 1000 to 9999] to [H-Z 1000 to 9999] From [H-BA 1000 to 9999] to [H-BZ 1000 to 9999] From [H-FA 1000 to 9999] to [H-GZ 1000 to 9999] |
| H | Hanover Region (Excluding Hanover City) | Lower Saxony | Hannover | [H-X 1 to 9999] Where X is not: B, F, G, I, O, Q [H-XY 1 to 99] Where neither X nor Y are: B, F, G, I, O, Q From [H-AA 1000 to 9999] to [H-AZ 1000 to 9999] From [H-CA 1000 to 9999] to [H-EZ 1000 to 9999] From [H-HA 1000 to 9999] to [H-ZZ 1000 to 9999] |
| HA | Hagen City | North Rhine-Westphalia | Hagen | |
| HAB | Bad Kissingen District | Bavaria | Hammelburg | |
| HAL | Halle (Saale) City | Saxony-Anhalt | Halle | |
| HAM | Hamm City | North Rhine-Westphalia | Hamm | |
| HAS | Haßberge District | Bavaria | Hassfurt | |
| HB | Bremen City | State of Bremen | Hansestadt Bremen | From [HB-A 1 to 999] to [HB-Z 1 to 999] From [HB-AA 1 to 999] to [HB-ZZ 1 to 999] |
| HB | Bremerhaven City | State of Bremen | Hansestadt Bremen | From [HB-A 1000 to 9999] to [HB-Z 1000 to 9999] |
| HBN | Hildburghausen District | Thuringia | Hildburghausen | |
| HBS | Harz District | Saxony-Anhalt | Halberstadt | |
| HC | Mittelsachsen District | Saxony | Hainichen | |
| HCH | Freudenstadt District | Baden-Württemberg | Hechingen | [HCH-QY 1000 to 999], [HCH-VY 1000 to 999] [HCH-YQ 1000 to 999], [HCH-YV 1000 to 999] [HCH-ZQ 1000 to 999] |
| HCH | Zollernalb District | Baden-Württemberg | Hechingen | Every other available combination |
| HD | Rhein-Neckar District | Baden-Württemberg | Heidelberg | [HD-X 1 to 999] Where X is: B, F, G, I, O, Q [HD-XY 1 to 99] Where either X or Y or both are: B, F, G, I, O, Q From [HD-AA 100 to 9999] to [HD-ZZ 100 to 9999] |
| HD | Heidelberg City | Baden-Württemberg | Heidelberg | [HD-X 1 to 999] Where X isn't: B, F, G, I, O, Q [HD-XY 1 to 99] Where neither X nor Y are: B, F, G, I, O, Q From [HD-A 1000 to 9999] to [HD-Z 1000 to 9999] |
| HDH | Heidenheim District | Baden-Württemberg | Heidenheim | |
| HDL | Börde District | Saxony-Anhalt | Haldensleben | |
| HE | Helmstedt District | Lower Saxony | Helmstedt | |
| HEB | Nürnberger Land District | Bavaria | Hersbruck | |
| HEF | Hersfeld-Rotenburg District | Hesse | Bad Hersfeld | |
| HEI | Dithmarschen District | Schleswig-Holstein | Heide | |
| HEL | Hesse Government and Landtag | Hesse | Hessischer Landtag | Code reserved for Hesse State-owned governmental vehicles |
| HER | Herne City | North Rhine-Westphalia | Herne | |
| HET | Mansfeld-Südharz District | Saxony-Anhalt | Hettstedt | |
| HF | Herford District | North Rhine-Westphalia | Herford | |
| HG | Hochtaunus District | Hesse | Bad Homburg | |
| HGN | Ludwigslust-Parchim District | Mecklenburg-Vorpommern | Hagenow | |
| HGW | Greifswald City (A subdivision of Vorpommern-Greifswald District) | Mecklenburg-Vorpommern | Hansestadt Greifswald | |
| HH | Hamburg | | Hansestadt Hamburg | |
| HHM | Burgenland District | Saxony-Anhalt | Hohenmölsen | |
| HI | Hildesheim District | Lower Saxony | Hildesheim | |
| HIG | Eichsfeld District | Thuringia | Heilbad Heiligenstadt | |
| HIP | Roth District | Bavaria | Hilpoltstein | |
| HK | Heide District | Lower Saxony | Heidekreis | |
| HL | Lübeck City | Schleswig-Holstein | Hansestadt Lübeck | |
| HM | Hameln-Pyrmont District | Lower Saxony | Hameln (Hamelin) | |
| HMÜ | Göttingen District (Excluding Göttingen City) | Lower Saxony | Hann. Münden | |
| HN | Heilbronn District | Baden-Württemberg | Heilbronn | From [HN-AA 100 to 999] to [HN-ZZ 100 to 999] From [HN-AA 1000 to 9999] to [HN-MZ 1000 to 9999] [HN-X 1 to 999] Where X is: B, F, G, I, O, Q [HN-XY 1 to 99] Where either X or Y or both are: B, F, G, I, O, Q |
| HN | Heilbronn City | Baden-Württemberg | Heilbronn | From [HN-A 1000 to 9999] to [HN-Z 1000 to 9999] From [HN-NA 1000 to 9999] to [HN-ZZ 1000 to 9999] [HN-X 1 to 999] Where X isn't: B, F, G, I, O, Q [HN-XY 1 to 99] Where neither X nor Y are: B, F, G, I, O, Q |
| HO | Hof District | Bavaria | Hof | From [HO-AA 100 to 999] to [HO-ZZ 100 to 999] From [HO-AA 1000 to 9999] to [HO-ZZ 1000 to 9999] (Shared) [HO-B 1 to 999] [HO-G 1 to 999] [HO-F 1 to 99] |
| HO | Hof City | Bavaria | Hof | From [HO-AA 1000 to 9999] to [HO-ZZ 1000 to 9999] (Shared) [HO-F 100 to 999] [HN-X 1 to 999] Where X isn't: B, F, G, I, O, Q [HO-XY 1 to 99] Where neither X nor Y are: B, F, G, I, O, Q |
| HOG | Kassel District | Hesse | Hofgeismar | |
| HOH | Haßberge District | Bavaria | Hofheim | |
| HOL | Holzminden District | Lower Saxony | Holzminden | |
| HOM | Saarpfalz District (Excluding Sankt Ingbert City) | Saarland | Homburg | |
| HOR | Freudenstadt District | Baden-Württemberg | Horb | |
| HÖS | Erlangen-Höchstadt District | Bavaria | Höchstadt | |
| HOT | Zwickau District | Saxony | Hohenstein-Ernstthal | |
| HP | Bergstraße District | Hesse | Heppenheim | |
| HR | Schwalm-Eder District | Hesse | Homberg | |
| HRO | Rostock City | Mecklenburg-Vorpommern | Hansestadt Rostock | |
| HS | Heinsberg District | North Rhine-Westphalia | Heinsberg | |
| HSK | Hochsauerland District | North Rhine-Westphalia | HochSauerlandKreis | |
| HST | Stralsund City (A subdivision of Vorpommern-Rügen District) | Mecklenburg-Vorpommern | Hansestadt Stralsund | From [HST-AA 1 to 999] to [HST-ZZ 1 to 999] [HST-X 1 to 999] Where X is: B, G, I, O, Q |
| HU | Main-Kinzig District | Hesse | Hanau | |
| HV | Stendal District | Saxony-Anhalt | Havelberg | |
| HVL | Havelland District | Brandenburg | Havelland | |
| HWI | Wismar City (A subdivision of Nordwestmecklenburg District) | Mecklenburg-Vorpommern | Hansestadt Wismar | |
| HX | Höxter District | North Rhine-Westphalia | Höxter | |
| HY | Bautzen District | Saxony | Hoyerswerda | |
| HZ | Harz District | Saxony-Anhalt | Harz | |

Codes starting with letter I
| Code | City / rural district | State | Namesake | Notes |
|---|---|---|---|---|
| IGB | St. Ingbert City (A subdivision of Saarpfalz District) | Saarland | St. Ingbert | |
| IK | Ilm District | Thuringia | Ilm-Kreis | |
| IL | Ilm District | Thuringia | Ilmenau | |
| ILL | Neu-Ulm District | Bavaria | Illertissen | |
| IN | Ingolstadt City | Bavaria | Ingolstadt | |
| IZ | Steinburg District | Schleswig-Holstein | Itzehoe | |

Codes starting with letter J
| Code | City / rural district | State | Namesake | Notes |
|---|---|---|---|---|
| J | Jena City | Thuringia | Jena | |
| JE | Wittenberg District | Saxony-Anhalt | Jessen | |
| JL | Jerichower Land District | Saxony-Anhalt | Jerichower Land | |
| JÜL | Düren District | North Rhine-Westphalia | Jülich | |

Codes starting with letter K
| Code | City / rural district | State | Namesake | Notes |
|---|---|---|---|---|
| K | Cologne City | North Rhine-Westphalia | Köln | |
| KA | Karlsruhe City | Baden-Württemberg | Karlsruhe | From [KA-AA 100 to 999] to [KA-ZZ 100 to 999] From [KA-NA 1000 to 9999] to [KA-ZZ 1000 to 9999] [KA-X 1 to 999] Where X is: B, F, G, Q [KA-XY 1 to 99] Where either X or Y or both are: B, F, G, Q |
| KA | Karlsruhe District | Baden-Württemberg | Karlsruhe | From [KA-A 1000 to 9999] to [KA-Z 1000 to 9999] From [KA-AA 1000 to 9999] to [KA-MZ 1000 to 9999] [KA-X 1 to 999] Where X is not: B, F, G, Q [KA-XY 1 to 99] Where neither X nor Y are: B, F, G, Q |
| KB | Waldeck-Frankenberg District | Hesse | Korbach | |
| KC | Kronach District | Bavaria | Kronach | |
| KE | Kempten (Allgäu) City | Bavaria | Kempten | From [KE-A 1 to 999] to [KE-Z 1 to 999] From [KE-AA 1 to 99] to [KE-ZZ 1 to 99] |
| KEH | Kelheim District | Bavaria | Kelheim | |
| KEL | Ortenau District | Baden-Württemberg | Kehl | |
| KEM | Bayreuth District | Bavaria | Kemnath | From [KEM-AT 1 to 99] to [KEM-ZT 1 to 99] |
| KEM | Tirschenreuth District | Bavaria | Kemnath | Every other available combination |
| KF | Kaufbeuren City | Bavaria | Kaufbeuren | |
| KG | Bad Kissingen District | Bavaria | Bad Kissingen | |
| KH | Bad Kreuznach District (Excluding Bad Kreuznach City) | Rhineland-Palatinate | Bad Kreuznach | From [KH-AA 1 to 999] to [KH-ZZ 1 to 999] |
| KH | Bad Kreuznach City (A subdivision of Bad Kreuznach District) | Rhineland-Palatinate | Bad Kreuznach | From [KH-A 1 to 9999] to [KH-Z 1 to 9999] |
| KI | Kiel City | Schleswig-Holstein | Kiel | |
| KIB | Donnersberg District | Rhineland-Palatinate | Kirchheimbolanden | |
| KK | Viersen District | North Rhine-Westphalia | Kempen-Krefeld | |
| KL | Kaiserslautern District | Rhineland-Palatinate | Kaiserslautern | From [KL-AA 100 to 999] to [KL-ZZ 100 to 999] [KL-X 1 to 999] Where X is: B, F, G, I, O, Q [KL-XY 1 to 99] Where either X or Y or both are: B, F, G, I, O, Q |
| KL | Kaiserslautern City | Rhineland-Palatinate | Kaiserslautern | [KL-X 1 to 9999] Where X isn't: B, F, G, I, O, Q [KL-XY 1 to 99] Where neither X nor Y are: B, F, G, I, O, Q |
| KLE | Kleve District | North Rhine-Westphalia | Kleve | |
| KLZ | Altmark District Salzwedel | Saxony-Anhalt | Klötze | |
| KM | Bautzen District | Saxony | Kamenz | |
| KN | Konstanz District (Excluding Büsingen am Hochrhein Municipality) | Baden-Württemberg | Konstanz | |
| KO | Koblenz City | Rhineland-Palatinate | Koblenz | |
| KÖN | Rhön-Grabfeld District | Bavaria | Bad Königshofen | |
| KÖT | Anhalt-Bitterfeld District | Saxony-Anhalt | Köthen | |
| KÖZ | Cham District | Bavaria | Bad Kötzting | |
| KR | Krefeld City | North Rhine-Westphalia | Krefeld | |
| KRU | Günzburg District | Bavaria | Krumbach | |
| KS | Kassel District; Kassel City | Hesse | Kassel | |
| KT | Kitzingen District | Bavaria | Kitzingen | |
| KU | Kulmbach District | Bavaria | Kulmbach | |
| KÜN | Hohenlohe District | Baden-Württemberg | Künzelsau | |
| KUS | Kusel District | Rhineland-Palatinate | Kusel | |
| KW | Dahme-Spreewald District | Brandenburg | Königs Wusterhausen | |
| KY | Ostprignitz-Ruppin District | Brandenburg | Kyritz | |
| KYF | Kyffhäuser District | Thuringia | Kyffhäuser | |

Codes starting with letter L
| Code | City / rural district | State | Namesake | Notes |
|---|---|---|---|---|
| L | Leipzig City | Saxony | Leipzig | From [L-A 1 to 9999] to [L-T 1 to 9999] From [L-AA 1 to 9999] to [L-TZ 1 to 9999] |
| L | Leipzig District | Saxony | Leipzig | From [L-U 1 to 9999] to [L-Z 1 to 9999] From [L-UA 1 to 9999] to [L-ZZ 1 to 9999] |
| LA | Landshut District | Bavaria | Landshut | From [LA-AA 5000 to 9999] to [LA-ZZ 5000 to 9999] From [LA-AA 100 to 999] to [LA-ZZ 100 to 999] [LA-X 1 to 9999] Where X is: B, F, G, I, O, Q [LA-XY 1 to 99] Where either X or Y or both are: B, F, G, I, O, Q |
| LA | Landshut City | Bavaria | Landshut | From [LA-AA 1000 to 4999] to [LA-ZZ 1000 to 4999] [LA-X 1 to 9999] Where X isn't: B, F, G, I, O, Q [LA-XY 1 to 99] Where neither X nor Y are: B, F, G, I, O, Q |
| LAN | Dingolfing-Landau District | Bavaria | Landau | |
| LAU | Nürnberger Land District | Bavaria | Lauf | |
| LB | Ludwigsburg District | Baden-Württemberg | Ludwigsburg | |
| LBS | Saale-Orla District | Thuringia | Bad Lobenstein | |
| LBZ | Ludwigslust-Parchim District | Mecklenburg-Vorpommern | Lübz | |
| LC | Dahme-Spreewald District | Brandenburg | Luckau | |
| LD | Landau in der Pfalz City | Rhineland-Palatinate | Landau | |
| LDK | Lahn-Dill District (Excluding Wetzlar City) | Hesse | Lahn-Dill-Kreis | |
| LDS | Dahme-Spreewald District | Brandenburg | Landkreis Dahme-Spreewald | |
| LEO | Böblingen District | Baden-Württemberg | Leonberg | |
| LER | Leer District | Lower Saxony | Leer | |
| LEV | Leverkusen City | North Rhine-Westphalia | Leverkusen | |
| LF | Altötting District | Bavaria | Laufen | [LF-X 1 to 999] Where X is: C, I, J, L, M, O, Q, V [LF-E 1 to 599] |
| LF | Traunstein District | Bavaria | Laufen | [LF-XY 100 to 999] Where XY is: FZ, GH, KQ, RW, TS, WW, XX, ZZ [LF-X 1 to 999] Where X is: B, F, G [LF-XY 1 to 99] Where XY is: DH, FZ, GH, KQ, LU, RW, TK, TS, WW, XX, ZZ [LF-DH 100 to 199] [LF-LU 100 to 299] [LF-TK 100 to 199] [LF-VW 200 to 499] |
| LF | Berchtesgadener Land District | Bavaria | Laufen | Every other available combination |
| LG | Lüneburg District | Lower Saxony | Lüneburg | |
| LH | Coesfeld District; Unna District | North Rhine-Westphalia | Lüdinghausen | |
| LI | Lindau (Bodensee) District | Bavaria | Lindau | |
| LIB | Elbe-Elster District | Brandenburg | Bad Liebenwerda | |
| LIF | Lichtenfels District | Bavaria | Lichtenfels | |
| LIP | Lippe District | North Rhine-Westphalia | Lippe | |
| LL | Landsberg District | Bavaria | Landsberg am Lech | |
| LM | Limburg-Weilburg District | Hesse | Limburg | |
| LN | Dahme-Spreewald District | Brandenburg | Lübben | |
| LÖ | Lörrach District | Baden-Württemberg | Lörrach | |
| LÖB | Görlitz District | Saxony | Löbau | |
| LOS | Oder-Spree District | Brandenburg | Landkreis Oder-Spree | |
| LP | Soest District | North Rhine-Westphalia | Lippstadt | |
| LR | Ortenau District | Baden-Württemberg | Lahr | |
| LRO | Rostock District | Mecklenburg-Vorpommern | Landkreis Rostock | |
| LSA | Saxony-Anhalt Government, Landtag, and Police | Saxony-Anhalt | Land Sachsen-Anhalt | Code reserved for Saxony-Anhalt State-owned governmental vehicles |
| LSN | Saxony Government and Landtag, | Saxony | Landtag Sachsen | Code reserved for Saxony State-owned governmental vehicles |
| LSZ | Unstrut-Hainich District | Thuringia | Bad Langensalza | |
| LU | Ludwigshafen am Rhein City | Rhineland-Palatinate | Ludwigshafen | |
| LÜN | Unna District | North Rhine-Westphalia | Lünen | |
| LUP | Ludwigslust-Parchim District | Mecklenburg-Vorpommern | Ludwigslust-Parchim | |
| LWL | Ludwigslust-Parchim District | Mecklenburg-Vorpommern | Ludwigslust | |

Codes starting with letter M
| Code | City / rural district | State | Namesake | Notes |
|---|---|---|---|---|
| M | Munich City | Bavaria | München | [M-X 1 to 9999] Where X is: B, F, G [M-XY 1 to 99] Where either X or Y or both are: B, F, G [M-XY 100 to 9999] Where neither X nor Y are: I, O, Q Unless either X or Y is: B, F, G In addition, XY can be any other combination of letters. |
| M | Munich District | Bavaria | München | [M-X 1 to 9999] Where X isn't: B, F, G [M-XY 1 to 99] Where neither X nor Y: B, F, G [M-XY 100 to 9999] Where either X or Y or both are: I, O, Q But neither X nor Y are: B, F, G |
| MA | Mannheim City | Baden-Württemberg | Mannheim | |
| MAB | Erzgebirge District | Saxony | Marienberg | |
| MAI | Landshut District | Bavaria | Mainburg | [MAI-X 1 to 9999] Where X is: B, F, G, I, O, Q |
| MAI | Kelheim District | Bavaria | Mainburg | Every other available combination |
| MAK | Wunsiedel im Fichtelgebirge District | Bavaria | Marktredwitz | |
| MAL | Landshut District | Bavaria | Mallersdorf-Pfaffenberg | [MAL-X 1 to 9999] Where X is: B, F, G, I, O, Q |
| MAL | Straubing-Bogen District | Bavaria | Mallersdorf-Pfaffenberg | Every other available combination |
| MB | Miesbach District | Bavaria | Miesbach | |
| MC | Mecklenburgische Seenplatte District (Excluding Neubrandenburg City) | Mecklenburg-Vorpommern | Malchin | |
| MD | Magdeburg City | Saxony-Anhalt | Magdeburg | |
| ME | Mettmann District | North Rhine-Westphalia | Mettmann | |
| MED | Dithmarschen District | Schleswig-Holstein | Meldorf | |
| MEG | Schwalm-Eder District | Hesse | Melsungen | |
| MEI | Meißen District | Saxony | Meißen | |
| MEK | Erzgebirge District | Saxony | Mittlerer Erzgebirgskreis | |
| MEL | Osnabrück District | Lower Saxony | Melle | |
| MER | Saale District | Saxony-Anhalt | Merseburg | |
| MET | Rhön-Grabfeld District | Bavaria | Mellrichstadt | |
| MG | Mönchengladbach City | North Rhine-Westphalia | Mönchengladbach | |
| MGH | Main-Tauber District | Baden-Württemberg | Bad Mergentheim | |
| MGN | Schmalkalden-Meiningen District | Thuringia | Meiningen | |
| MH | Mülheim an der Ruhr City | North Rhine-Westphalia | Mülheim | |
| MHL | Unstrut-Hainich District | Thuringia | Mühlhausen | |
| MI | Minden-Lübbecke District | North Rhine-Westphalia | Minden | |
| MIL | Miltenberg District | Bavaria | Miltenberg | |
| MK | Märkischer District | North Rhine-Westphalia | Märkischer Kreis | |
| MKK | Main-Kinzig District (Excluding Hanau City) | Hesse | Main-Kinzig-Kreis | |
| ML | Mansfeld-Südharz District | Saxony-Anhalt | Mansfelder Land | |
| MM | Memmingen City | Bavaria | Memmingen | |
| MN | Unterallgäu District | Bavaria | Mindelheim | |
| MO | Wesel District | North Rhine-Westphalia | Moers | |
| MOD | Ostallgäu District | Bavaria | Marktoberdorf | |
| MOL | Märkisch-Oderland District | Brandenburg | Märkisch-Oderland | |
| MON | Aachen Region; Düren District | North Rhine-Westphalia | Monschau | |
| MOS | Neckar-Odenwald District | Baden-Württemberg | Mosbach | |
| MQ | Saale District | Saxony-Anhalt | Merseburg-Querfurt | |
| MR | Marburg-Biedenkopf District | Hesse | Marburg | |
| MS | Münster City | North Rhine-Westphalia | Münster | |
| MSE | Mecklenburgische Seenplatte District (Excluding Neubrandenburg City) | Mecklenburg-Vorpommern | Mecklenburgische Seenplatte | |
| MSH | Mansfeld-Südharz District | Saxony-Anhalt | Mansfeld-Südharz | |
| MSP | Main-Spessart District | Bavaria | Main-Spessart | |
| MST | Mecklenburgische Seenplatte District (Excluding Neubrandenburg City) | Mecklenburg-Vorpommern | Mecklenburg-Strelitz | |
| MTK | Main-Taunus District | Hesse | Main-Taunus-Kreis | |
| MTL | Leipzig District | Saxony | Muldental | |
| MÜ | Mühldorf am Inn District | Bavaria | Mühldorf | |
| MÜB | Bayreuth District | Bavaria | Münchberg | From [MÜB-A 100 to 999] to [MÜB-M 100 to 999] From [MÜB-N 1 to 999] to [MÜB-Z 1 to 999] |
| MÜB | Hof District | Bavaria | Münchberg | Every other available combination |
| MÜR | Mecklenburgische Seenplatte District (Excluding Neubrandenburg City) | Mecklenburg-Vorpommern | Müritz | |
| MVL | Mecklenburg-Vorpommern Government, Landtag, and Police | Mecklenburg-Vorpommern | Mecklenburg-Vorpommerscher Landtag | Code reserved for Mecklenburg-Vorpommern State-owned governmental vehicles |
| MW | Mittelsachsen District | Saxony | Mittweida | |
| MY | Mayen-Koblenz District | Rhineland-Palatinate | Mayen | |
| MYK | Mayen-Koblenz District | Rhineland-Palatinate | Mayen-Koblenz | |
| MZ | Mainz City | Rhineland-Palatinate | Mainz | From [MZ-AA 100 to 999] to [MZ-ZZ 100 to 999] From [MZ-AA 1000 to 9999] to [MZ-KY 1000 to 9999] [MZ-X 1 to 999] Where X is: B, F, G, I, O, Q [MZ-XY 1 to 99] Where either X or Y or both are: B, F, G, I, O, Q |
| MZ | Mainz-Bingen District | Rhineland-Palatinate | Mainz | From [MZ-A 1000 to 9999] to [MZ-Z 1000 to 9999] From [MZ-LA 1000 to 9999] to [MZ-ZZ 1000 to 9999] [MZ-X 1 to 999] Where X isn't: B, F, G, I, O, Q [MZ-XY 1 to 99] Where neither X nor Y are: B, F, G, I, O, Q |
| MZG | Merzig-Wadern District | Saarland | Merzig | |

Codes starting with letter N
| Code | City / rural district | State | Namesake | Notes |
|---|---|---|---|---|
| N | Nuremberg City | Bavaria | Nürnberg | From [N-A 1000 to 9999] to [N-Z 1000 to 9999] From [N-AA 100 to 9999] to [N-ZZ 100 to 9999] [N-X 1 to 999] Where X is: B, F, G, I, O, Q [N-XY 1 to 99] Where either X or Y or both are: B, F, G, I, O, Q |
| N | Nürnberger Land District | Bavaria | Nürnberg | [N-X 1 to 999] Where X isn't: B, F, G, I, O, Q, S |
| NAB | Schwandorf District | Bavaria | Nabburg | [NAB-X 1 to 999] Where X is: B, F, G |
| NAB | Amberg-Sulzbach District | Bavaria | Nabburg | Every other available combination |
| NAI | Hof District | Bavaria | Naila | |
| NAU | Havelland District | Brandenburg | Nauen | |
| NB | Neubrandenburg City (A subdivision of Mecklenburgische Seenplatte District) | Mecklenburg-Vorpommern | Neubrandenburg | From [NB-AA 1 to 999] to [NB-ZZ 1 to 999] |
| ND | Neuburg-Schrobenhausen District | Bavaria | Neuburg an der Donau | |
| NDH | Nordhausen District | Thuringia | Nordhausen | |
| NE | Rhein District Neuss | North Rhine-Westphalia | Neuss | |
| NEA | Neustadt an der Aisch-Bad Windsheim District | Bavaria | Neustadt an der Aisch | |
| NEB | Burgenland District | Saxony-Anhalt | Nebra | |
| NEC | Coburg City; Coburg District | Bavaria | Neustadt bei Coburg | |
| NEN | Schwandorf District | Bavaria | Neunburg | |
| NES | Rhön-Grabfeld District | Bavaria | Bad Neustadt an der Saale | |
| NEW | Neustadt an der Waldnaab District | Bavaria | Neustadt an der Waldnaab | |
| NF | Nordfriesland District | Schleswig-Holstein | Nordfriesland | |
| NH | Sonneberg District | Thuringia | Neuhaus | |
| NI | Nienburg/Weser District | Lower Saxony | Nienburg | |
| NK | Neunkirchen District | Saarland | Neunkirchen | |
| NL | Lower Saxony Government and Landtag | Lower Saxony | Niedersächsischer Landtag | Code reserved for Lower Saxony State-owned governmental vehicles |
| NM | Neumarkt in der Oberpfalz District | Bavaria | Neumarkt | |
| NMB | Burgenland District | Saxony-Anhalt | Naumburg | |
| NMS | Neumünster City | Schleswig-Holstein | Neumünster | |
| NÖ | Donau-Ries District | Bavaria | Nördlingen | |
| NOH | Grafschaft Bentheim District | Lower Saxony | Nordhorn | |
| NOL | Görlitz District | Saxony | Niederschlesische Oberlausitz | |
| NOM | Northeim District | Lower Saxony | Northeim | |
| NOR | Aurich District | Lower Saxony | Norden | |
| NP | Ostprignitz-Ruppin District | Brandenburg | Neuruppin | |
| NR | Neuwied District (Excluding Neuwied City) | Rhineland-Palatinate | Neuwied am Rhein | From [NR-AA 1 to 999] to [NR-ZZ 1 to 999] |
| NR | Neuwied City (A subdivision of Neuwied District) | Rhineland-Palatinate | Neuwied am Rhein | From [NR-A 1 to 9999] to [NR-Z 1 to 9999] |
| NRW | North Rhine-Westphalia Government, Landtag, and State Police | North Rhine-Westphalia | Nordrhein-Westfalen | Code reserved for North Rhine-Westphalia State-owned governmental vehicles |
| NT | Esslingen District | Baden-Württemberg | Nürtingen | |
| NU | Neu-Ulm District | Bavaria | Neu-Ulm | |
| NVP | Vorpommern-Rügen District (Excluding Stralsund City) | Mecklenburg-Vorpommern | Nordvorpommern | |
| NW | Neustadt an der Weinstraße City | Rhineland-Palatinate | Neustadt an der Weinstraße | |
| NWM | Nordwestmecklenburg District (Excluding Wismar City) | Mecklenburg-Vorpommern | Nordwestmecklenburg | |
| NY | Görlitz District | Saxony | Niesky | |
| NZ | Mecklenburgische Seenplatte District (Excluding Neubrandenburg City) | Mecklenburg-Vorpommern | Neustrelitz | |

Codes starting with letter O
| Code | City / rural district | State | Namesake | Notes |
|---|---|---|---|---|
| OA | Oberallgäu District | Bavaria | Oberallgäu | |
| OAL | Ostallgäu District | Bavaria | Ostallgäu | |
| OB | Oberhausen City | North Rhine-Westphalia | Oberhausen | |
| OBB | Miltenberg District | Bavaria | Obernburg | |
| OBG | Stendal District | Saxony-Anhalt | Osterburg | |
| OC | Börde District | Saxony-Anhalt | Oschersleben | |
| OCH | Würzburg District | Bavaria | Ochsenfurt | |
| OD | Stormarn District | Schleswig-Holstein | Bad Oldesloe | |
| OE | Olpe District | North Rhine-Westphalia | Olpe | |
| OF | Offenbach District; Offenbach am Main City | Hesse | Offenbach | |
| OG | Ortenau District | Baden-Württemberg | Offenburg | |
| OH | Ostholstein District | Schleswig-Holstein | Ostholstein | |
| OHA | Göttingen District (Excluding Göttingen City) | Lower Saxony | Osterode am Harz | |
| ÖHR | Hohenlohe District | Baden-Württemberg | Öhringen | |
| OHV | Oberhavel District | Brandenburg | Oberhavel | |
| OHZ | Osterholz District | Lower Saxony | Osterholz-Scharmbeck | |
| OK | Börde District | Saxony-Anhalt | Ohrekreis | |
| OL | Oldenburg City | Lower Saxony | Oldenburg | From [OL-AA 100 to 999] to [OL-ZZ 100 to 999] [OL-X 1 to 999] Where X is: B, F, G, I, O, Q [OL-XY 1 to 99] Where either X or Y or both are: B, F, G, Q |
| OL | Oldenburg District | Lower Saxony | Oldenburg | From [OL-A 1000 to 9999] to [OL-Z 1000 to 9999] [OL-X 1 to 999] Where X isn't: B, F, G, I, O, Q [OL-XY 1 to 99] Where neither X nor Y are: B, F, G, I, O, Q |
| OP | Leverkusen City | North Rhine-Westphalia | Opladen | |
| OPR | Ostprignitz-Ruppin District | Brandenburg | Ostprignitz-Ruppin | |
| OS | Osnabrück District | Lower Saxony | Osnabrück | From [OS-AA 100 to 999] to [OS-ZZ 100 to 999] (Excludes [OS-PD 100 to 999], reserved for District Police); From [OS-AA 3000 to 9999] to [OS-ZZ 3000 to 9999] [OS-X 1 to 9999] Where X is: B, F, G, I, O, Q [OS-XY 1 to 99] Where either X or Y or both are: B, F, G, I, O, Q |
| OS | Osnabrück City | Lower Saxony | Osnabrück | From [OS-AA 1000 to 2999] to [OS-ZZ 1000 to 2999] [OS-X 1 to 9999] Where X isn't: B, F, G, I, O, Q (Excludes [OS-P 1 to 9999], reserved for City Police) [OS-XY 1 to 99] Where neither X nor Y are: B, F, G, I, O, Q |
| OSL | Oberspreewald-Lausitz District | Brandenburg | Oberspreewald-Lausitz | |
| OTW | Neunkirchen District | Saarland | Ottweiler | |
| OVI | Schwandorf District | Bavaria | Oberviechtach | |
| OVL | Vogtland District | Saxony | Obervogtland | |
| OZ | Nordsachsen District | Saxony | Oschatz | |

Codes starting with letter P
| Code | City / rural district | State | Namesake | Notes |
|---|---|---|---|---|
| P | Potsdam City | Brandenburg | Potsdam | |
| PA | Passau City | Bavaria | Passau | From [PA-A 1 to 9999] to [PA-Z to 9999] |
| PA | Passau District | Bavaria | Passau | From [PA-AA 1 to 999] to [PA-ZZ 1 to 999] |
| PAF | Pfaffenhofen an der Ilm District | Bavaria | Pfaffenhofen | |
| PAN | Rottal-Inn District | Bavaria | Pfarrkirchen | |
| PAR | Kelheim District | Bavaria | Parsberg | [PAR-Q 1 to 999], [PAR-Y 1 to 999] [PAR-BB 1 to 999], [PAR-CC 1 to 9999] |
| PAR | Neumarkt in der Oberpfalz District | Bavaria | Parsberg | Every other available combination |
| PB | Paderborn District | North Rhine-Westphalia | Paderborn | |
| PCH | Ludwigslust-Parchim District | Mecklenburg-Vorpommern | Parchim | |
| PE | Peine District | Lower Saxony | Peine | |
| PEG | Nürnberger Land District | Bavaria | Pegnitz | [PEG-A 1 to 999] |
| PEG | Bayreuth District | Bavaria | Pegnitz | From [PEG-B 1 to 999] to [PEG-Z 1 to 999] |
| PEG | Forchheim District | Bavaria | Pegnitz | From [PEG-AA 1 to 99] to [PEG-ZZ 1 to 99] From [PEG-A 1000 to 9999] to [PEG-Z 1000 to 9999] |
| PF | Pforzheim City | Baden-Württemberg | Pforzheim | From [PF-AA 100 to 999] to [PF-ZZ 100 to 999] From [PF-NA 1000 to 9999] to [PF-ZZ 1000 to 9999] [PF-X 1 to 999] Where X is: B, F, G, I, O, Q [PF-XY 1 to 99] Where either X or Y or both are: B, F, G, I, O, Q |
| PF | Enz District | Baden-Württemberg | Pforzheim | From [PF-A 1000 to 9999] to [PF-Z 1000 to 9999] From [PF-AA 1000 to 9999] to [PF-MZ 1000 to 9999] [PF-X 1 to 999] Where X isn't: B, F, G, I, O, Q [PF-XY 1 to 99] Where neither X nor Y are: B, F, G, I, O, Q |
| PI | Pinneberg District | Schleswig-Holstein | Pinneberg | |
| PIR | Sächsische Schweiz-Osterzgebirge District | Saxony | Pirna | |
| PL | Vogtland District | Saxony | Plauen | |
| PLÖ | Plön District | Schleswig-Holstein | Plön | |
| PM | Potsdam-Mittelmark District | Brandenburg | Potsdam-Mittelmark | |
| PN | Saale-Orla District | Thuringia | Pößneck | |
| PR | Prignitz District | Brandenburg | Prignitz | |
| PRÜ | Eifel District Bitburg-Prüm | Rhineland-Palatinate | Prüm | |
| PS | Pirmasens City | Rhineland-Palatinate | Pirmasens | From [PS-A 1 to 9999] to [PS-Z 1 to 9999] |
| PS | Südwestpfalz District | Rhineland-Palatinate | Pirmasens | From [PS-AA 1 to 999] to [PS-ZZ 1 to 999] |
| PW | Vorpommern-Greifswald District (Excluding Greifswald City) | Mecklenburg-Vorpommern | Pasewalk | |
| PZ | Uckermark District | Brandenburg | Prenzlau | |

Codes starting with letter Q
| Code | City / rural district | State | Namesake | Notes |
|---|---|---|---|---|
| QFT | Saale District | Saxony-Anhalt | Querfurt | |
| QLB | Harz District | Saxony-Anhalt | Quedlinburg | |

Codes starting with letter R
| Code | City / rural district | State | Namesake | Notes |
|---|---|---|---|---|
| R | Regensburg City | Bavaria | Regensburg | From [R-AA 100 to 999] to [R-ZZ 100 to 999] From [R-MN 1000 to 9999] to [R-ZZ 1000 to 9999] [R-X 1 to 999] Where X is: B, F, G, I, O, Q [R-XY 1 to 99] Where either X or Y or both are: B, F, G, I, O, Q (Excludes [R-PR 100 to 999], reserved for City Police) |
| R | Regensburg District | Bavaria | Regensburg | From [R-A 1000 to 9999] to [R-Z 1000 to 9999] From [R-AA 1000 to 9999] to [R-MM 1000 to 9999] [R-X 1 to 999] Where X isn't: B, F, G, I, O, Q [R-XY 1 to 99] Where neither X nor Y are: B, F, G, I, O, Q |
| RA | Rastatt District | Baden-Württemberg | Rastatt | |
| RC | Vogtland District | Saxony | Reichenbach | |
| RD | Rendsburg-Eckernförde District | Schleswig-Holstein | Rendsburg | |
| RDG | Vorpommern-Rügen District (Excluding Stralsund City) | Mecklenburg-Vorpommern | Ribnitz-Damgarten | |
| RE | Recklinghausen District | North Rhine-Westphalia | Recklinghausen | |
| REG | Regen District | Bavaria | Regen | |
| REH | Wunsiedel im Fichtelgebirge District | Bavaria | Rehau | [REH-AU 900 to 999] [REH-X 1 to 999] Where X is: A, E, F, H, J, M, N, P, R, S, V, X [REH-XY 100 to 999] Where XY is: AA, FF, GG, OO, ZZ |
| REH | Hof District | Bavaria | Rehau | Every other available combination |
| REI | Berchtesgadener Land District | Bavaria | Bad Reichenhall | |
| RG | Meißen District | Saxony | Riesa-Großenhain | |
| RH | Roth District | Bavaria | Roth | |
| RI | Schaumburg District | Lower Saxony | Rinteln | |
| RID | Kelheim District | Bavaria | Riedenburg | |
| RIE | Meißen District | Saxony | Riesa | |
| RL | Mittelsachsen District | Saxony | Rochlitz | |
| RM | Mecklenburgische Seenplatte District (Excluding Neubrandenburg City) | Mecklenburg-Vorpommern | Röbel/Müritz | |
| RN | Havelland District | Brandenburg | Rathenow | |
| RO | Rosenheim District | Bavaria | Rosenheim | From [RO-A 1000 to 9999] to [RO-Z 1000 to 9999] From [RO-AA 10 to 9999] to [RO-ZZ 100 to 9999] [RO-X 1 to 999] Where X is: B, F, G, I, O, Q [RO-XY 1 to 99] Where either X or Y or both are: B, F, G, I, O, Q |
| RO | Rosenheim City | Bavaria | Rosenheim | [RO-X 1 to 999] Where X isn't: B, F, G, I, O, Q [RO-XY 1 to 99] Where neither X nor Y are: B, F, G, I, O, Q |
| ROD | Schwandorf District | Bavaria | Roding | [RO-B 1 to 599], [RO-F 1 to 799] [RO-G 50 to 499] [RO-I 100 to 1999] (Excludes [RO-P 100 to 999], reserved for City Police) |
| ROD | Cham District | Bavaria | Roding | Every other available combination |
| ROF | Hersfeld-Rotenburg District | Hesse | Rotenburg an der Fulda | |
| ROK | Donnersberg District | Rhineland-Palatinate | Rockenhausen | |
| ROL | Landshut District | Bavaria | Rottenburg an der Laaber | From [ROL-AA 1 to 999] to [ROL-ZZ 1 to 999] [ROL-X 1 to 9999] Where X is: B, F, G, I, O, Q |
| ROL | Kelheim District | Bavaria | Rottenburg an der Laaber | Every other available combination |
| ROS | Rostock District | Mecklenburg-Vorpommern | Rostock | |
| ROT | Ansbach District | Bavaria | Rothenburg ob der Tauber | |
| ROW | Rotenburg (Wümme) District | Lower Saxony | Rotenburg (Wümme) | |
| RP | Rhein-Pfalz District | Rhineland-Palatinate | Rhein-Pfalz | |
| RPL | Rhineland-Palatinate Government, Landtag, and State Police | Rhineland-Palatinate | Rheinland-Pfälzischer Landtag | Code reserved for Rhineland-Palatinate State-owned governmental vehicles |
| RS | Remscheid City | North Rhine-Westphalia | Remscheid | |
| RSL | Dessau-Roßlau City | Saxony-Anhalt | Dessau-Rosslau | |
| RT | Reutlingen District | Baden-Württemberg | Reutlingen | |
| RU | Saalfeld-Rudolstadt District | Thuringia | Rudolstadt | |
| RÜD | Rheingau-Taunus District | Hesse | Rüdesheim | |
| RÜG | Vorpommern-Rügen District (Excluding Stralsund City) | Mecklenburg-Vorpommern | Rügen | |
| RV | Ravensburg District | Baden-Württemberg | Ravensburg | |
| RW | Rottweil District | Baden-Württemberg | Rottweil | |
| RZ | Herzogtum Lauenburg District | Schleswig-Holstein | Ratzeburg | |

Codes starting with letter S
| Code | City / rural district | State | Namesake | Notes |
|---|---|---|---|---|
| S | Stuttgart City | Baden-Württemberg | Stuttgart | |
| SAB | Trier-Saarburg District | Rhineland-Palatinate | Saarburg | |
| SAD | Schwandorf District | Bavaria | Schwandorf | |
| SÄK | Waldshut District | Baden-Württemberg | Bad Säckingen | |
| SAL | Saarland Government, Landtag, and State Police | Saarland | Saarländischer Landtag | Code reserved for Saarland State-owned governmental vehicles |
| SAN | Kronach District | Bavaria | Stadtsteinach | From [SAN-S 1 to 999] to [SAN-V 1 to 999] From [SAN-AA 1 to 99] to [SAN-FZ 1 to 99] |
| SAN | Kulmbach District | Bavaria | Stadtsteinach | From [SAN-A 1 to 999] to [SAN-R 1 to 999] From [SAN-JA 1 to 99] to [SAN-ZZ 1 to 99] |
| SAN | Hof District | Bavaria | Stadtsteinach | From [SAN-W 1 to 999] to [SAN-Z 1 to 999] From [SAN-GA 1 to 999] to [SAN-IZ 1 to 999] |
| SAW | Altmark District Salzwedel | Saxony-Anhalt | Salzwedel | |
| SB | Saarbrücken Region (Excluding Völklingen City) | Saarland | Saarbrücken | |
| SBG | Vorpommern-Greifswald District (Excluding Greifswald City) | Mecklenburg-Vorpommern | Strasburg | |
| SBK | Salzland District | Saxony-Anhalt | Schönebeck | |
| SC | Schwabach City | Bavaria | Schwabach | |
| SCZ | Saale-Orla District | Thuringia | Schleiz | |
| SDH | Kyffhäuser District | Thuringia | Sondershausen | |
| SDL | Stendal District | Saxony-Anhalt | Stendal | |
| SDT | Uckermark District | Brandenburg | Schwedt | |
| SE | Segeberg District | Schleswig-Holstein | Bad Segeberg | |
| SEB | Sächsische Schweiz-Osterzgebirge District | Saxony | Sebnitz | |
| SEE | Märkisch-Oderland District | Brandenburg | Seelow | |
| SEF | Neustadt an der Aisch-Bad Windsheim District | Bavaria | Scheinfeld | |
| SEL | Wunsiedel im Fichtelgebirge District | Bavaria | Selb | |
| SFB | Oberspreewald-Lausitz District | Brandenburg | Senftenberg | |
| SFT | Salzland District | Saxony-Anhalt | Staßfurt | |
| SG | Solingen City | North Rhine-Westphalia | Solingen | |
| SGH | Mansfeld-Südharz District | Saxony-Anhalt | Sangerhausen | |
| SH | Schleswig-Holstein Government, Landtag, and Schleswig-Holstein Police | Schleswig-Holstein | Schleswig-Holstein | Code reserved for Schleswig-Holstein State-owned governmental vehicles |
| SHA | Schwäbisch Hall District | Baden-Württemberg | Schwäbisch Hall | |
| SHG | Schaumburg District | Lower Saxony | Stadthagen | |
| SHK | Saale-Holzland District | Thuringia | Saale-Holzland-Kreis | |
| SHL | Suhl City | Thuringia | Suhl | |
| SI | Siegen-Wittgenstein District | North Rhine-Westphalia | Siegen | |
| SIG | Sigmaringen District | Baden-Württemberg | Sigmaringen | |
| SIM | Rhein-Hunsrück District | Rhineland-Palatinate | Simmern | |
| SK | Saale District | Saxony-Anhalt | Saalekreis | |
| SL | Schleswig-Flensburg District | Schleswig-Holstein | Schleswig | |
| SLE | Düren District; Euskirchen District | North Rhine-Westphalia | Schleiden | |
| SLF | Saalfeld-Rudolstadt District | Thuringia | Saalfeld | |
| SLG | Ravensburg District | Baden-Württemberg | Bad Saulgau | [SLG-X 1 to 9999] Where X is: A, M, P, Q, W From [SLG-AX 1 to 999] to [SLG-ZX 1 to 999] Where X is: U, Y |
| SLG | Sigmaringen District | Baden-Württemberg | Bad Saulgau | [SLG-X 1 to 9999] Where X is: B, D, F, H, N, O, R, S, T, Y From [SLG-AX 1 to 999] to [SLG-ZX 1 to 999] Where X is: From A to J |
| SLK | Salzland District | Saxony-Anhalt | Salzlandkreis | |
| SLN | Altenburger Land District | Thuringia | Schmölln | |
| SLS | Saarlouis District | Saarland | Saarlouis | |
| SLÜ | Main-Kinzig District (Excluding Hanau City) | Hesse | Schlüchtern | |
| SLZ | Wartburg District | Thuringia | Bad Salzungen | |
| SM | Schmalkalden-Meiningen District | Thuringia | Schmalkalden | |
| SMÜ | Augsburg District | Bavaria | Schwabmünchen | |
| SN | Schwerin City | Mecklenburg-Vorpommern | Schwerin | |
| SO | Soest District | North Rhine-Westphalia | Soest | |
| SOB | Neuburg-Schrobenhausen District | Bavaria | Schrobenhausen | |
| SOG | Weilheim-Schongau District | Bavaria | Schongau | |
| SOK | Saale-Orla District | Thuringia | Saale-Orla-Kreis | |
| SÖM | Sömmerda District | Thuringia | Sömmerda | |
| SON | Sonneberg District | Thuringia | Sonneberg | |
| SP | Speyer City | Rhineland-Palatinate | Speyer | |
| SPB | Spree-Neiße District | Brandenburg | Spremberg | |
| SPN | Spree-Neiße District | Brandenburg | Spree-Neiße | |
| SR | Straubing City | Bavaria | Straubing | From [SR-A 1 to 9999] to [SR-Z 1 to 9999] (Excludes [SR-P 1000 to 9999], reserved for City Police) |
| SR | Straubing-Bogen District | Bavaria | Straubing | From [SR-AA 1 to 999] to [SR-ZZ 1 to 999] |
| SRB | Märkisch-Oderland District | Brandenburg | Strausberg | |
| SRO | Saale-Holzland District | Thuringia | Stadtroda | |
| ST | Steinfurt District | North Rhine-Westphalia | Steinfurt | |
| STA | Starnberg District | Bavaria | Starnberg | |
| STB | Ludwigslust-Parchim District | Mecklenburg-Vorpommern | Sternberg | |
| STD | Stade District | Lower Saxony | Stade | |
| STE | Lichtenfels District | Bavaria | Bad Staffelstein | |
| STL | Erzgebirge District | Saxony | Stollberg | |
| STO | Sigmaringen District | Baden-Württemberg | Stockach | [STO-X 1 to 9999] Where X is: B, D, F, H, N, O, R, S, T, Y From [STO-AX 1 to 999] to [STO-ZX 1 to 999] Where X is: From A to J |
| STO | Konstanz District (Excluding Büsingen am Hochrhein Municipality) | Baden-Württemberg | Stockach | [STO-X 1 to 9999] Where X is: C, E, G, I, J, K, L, V, X, Z From [STO-AX 1 to 999] to [STO-ZX 1 to 999] Where X is: From K to T |
| SU | Rhein-Sieg District | North Rhine-Westphalia | Siegburg | |
| SUL | Amberg-Sulzbach District | Bavaria | Sulzbach-Rosenberg | |
| SÜW | Südliche Weinstraße District | Rhineland-Palatinate | Südliche Weinstraße | |
| SW | Schweinfurt District | Bavaria | Schweinfurt | From [SW-AA 100 to 9999] to [SW-ZZ 100 to 9999] [SW-X 1 to 9999] Where X is: B, F, G, I, O, Q [SW-XY 1 to 99] Where either X or Y or both are: B, F, G, I, O, Q |
| SW | Schweinfurt City | Bavaria | Schweinfurt | [SW-X 1 to 9999] Where X isn't: B, F, G, I, O, Q [SW-XY 1 to 99] Where neither X nor Y are: B, F, G, I, O, Q |
| SWA | Rheingau-Taunus District | Hesse | Bad Schwalbach | |
| SY | Diepholz District | Lower Saxony | Syke | |
| SZ | Salzgitter City | Lower Saxony | Salzgitter | |
| SZB | Erzgebirge District | Saxony | Schwarzenberg | |

Codes starting with letter T
| Code | City / rural district | State | Namesake | Notes |
|---|---|---|---|---|
| TBB | Main-Tauber District | Baden-Württemberg | Tauberbischofsheim | |
| TDO | Nordsachsen District | Saxony | Torgau-Delitzsch-Oschatz | |
| TE | Steinfurt District | North Rhine-Westphalia | Tecklenburg | |
| TET | Rostock District | Mecklenburg-Vorpommern | Teterow | |
| TF | Teltow-Fläming District | Brandenburg | Teltow-Fläming | |
| TG | Nordsachsen District | Saxony | Torgau | |
| THL | Thuringia Government and Landtag | Thuringia | Thüringer Landtag | Code reserved for Thuringia State-owned governmental vehicles |
| THW | Federal Agency for Technical Relief | | Technisches Hilfswerk | Code reserved for Vehicles of German Federal Agency for Technical Relief. |
| TIR | Tirschenreuth District | Bavaria | Tirschenreuth | |
| TO | Nordsachsen District | Saxony | Torgau-Oschatz | |
| TÖL | Bad Tölz-Wolfratshausen District | Bavaria | Bad Tölz | |
| TP | Uckermark District | Brandenburg | Templin | |
| TR | Trier-Saarburg District; Trier City | Rhineland-Palatinate | Trier | |
| TS | Traunstein District | Bavaria | Traunstein | |
| TT | Bodensee (Lake Constance) District | Baden-Württemberg | Tettnang | |
| TÜ | Tübingen District | Baden-Württemberg | Tübingen | |
| TUT | Tuttlingen District | Baden-Württemberg | Tuttlingen | |

Codes starting with letter U
| Code | City / rural district | State | Namesake | Notes |
|---|---|---|---|---|
| ÜB | Sigmaringen District | Baden-Württemberg | Überlingen | [ÜB-X 1 to 999] Where X is: K, N, P, Q, U, W, Y, Z [ÜB-X 1000 to 9999] Where X is : A, E From [ÜB-XA 1 to 99] to [ÜB-XZ 1 to 99] Where X is: A, C, E [ÜB-XY 100 to 999] Where XY is: BB, HH, II, MM, NN, OO, XX [ÜB-XY 1000 to 9999] Where XY is: FF, GG, PP, RR, VV |
| ÜB | Ravensburg District | Baden-Württemberg | Überlingen | [ÜB-X 1 to 999] Where X is: A, C, E, G, I, J, L [ÜB-X 1000 to 9999] Where X is: B, X From [ÜB-XA 1 to 99] to [ÜB-XZ 1 to 99] Where X is: U, V, W, Y, Z [ÜB-XY 100 to 999] Where XY is: AA, DD, FF [ÜB-XY 1000 to 9999] Where XY is: KK, OO, TT, RV |
| ÜB | Bodensee (Lake Constance) District | Baden-Württemberg | Überlingen | [ÜB-X 1 to 999] Where X is: B, D, F, H, M, O, R, S, T, V, X [ÜB-X 1000 to 9999] Where X is not: A, B, E, X From [ÜB-XA 1 to 99] to [ÜB-XZ 1 to 99] Where X isn't: A, C, E, U, V, W, Y, Z [ÜB-XY 100 to 999] Where XY is not: AA, BB, DD, FF, HH, II, MM, NN, OO, XX [ÜB-XY 1000 to 9999] Where XY is not: FF, GG, KK, OO, PP, RR, RV, TT, VV |
| UE | Uelzen District | Lower Saxony | Uelzen | |
| UEM | Vorpommern-Greifswald District (Excluding Greifswald City) | Mecklenburg-Vorpommern | Ueckermünde | |
| UFF | Neustadt an der Aisch-Bad Windsheim District | Bavaria | Uffenheim | |
| UH | Unstrut-Hainich District | Thuringia | Unstrut-Hainich | |
| UL | Alb-Donau District | Baden-Württemberg | Ulm | From [UL-AA 100 to 999] to [UL-ZZ 100 to 999] From [UL-NA 1000 to 9999] to [UL-ZZ1000 to 9999] [UL-X 1 to 999] Where X is: B, F, G, I, O, Q [UL-XY 1 to 99] Where either X or Y or both are: B, F, G, I, O, Q |
| UL | Ulm City | Baden-Württemberg | Ulm | [UL-A 1000 to 4999], [UL-A 6000 to 9999] From [UL-B 1000 to 9999] to [UL-Z 1000 to 9999] [UL-X 1 to 999] Where X isn't: B, F, G, I, O, Q [UL-XY 1 to 99] Where neither X nor Y are: B, F, G, I, O, Q |
| UM | Uckermark District | Brandenburg | Uckermark | |
| UN | Unna District | North Rhine-Westphalia | Unna | |
| USI | Hochtaunus District | Hesse | Usingen | |

Codes starting with letter V
| Code | City / rural district | State | Namesake | Notes |
|---|---|---|---|---|
| V | Vogtland District | Saxony | Vogtland | |
| VAI | Ludwigsburg District | Baden-Württemberg | Vaihingen | |
| VB | Vogelsberg District | Hesse | Vogelsberg | |
| VEC | Vechta District | Lower Saxony | Vechta | |
| VER | Verden District | Lower Saxony | Verden | |
| VG | Vorpommern-Greifswald District (Excluding Greifswald City) | Mecklenburg-Vorpommern | Vorpommern-Greifswald | |
| VIB | Rottal-Inn District | Bavaria | Vilsbiburg | [VIB-X 1 to 9999] Where X is: B, I, O, Q] |
| VIB | Mühldorf am Inn District | Bavaria | Vilsbiburg | [VIB-G 1 to 9999] |
| VIB | Landshut District | Bavaria | Vilsbiburg | Every other available combination |
| VIE | Viersen District | North Rhine-Westphalia | Viersen | |
| VIT | Regen District | Bavaria | Viechtach | |
| VK | Völklingen City (A subdivision of Saarbrücken Region) | Saarland | Völklingen | |
| VOH | Neustadt an der Waldnaab District | Bavaria | Vohenstrauß | |
| VR | Vorpommern-Rügen District (Excluding Stralsund City) | Mecklenburg-Vorpommern | Vorpommern-Rügen | |
| VS | Schwarzwald-Baar District | Baden-Württemberg | Villingen-Schwenningen | |

Codes starting with letter W
| Code | City / rural district | State | Namesake | Notes |
|---|---|---|---|---|
| W | Wuppertal City | North Rhine-Westphalia | Wuppertal | |
| WA | Waldeck-Frankenberg District | Hesse | Waldeck | |
| WAF | Warendorf District | North Rhine-Westphalia | Warendorf | |
| WAK | Wartburg District | Thuringia | Wartburgkreis | |
| WAN | Herne City | North Rhine-Westphalia | Wanne-Eickel | |
| WAR | Höxter District | North Rhine-Westphalia | Warburg | |
| WAT | Bochum City | North Rhine-Westphalia | Wattenscheid | |
| WB | Wittenberg District | Saxony-Anhalt | Wittenberg | |
| WBS | Eichsfeld District | Thuringia | Leinefelde-Worbis | |
| WDA | Zwickau District | Saxony | Werdau | |
| WE | Weimar City | Thuringia | Weimar | |
| WEL | Limburg-Weilburg District | Hesse | Weilburg | |
| WEN | Weiden in der Oberpfalz City | Bavaria | Weiden | |
| WER | Augsburg District | Bavaria | Wertingen | [WAR-YA 1 to 999] to [WAR-YZ 1 to 999] From [WAR-A 7000 to 9999] to [WAR-Z 7000 to 9999] |
| WER | Dillingen an der Donau District | Bavaria | Wertingen | Every other available combination |
| WES | Wesel District | North Rhine-Westphalia | Wesel | |
| WF | Wolfenbüttel District | Lower Saxony | Wolfenbüttel | |
| WG | Ravensburg District | Baden-Württemberg | Wangen | |
| WHV | Wilhelmshaven City | Lower Saxony | Wilhelmshaven | |
| WI | Wiesbaden City | Hesse | Wiesbaden | (Excludes [WI-HP 100 to 9999], reserved for City Police) |
| WIL | Bernkastel-Wittlich District | Rhineland-Palatinate | Wittlich | |
| WIS | Nordwestmecklenburg District (Excluding Wismar City) | Mecklenburg-Vorpommern | Wismar | |
| WIT | Ennepe-Ruhr District | North Rhine-Westphalia | Witten | |
| WIZ | Werra-Meißner District | Hesse | Witzenhausen | |
| WK | Ostprignitz-Ruppin District | Brandenburg | Wittstock | |
| WL | Harburg District | Lower Saxony | Winsen (Luhe) | |
| WLG | Vorpommern-Greifswald District (Excluding Greifswald City) | Mecklenburg-Vorpommern | Wolgast | |
| WM | Weilheim-Schongau District | Bavaria | Weilheim | |
| WMS | Börde District | Saxony-Anhalt | Wolmirstedt | |
| WN | Rems-Murr District | Baden-Württemberg | Waiblingen | |
| WND | Sankt Wendel District | Saarland | Sankt Wendel | |
| WO | Worms City | Rhineland-Palatinate | Worms | |
| WOB | Wolfsburg City | Lower Saxony | Wolfsburg | |
| WOH | Kassel District | Hesse | Wolfhagen | |
| WOL | Freudenstadt District | Baden-Württemberg | Wolfach | From [WOL-A 9000 to 9999] to [WOL-E 9000 to 9999] |
| WOL | Ortenau District | Baden-Württemberg | Wolfach | Every other available combination |
| WOR | Munich District | Bavaria | Wolfratshausen | [WOL-F 1 to 9999] [WOL-O 1 to 9999] |
| WOR | Starnberg District | Bavaria | Wolfratshausen | [WOL-B 1 to 9999] [WOL-G 1 to 9999] |
| WOR | Bad Tölz-Wolfratshausen District | Bavaria | Wolfratshausen | Every other available combination |
| WOS | Freyung-Grafenau District | Bavaria | Wolfstein | |
| WR | Harz District | Saxony-Anhalt | Wernigerode | |
| WRN | Mecklenburgische Seenplatte District (Excluding Neubrandenburg City) | Mecklenburg-Vorpommern | Waren | |
| WS | Mühldorf am Inn District | Bavaria | Wasserburg | [WS-Q 1 to 9999] From [WS-QA 1 to 9999] to [WS-QZ 1 to 9999] |
| WS | Rosenheim District | Bavaria | Wasserburg | Every other available combination |
| WSF | Burgenland District | Saxony-Anhalt | Weissenfels | |
| WST | Ammerland District | Lower Saxony | Westerstede | |
| WSW | Görlitz District | Saxony | Weisswasser | |
| WT | Waldshut District | Baden-Württemberg | Waldshut-Tiengen | |
| WTL | Osnabrück District | Lower Saxony | Wittlage | |
| WTM | Wittmund District | Lower Saxony | Wittmund | |
| WÜ | Würzburg City | Bavaria | Würzburg | From [WÜ-AA 100 to 999] to [WÜ-ZZ 100 to 999] From [WÜ-AA 1000 to 9999] to [WÜ-ZZ 1000 to 9999] (Excludes [WÜ-PP 1 to 9999], reserved for Police) [WÜ-X 1 to 999] Where X is B, F, G, I, O, Q [WÜ-XY 1 to 99] Where either X or Y or both are: B, F, G, I, O, Q |
| WÜ | Würzburg District | Bavaria | Würzburg | From [WÜ-A 1000 to 9999] to [WÜ-Z 1000 to 9999] [WÜ-X 1 to 999] Where X isn't B, F, G, I, O, Q [WÜ-XY 1 to 99] Where neither X nor Y are: B, F, G, I, O, Q |
| WUG | Weißenburg-Gunzenhausen District | Bavaria | Weißenburg | |
| WÜM | Cham District | Bavaria | Waldmünchen (with rearranged letter order) | |
| WUN | Wunsiedel im Fichtelgebirge District | Bavaria | Wunsiedel | |
| WUR | Leipzig District | Saxony | Wurzen | |
| WW | Westerwald District | Rhineland-Palatinate | Westerwald | |
| WZ | Lahn-Dill District | Hesse | Wetzlar | |
| WZL | Börde District | Saxony-Anhalt | Wanzleben-Börde | |

Codes starting with letter X
| Code | City / rural district | State | Namesake | Notes |
|---|---|---|---|---|
| X | NATO Headquarters in Germany | | Arbitrarily chosen | [X-1000] Format |

Codes starting with letter Y
| Code | City / rural district | State | Namesake | Notes |
|---|---|---|---|---|
| Y | Bundeswehr (German Federal Military) | | Arbitrarily chosen | [Y-100 123] Format |

Codes starting with letter Z
| Code | City / rural district | State | Namesake | Notes |
|---|---|---|---|---|
| Z | Zwickau District | Saxony | Zwickau | |
| ZE | Anhalt-Bitterfeld District | Saxony-Anhalt | Zerbst | |
| ZEL | Cochem-Zell District | Rhineland-Palatinate | Zell | |
| ZI | Görlitz District | Saxony | Zittau | |
| ZIG | Schwalm-Eder District | Hesse | Ziegenhain | |
| ZP | Erzgebirge District | Saxony | Zschopau | |
| ZR | Greiz District | Thuringia | Zeulenroda-Triebes | |
| ZW | Zweibrücken City | Rhineland-Palatinate | Zweibrücken | From [ZW-A 1 to 9999] to [ZW-Z 1 to 9999] From [ZW-AA 100 to 9999] to [ZW-ZZ 100 to 9999] |
| ZW | Südwestpfalz District | Rhineland-Palatinate | Zweibrücken | From [ZW-AA 1 to 99] to [ZW-ZZ 1 to 99] |
| ZZ | Burgenland District | Saxony-Anhalt | Zeitz | |

Codes starting with Numbers, 0 to 9
| Code | | City / rural district | State | Namesake | Notes |
|---|---|---|---|---|---|
| 0 | [0-1] | Vehicle of the Federal President | | | |
| 0 | [0-2] | Vehicle of the Federal Chancellor | | | |
| 0 | [0-3] | Vehicle of the Federal Minister for Foreign Affairs | | | |
| 0 | [0-4] | Vehicle of the State Secretary of the Federal Foreign Office | | | |
| 0 | [0-## 1 to 999] [0-### 1 to 999] | Diplomatic license plate Where ## or ### is a numerical code associated with each country. | | | |
| 1 | [1-1] | Vehicle of the President of the Bundestag | | | |

=== Stickers ===
Registration plates become valid with the official seal of registration. This is a sticker of 45 mm (1 3/4 in) diameter, following the area code and bearing, in colours, the seal of the respective German Bundesland with the name of the state and the issuing district authority added in print. Older stickers were monochrome, black on silver or white, and smaller (35 mm; 1 3/8 in), depicting the seal of either the Bundesland or the city district. Vehicles used by federal institutions, such as Bundespolizei, carry the German Bundesadler instead of a Bundesland seal.

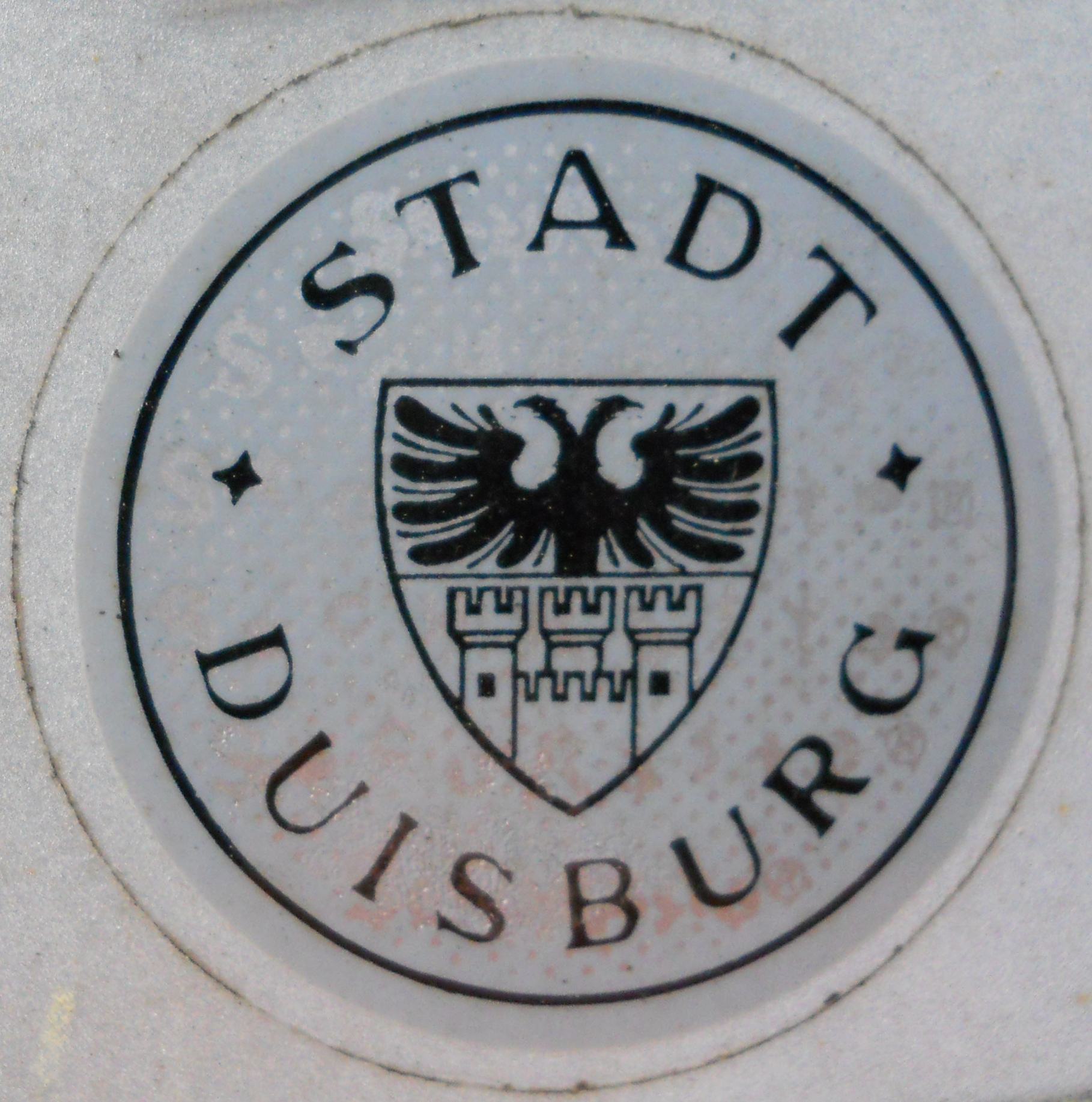
Registration seal, City of Duisburg, pre-1994 version with city arms

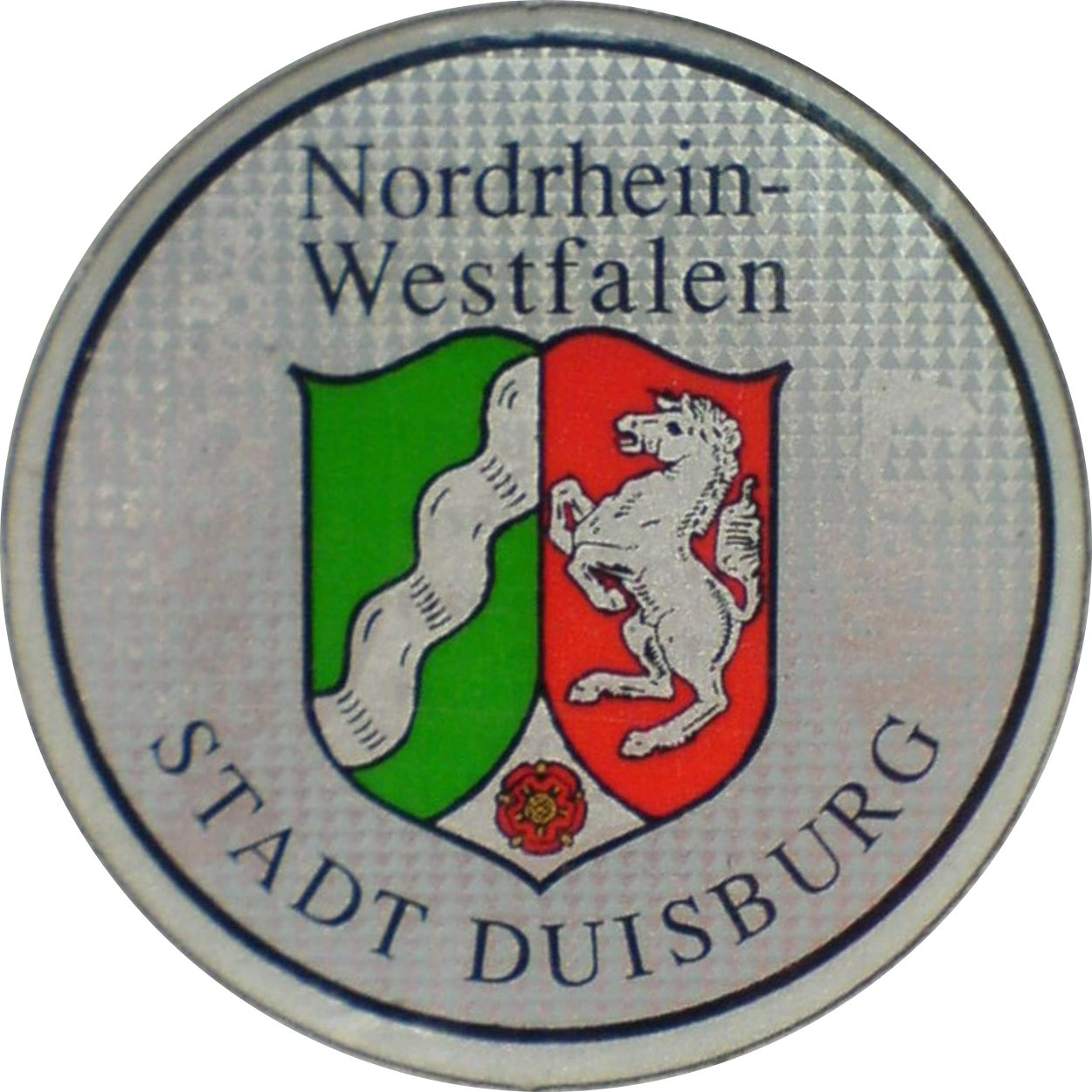
Registration seal, City of Duisburg, North Rhine-Westphalia, post-1994 version with state emblem

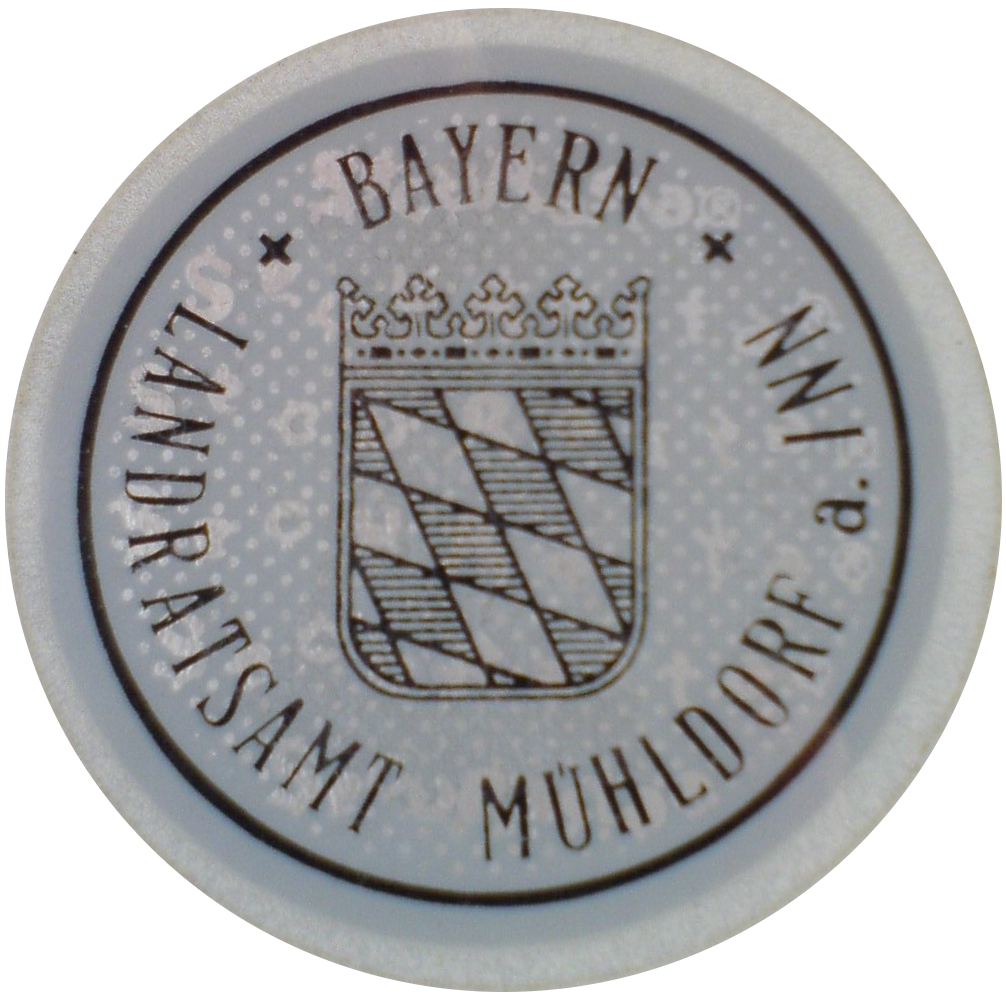
Registration seal, Mühldorf am Inn, pre-1994, Bavaria state arms monochrome

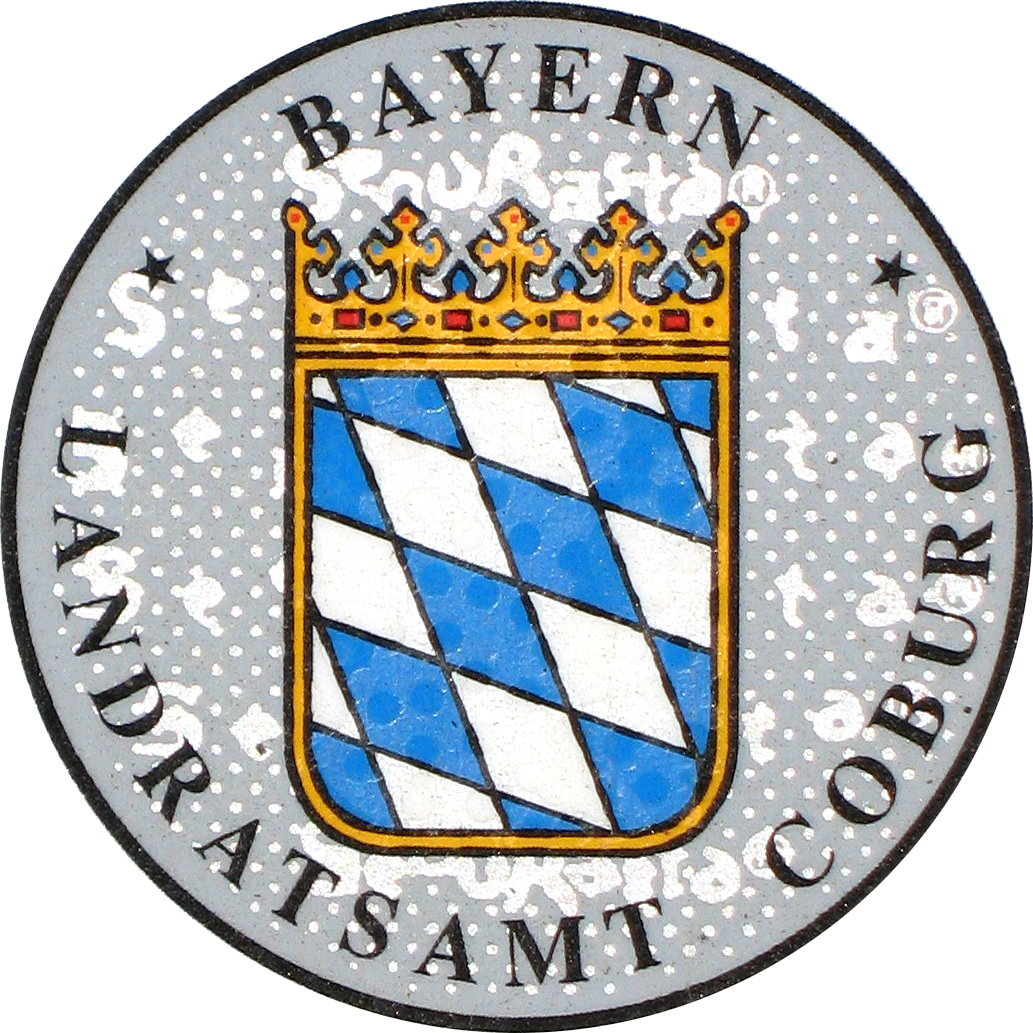
Registration seal, Coburg district, post-1994, Bavaria state arms in colours

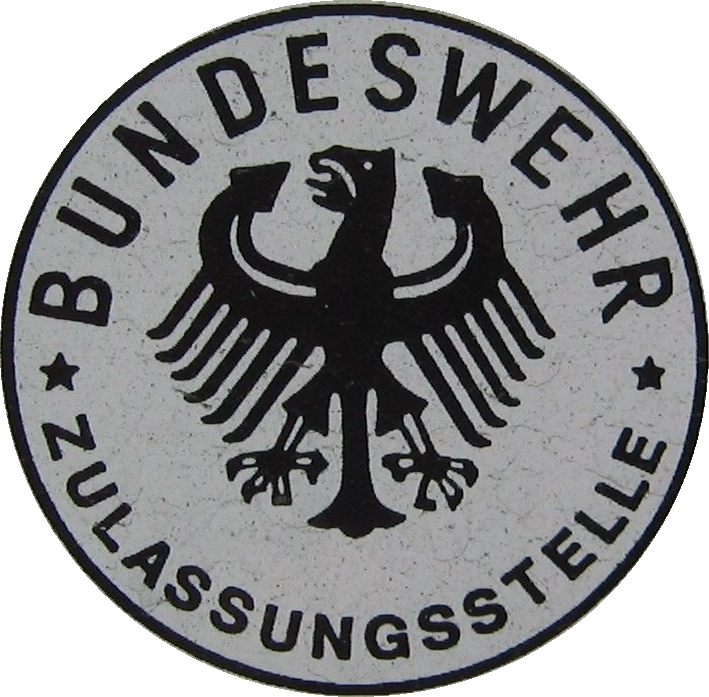
Bundeswehr registration seal with the Bundesadler

The rear plate bears, above the official seal, the vehicle safety test sticker. This test is obligatory three years after the first registration, and every two years after that. (This time scheme differs for certain vehicles, such as buses, trucks, taxis, etc.) The expiration date can be seen at one glance, as the sticker is attached with the month of expiration pointing upwards. The black mark framing the sectors on either side of 12 thus makes it easy for the police to read the expiration month from a distance. Like the hand on a clock, the marking shows the position of a number on the face of a clock. The year when the next safety test is due is printed in the centre of the sticker and also indicated by the colour of the sticker which is repeated every six years.

Whereas the technical inspection was introduced in 1951, it was not before 1961 that a decal on the rear plate indicated when it was due. The inspection generally had to be performed every two years, only later brand new cars were granted an extra year before their first technical inspection. Consequently, there were not so many different colours needed, and the pattern was different then.

Between 1985 and 2010, a similar yet hexagonal sticker was applied to the front plate, certifying the emission test which had to be performed separately since March 1985. With a change of laws effective in 2010, the emission test was incorporated into the safety test, so the emission sticker became obsolete.

Safety test sticker

Emission test sticker (1985–2010)

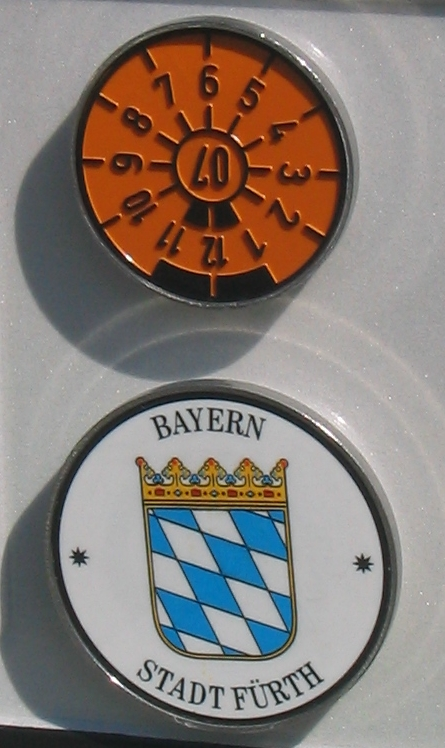
Safety test (here: valid until June 2007) and registration seal (Fürth, Bavaria)

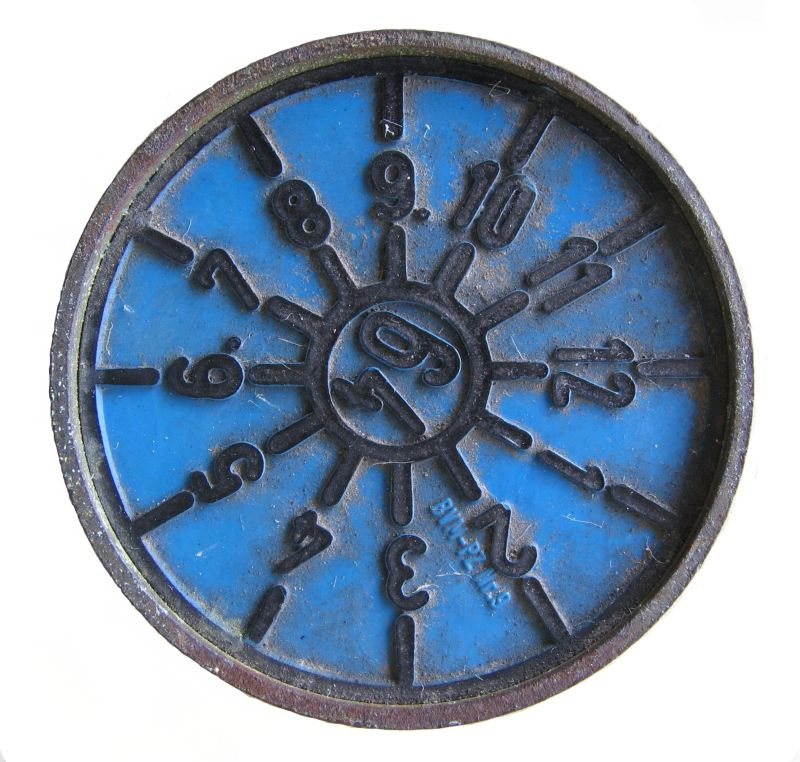
Ancient safety test marker, September 1964 (Note: Note that the numbers run in the opposite direction as now, and the black mark 11–12–1 has not yet been invented.)

Colours of the emission test (1985–2010) and vehicle safety test stickers (since 1974)
| Colour | Year | | | | | | | | | | |
|---|---|---|---|---|---|---|---|---|---|---|---|
| RAL 8004 (Kupferbraun, Copper brown) | 1974 | 1980 | 1986 | 1992 | 1998 | 2004 | 2010 | 2016 | 2022 | 2028 | 2034 |
| RAL 3015 (Hellrosa, Light pink) | 1975 | 1981 | 1987 | 1993 | 1999 | 2005 | 2011 | 2017 | 2023 | 2029 | 2035 |
| RAL 6018 (Gelbgrün, Yellow-green) | 1976 | 1982 | 1988 | 1994 | 2000 | 2006 | 2012 | 2018 | 2024 | 2030 | 2036 |
| RAL 2000 (Gelborange, Yellow-orange) | 1979 | 1983 | 1989 | 1995 | 2001 | 2007 | 2013 | 2019 | 2025 | 2031 | 2037 |
| RAL 5015 (Himmelblau, Sky blue) | 1978 | 1984 | 1990 | 1996 | 2002 | 2008 | 2014 | 2020 | 2026 | 2032 | 2038 |
| RAL 1012 (Zitronengelb, Lemon yellow) | 1977 | 1985 | 1991 | 1997 | 2003 | 2009 | 2015 | 2021 | 2027 | 2033 | 2039 |

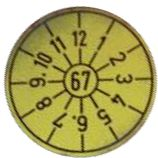
Old style safety test sticker, 1967 (Note: The point behind figures 6 and 9 was meant to avoid confusion (6. vs 9.).)

Colours of vehicle safety test stickers (1961–73)
| Colour | Year | | | |
|---|---|---|---|---|
| Weiß, White | 1961 | 1965 | 1969 | 1973 |
| Dunkeloliv, Dark Olive Green | 1962 | 1966 | 1970 | |
| Goldgelb, Golden Yellow | 1963 | 1967 | 1971 | |
| Blau, Blue | 1964 | 1968 | 1972 | |

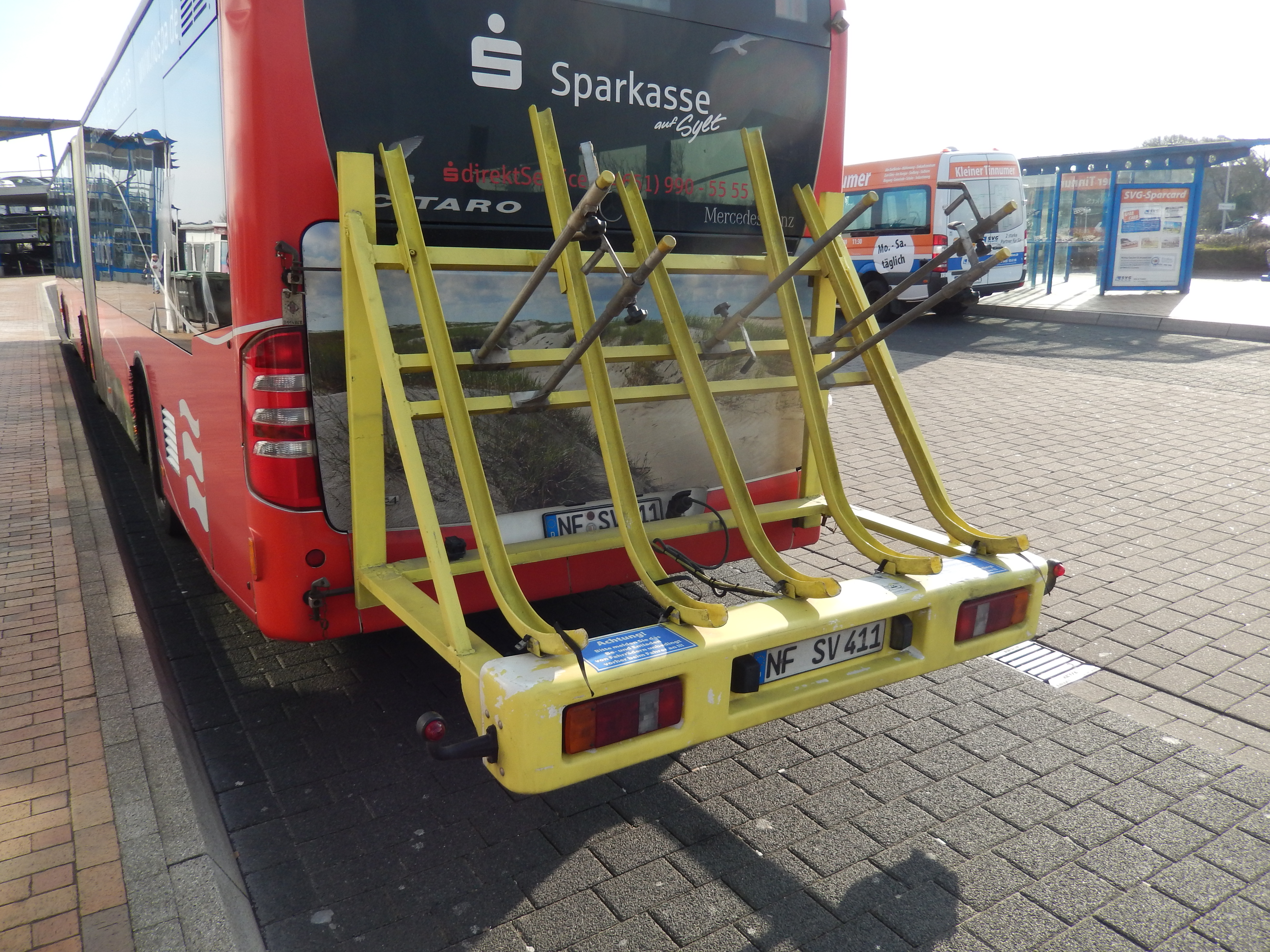
Bus with repeater plate, due to the bike carrier

All these stickers are specially treated to be easily transferred onto the licence plates, but hard to be removed without damaging the plate itself, making them relatively counterfeit-proof.

The only licence plates which do not need to carry either seal are repeaters. These are obligatory when the original rear plate is covered, in part or whole, by cargo or attached parts, such as bicycle carriers.

=== Serial letters and digits ===
The final identifier or Erkennungsnummer of the licence plate consists of one or two letters, followed by a number of up to four digits. Thus, basically any combination from A1 to ZZ9999 is possible, yet restricted by the maximum length of eight characters, including the area code. All 26 letters of the Latin alphabet may be used, yet this was not always so. In order to avoid confusion between B and 8, F and E, G and 6, I and 1, O and Q and 0, those six letters were excluded from the middle part of registration plates. In 1992, the letters B, F and G were permitted, and in 2000 the alphabet was completed as I, O and Q have been allowed. In the very first months of the numbering system, between July and November 1956, the letter I was used but J was not. This was soon reversed, but single vintage cars kept sporting their letter I between 1956 and 2000 when it was re-introduced.

Identifiers are categorized into five groups, according to the number of letters and numbers:

| Group | Letters | Numbers | From – to | Number of possible combinations |
|---|---|---|---|---|
| a | 1 | 1–3 | A1–Z999 | 26×999 = 25,974 |
| b | 2 | 1–2 | AA1–ZZ99 | 26×26×99 = 66,924 |
| c | 2 | 3 | AA100–ZZ999 | 26×26×900 = 608,400 |
| d | 1 | 4 | A1000–Z9999 | 26×9,000 = 234,000 |
| e | 2 | 4 | AA1000–ZZ9999 | 26×26×9,000 = 6,084,000 |

Not every group is issued by every authority and group e cannot be combined with three-letter area codes.

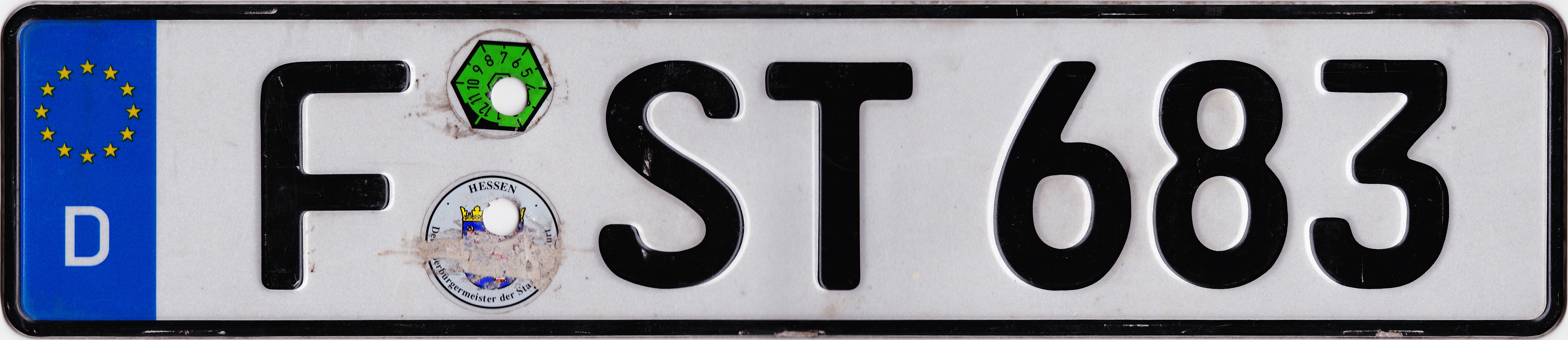
This plate from Frankfurt am Main bears the letters F ST, whereas FS T may be found on a vehicle from Freising.

In the style used until 1994, a hyphen following the area code was used to separate the two groups of letters. This no longer appears in the new format but is often retained, as the space between the geographic identifier and serial letters is a significant character and must be considered when writing down or transmitting a number. For example, F ST 683 is different from FS T 683. The risk of confusion can be avoided by writing a hyphen after the city code, like F-ST 683. For this reason, the police will usually radio the location name and spell out the next letters, using the German spelling alphabet. Thus, F ST 683 would be radioed as Frankfurt, Siegfried, Theodor, sechs-acht-drei and FS T 683 as Freising, Theodor, sechs-acht-drei. If the officer should not know the meaning of the area code, he would spell it out too, as Friedrich, Siegfried, Trennung (separation), Theodor, etc.

While the number is issued by each district authority separately, a probable split between two or more districts sharing the same area code has to be considered. (Note: In Nürnberger Land district e.g., LAU and HEB can be used in any combination, ESB with N only, PEG with A only, N with one-letter identifiers only, yet excluding the "new" letters B, F, G, I, O, Q and S.) Further restrictions are caused by "prohibited" combinations (see below). (Note: There has to exist a method to avoid two vehicles getting plate numbers only distinguished by the position of the blank space, because the Vienna Convention on Road Traffic describes some rules about international road traffic, and it does not define blank or hyphen as a significant character on plates.)

==== Personalised plates ====
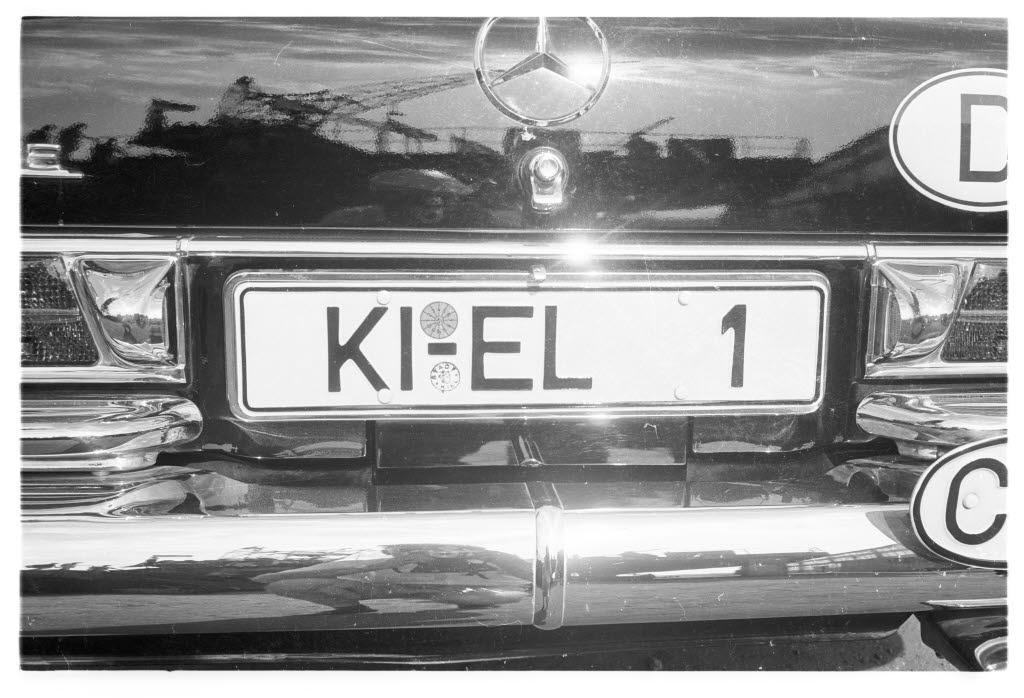
Very old example of a personalised plate, from Kiel

For an extra charge of €10.20, vehicle owners can register a personalised identifier, keeping to the above rules. In most cases of personalised plates, owners choose their initials and a number reflecting their date of birth. In this fashion, fictional Mrs Ulrike Mustermann, born 2 May 1965 and living in Essen, might choose E-UM 2565 for her car. By combining area code and random letters, further possibilities arise, such as a man from Oldenburg named Olaf, born on Christmas Eve, could choose OL-AF 2412. A resident of the town of Pirna might choose PIR-AT 77, Pirat meaning "pirate" in German. Kiel and Kleve are two examples of places where the number plate can spell out all of the city name.

These vanity plates can only be made up of the available prefixes and numbers, within the general rules. A James Bond fan from Hamburg would not be allowed the plate HH-JB 007 because leading digits 0 (or even double-0) are not possible; however, he might strive for HH-J 8007 or HH-OO 7, imitating digits by letters or vice versa. The owner of a Volkswagen Polo can certainly show VW in the middle section, but neither PO-LO 1995 nor VW-P0 L01 would be possible, as these prefixes are not issued nor may letters and digits be mixed at will. Nonetheless, a notable variety of personalised number plates can be spotted on German roads.

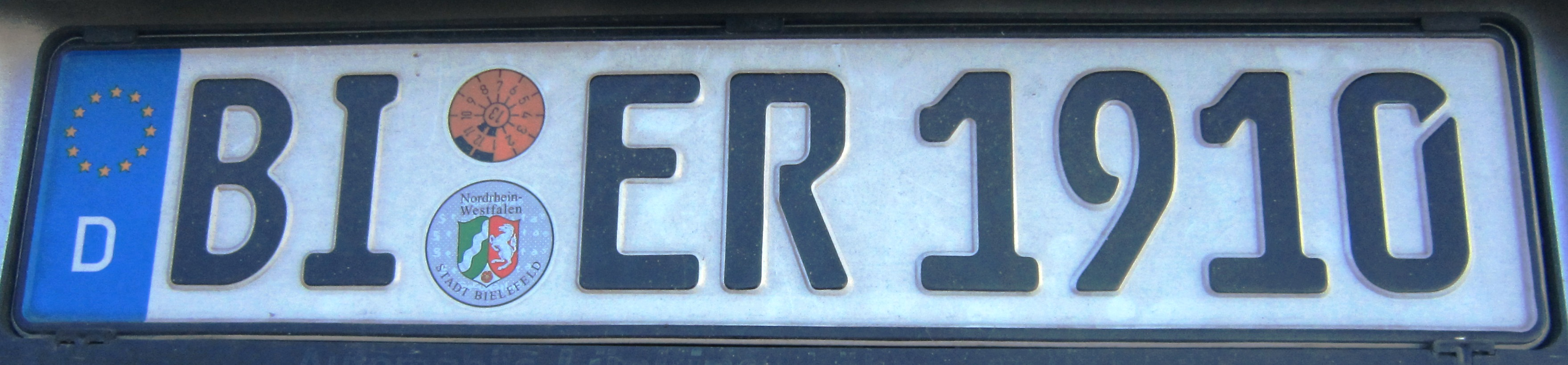
Bier means beer

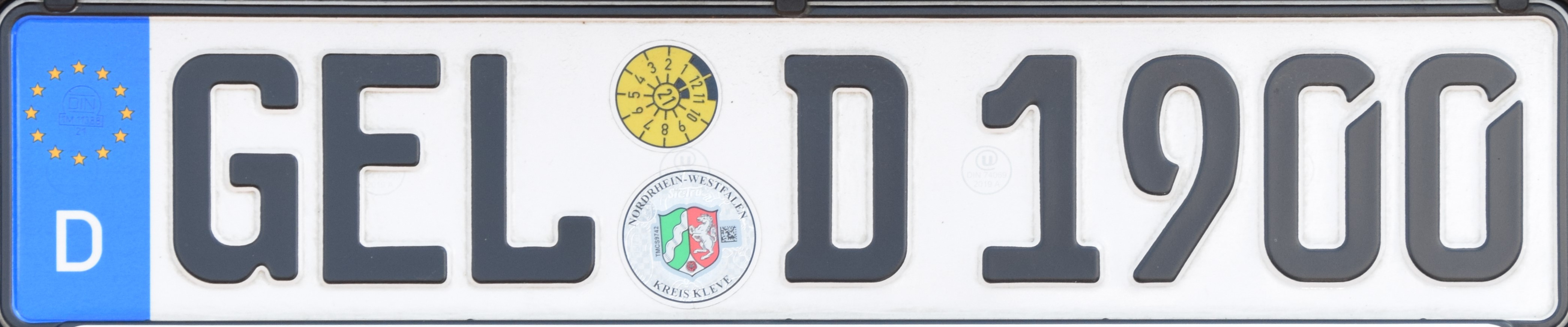
Geld means money

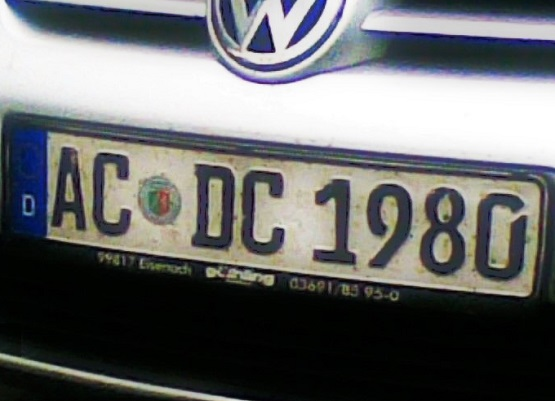
AC/DC is a rock band.

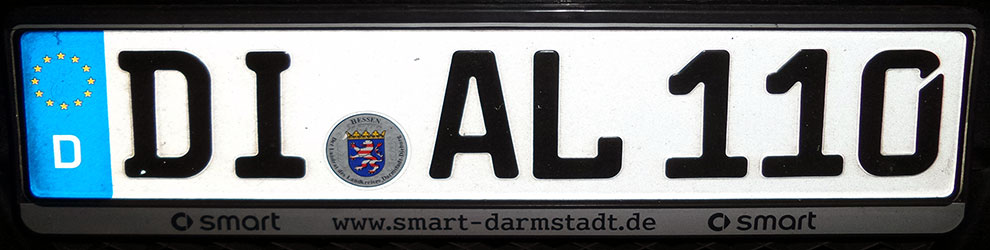
110 is the police emergency number

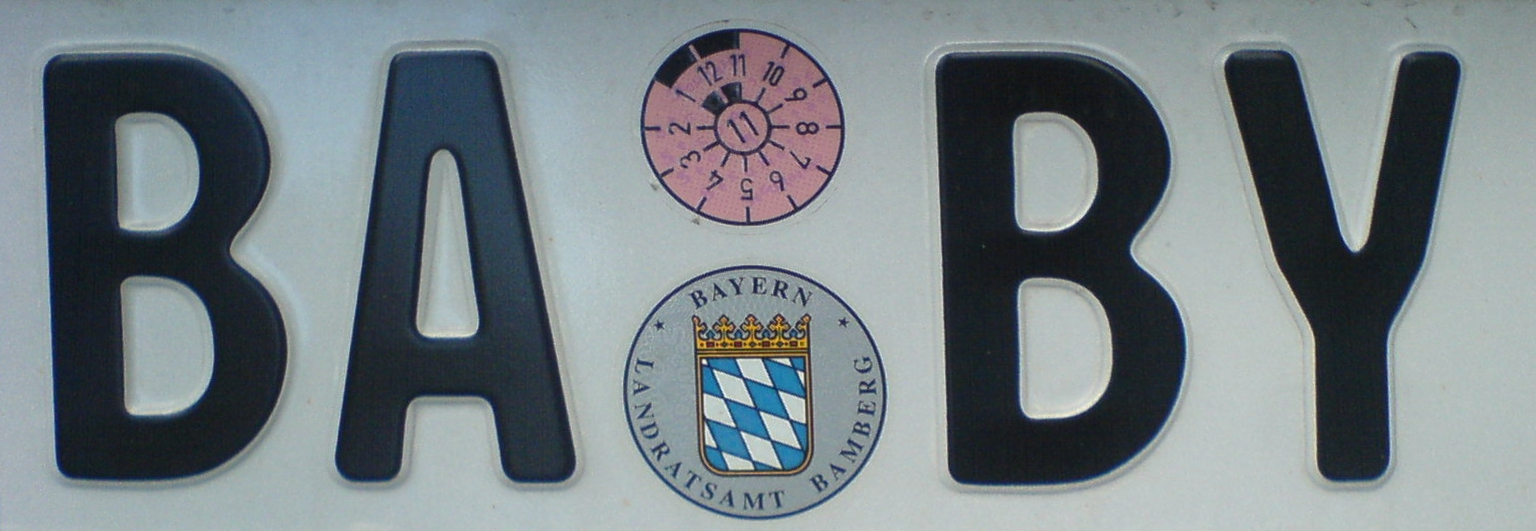

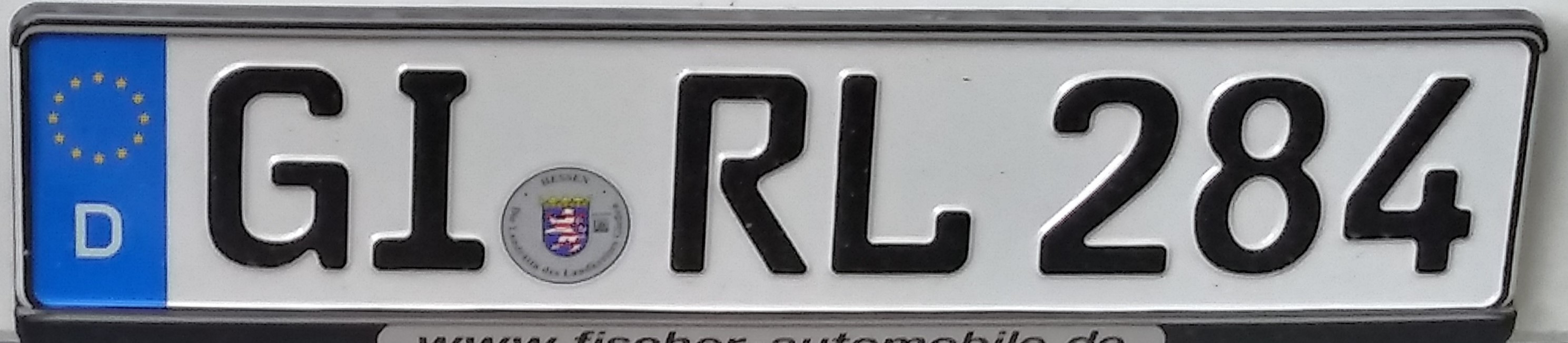

==== Company cars ====
Whereas private persons are required to register their vehicle with the district authority of their residence, commercial enterprises can choose to establish branch offices from where to register at will – either for financial reasons, as insurance fees are dependent on the address of registration, or to obtain an interesting licence plate. On the other hand, other enterprises show their origin proudly nationwide. One of these is ADAC, the German automobile association, based in Munich. All their assistance cars, operating from the Alps to the North Sea, bear an M plate.

Deutsche Bahn, after being corporatised and relinquishing their Behördenkennzeichen (authority plate) DB, prefers this logo as their middle letters, e. g. F-DB for the Frankfurt office. Deutsche Telekom, the largest telecommuncations company, often uses BN plates, as their headquarters remained in Bonn, where the company originated out of a governmental post & telephone agency. Yet wherever the respective branch office may be, the middle letters DT are preferred.

The Kone company registers their German vehicles in Koblenz, with middle letters NE, thus displaying their trademark on their plates. BMW, owner of Mini, registers all Mini press/marketing cars in the district of Minden-Lübbecke which holds the code MI, to get "MI-NI" number plates for the cars. BMW itself is based in Munich, yet M-INI plates are not possible to issue, as three letters after the district code are not permitted.

From 1970s up to 1994, Essen city buses owned by city transport company EVAG (Essener Verkehrs-AG) were registered with E-AT number plates. This may be regarded a pun, as eat translates into German as Essen.

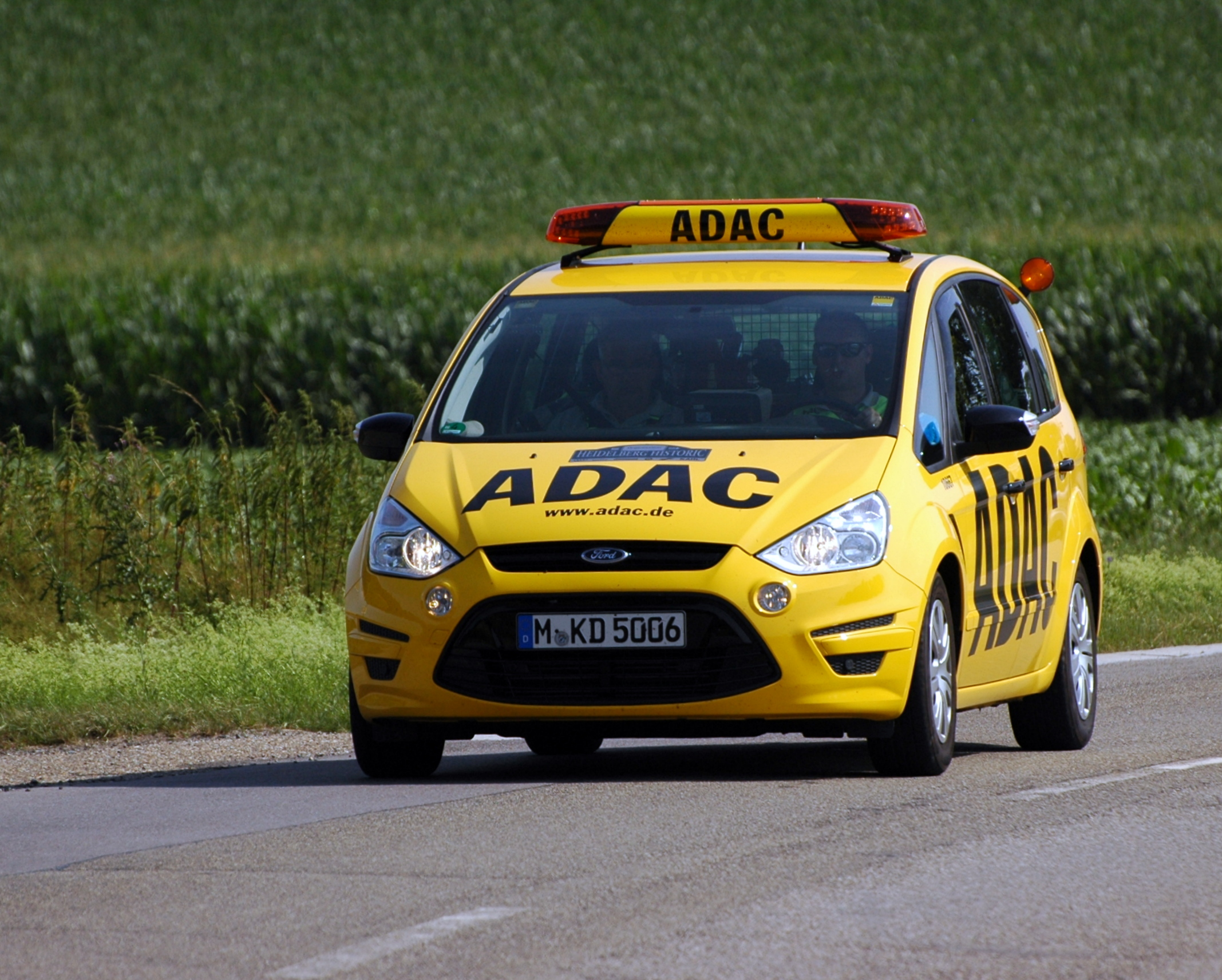
ADAC roadside assistance car

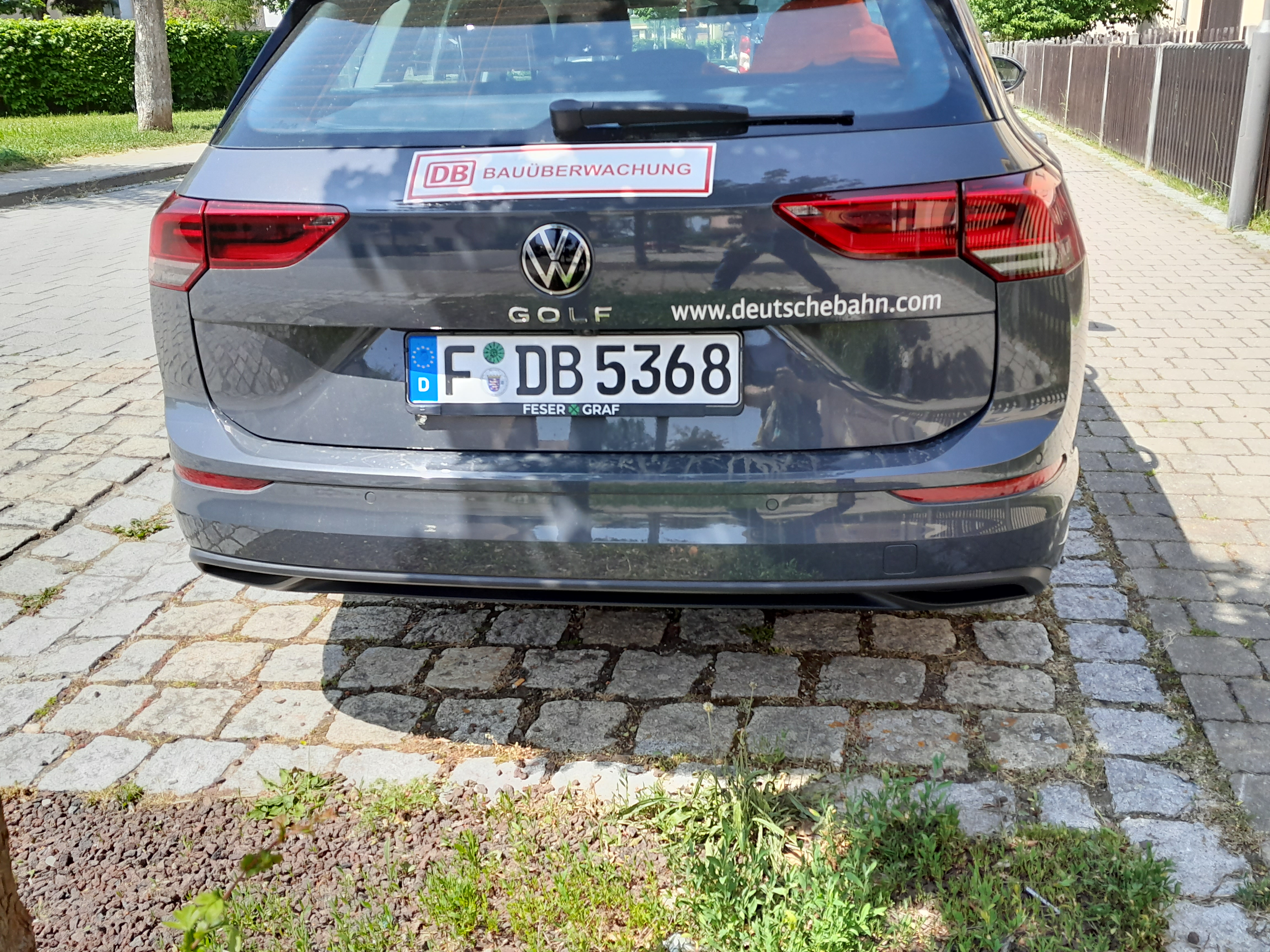
Deutsche Bahn (DB) construction supervisor

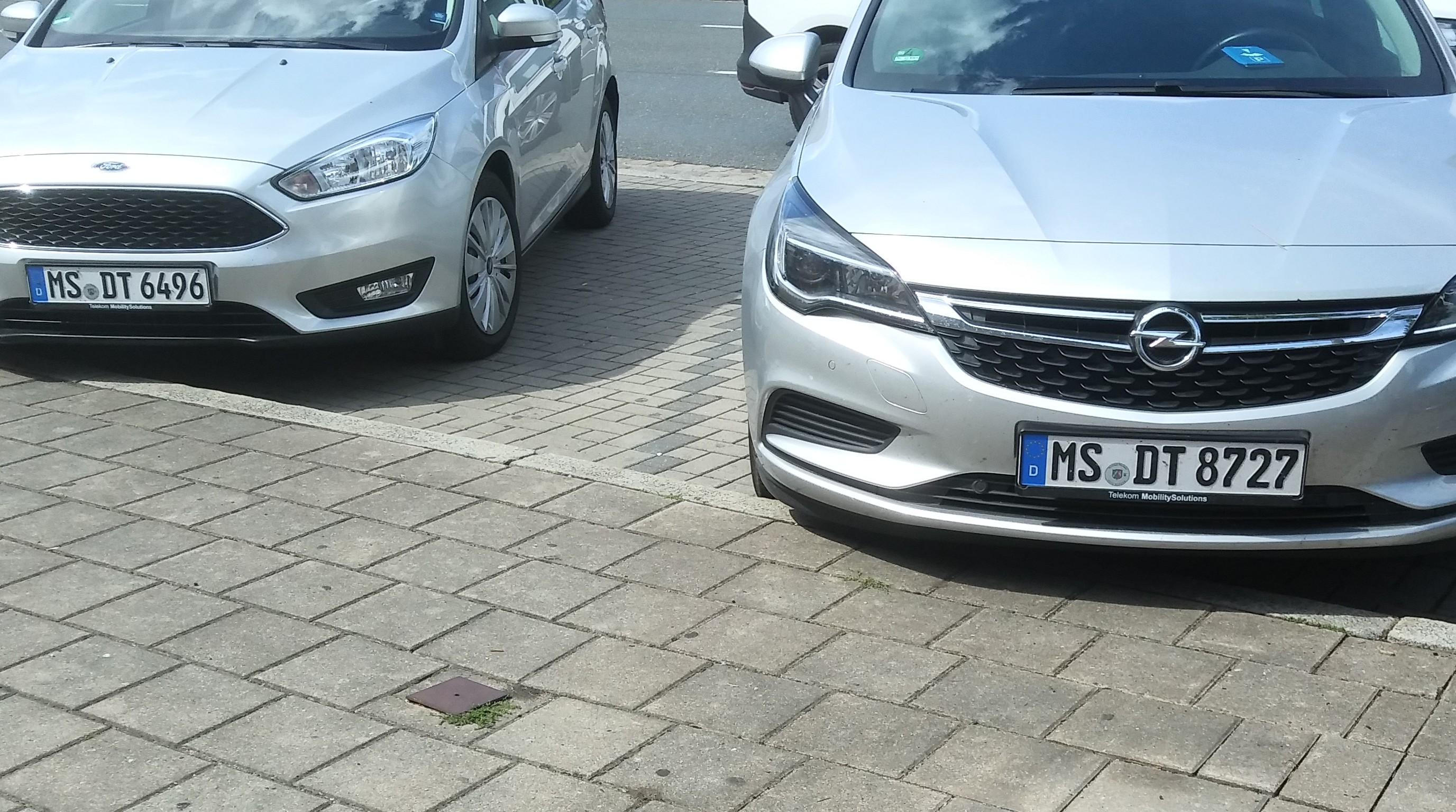
2 cars of Deutsche Telekom (DT), registered in Münster

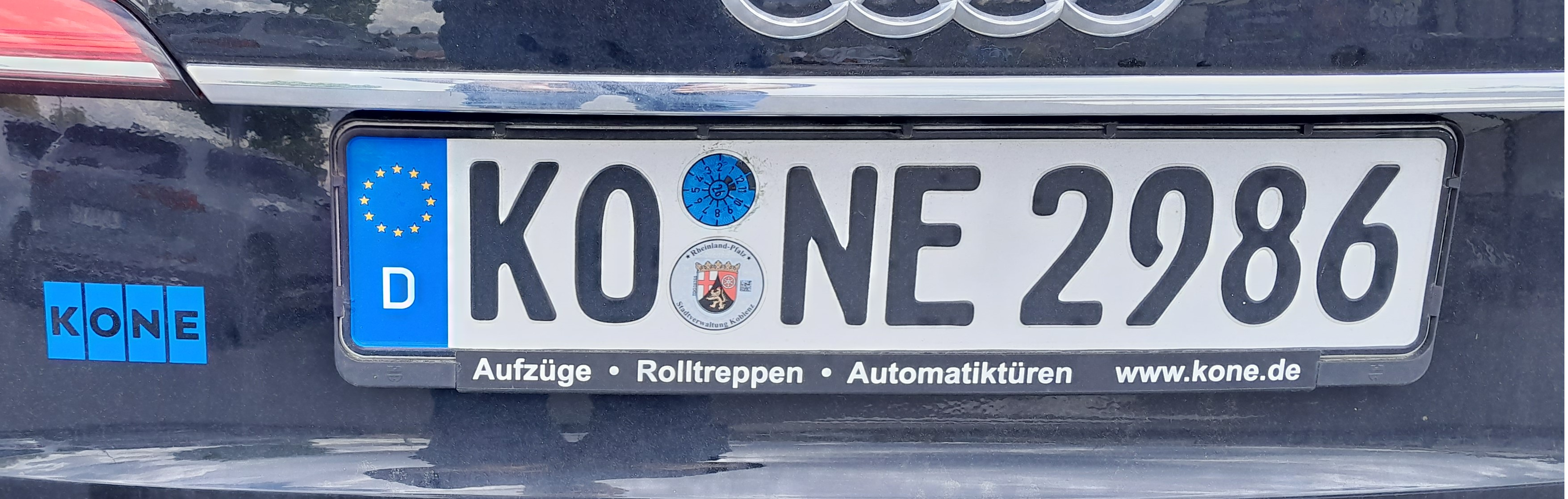
A car of Kone's, unmistakably

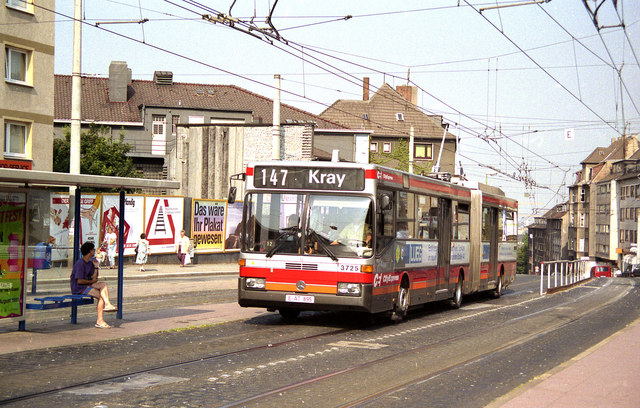
Bus E-AT 895, headed for Essen-Kray in 1991

=== Prohibited combinations ===
Combinations that are regarded as a Verstoß gegen die guten Sitten, which means "offence to moral and customs", are disallowed or otherwise avoided. This refers mostly to abbreviations relating to Nazi Germany, such as NS (National Socialism), KZ (Konzentrationslager, concentration camp), HJ (Hitlerjugend, Hitler Youth), SS (Schutzstaffel) and SA (Sturmabteilung). Therefore, these two-letter combinations are generally not issued in any district, nor do the city districts of Hanover, Nuremberg, Cologne and Stuttgart issue one-letter plates which would result in the combinations H-J, N-S, K-Z, S-A, S-D and S-S.

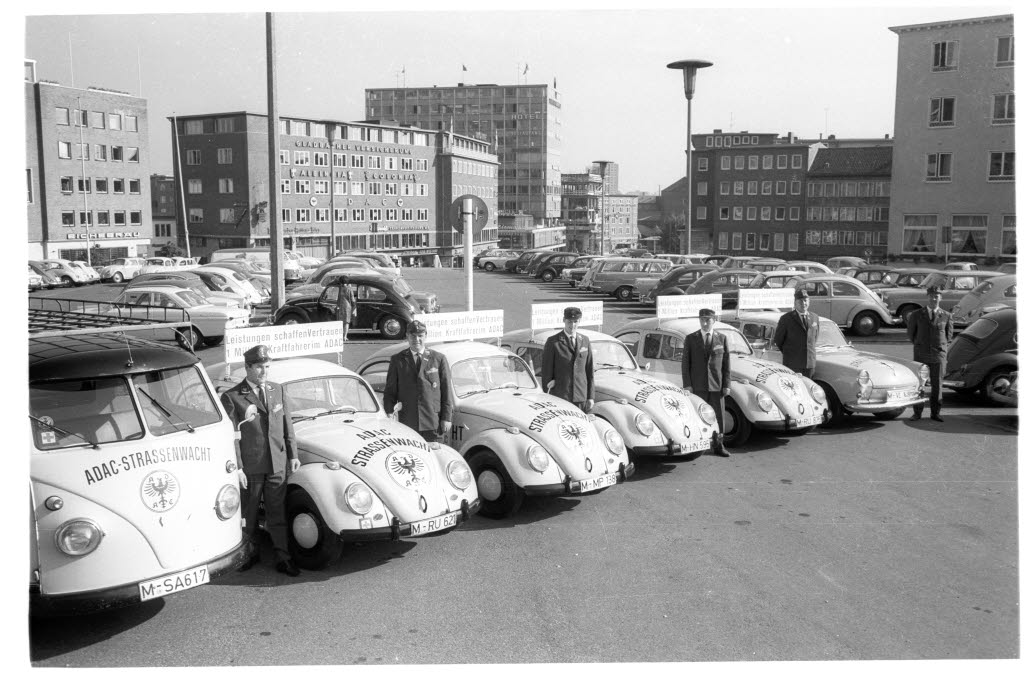
ADAC car parade in 1965 – the plate on the far left reads M-SA 617

Those prefixes must not be issued as middle letters now, yet the list of forbidden codes appears to have developed over the decades. In the 1960s, the renowned ADAC had no qualms with the middle letters SA, as seen on an archive photo. Although the "infamous" combinations were generally excluded from the list of possible area codes with the introduction of the current system, the French occupation force had between 1945 and 1949 used the combination SA followed by the double-digit numbers 01 to 08 for the then seven rural districts in the Saar Protectorate and its capital Saarbrücken. By 1990, however, codes like these were not taken into consideration for newly formed districts in former GDR: The district Sächsische Schweiz used the name of its capital, Pirna, in its code PIR, to avoid the use of SS. When the districts of Torgau, Delitzsch and Oschatz merged into Nordsachsen, they combined their initials into TDO, instead of abbreviating Northern Saxony as NS. (Note: TOD would have seemed indecent too, as it means death.)

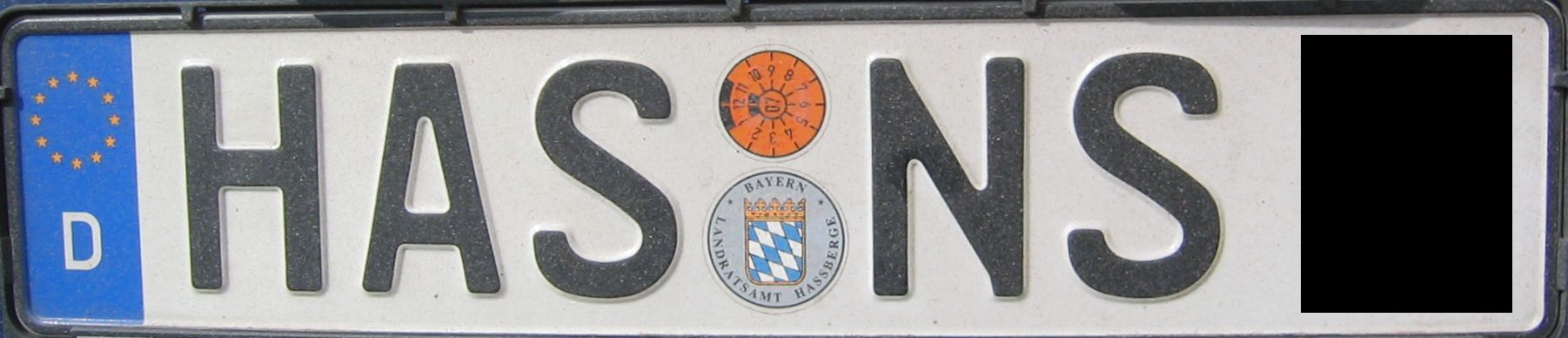
Example of banned combination (NS) which was issued accidentally

On the other hand, the area codes HH and AH were chosen for Hansestadt Hamburg and former district Ahaus, although they could be interpreted as Heil Hitler and Adolf Hitler, respectively. In everyday German, the letters AH are not regarded as an obvious abbreviation for that name, (Note: AH would rather be regarded as an abbreviation for Altenheim (old people's home) or Autohaus (car dealership); cf. German Wikipedia.) even less so in the 1950s when the lists were created. (Note: It was certainly not common to refer to the Nazi "Führer" by his initials, neither before nor after 1945.) Nonetheless, these two-letter codes and the respective numerals 18 and 88, signifying the first and eighth letter of the alphabet, obviously have developed into Nazi symbols. They are therefore generally avoided in the serial part of licence plates, although they may be found sometimes. Generally, the decision whether or not a certain combination is permitted lies with the respective district authority. In Brandenburg, any plates that are related to Hitler, the Hitler salute, etc. cannot be issued, especially if they would be bearing digits 1888, 8818, 8888 or ending in 88, 888, 188. Nor can the combinations AH 18 and HH 18 be issued to new owners. Some districts however allow these combinations if they are the owner's initials (for example, Norbert Schmidt might be able to get XX-NS 1234).

In 2004 in Nuremberg, a car owner was refused a number plate beginning N-PD because of the connection to the political party NPD. After the terror group National Socialist Underground was uncovered in 2011, the city of Nuremberg refused number plates beginning with N-SU and even abolished the respective plates on their own vehicles of Stadtentwässerung und Umweltanalytik (sewage and environmental department). In the 2010s, some districts started banning licence plates with the middle letters IS which resembled the Islamic State. The Herford district registration office ceased issuing registration plates with the combination HF-Z in April 2022 to avoid connotations with the use of the letter "Z" as a symbol for the 2022 Russian invasion of Ukraine.

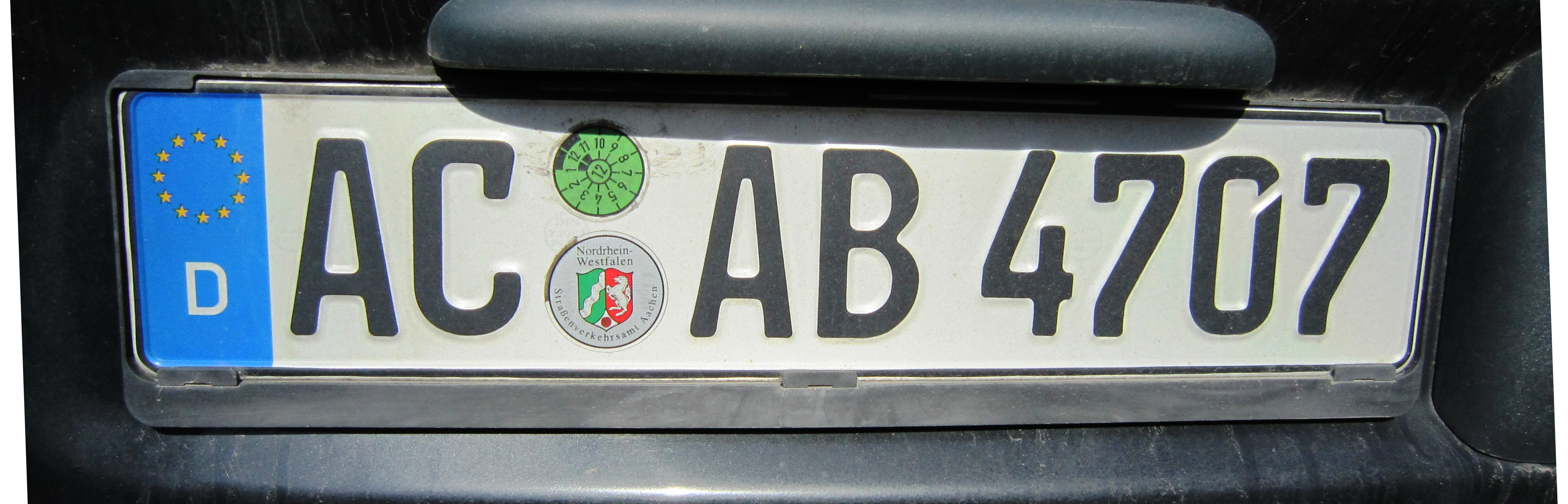
Permitted: AC-AB

The combinations STA-SI, S-ED/SE-D, HE-IL/HEI-L, IZ-AN and WAF-FE are also forbidden or discouraged, to avoid association with Stasi, the Sozialistische Einheitspartei of the GDR, the Nazi salute, NAZI backwards and the German word for weapon respectively. Other combinations affected are BUL-LE (German derogative for police, roughly comparable to pig), MO-RD (German word for murder), TO-D (German word for death), KI-LL (kill) and SU-FF (boozing).

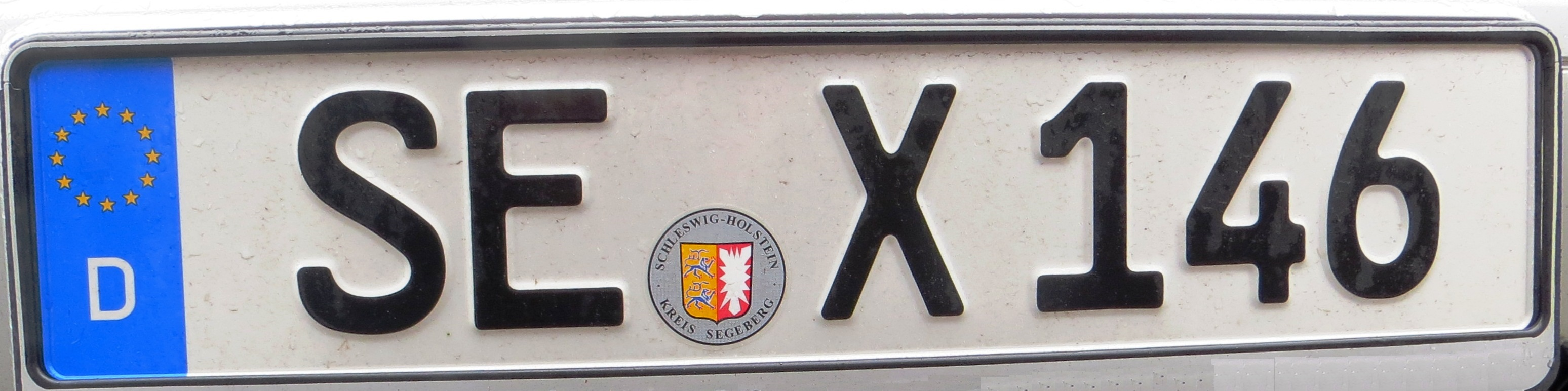
Consensual: SE-X

On the other hand, plates that would seem offensive in other circumstances have been allowed, such as the infamous acronym AC-AB. Since the 1950s, morals and customs have certainly changed, and combinations which may have appeared indecent then do not raise an eyebrow now. Therefore, it is not a problem to get a licence plate with S-EX, SE-X or SE-XY, for example.

=== Reserved combinations ===
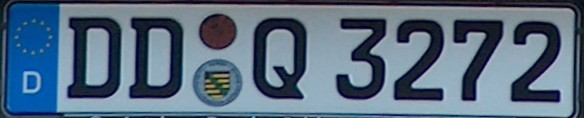
Licence plate of a police car in Saxony

For quite different reasons, some districts hold certain letter combinations reserved. The Saxon capital Dresden issues all DD-Q plates to the state police vehicles. Likewise, Erfurt uses EF-LP for the police in Thuringia. Munich and other Bavarian cities reserve certain combinations with P for the police units within their authorities, such as M-PM, N-PP or RO-P. Cologne issues K-TX to taxis and K-LN to the city's own vehicles. In various districts, firefighter vehicles will be issued the middle letters FW standing for Feuerwehr. The combinations B-FA and BN-AA with any 4-digit numbers are issued by Berlin and Bonn, respectively, to embassy domestic staff without diplomatic status.

=== Fictitious licence plates ===
An example of a fake number plate, seemingly from Munich but obviously not correct, due to the umlaut and the leading digit 0

Sometimes, such as in films or television series, it may be necessary to show licence plates which do not really belong to any vehicle. The easiest way would be to create a fictional area code, such as NN-XY 555. In the 1980s TV series Der Fahnder, the area code G was used for a fictional "large city" (German: Großstadt) in the Ruhrgebiet area. However, if the plot is supposed to take place in a defined town or region, the audience would expect cars to show codes of that area on their number plates. When James Bond was driving through Hamburg in Tomorrow Never Dies, the obviously fake Berlin licence plates on his BMW were soon pointed out.

Prior to 2000, it was also possible to use number plates with bogus identifiers containing the letters B, F, G, I, O and Q, which at that time were not issued in the middle group. However, any of these letters can appear on a real licence plate. In order to demonstrate clearly that the plate shown is a fictitious one, the crew could use an impossible identifier, such as an umlaut in this middle section.

== Registration ==
=== Procedures ===
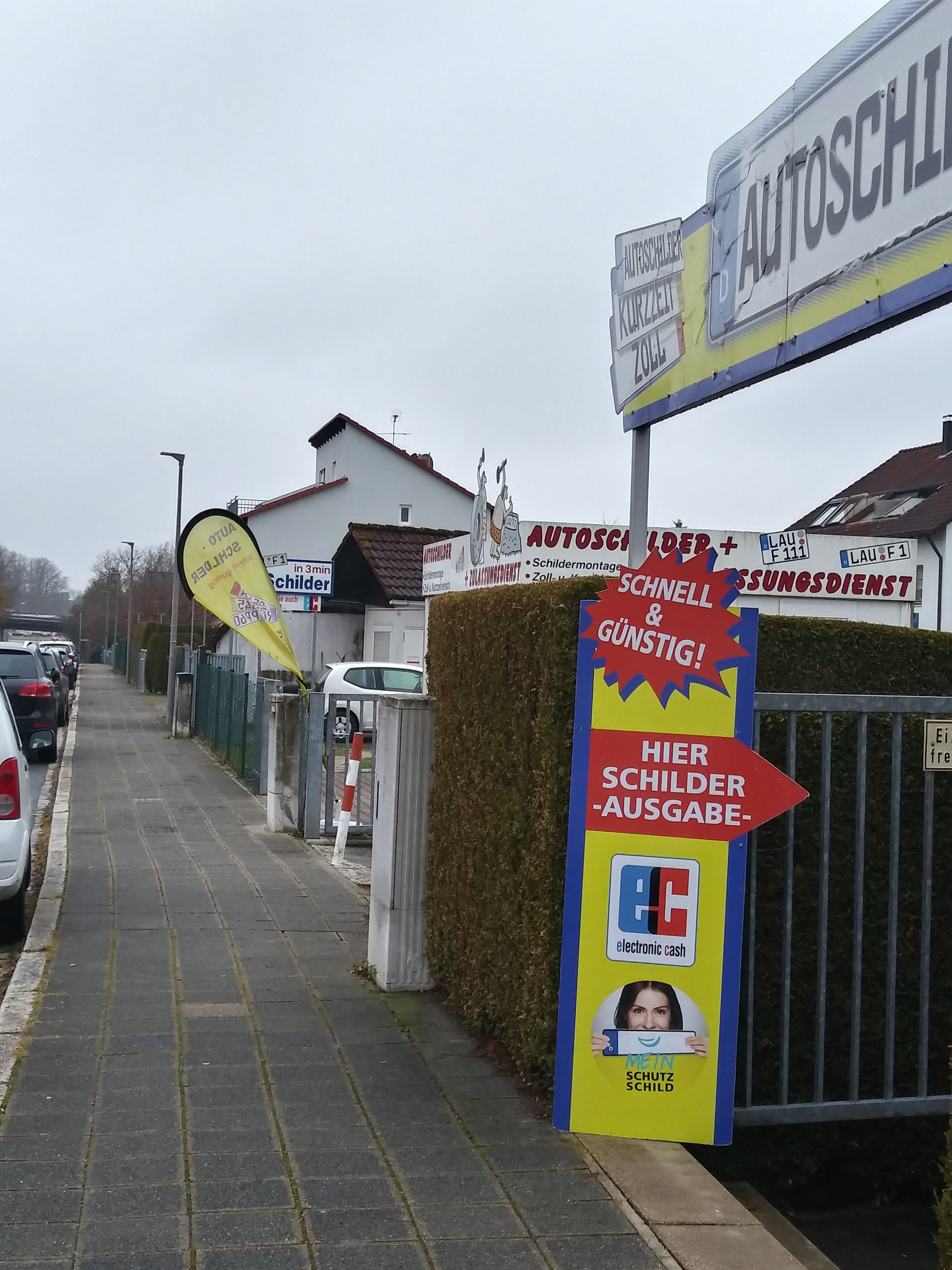
Several shops advertising Schilder (plates), in the street of the registration authority

Vehicles must be registered with their owner's name and current address. On proof of identity, vehicle documentation and liability insurance, the registration will take place in the district authority competent for the respective address. An alphanumeric combination, which can be reserved according to personal wishes, will be issued to the vehicle. The physical plates, however, have to be acquired separately, either at a local store or online. Both the dimensions of the plates and the typeface of letters and numbers are standardized. After purchasing the number plate, the official stamps must be applied, back at the registration office. A fee is payable for the registration, in addition to the expenses for the plates.

Any registration or change of it will be registered both within the district authority and nationwide. The latter task is carried out by the Central Vehicle Register (Zentrales Fahrzeugregister, ZFZR) which is controlled by the Federal Motor Transport Authority (Kraftfahrt-Bundesamt, KBA). The data which are stored there refer to the vehicle, the owner and the insurance. Inquiries from foreign authorities can be addressed to ZFZR which will then direct them to the correct district.

Changes, such as a vehicle being sold or its owner moving residence, must be registered to keep the vehicle documentation up to date. If the vehicle remains within the district, the licence plates may be retained. A vehicle being relocated outside of the district has to be registered at the authority now competent. Whilst it was mandatory to have the plates altered, according to the current address, this obligation was reduced in 2015 and has meanwhile been abolished. Since then, it is generally not possible any more to tell the owner's district of residence from the area code on the plates, as they may have registered it at a former residence e.g. in Hamburg yet moved to Frankfurt meanwhile.

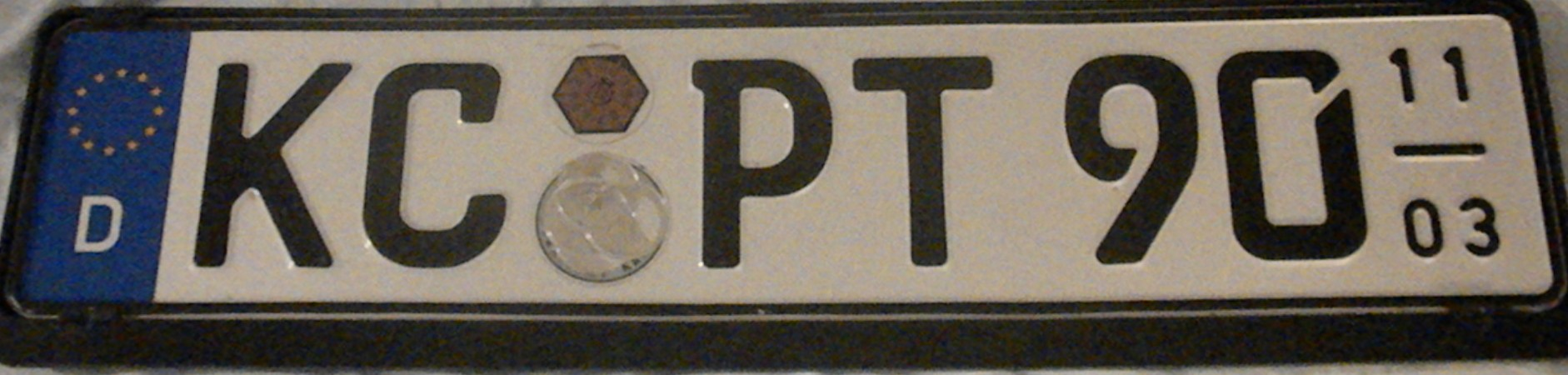
Example of a defaced plate – notice how the bottom seal is completely gone, due to scraping. (from Kronach).

When owners choose to deregister their vehicle, the officer at the local authority will want to see the licence plates with defaced seals on them as proof that the plate can no longer be used in public. For this purpose, scratching tools are available for use at the registration office. Once defaced, the plates may only be used legally on public roads for one return journey to the owner's residence. If a vehicle is to be deregistered and a new one registered to the same owner, it is possible to swap the licence plate from old to new within the same process. Documentation and fees are necessary nonetheless, and neither vehicle should be used to reach the authority, as the assignment of the number changes by the minute.

It is general practice for owners to deregister their vehicles when selling them, typically when a sale is agreed. A sales contract is highly recommended, and various forms are available online for free. A seller may hand over their vehicle with valid licence plates and papers still in their name to the new owner, and the owner will complete the registration transfer to their name. In a scenario without a proper sales contract, the seller may become liable when the buyer commits traffic violations or even criminal acts related to the car or plates. It is generally not recommended to sell used cars with licence plates.

A car whose owner has not paid their insurance premium and is reported to the police by the insurance company may get entstempelt, unstamped when found in a public place. The police will remove the official seal using a scratching tool like a screwdriver, leaving the plate without a valid seal. This renders the vehicle illegal to be used, or to be left in a public place, unless the insurance premium is paid and plates are fitted with a new official seal. A one-time journey to the relevant registration authorities is permitted to have the seal reinstated, once insurance is restored.

=== Costs ===
As of 2020, the average registration fee is €26.00 whilst further fees may apply for choosing an individual identifier or for reservation of such. Whereas some of these amounts are ordained by federal laws, others vary slightly from one district to the next. The prices for number plates, on the other hand, are subject to the free market and range from less than €10 up to around €40 per piece. Generally, it is cheaper to have the plates ordered online, but faster to walk across the street and have them made on the spot.

Further costs arise for motor vehicle tax (€194 on average yet very much depending on engine and emissions) and mandatory liability insurance (€260 on average, in 2019; depending on the model of the vehicle, age and residence of the owner, etc.). Comprehensive insurance is recommended but voluntary.

=== Special types of registration ===
Besides the most common way of registering a vehicle for everyday, all-year use indefinitely, it is possible to register for several months of each year, or for a few days in order to export the vehicle abroad. As well it is allowed, under certain restrictions, to register two vehicles (such as a car and a motorhome) under one number, with the same main licence plate. These variations may save expenses in tax and insurance. Further ways of saving apply to vintage cars and to electrically powered vehicles. Each of these special registrations are represented in the respective licence plate.

== Special codes, colours and formats ==
Certain types of vehicle bear special codes. (Note: Appendix 3 defines the unique prefixes for vehicles of federal and state government bodies, agencies, police, the armed forces, diplomatic missions and privileged international organizations.)

=== Different codes ===
In deviating from the system described above, vehicles registered to federal, state or communal owners can bear licence plates not showing the district and sometimes omitting the middle letters.

==== Highest state offices ====
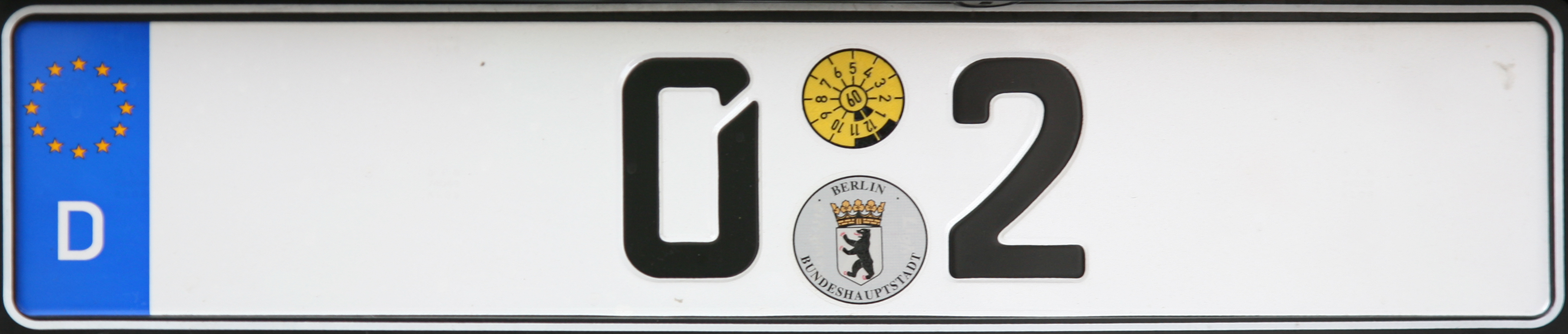
Plate of the German Chancellor

The President uses the licence plate 0-1, the Chancellor uses 0-2, the Foreign Minister uses 0-3 and the First State Secretary of the Foreign Office (i.e. the deputy Foreign Minister) uses 0-4. The President of the Parliament uses 1-1. This reflects the fact that the Parliament's president is not part of the executive branch but still ranks higher in (symbolic) importance than the Chancellor. These vehicles are tax-exempt and need not to be insured since the German government acts as insurer.

==== Federal government ====
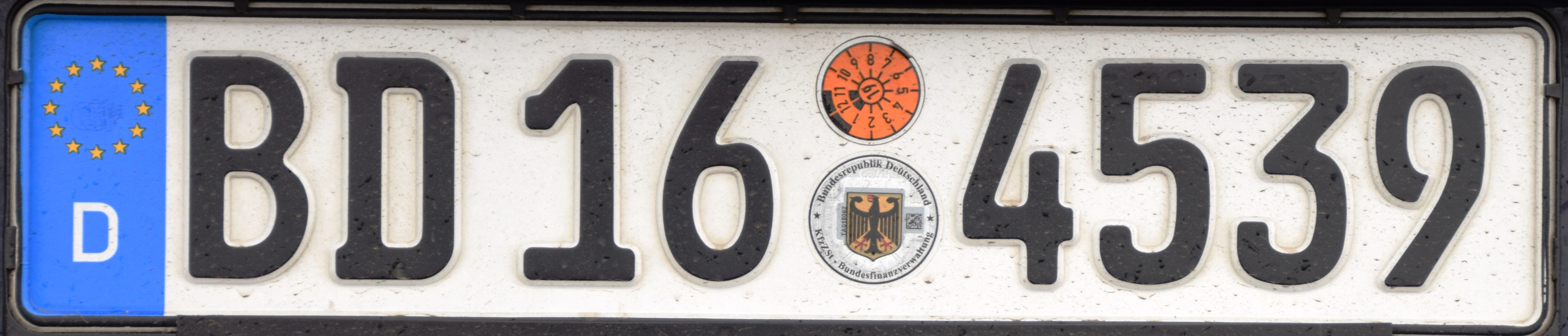
Bundesfinanzverwaltung (customs)

Instead of a city code (which would mostly mean B for Berlin) the federal government uses an exclusive abbreviation of their own. The code BD (Bundesrepublik Deutschland) applies to the federal government, ministries, parliament, presidential office, etc. which are identified by their initial number.

List
| Code | Name (German) | Name/Translation (English) |
|---|---|---|
| BD 1 | Bundestag | Bundestag |
| BD 2 | (Reserve) | |
| BD 3 | Bundesrat | Bundesrat |
| BD 4 | Bundesverfassungsgericht | Federal Constitutional Court |
| BD 5 | Bundespräsidialamt | Federal Presidential Office |
| BD 6 | Bundeskanzleramt | Federal Chancellery |
| BD 6 | Presse- und Informationsamt der Bundesregierung | Press and information office of the government |
| BD 7 | Auswärtiges Amt | Federal Foreign Office |
| BD 8 | Bundeszollverwaltung | Federal Customs Administration |
| BD 9 | Bundesministerium des Innern | Federal Ministry of the Interior |
| BD 10 | Bundesministerium der Justiz und für Verbraucherschutz | Federal Ministry of Justice and Consumer Protection |
| BD 11 | Bundesministerium der Finanzen | Federal Ministry of Finance |
| BD 12 | Bundesministerium für Wirtschaft und Energie | Federal Ministry for Economic Affairs and Energy |
| BD 13 | Bundesministerium für Verkehr | Federal Ministry for Transport |
| BD 14 | Bundesministerium für Landwirtschaft, Ernährung und Heimat | Federal Ministry of Agriculture, Food and Regional Identity |
| BD 15 | Bundesministerium für Arbeit und Soziales | Federal Ministry of Labour and Social Affairs |
| BD 16 | Bundeszollverwaltung | Federal Customs Administration |
| BD 17 | (Reserve) | |
| BD 18 | Bundesministerium der Verteidigung | Federal Ministry of Defence |
| BD 19 | Bundesministerium für Forschung, Technologie und Raumfahrt | Federal Ministry of Research, Technology and Space |
| BD 20 | Bundesministerium für Umwelt, Klimaschutz, Naturschutz und nukleare Sicherheit | Federal Ministry for the Environment, Climate Action, Nature Conservation and Nuclear Safety |
| BD 21 | Bundesministerium für Bildung, Familie, Senioren, Frauen und Jugend | Federal Ministry of Education, Family Affairs, Senior Citizens, Women and Youth |
| BD 22 | Bundesministerium für Gesundheit | Federal Ministry of Health |
| BD 23 | Bundeskriminalamt | Federal Criminal Police Office |
| BD 24 | (Reserve) | |
| BD 25 | (Reserve) | |
| BD 26 | Bundesministerium für wirtschaftliche Zusammenarbeit und Entwicklung | Federal Ministry for Economic Cooperation and Development |

==== Federal administration ====
Some branches and institutions of the federal government use their special prefix (often an abbreviation of their name) instead of a city code.

- The Technisches Hilfswerk (German Federal Agency for Technical Relief) uses its abbreviation THW, so the plates read THW-80000, for example. All numbers on THW plates start either with the digit 8 or 9.
- The Wasserstraßen- und Schifffahrtsverwaltung des Bundes (Federal Administration of Waterways and Navigation) uses BW followed by a digit identifying the region of the office (from 1=north to 7=south).
- Before the Deutsche Bundesbahn (German Federal Railways) was corporatised and the Deutsche Bundespost (German Federal Mail) was privatised, they used the abbreviations DB and BP (e.g. DB-12345, BP-12345).
- The federal police uses the code BP for Bundespolizei instead of a local code. Before 2006 the code BG, for their former name Bundesgrenzschutz, was used in the scheme BG-12345. This old code still remains valid, but any new vehicles will get the new code BP.
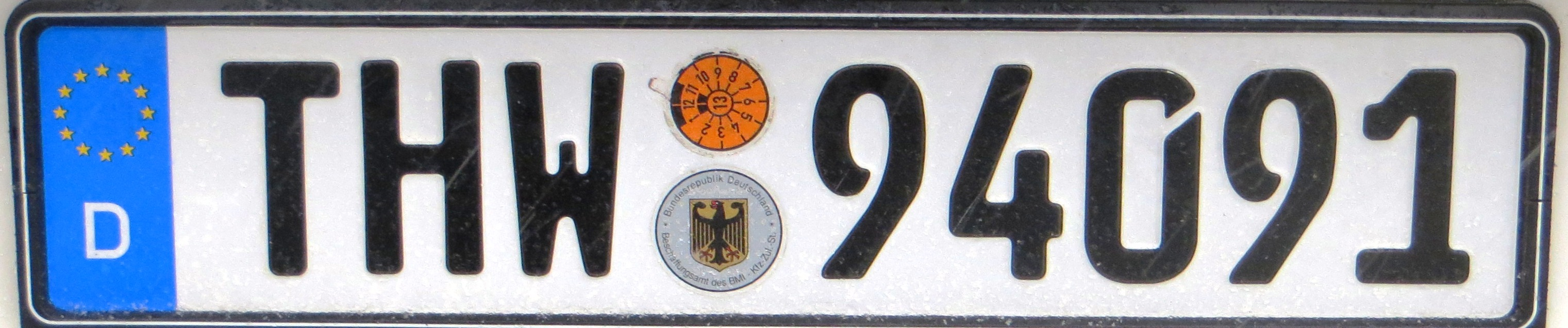
Official registered vehicle for Technisches Hilfswerk (German Federal Agency for Technical Relief)

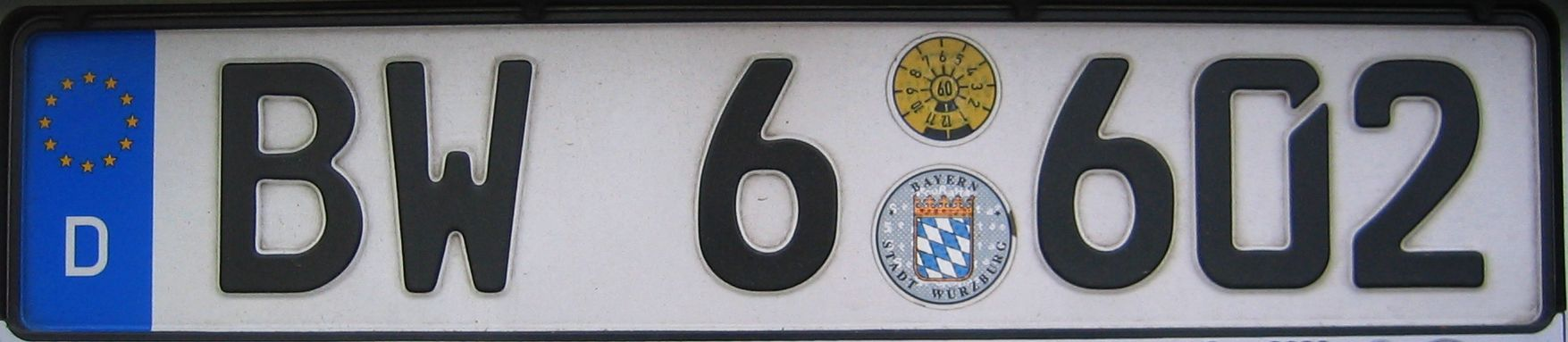
Wasser- und Schifffahrtsverwaltung des Bundes, here: South Office in Würzburg

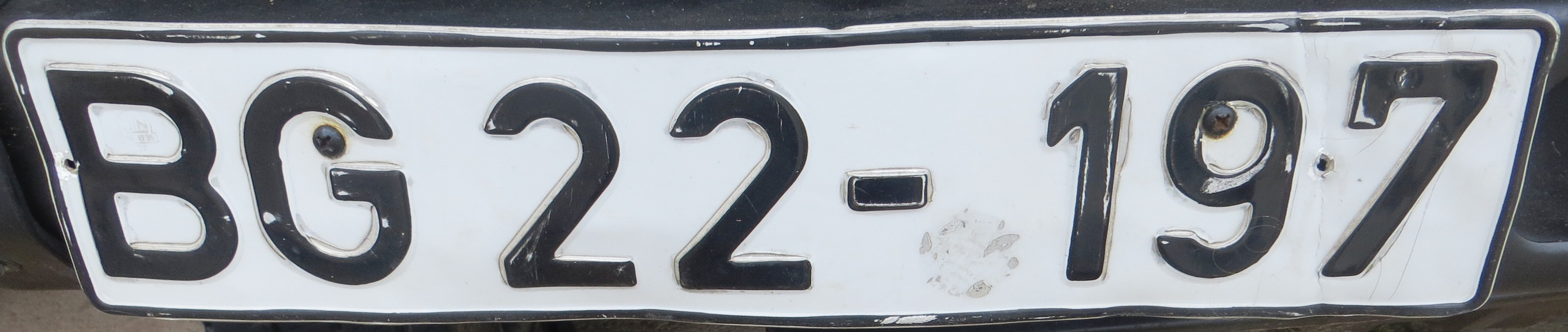
Bundesgrenzschutz licence plate, old-style code BG, no longer issued

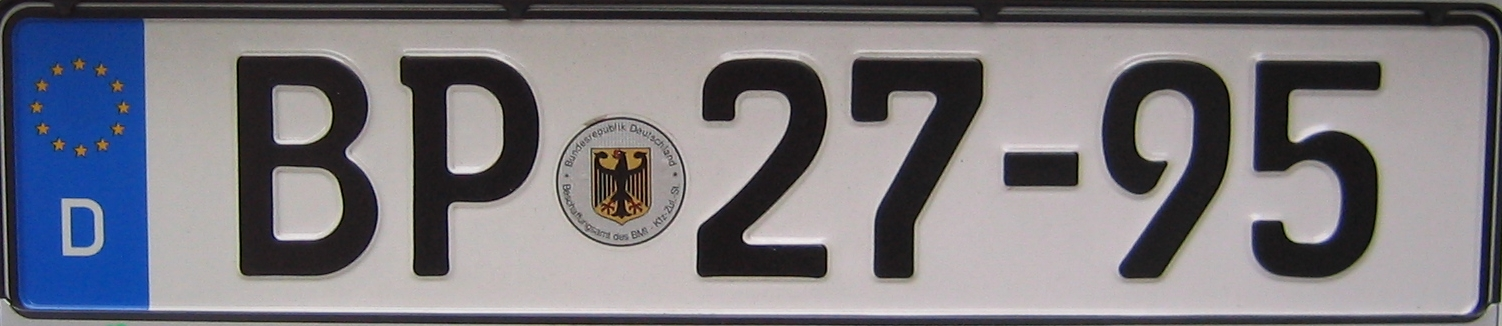
Bundespolizei (Federal Police), code BP in use since 2005

==== State governments ====
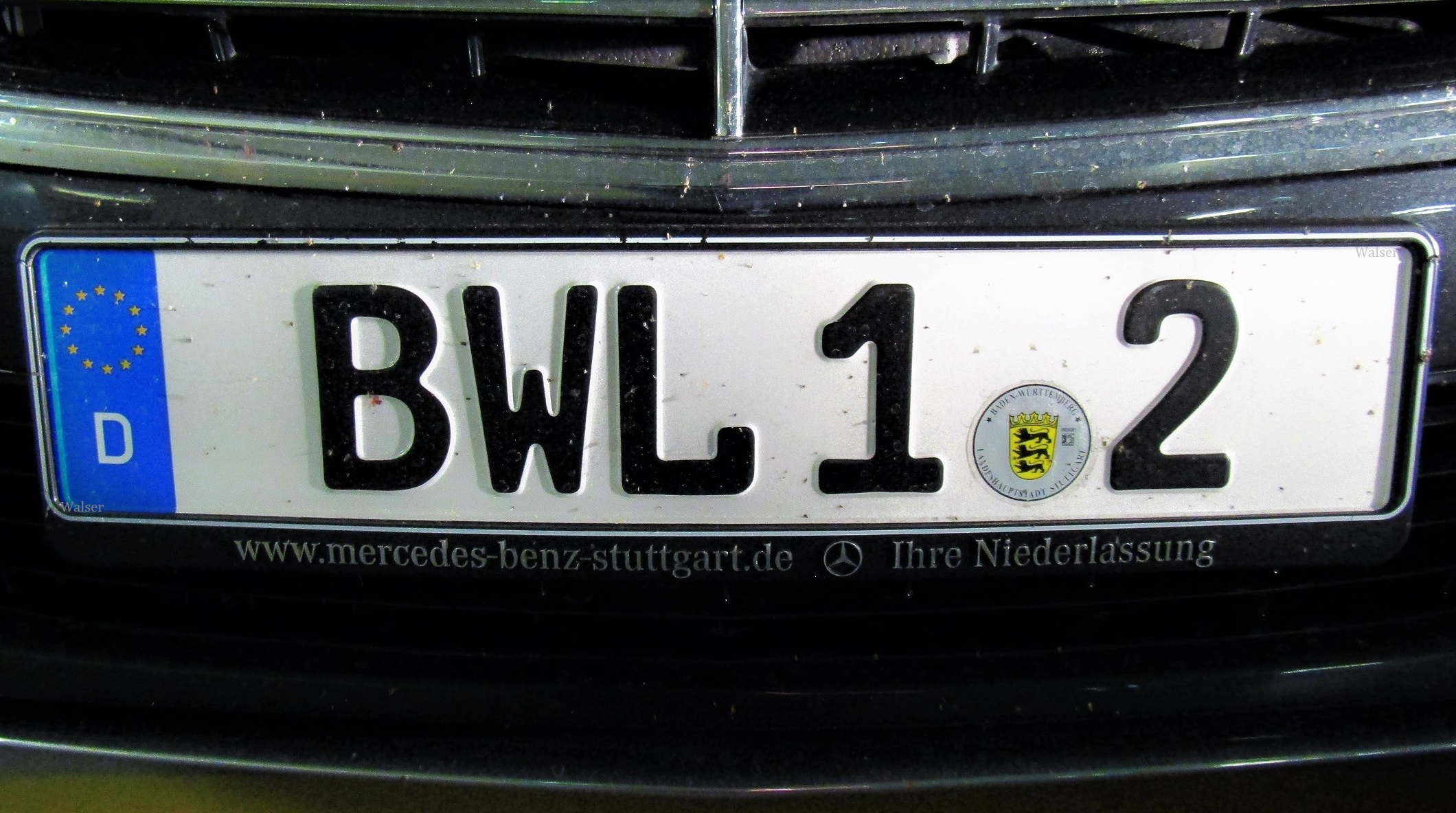
Vehicle of Baden-Württemberg state government

In a similar way as the federal government, the state governments and diets can use their respective codes. This difference is not made in the Stadtstaaten Berlin, Hamburg and Bremen, as they fulfil both district and state function in addition to their municipality's. In some Bundesländer, such as North Rhine-Westphalia, the state code is also used by the police. (Note: The Police of North Rhine-Westphalia uses NRW 4, NRW 5 and, for motorbikes, NRW 6 instead of a local code. This is followed by a four-digit number (e.g. NRW 4-1960).)

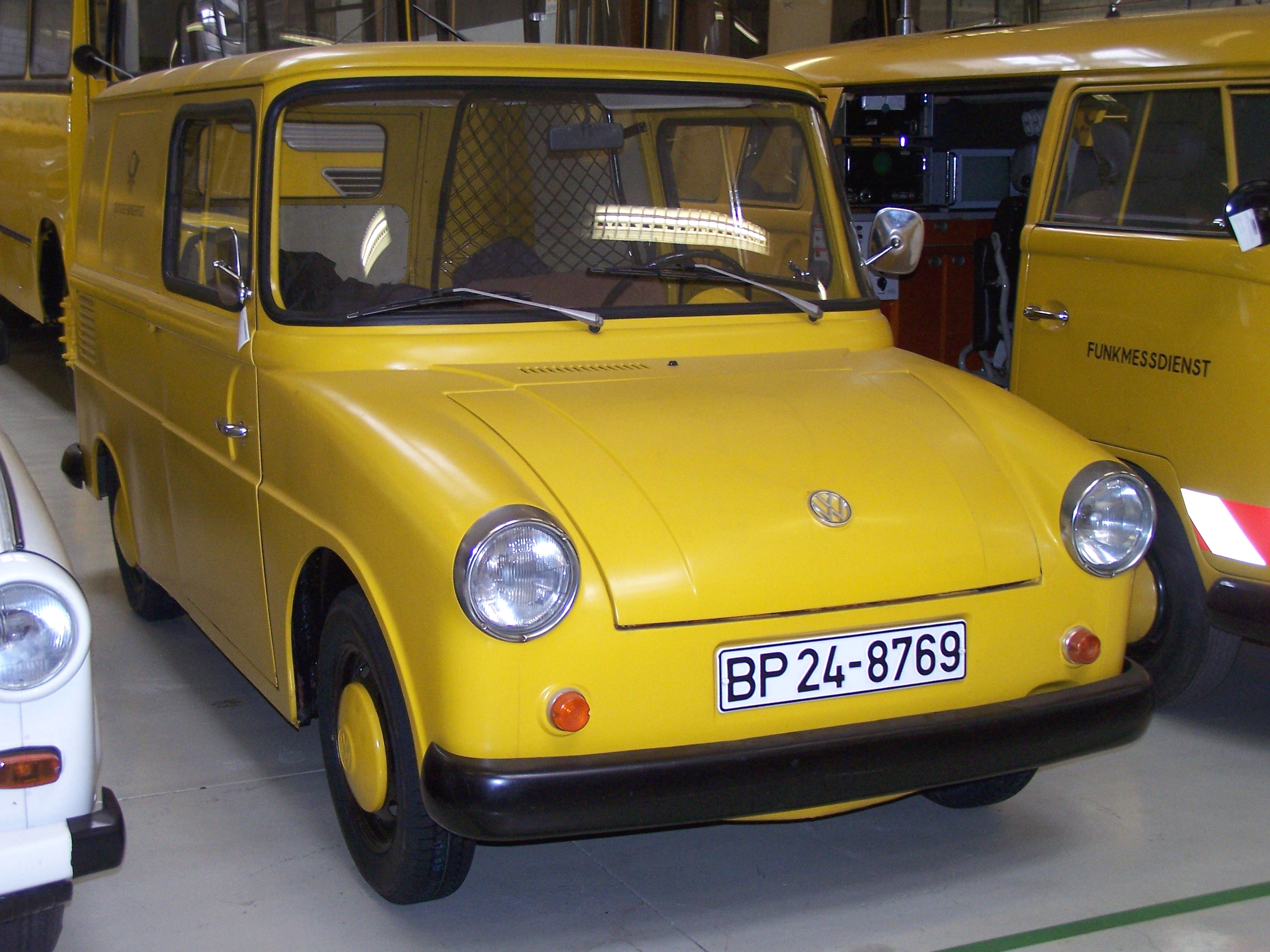
Bundespost vehicle, 1960s/70s, with old-style BP plate

==== Public sector ====
Before the legal reforms of 2006, official vehicles such as police, fire fighting and municipal administration did not carry a letter after the sticker, but only the district prefix and a number, such as M-1234. These included:

- vehicles of the district government: 1–199, 1000–1999, 10000–19999
- vehicles of the local government, e.g. fire brigade: 200–299, 2000–2999, 20000–29999, 300–399
- police: 3000–3999, 7000–7999, 30000–39999, 70000–79999
- disaster relief (mostly changed to "THW", see above): 8000–8999, 80000–89999

This style of plate is no longer issued in most states, but many official vehicles which were registered before 2006 still carry this type of plate.

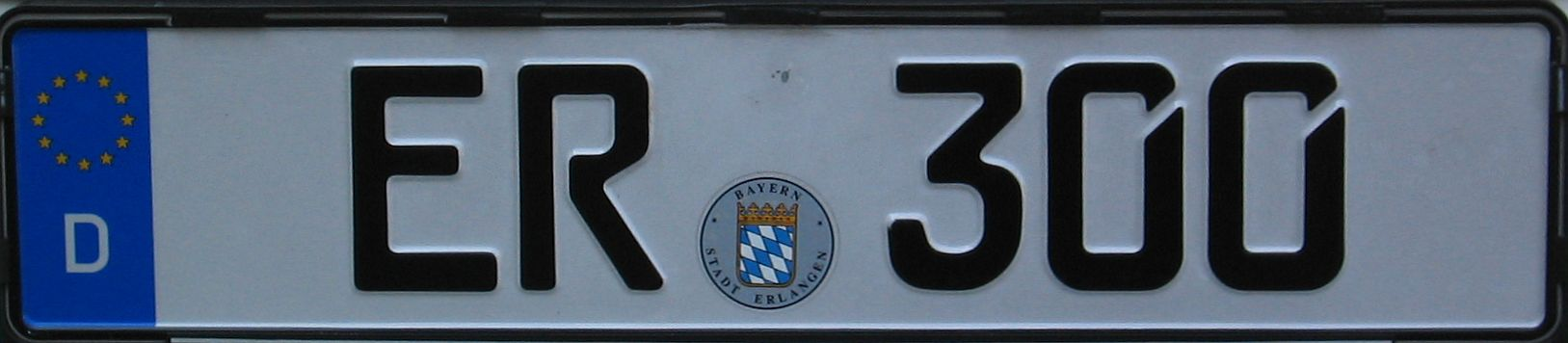
Official registered vehicle (here: fire brigade)

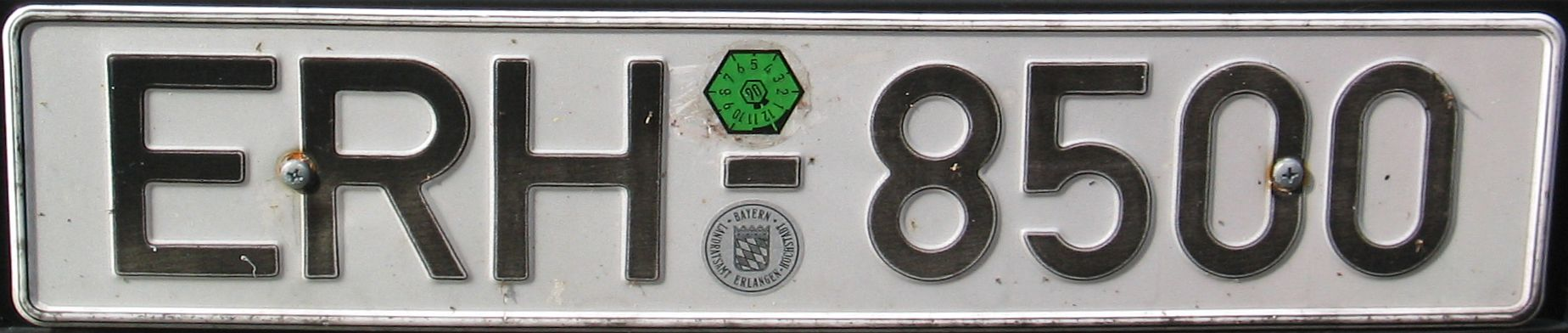
Official registered vehicle for disaster relief

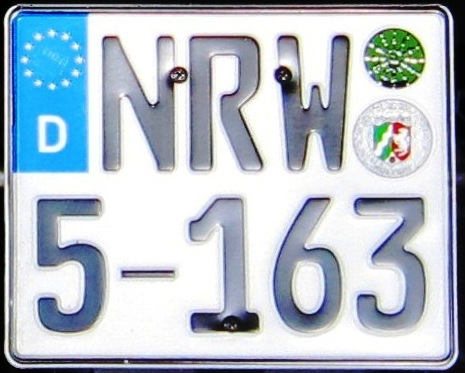
License plate of official vehicle in North Rhine-Westphalia

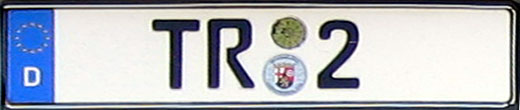
License plate of city council of Trier

A similar style is issued by some districts to consular or diplomatic vehicles in the form Aaa-9NNn (example: D-921). Unlike the other style of diplomatic/consular plates issued in Berlin and Bonn (see below), this plate does not indicate the nationality of the mission.

==== Diplomatic plates ====
Plates of cars covered by diplomatic immunity bear the digit 0 (Zero), followed by a two- or three-digit number which indicates the specific diplomatic mission, a hyphen and another number counting within this mission. Traditionally, a digit 1 in this final place denotes the ambassador or chef de mission. Lower-ranking embassy or consular staff without full diplomatic status are issued plates with the regular city code (mostly B for the capital, Berlin, or BN for the former capital, Bonn); the following numerals are analogous to the "0-plates", e.g. B 19–256. Further holders of diplomatic plates are certain international organizations, such as the UNHCR or the European Central Bank.

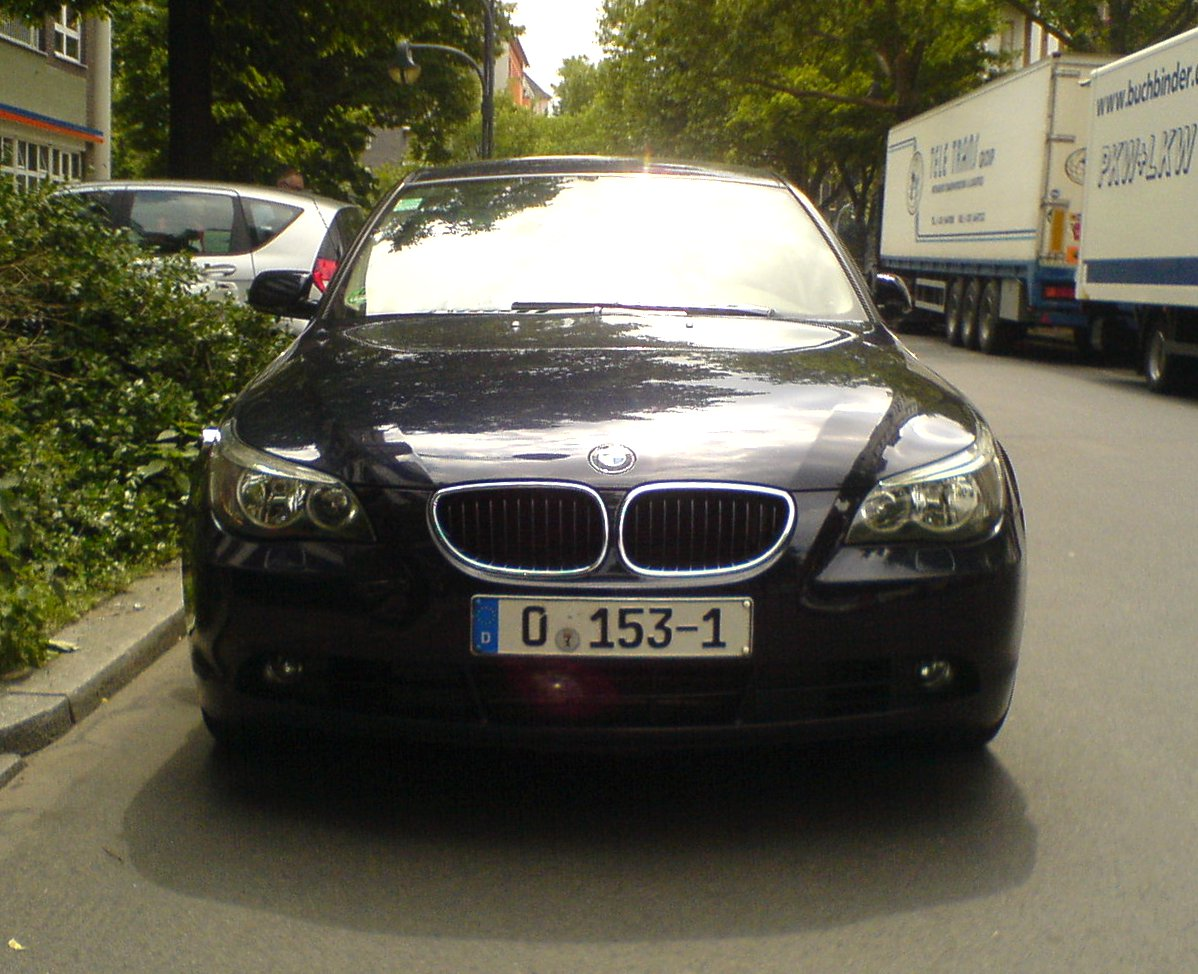
Car of the Cypriot ambassador

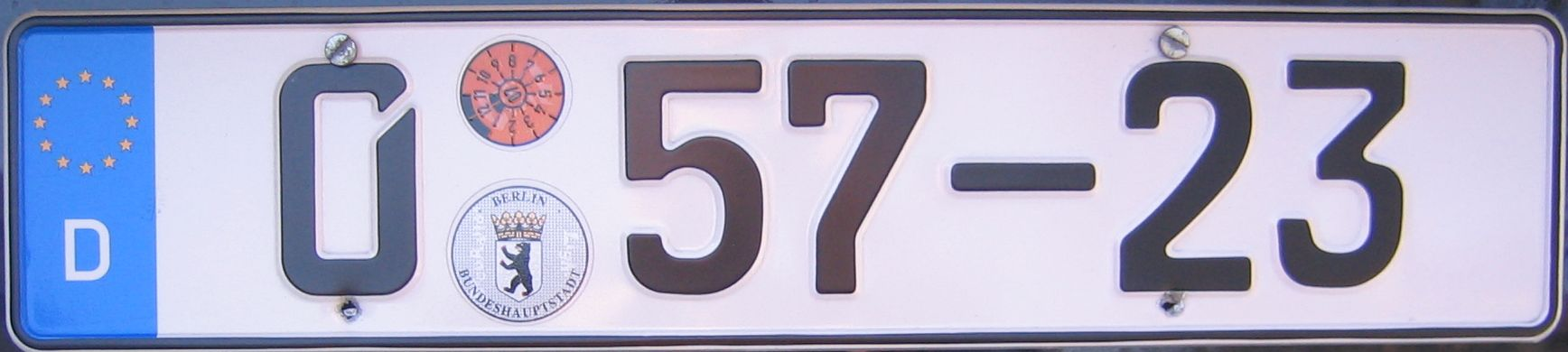
Diplomatic plate, Indonesian embassy in Berlin

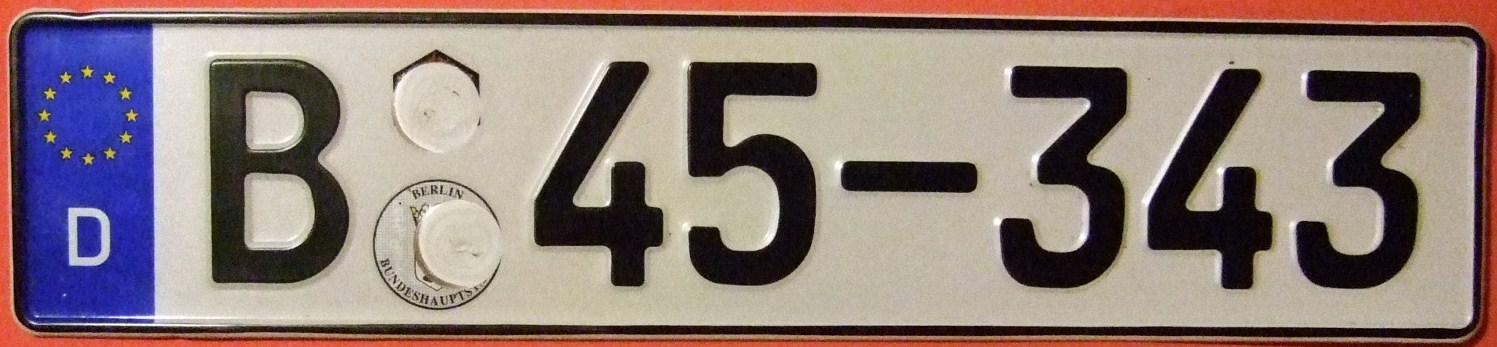
Plate for diplomatic employee, French embassy in Berlin

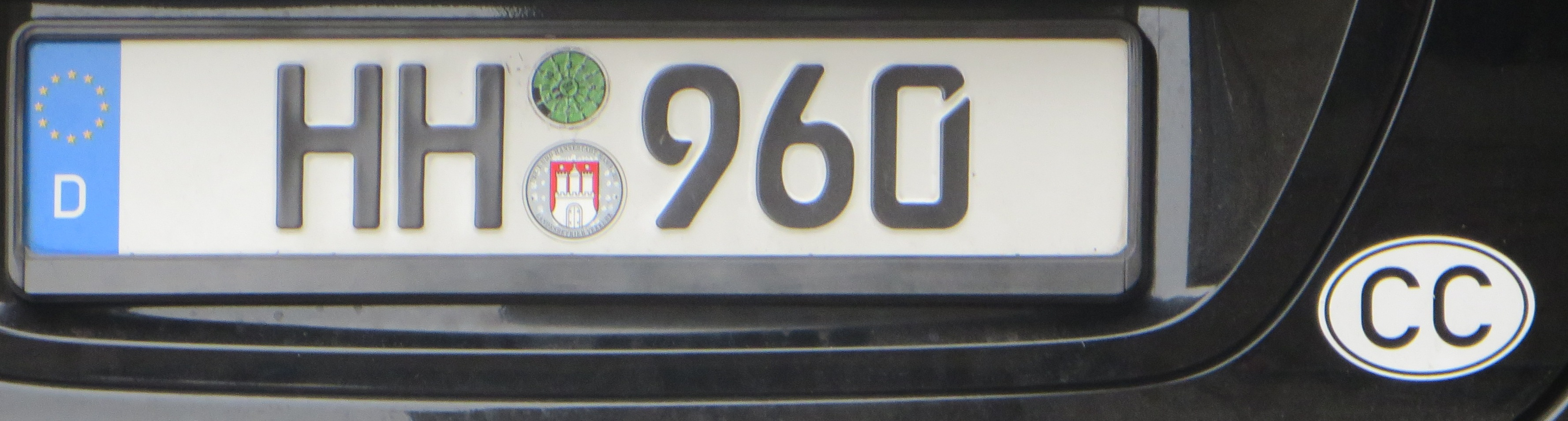
Consular corps plate in Hamburg

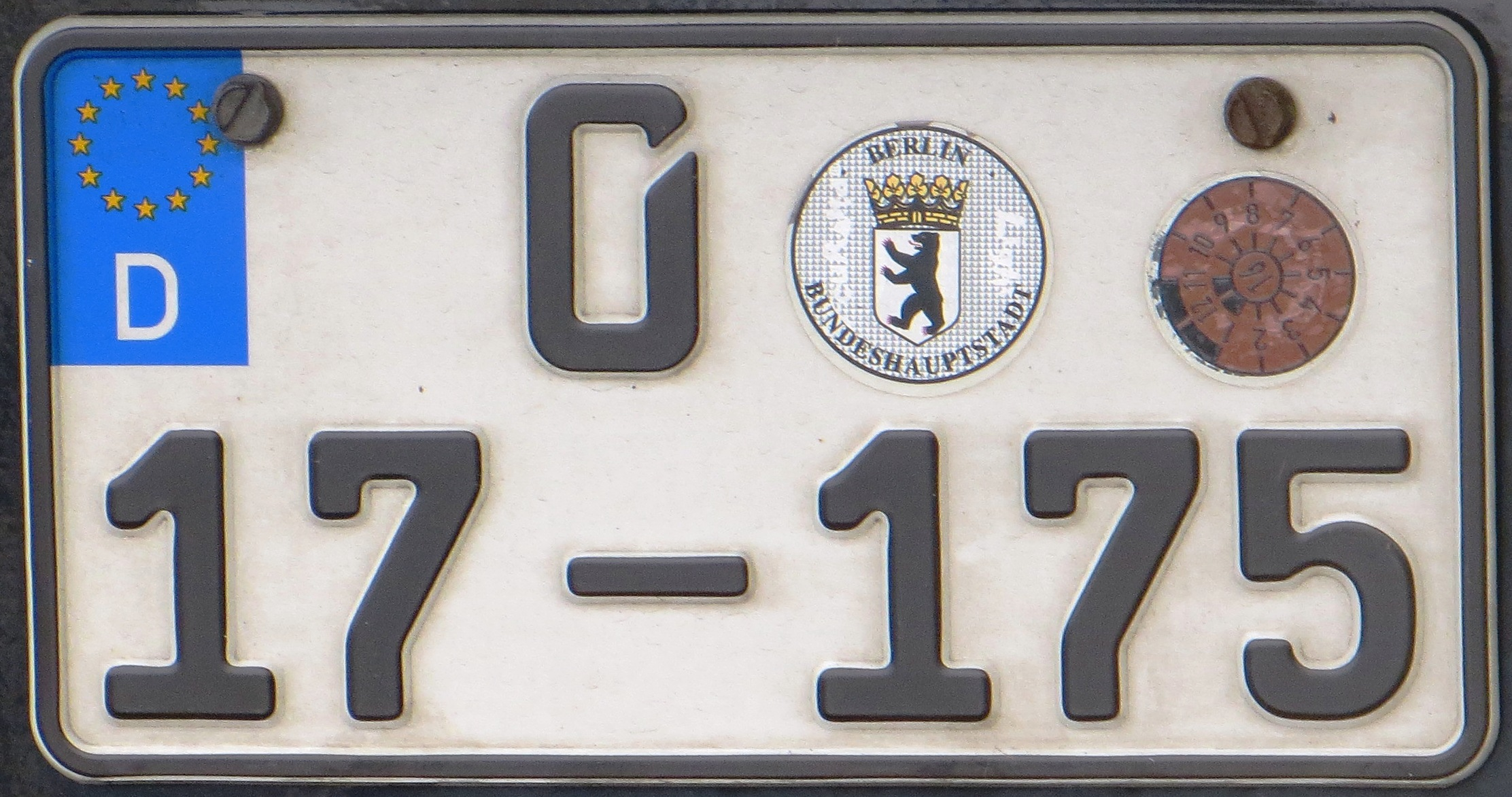
Small format plate for a U.S. diplomat

List
Diplomatic Codes on German Licence Plates
| Code | Flag with State | State in German | Notes |
|---|---|---|---|
| 10 (Note: The nuncio is declared doyen of the diplomatic corps and therefore bears the first available code.) | Vatican City | Vatikanstadt | |
| 11 | Egypt | Ägypten | |
| 12 | Angola | Angola | |
| 13 | Albania | Albanien | |
| 14 | Ethiopia | Äthiopien | |
| 15 | Afghanistan | Afghanistan | |
| 16 | Algeria | Algerien | |
| 17 | United States | Vereinigte Staaten von Amerika | Amerika |
| 18 | Argentina | Argentinien | |
| 19 | Australia | Australien | |
| 20 | Bangladesh | Bangladesch | |
| 21 | Belgium | Belgien | |
| 22 | Brunei | Brunei | |
| 23 | Bulgaria | Bulgarien | |
| 24 | Myanmar | Myanmar | formerly (Myanmar) Birma |
| 25 | Bolivia | Bolivien | |
| 26 | Brazil | Brasilien | |
| 27 | Burundi | Burundi | |
| 28 | Chile | Chile | |
| 29 | China | China | |
| 30 | Costa Rica | Costa Rica | |
| 31 | Belarus | Belarus | formerly (Belarus) Weißrussland |
| 32 | Bosnia and Herzegovina | Bosnien und Herzegowina | |
| 33 | Equatorial Guinea | Äquatorialguinea | |
| 34 | Denmark | Dänemark | |
| 35 | Benin | Benin | formerly Dahomey |
| 36 | Dominican Republic | Dominikanische Republik | |
| 37 | Ecuador | Ecuador / Ekuador | |
| 38 | Ivory Coast | Elfenbeinküste | |
| 39 | El Salvador | El Salvador | |
| 40 | Kosovo | Kosovo | |
| 41 | Estonia | Estland | |
| 42 | Liechtenstein | Liechtenstein | |
| 43 | Montenegro | Montenegro | |
| 44 | Finland | Finnland | |
| 45 | France | Frankreich | |
| 46 | Gabon | Gabun | |
| 47 | Ghana | Ghana | |
| 48 | Greece | Griechenland | |
| 49 | United Kingdom | Vereinigtes Königreich | Großbritannien |
| 50 | Guatemala | Guatemala | |
| 51 | Guinea | Guinea | |
| 52 | Latvia | Lettland | |
| 53 | Lithuania | Litauen | |
| 54 | Haiti | Haiti | |
| 55 | Honduras | Honduras | |
| 56 | India | Indien | |
| 57 | Indonesia | Indonesien | |
| 58 | Iraq | Irak | |
| 59 | Iran | Iran | |
| 60 | Ireland | Irland | |
| 61 | Iceland | Island | |
| 62 | Laos | Laos | |
| 63 | Cape Verde | Kap Verde | |
| 64 | Israel | Israel | |
| 65 | Italy | Italien | |
| 66 | Jamaica | Jamaika | |
| 67 | Japan | Japan | |
| 68 | Yemen | Jemen | |
| 69 | Jordan | Jordanien | |
| 70 | Serbia | Serbien | formerly (Socialist Federal Republic of Yugoslavia) Jugoslawien |
| 71 | Kuwait | Kuwait | |
| 72 | Cuba | Kuba | |
| 73 | Qatar | Katar | |
| 74 | Cameroon | Kamerun | |
| 75 | Canada | Kanada | |
| 76 | Kenya | Kenia | |
| 77 | Colombia | Kolumbien | |
| 78 | Republic of the Congo | Kongo | |
| 79 | South Korea | Südkorea | Korea (Republik) |
| 80 | Lebanon | Libanon | |
| 81 | Liberia | Liberia | |
| 82 | Libya | Libyen | |
| 83 | Lesotho | Lesotho | |
| 84 | Luxembourg | Luxemburg | |
| 85 | Madagascar | Madagaskar | |
| 86 | Malawi | Malawi | |
| 87 | Malaysia | Malaysia | |
| 88 | Mali | Mali | |
| 89 | Morocco | Marokko | |
| 90 | Mauritania | Mauretanien | |
| 91 | Mexico | Mexiko | |
| 92 | Malta | Malta | |
| 93 | Monaco | Monaco | |
| 94 | Nepal | Nepal | |
| 95 | New Zealand | Neuseeland | |
| 96 | Nicaragua | Nicaragua | |
| 97 | Netherlands | Niederlande | |
| 98 | Niger | Niger | |
| 99 | Nigeria | Nigeria | |
| 100 | Norway | Norwegen | |
| 101 | Mongolia | Mongolei | |
| 102 | Mozambique | Mosambik | a.k.a. (Mozambique) Moçambique |
| 103 | Oman | Oman | |
| 104 | Burkina Faso | Burkina Faso | formerly (Republic of Upper Volta) Obervolta |
| 105 | Austria | Österreich | |
| 106 | Pakistan | Pakistan | |
| 107 | Panama | Panama | |
| 108 | Paraguay | Paraguay | |
| 109 | Peru | Peru | |
| 110 | Philippines | Philippinen | |
| 111 | Poland | Polen | |
| 112 | Portugal | Portugal | |
| 113 | Papua New Guinea | Papua-Neuguinea | |
| 114 | Namibia | Namibia | |
| 115 | Rwanda | Ruanda | (Rwanda) |
| 116 | Romania | Rumänien | |
| 117 | Zambia | Sambia | |
| 118 | Saudi Arabia | Saudi-Arabien | |
| 119 | Sweden | Schweden | |
| 120 | Switzerland | Schweiz | |
| 121 | Senegal | Senegal | |
| 122 | Sierra Leone | Sierra Leone | |
| 123 | Singapore | Singapur | |
| 124 | Zimbabwe | Simbabwe | |
| 125 | Somalia | Somalia | |
| 126 | Spain | Spanien | |
| 127 | Sri Lanka | Sri Lanka | |
| 128 | Sudan | Sudan | |
| 129 | South Africa | Südafrika | |
| 130 | Syria | Syrien | |
| 131 | Tanzania | Tansania | |
| 132 | Thailand | Thailand | |
| 133 | Togo | Togo | |
| 134 | Tonga | Tonga | |
| 135 | Czech Republic | Tschechien | formerly (Czechoslovakia) Tschechoslowakei |
| 136 | Chad | Tschad | |
| 137 | Turkey | Türkei | |
| 138 | Tunisia | Tunesien | |
| 139 | Uganda | Uganda | |
| 140 | Russia | Russland | formerly UdSSR = Soviet Union |
| 141 | Uruguay | Uruguay | |
| 142 | Hungary | Ungarn | |
| 143 | Ukraine | Ukraine | |
| 144 | Grenada | Grenada | |
| 146 | Venezuela | Venezuela | |
| 147 | Vietnam | Vietnam | |
| 148 | United Arab Emirates | Vereinigte Arabische Emirate | |
| 151 | Democratic Republic of the Congo | Demokratische Republik Kongo | formerly Zaire |
| 152 | Central African Republic | Zentralafrikanische Republik | |
| 153 | Cyprus | Zypern | |
| 154 | Croatia | Kroatien | |
| 155 | Slovenia | Slowenien | |
| 156 | Azerbaijan | Aserbaidschan | |
| 157 | Slovakia | Slowakei | |
| 158 | Kazakhstan | Kasachstan | |
| 159 | North Macedonia | Nordmazedonien | |
| 160 | Uzbekistan | Usbekistan | |
| 160 | East Germany before 1990 | DDR | |
| 161 | Eritrea | Eritrea | |
| 162 | Georgia | Georgien | |
| 163 | Tajikistan | Tadschikistan | |
| 164 | Bahrain | Bahrain | |
| 165 | Cambodia | Kambodscha | |
| 166 | Armenia | Armenien | |
| 167 | Kyrgyzstan | Kirgisistan | |
| 168 | Moldova | Moldawien | a.k.a. Republik Moldau |
| 169 | Turkmenistan | Turkmenistan | |
| 170 | International Labour Organization | Internationale Arbeitsorganisation | ILO |
| 171 | European Central Bank | Europäische Zentralbank | ECB |
| 172 | European Union Aviation Safety Agency | Europäische Agentur für Flugsicherheit | EASA |
| 173 | United Nations High Commissioner for Refugees | Hoher Flüchtlings-Kommissar | UNHCR |
| 174 | Organisation for Joint Armament Cooperation | Gemeinsame Organisation für Rüstungskooperation | OCCAR |
| 175 | International Organization for Migration | Verbindungsstelle der Internationalen Organisation für Migration | IOM |
| 176 | Arab League | Liga der Arabischen Staaten | جامعة الدول العربية |
| 177 | Franco-German Youth Office | Deutsch-Französisches Jugendwerk | Office franco-allemand pour la Jeunesse, OFAJ |
| 178 | European Space Operations Centre | Europäisches Operations-Zentrum für Weltraumforschung | ESOC |
| 179 | NATO Eurofighter and Tornado Management Agency | NATO-Agentur für Entwicklung, Produktion und Logistische Betreuung der Waffensysteme EF 2000 und Tornado | NETMA |
| 180 | European Southern Observatory | Europäische Südsternwarte | ESO |
| 181 | European Molecular Biology Laboratory | Europäisches Laboratorium für Molekularbiologie | EMBL |
| 182 | (European Union) European Commission | Europäische Kommission | |
| 183 | European Patent Office | Europäisches Patentamt | EPO |
| 184 | Organisation for Economic Co-operation and Development | Organisation für wirtschaftliche Zusammenarbeit und Entwicklung | OECD |
| 185 | (United Nations) World Food Programme | Welternährungsprogramm der Vereinten Nationen (UNEP) | WFP |
| 186 | European Organisation for the Exploitation of Meteorological Satellites | Europäische Organisation für die Nutzung meteorologischer Satelliten | EUMETSAT |
| 187 | European Astronaut Centre | Europäisches Astronautenzentrum | EAC |
| 188 | UNESCO Institute for Lifelong Learning | UNESCO-Institut für lebenslanges Lernen | UIL |
| 189 | German-Polish Youth Office | Deutsch-Polnisches Jugendwerk (DPJW) | Polsko-Niemiecka Współpraca Młodzieży (PNWM) |
| 190 | World Bank | Weltbank | IFC |
| 191 | European Center for Environment and Health | Europäisches Zentrum für Umwelt und Gesundheit | |
| 192 | (United Nations) UNEP Convention on the Conservation of Migratory Species of Wild Animals | Umweltprogramm der UN, Sekretariat zur Erhaltung der wandernden wildlebenden Tierarten | CMS |
| 193 | United Nations Framework Convention on Climate Change | Sekretariat der Klimarahmen-Konvention | UNFCCC |
| 194 | United Nations Volunteers | Freiwilligenprogramm der Vereinten Nationen | UNV |
| 195 | International Tribunal for the Law of the Sea | Internationaler Seegerichtshof | ITLOS |
| 196 | United Nations Information Centres | Informationszentrum der Vereinten Nationen | UNIC |
| 197 | United Nations Convention to Combat Desertification | UN-Sekretariat der Wüstenkonvention | UNCCD |
| 198 | (UNESCO) International Centre for Technical and Vocational Education and Training | Internationales Zentrum für Berufsbildung | UNEVOC |
| 199 | United Nations University | Universität der Vereinten Nationen, Forschungsinstitut für Katastrophenmanagement | UNU |
| 200 | Mauritius | Mauritius | |
| 201 | North Korea | Nordkorea | Demokratische Volksrepublik Korea |
| 202 | Djibouti | Dschibuti | |
| 203 | Guinea-Bissau | Guinea-Bissau | |
| 204 | South Sudan | Südsudan | |
| 205 | Botswana | Botswana | |
| 206 | Maldives | Malediven | |
| 207–299 | available for further nations | | |
| 300 | United Nations Office for Outer Space Affairs / United Nations Platform for Space-based Information for Disaster Management and Emergency Response | Plattform der Vereinten Nationen für raumfahrtgestützte Informationen für Katastrophenmanagement und Notfallmaßnahmen | UNOOSA/UN-SPIDER |
| 301 | (United Nations) UNEP Study The Economics of Ecosystems and Biodiversity | Studie "Die Ökonomie der Ökosysteme und der biologischen Vielfalt" | TEEB |
| 302 | International Renewable Energy Agency | Internationale Organisation für Erneuerbare Energien | IRENA |
| 303 | Global Crop Diversity Trust | Welttreuhandfonds für Kulturpflanzenvielfalt | GCDT |
| 304 | (United Nations) UN SDG Action Campaign | Aktionskampagne für die Ziele der Vereinten Nationen für nachhaltige Entwicklung | SDG |
| 305 | (United Nations) Global Center for UN Personal Services | Globales Zentrum für Personaldienste der Vereinten Nationen | oneHR |
| 306 | (United Nations) UNICEF, Berlin office | UNICEF, Büro Berlin | |
| 307 | World Bank, Berlin Office | Weltbank, Büro Berlin | |
| 308 | United Nations Research Institute for Social Development | Forschungsinstitut der Vereinten Nationen für Soziale Entwicklung | UNRISD |
| 309 | (United Nations) Initiative for Transparency in Climate Protection | Initiative für Transparenz im Klimaschutz | UNOPS-ICAT |
| 310 | (United Nations) Secretariate for Water Supply | UN-Habitat/-Sekretariat für Wasserversorgung | GWOPA |
| 311 | United Nations System Staff College | Wissenszentrum für nachhaltige Entwicklung | UNSSC |
| 312 | (United Nations) World Health Organization | Weltgesundheitsorganisation | WHO |
| 313 | United Nations Institute for Training and Research | Ausbildungs- und Forschungsinstitut der Vereinten Nationen | UNITAR |
| 314 | United Nations Development Programme | Entwicklungsprogramm der Vereinten Nationen | UNDP |
| 315 | Joint United Nations Programme on HIV/AIDS | Gemeinsames Programm der Vereinten Nationen für HIV/Aids | UNAIDS |
| 316 | United Nations Department of Economic and Social Affairs | Hauptabteilung Wirtschaftliche und Soziale Angelegenheiten der Vereinten Nationen | UN-DESA |
| 317 | Bank for International Settlements | Bank für internationalen Zahlungsausgleich | BIZ |
| 318 | European Centre for Medium-Range Weather Forecasts | Europäisches Zentrum für mittelfristige Wettervorhersage | ECMWF / EZMW |
| 319 | European Union – Latin America and Caribbean Foundation | EU-Lateinamerika-Karibik-Stiftung | EU-LAK |
| 320 | United Nations Population Fund | Bevölkerungsfonds der Vereinten Nationen | UNFPA |
| 321 | (European Union) Anti-Money Laundering Authority | Behörde zur Bekämpfung von Geldwäsche und Terrorismusfinanzierung | AMLA |
| 322 | United Nations Entity for Gender Equality and the Empowerment of Women | Einheit der Vereinten Nationen für Gleichstellung und Ermächtigung der Frauen | |
| 323 | International Holocaust Remembrance Alliance | Internationale Allianz zum Holocaustgedenken | IHRA |
| 324–399 | available for further organisations | | |

==== Military ====
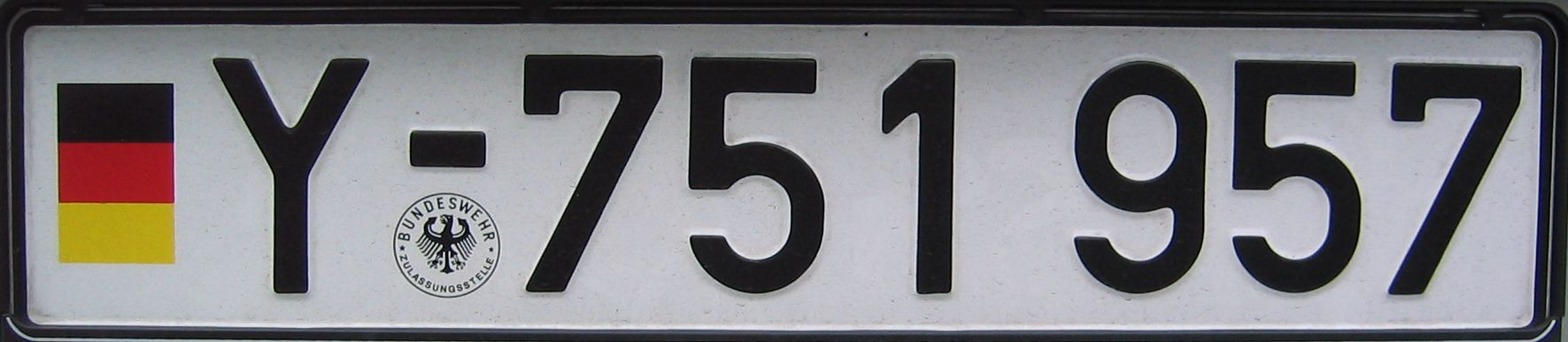
Bundeswehr (armed forces)

- Bundeswehr uses old style non-reflecting plates. The German flag is shown, instead of the blue EU strip. Bundeswehr plates use the letter Y instead of a city code, as no German city has this initial. The Y is followed by a dash and a six-digit number (or five digits for motorcycles), for example Y-123 456. These vehicles are tax-exempt and need not to be insured since the German government acts as insurer. There is also no mandatory technical inspection required but the Armed Forces carry out a regular internal inspection on these vehicles similar to the official inspection.
- Military vehicles which are used by the NATO headquarters in Germany use the same design as the Y-plates except they carry the letter X followed by a four-digit number, for example X-1234.

=== Different colours ===
Very rarely, German licence plates bear characters in different colours than black. These exceptions are:

==== Green on white ====
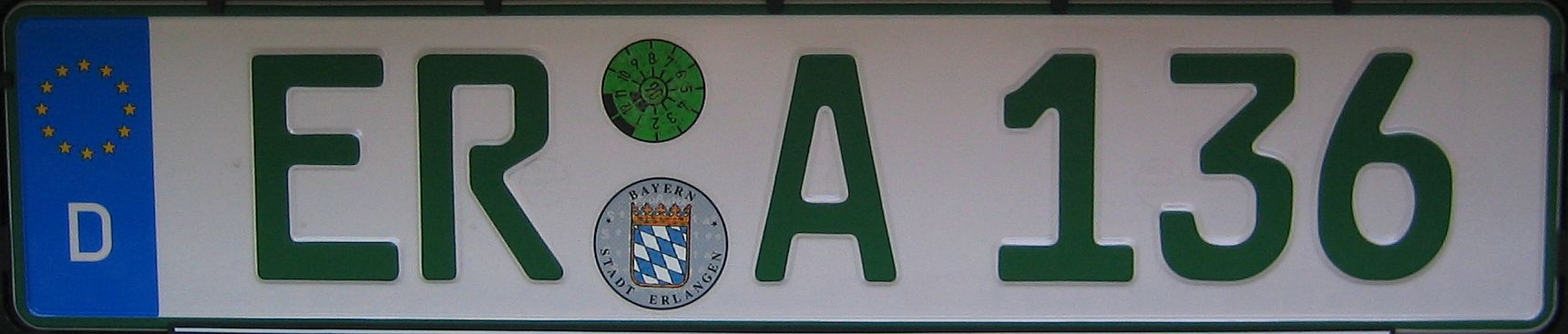
Plate for tax-exempt vehicles

Vehicles which are exempt from vehicle taxes (for example ambulances, tractors, agricultural trailers, trailers for boats or trailers for gliders) have green print on a white background plate. Regular trailers for lorries can be exempted from tax if the owner agrees to pay an increased tax on the vehicle which tows the trailer.

==== Red on white – 06 ====
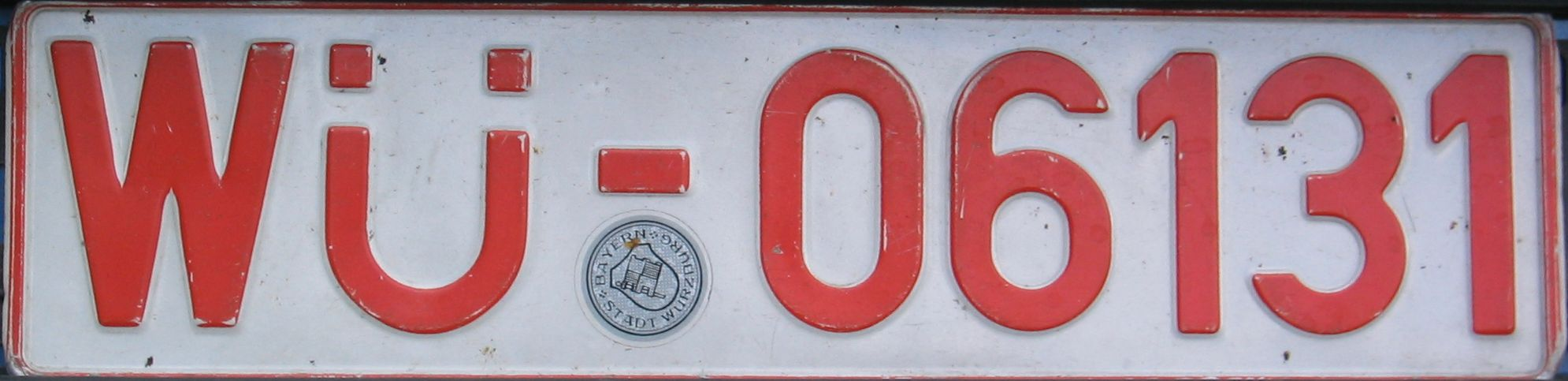
Plate for dealer's cars (red colour, old DIN-style)

Car dealers' plates are in red print on a white background, and the code begins with 06. Red plates may be attached to cars which are changing hands, such as the test run of unregistered cars, and the liability insurance is connected to the plate, not a specific car.

==== Red on white – 07 ====
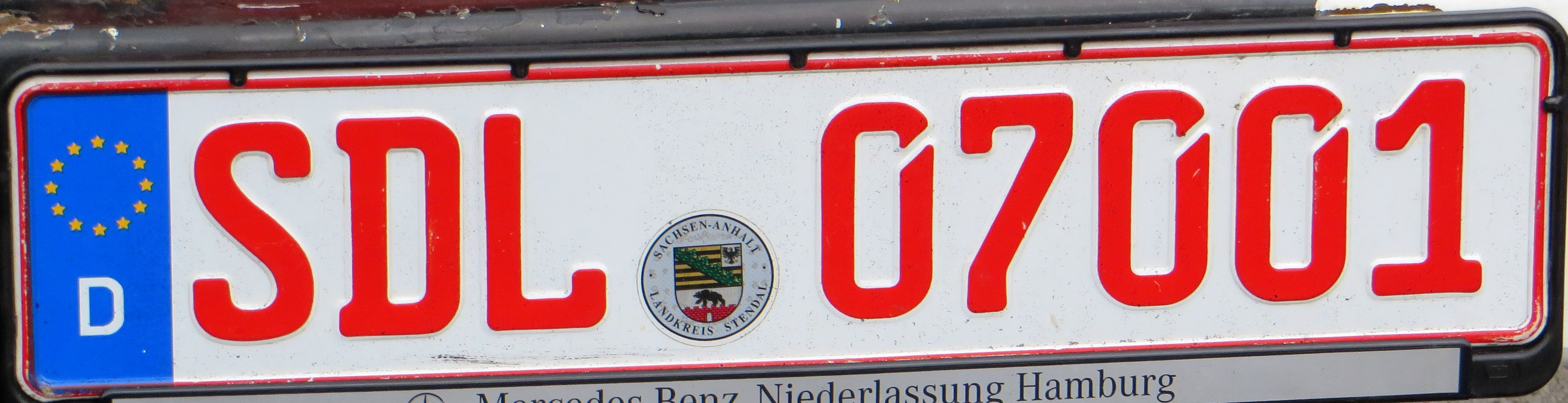
Plate for vintage car collector

Red plates starting with the number 07 are reserved for collectors of vintage vehicles. Originally, vintage vehicles had a required minimum age of 20 years from first registering. Since April 2007, the required minimum age has been 30 years. Plates issued under the old 20 years rule remained valid after this date. The collectors must get an official certificate of approval (such as no criminal records). They are allowed to use one set of plates on any of their vehicles under the condition that they keep a strict record of use. No day-to-day use of the vehicles is allowed. A valid official technical inspection is not mandatory but the vehicles have to be technically fit for use on public roads.

=== Different formats and styles ===
==== H for historic ====
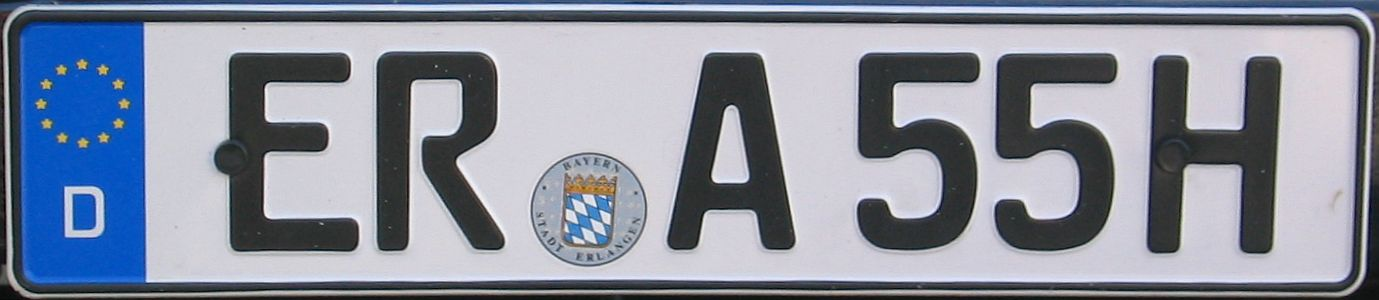
Plate for a specific vintage car

Classic vehicles (known in German by the pseudo-English expression Oldtimer) can get an H (historisch, historic) at the end of the plate, such as K-AA 100H in order to preserve the so-called "vehicle of cultural value" (kraftfahrtechnisches Kulturgut). This also implies a flat tax of around €190 per year. It is popular to choose the digits so that they indicate the car's year of manufacture. The requirements for a vehicle to receive an H-Plate are:

- The first documented registration was at least 30 years ago.
- The car must be in mostly original and preservation worthy condition. Preservation worthy means a grade C by popular car grading standards. The older the car, the more signs of usage it can show. This purely concerns the car's appearance; the road worthiness is established by separate mandatory safety inspections. (Note: Universally accepted modifications include changes that benefit safety, such as seat belts and disc brakes, and environmental friendliness, such as catalytic converters and LPG conversions (if invisible from the outside). Further modifications that are generally accepted are those contemporary of the car's first registration (plus and minus 10 years, burden of proof lies with the owner through historic material such as photographs) and new paintjobs of any colour, including two-tone paint if originally offered and historic company logos, but no murals or custom patterns.)

==== E for electric ====
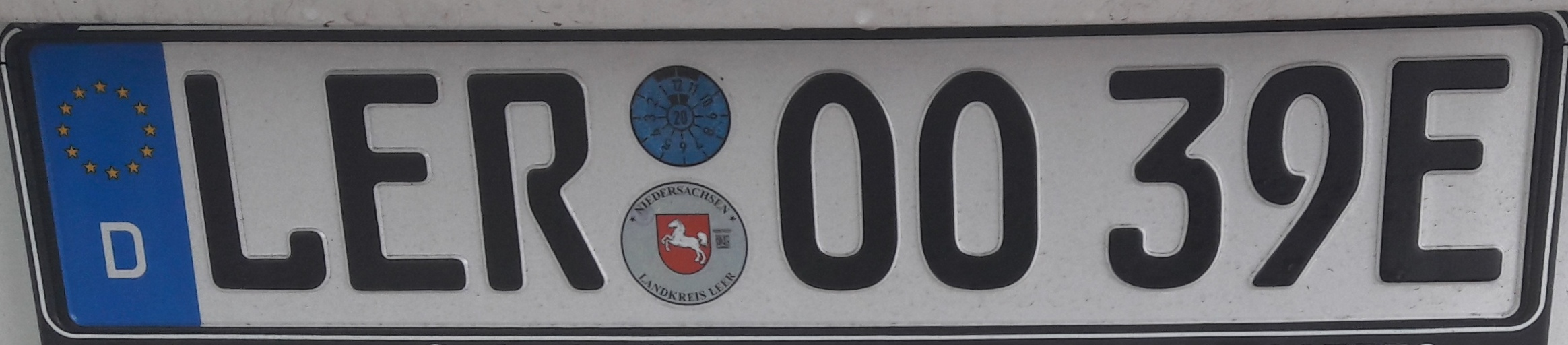
Plate for Plug-in electric vehicle

The 2015 Electric Mobility Act authorised issuing special licence plates for plug-in electric vehicles to allow proper identification to avoid abuses of these privileges. The special licence plate adds the letter E at the end of the licence number. Owners of all-electric cars and plug-in hybrids with a minimum all-electric range of 40 km (25 mi) can apply for the special licence. The minimum range for eligible plug-in hybrids was increased from 30 km (19 mi) from 1 January 2018.

==== Seasonal ====
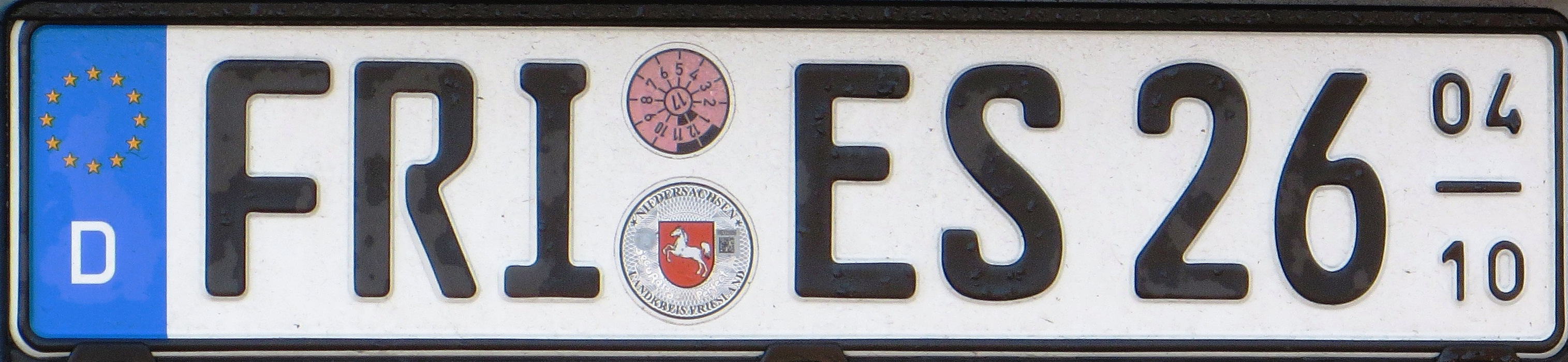
Seasonal number plate, here valid from 1 April to 31 October of each year

Seasonal number plates are popular for motorbikes or convertibles in the summertime, or for "winter cars" substituting them, yet these plates are available for any vehicle. They bear two 2-digit numbers at the end of the plate indicating the months between which they are registered to drive, with the licence being valid from the start of the upper month until the end of the lower month. This results in lower car taxes, as well as lower insurance premiums.

==== Interchangeable ====
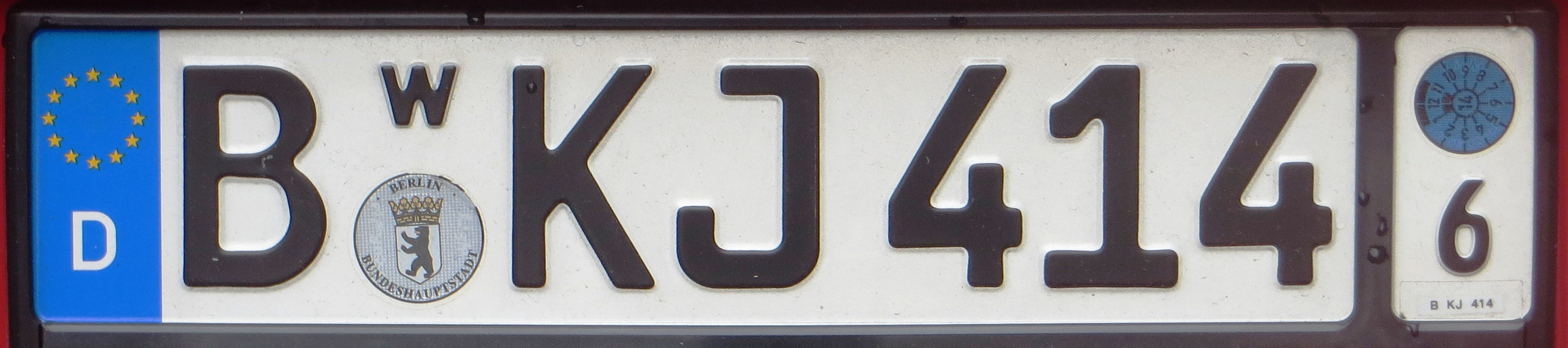
Interchangeable licence plate (Wechselkennzeichen)

Two vehicles of the same class (two cars, two motorbikes or light vehicles, two trailers) may be registered with an alternating licence plate. In this case, only the last digit varies – e.g. B-KJ 414|5 and B-KJ 414|6 – and is printed on an extra plate which remains on either vehicle, whereas the main part of the plate has to be attached to the vehicle in use. The main part carries the registration seal and a small letter W for Wechselkennzeichen, the individual part carries the technical inspection seal and below, in very small letters, the associated main number. Both vehicles have to pay full tax, yet the insurance premium may be discounted.

==== Temporary registration ====
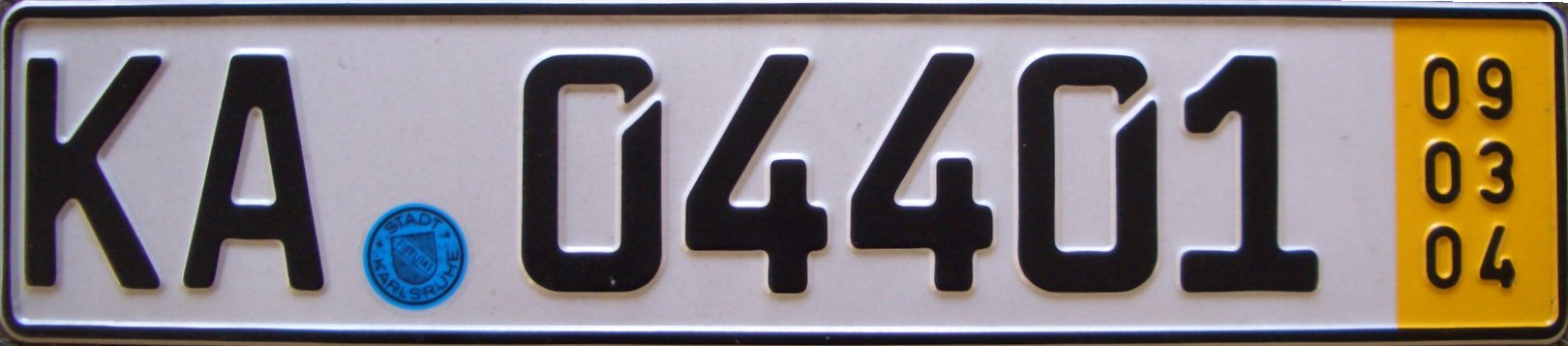
Temporary plate (Kurzzeit-Kennzeichen); this one was valid until 9 March 2004.

Used vehicles which are not currently registered to any person or company – or have been deregistered by their current owner, temporarily or permanently – can be driven on public roads using short-term plates, valid for five days only. These are known as "temporary number plates" or "yellow number plates", due to the yellow stripe. The first letter(s) indicate the issuing authority, as in regular German registrations. The numeric code starts with the numbers 04, e.g. DD-04321, and the plate has a yellow stripe on the right showing when they are valid. The date is listed numerically, on three lines, reading day, month, year, with two digits each. The vehicle need not have a valid technical inspection, however it must be technically fit to be operated in public. Typically they are used to drive to/from a technical inspection, or to move storage location of the vehicle. Insurance premiums are quite high, appr. €100 for the above-mentioned 5 days. Most insurance companies credit this premium if the car is registered as a normal car with the same insurance company after these 5 days. These temporary plates are only valid within Germany, and cannot be used to export the vehicle to a foreign country nor for transit. They can only be obtained by a resident of Germany.

==== Export ====
Ausfuhrkennzeichen (export plates) are used for exporting vehicles abroad. The owner does not have to be a German resident to register the car, but must provide identification such as a passport or ID card. The date on the red stripe on the right hand side shows the expiration date of the plate, as it indicates for how long the vehicle insurance and tax are paid. After this date, the vehicle must have left Germany, and is automatically deregistered from the German vehicle registration system. Use of the vehicle within Germany is permitted until the export date.

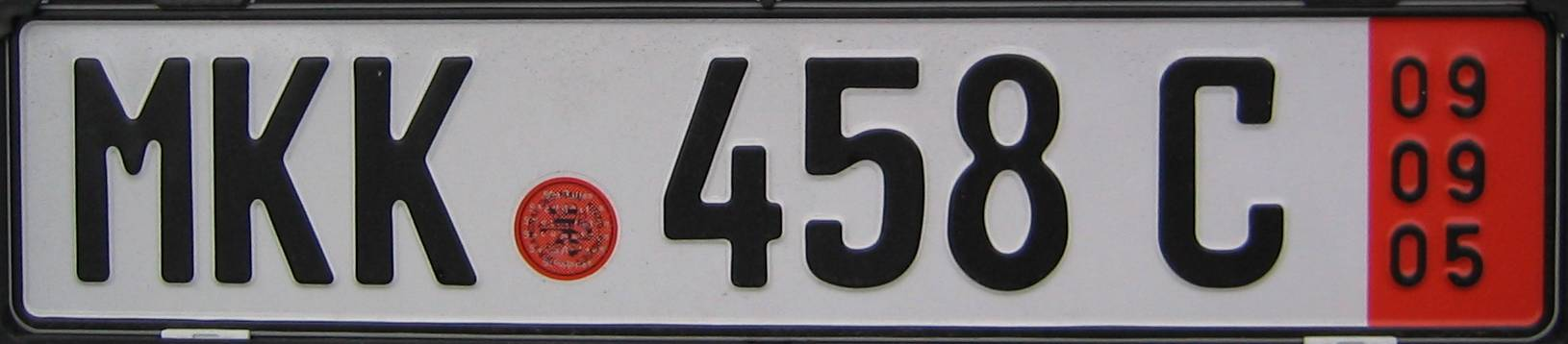
Special plate for vehicles to be exported (Ausfuhrkennzeichen)

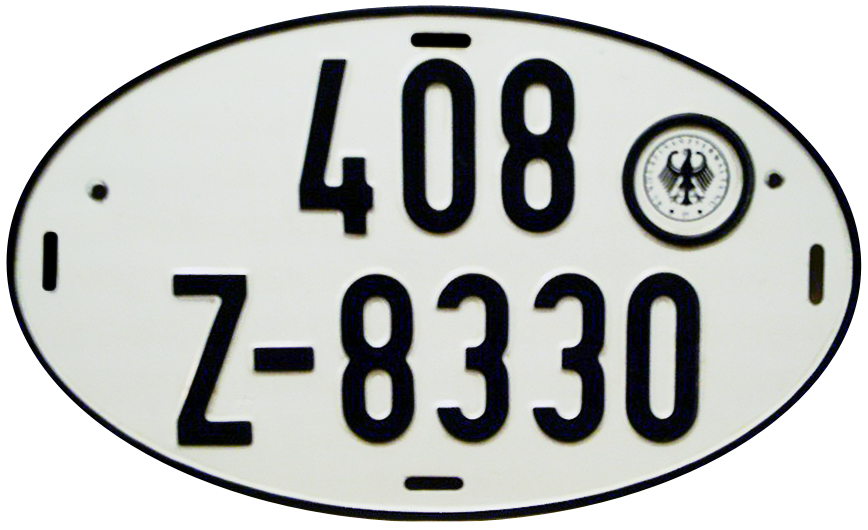
Former special plate for vehicles to be exported (Zollkennzeichen, customs plate) — no longer in use. It was replaced by the Ausfuhrkennzeichen in the 1980s.

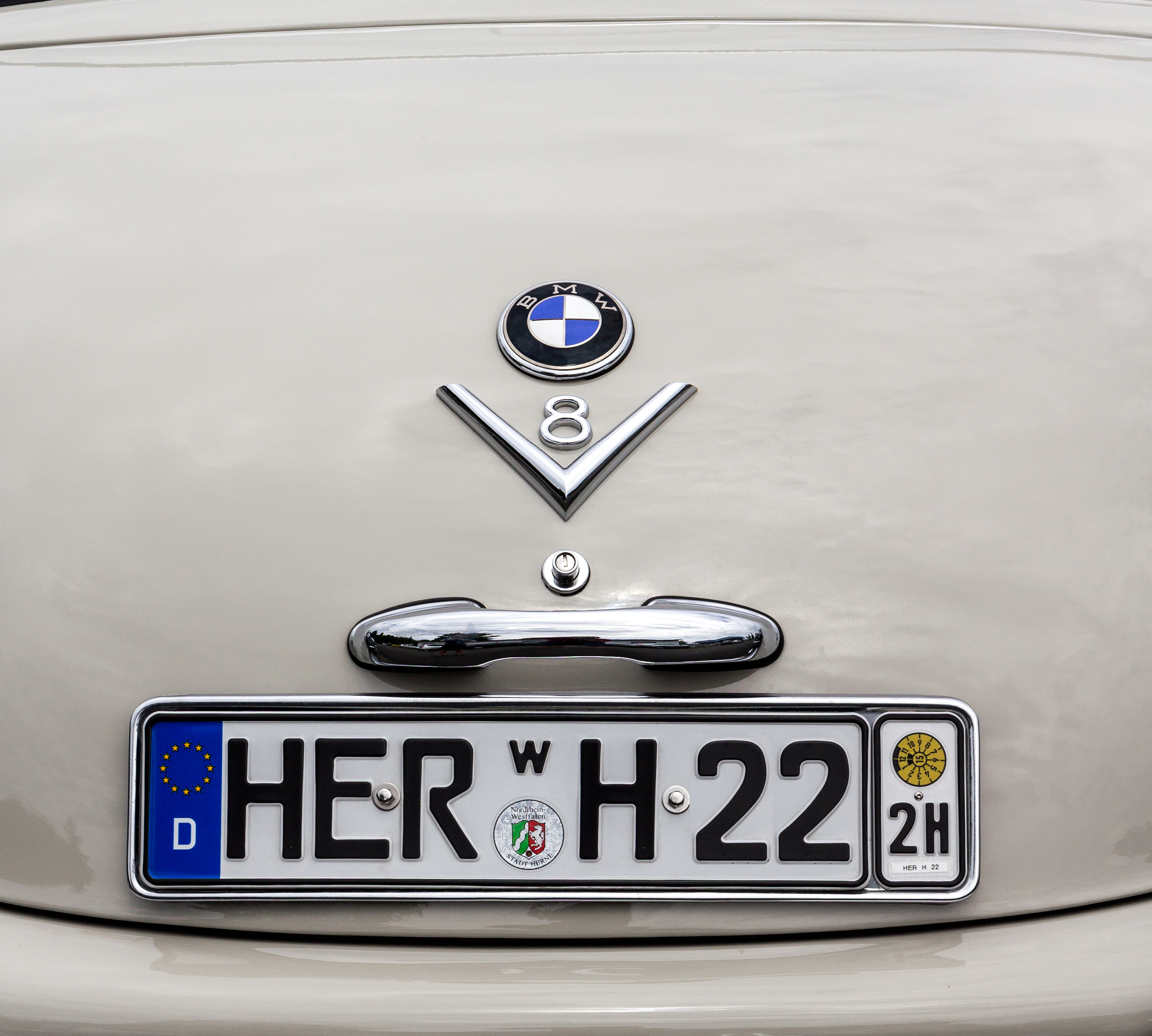
Car with a combination of interchangeable and historic plate

== History ==
=== German Empire and Weimar Republic ===
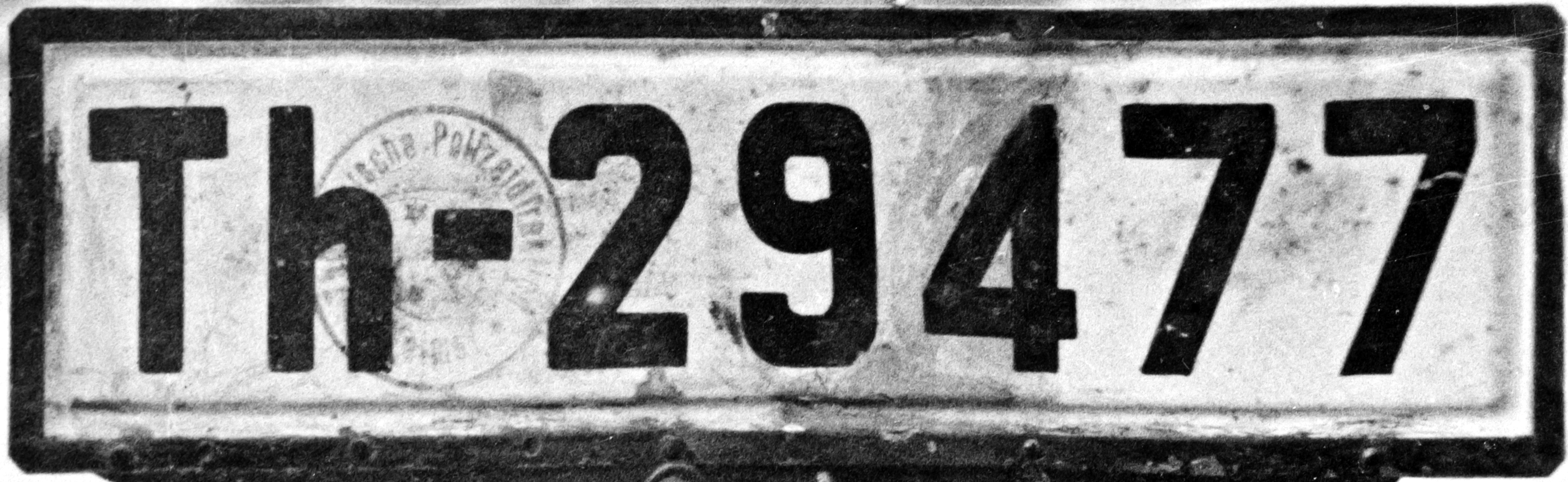
Licence plate from Thuringia (1930s)

The first German licence plates that had a lettering plan were issued from 1906 onwards. The various states and realms which made up the German Empire used different prefixes, such as Roman numerals (I representing Prussia, II Bavaria, III Württemberg, etc.) or plain letters (HH for Hansestadt Hamburg, e.g.). Larger states added further identifiers for their provinces or regions. Saxony did not use any statewide numeral and only used Roman numerals for its provinces.

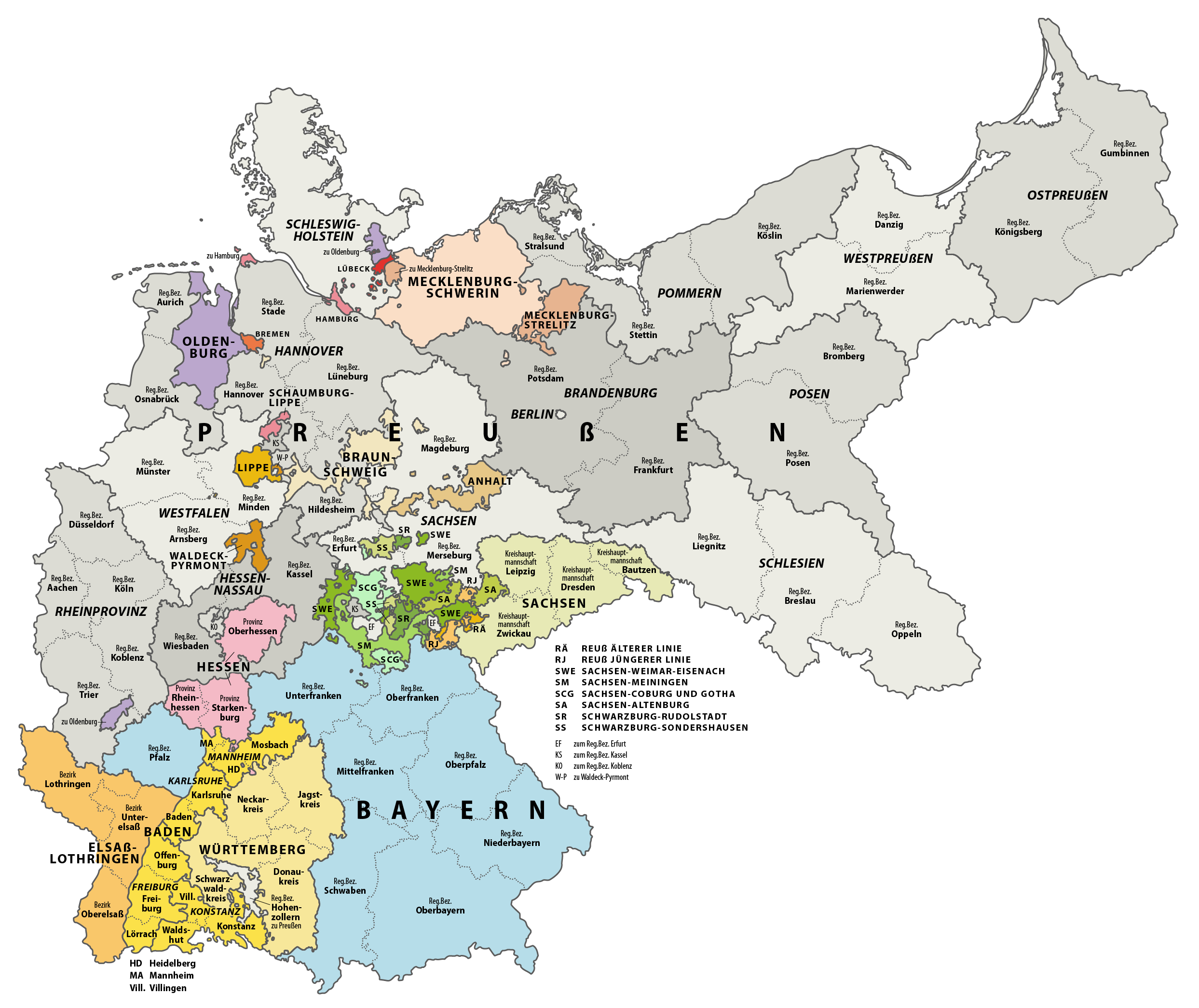
German Empire (1871–1918)

Weimar Republic (1918–1933)

List of codes on German licence plates (1906–1945)
| Code | Country / province / district | | Notes |
|---|---|---|---|
| I ... | Prussia | Preußen | |
| I A | Berlin | | |
| I B | Posen-West Prussia | Provinz Posen-Westpreußen | 1922–1938 |
| I C | Province of East Prussia | Provinz Ostpreußen | |
| I D | Province of West Prussia | Provinz Westpreußen | 1906–1922 then merged into Posen-West Prussia |
| I E | Province of Brandenburg | Provinz Brandenburg | |
| I H | Province of Pomerania | Provinz Pommern | |
| I K | Province of Silesia | Provinz Schlesien | |
| I L | Province of Hohenzollern | Hohenzollernsche Lande | |
| I M | Province of Saxony | Provinz Sachsen | |
| I P | Province of Schleswig-Holstein | Provinz Schleswig-Holstein | |
| I S | Province of Hanover | Provinz Hannover | |
| I T | Province of Hesse-Nassau | Provinz Hessen-Nassau | |
| I X | Province of Westphalia | Provinz Westfalen | |
| I Y | Province of Posen | Provinz Posen | 1906–1922 then merged into Posen-West Prussia |
| I Y | District of Düsseldorf | Regierungsbezirk Düsseldorf | 1928–1945 |
| I Z | Rhine Province | Rheinprovinz | excl. Bezirk Düsseldorf 1928–1945 |
| II ... | Kingdom of Bavaria | Königreich Bayern | 1906–1918 |
| II ... | Free State of Bavaria | Freistaat Bayern | 1918–1945 |
| II A | Munich City District | Stadtbezirk München | |
| II B | Upper Bavaria | Kreis Oberbayern | |
| II C | Lower Bavaria | Kreis Niederbayern | |
| II D | Circle of the Rhine | Kreis Pfalz | |
| II E | Upper Palatinate | Kreis Oberpfalz | |
| II H | Upper Franconia | Kreis Oberfranken | |
| II M | Bavarian Military | | 1910–1919 |
| II N | City of Nuremberg | Stadtbezirk Nürnberg | incl. Fürth |
| II P | Post | | 1910–1923 |
| II S | Middle Franconia | Kreis Mittelfranken | |
| II U | Lower Franconia | Kreis Unterfranken | |
| II Z | Swabia | Kreis Schwaben | |
| III ... | Kingdom of Württemberg | Königreich Württemberg | 1906–1918 |
| III ... | Free People's State of Württemberg | Freier Volksstaat Württemberg | 1918–1945 |
| III A | Neckarkreis: Stuttgart City | | |
| III C | Neckarkreis: Oberämter Backnang, Besigheim, Brackenheim, Cannstatt, Esslingen | | |
| III D | Neckarkreis: Oberämter Heilbronn, Leonberg, Ludwigsburg, Marbach, Maulbronn | | |
| III E | Neckarkreis: Oberämter Neckarsulm, Oberamt Stuttgart, Vaihingen, Waiblingen, Weinsberg | | |
| III H | Schwarzwaldkreis: Oberämter Balingen, Calw, Freudenstadt, Herrenberg, Horb, Nagold | | |
| III K | Schwarzwaldkreis: Oberämter Neuenburg, Nürtingen, Oberndorf, Reutlingen, Rottenburg | | |
| III M | Schwarzwaldkreis: Oberämter Rottweil, Spaichingen, Sulz, Tübingen, Tuttlingen, Urach | | |
| III P | Jagstkreis: Oberämter Aalen, Crailsheim, Ellwangen, Gaildorf, Gerabronn | | |
| III S | Jagstkreis: Oberämter Gmünd, Hall, Heidenheim, Künzelsau | | |
| III T | Jagstkreis: Oberämter Mergentheim, Neresheim, Öhringen, Schorndorf, Welzheim | | |
| III X | Donaukreis: Oberämter Biberach, Blaubeuren, Ehingen, Geislingen, Göppingen, Kirchheim | | |
| III Y | Donaukreis: Oberämter Laupheim, Leutkirch, Münsingen, Ravensburg, Riedlingen | | |
| III Z | Donaukreis: Oberämter Saulgau, Tettnang, Ulm, Waldsee, Wangen | | |
| III WP | Württembergische Post | | 1912–1923 |
| | Kingdom of Saxony | Königreich Sachsen | 1906–1918 |
| | Free State of Saxony | Freistaat Sachsen | 1918–1945 |
| I | Kreishauptmannschaft Bautzen; Kreishauptmannschaft Dresden-Bautzen | | 1906–1932; 1932–1945 |
| II | Kreishauptmannschaft Dresden; Kreishauptmannschaft Dresden-Bautzen | | 1906–1932; 1932–1945 |
| III | Kreishauptmannschaft Leipzig | | |
| IV | Kreishauptmannschaft Chemnitz | | |
| V | Kreishauptmannschaft Zwickau and police authorities (Polizeiämter) Zwickau and Plauen | | |
| IV ... | Grand Duchy of Baden | Großherzogtum Baden | 1906–1918 |
| IV ... | Republic of Baden | Republik Baden | 1918–1945 |
| IV B | Baden | | |
| V ... | Grand Duchy of Hesse | Großherzogtum Hessen | 1906–1918 |
| V ... | People's State of Hesse | Volksstaat Hessen | 1918–1945 |
| V O | Province of Upper Hesse | Provinz Oberhessen | 1906–1937 |
| V R | Province of Rhenish Hesse | Provinz Rheinhessen | 1906–1937 |
| V S | Province of Starkenburg | Provinz Starkenburg | 1906–1937 |
| V H | People's State of Hesse | Volksstaat Hessen | 1937–1945 |
| VI ... | Alsace-Lorraine | Reichsland Elsaß-Lothringen | 1906–1918 |
| VI A | Lower Alsace | Bezirk Unterelsaß | 1906–1918 |
| VI B | Upper Alsace | Bezirk Oberelsaß | 1906–1918 |
| VI C | Lorraine | Bezirk Lothringen | 1906–1918 |
Further states and realms
| Code | Country / province / district | | Notes |
| A | Duchy of Anhalt | Herzogtum Anhalt | 1906–1918 |
| A | Free State of Anhalt | Freistaat Anhalt | 1918–1945 |
| B | Duchy of Brunswick | Herzogtum Braunschweig | 1906–1918 |
| B | Free State of Brunswick | Freistaat Braunschweig | 1918–1945 |
| CG | Duchy of Saxe-Coburg and Gotha | Herzogtum Sachsen-Coburg und Gotha | 1906–1918 |
| CG | Free State of Gotha | Freistaat Gotha | 1918–1920 then merged into Thuringia |
| CG | Free State of Coburg | Freistaat Coburg | 1918–1920 then united with Bavaria |
| HB | Hansestadt Bremen | | |
| HH | Hansestadt Hamburg | | |
| HL | Hansestadt Lübeck | | 1906–1937 |
| L | Hansestadt Lübeck | | 1903–1906 |
| L | Principality of Lippe | Fürstentum Lippe | 1906–1918 |
| L | Free State of Lippe | Freistaat Lippe | 1918–1945 |
| M | Mecklenburg | | 1934–1945 |
| M I | Grand Duchy of Mecklenburg-Schwerin | Großherzogtum; Mecklenburg-Schwerin | 1906–1918 |
| M I | Free State of Mecklenburg-Schwerin | Freistaat; Mecklenburg-Schwerin | 1918–1934 then merged into Mecklenburg |
| M II | Grand Duchy of Mecklenburg-Strelitz | Großherzogtum; Mecklenburg-Strelitz | 1906–1918 |
| M II | Free State of Mecklenburg-Strelitz | Freistaat Mecklenburg-Strelitz | 1918–1934 then merged into Mecklenburg |
| O I | Grand Duchy of Oldenburg | Großherzogtum Oldenburg | 1906–1918 |
| O I | Free State of Oldenburg | Freistaat Oldenburg | 1918–1945 |
| O II | Oldenburg, Lübeck exclave | Landesteil Lübeck | 1906–1937 then merged into Schleswig-Holstein |
| O III | Oldenburg, Birkenfeld exclave | Landesteil Birkenfeld | 1906–1937 then merged into Rhine Province |
| RA | Reuss Elder Line | Reuß älterer Linie | 1906–1920 then merged into Thuringia |
| RJ | Reuss Younger Line | Reuß jüngerer Linie | 1906–1920 then merged into Thuringia |
| S | Saxe-Weimar-Eisenach | Großherzogtum / Freistaat; Sachsen-Weimar-Eisenach | 1906–1920 then merged into Thuringia |
| SA | Saxe-Altenburg | Herzogtum / Freistaat; Sachsen-Altenburg | 1906–1920 then merged into Thuringia |
| SAAR | Saar Basin | Saargebiet | 1920–1935 |
| Saar | Saarland | | 1935–1945 |
| SL | Schaumburg-Lippe | Fürstentum / Freistaat; Schaumburg-Lippe | 1906–1945 |
| SM | Saxe-Meiningen | Herzogtum / Freistaat; Sachsen-Meiningen | 1906–1920 then merged into Thuringia |
| SR | Schwarzburg-Rudolstadt | Fürstentum / Freistaat; Schwarzburg-Rudolstadt | 1906–1920 then merged into Thuringia |
| SS | Schwarzburg-Sondershausen | Fürstentum / Freistaat; Schwarzburg-Sondershausen | 1906–1920 then merged into Thuringia |
| T | Thuringia | Thüringen | 1920–1922 |
| Th | Thuringia | Thüringen | 1922–1945 |
| W | Waldeck | Fürstentum / Freistaat; Waldeck und Pyrmont | 1906–1929 then merged into Hessen-Nassau |

During World War I the German Army was assigned the combination MK for Militärkraftwagen des Deutschen Heeres, military vehicle of the German Army. After the war, during the Weimar Republic, the German Army used RW for Reichswehr. Beyond this, there were no significant changes after the overthrow of the German monarchy.

=== Nazi Germany ===
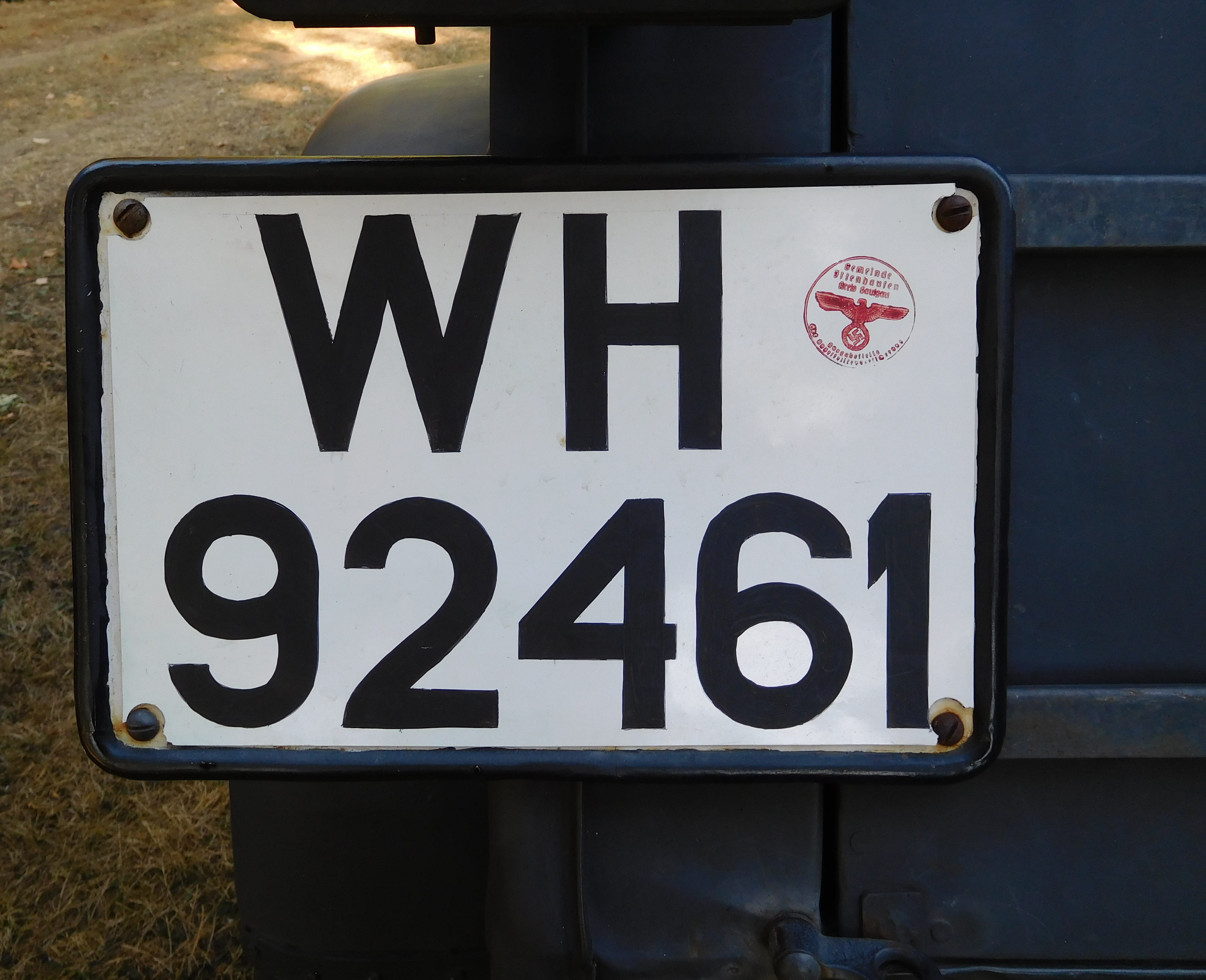
Army vehicle

During the Nazi regime (1933–1945), the system of licence plates was basically continued. New combinations were issued for nationwide institutions or organisations, such as DR (Deutsche Reichsbahn) for the railway authority, WH Wehrmacht Heer, WL Wehrmacht Luftwaffe, WM Wehrmacht Kriegsmarine and WT Wehrmacht Straßentransportdienst for the military, or POL for the police.

While the Nazi state expanded and waged war, their bureaucrats applied their systems, including licence plates, to occupied countries or territories. Thus, plates of similar style were introduced in Austria, on Czech and Polish territory, in Alsace and Lorraine, and beyond.

=== Postwar Germany ===
Occupation zones of Germany, 8 Jun 1947 - 22 Apr 1949

After 1945, however, the victorious allied forces abolished the system of German licence plates and instead assigned new lettering combinations in their respective occupation zones. Although each nation implemented their own ideas initially, a system for all four zones was introduced by 1949. At first, the different zones were distinguishable by the first letter prefix A, B, F or S standing for the American, British, French or Soviet occupation zone, respectively. A second letter below indicated the area or country in question, such as ^{A}_{B} stood for American zone/Bavaria. This area code was followed by a two-digit number signifying the district and another number counting within that area. When the numbers became scarce after some years, another zone prefix (e. g. without the first letter) would be introduced additionally.

The city of Berlin had a special status and, consequentially, special plates. Having abolished the old I A number plates in 1945, the Soviet occupation forces issued plates with Cyrillic characters at first. Motorcycles were issued БM (=BM, 1945–1946) and ГM (GM, 1945–1947). Cars, lorries and buses received ГФ (=GF, 1945–1946) and БГ (=BG, 1945–1947). These were replaced on the insistence of the western powers, first to KB for Kommandatura Berlin and, in the Eastern part of the city, to GB in 1948.

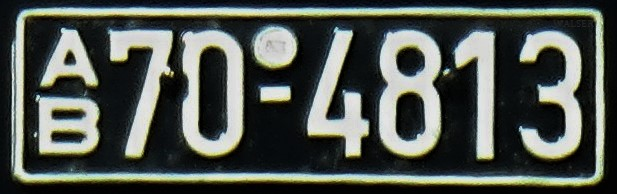
Licence plate from Bavaria, American occupation zone

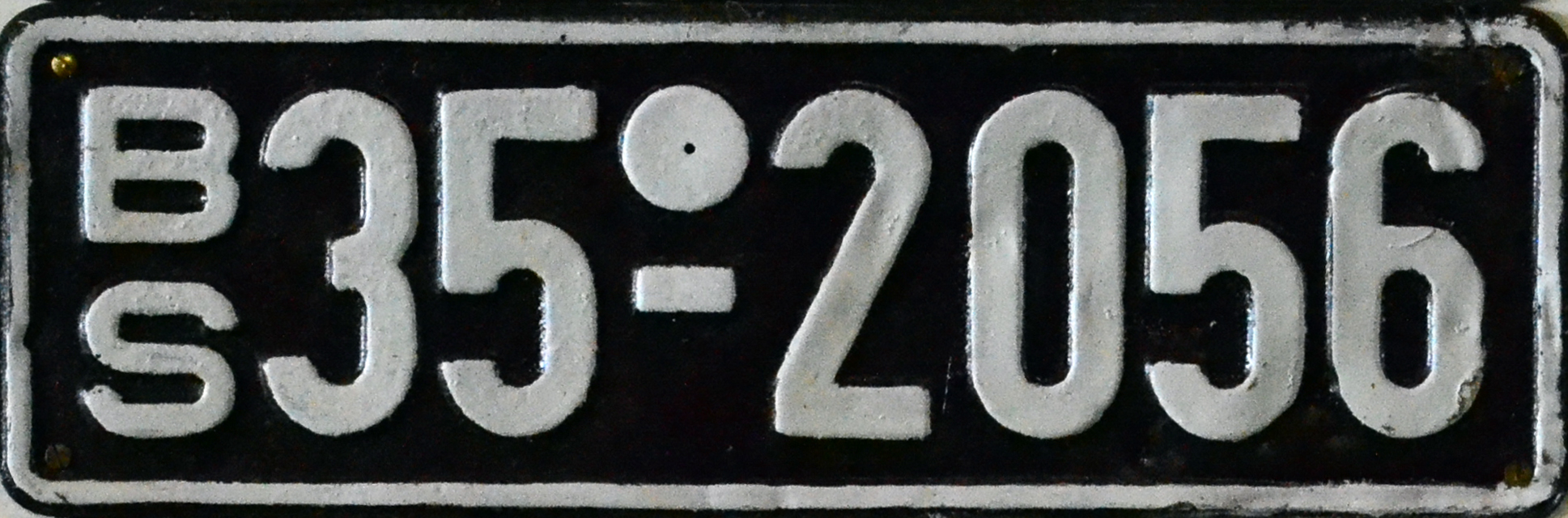
Licence plate from Schleswig-Holstein, British occupation zone

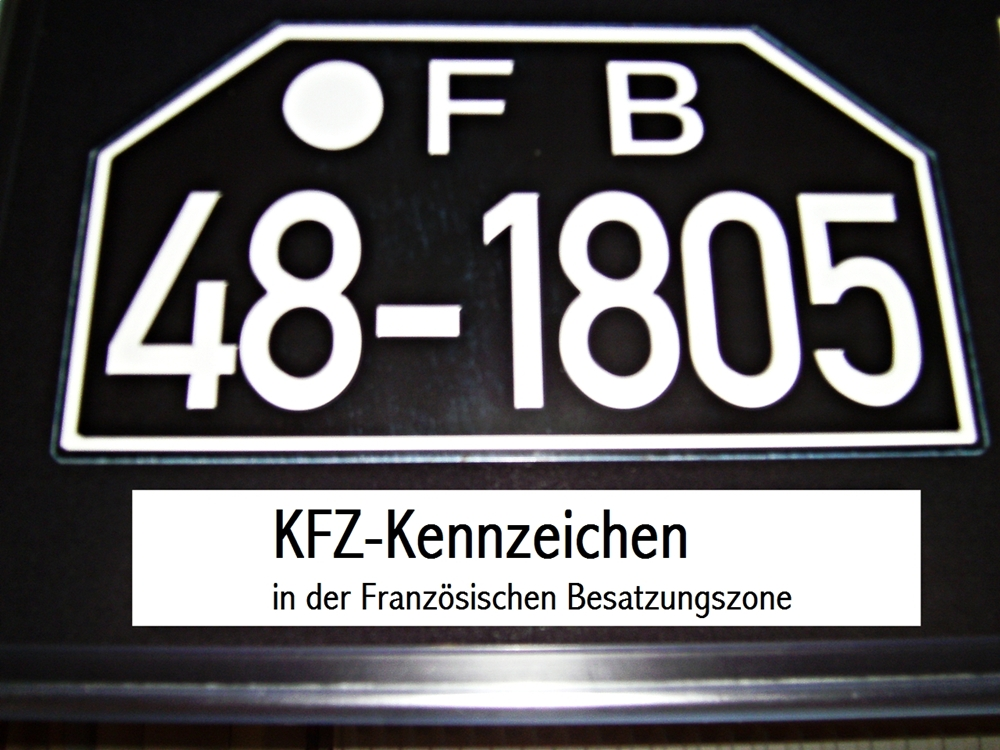
Licence plate from Baden, French occupation zone (motorcycle format)

Licence plate from Saxony, (Note: Saxony was abbreviated L for Leipzig, to avoid infamous SS.) Soviet occupation zone

==== Vehicles of occupation/NATO forces ====
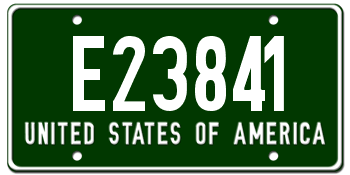
Occupation 1947 licence plate

The British Army of the Rhine (BAOR), initially occupation forces, later NATO elements, issued servicemen with plates carrying white letters and numerals on a black background for their personal vehicles. These cars stood out in comparison to the black on white German plates, and following the terrorist murder of a British serviceman, identified when returning to his car with BAOR licence plates, servicemen had to opt for their cars to carry either UK plates (generally right-hand drive vehicles) or German plates (generally left-hand drive vehicles). During the time that Belgian forces were stationed in West Germany, white on black plates similar to the BAOR plates were used.

==== US Forces vehicles ====
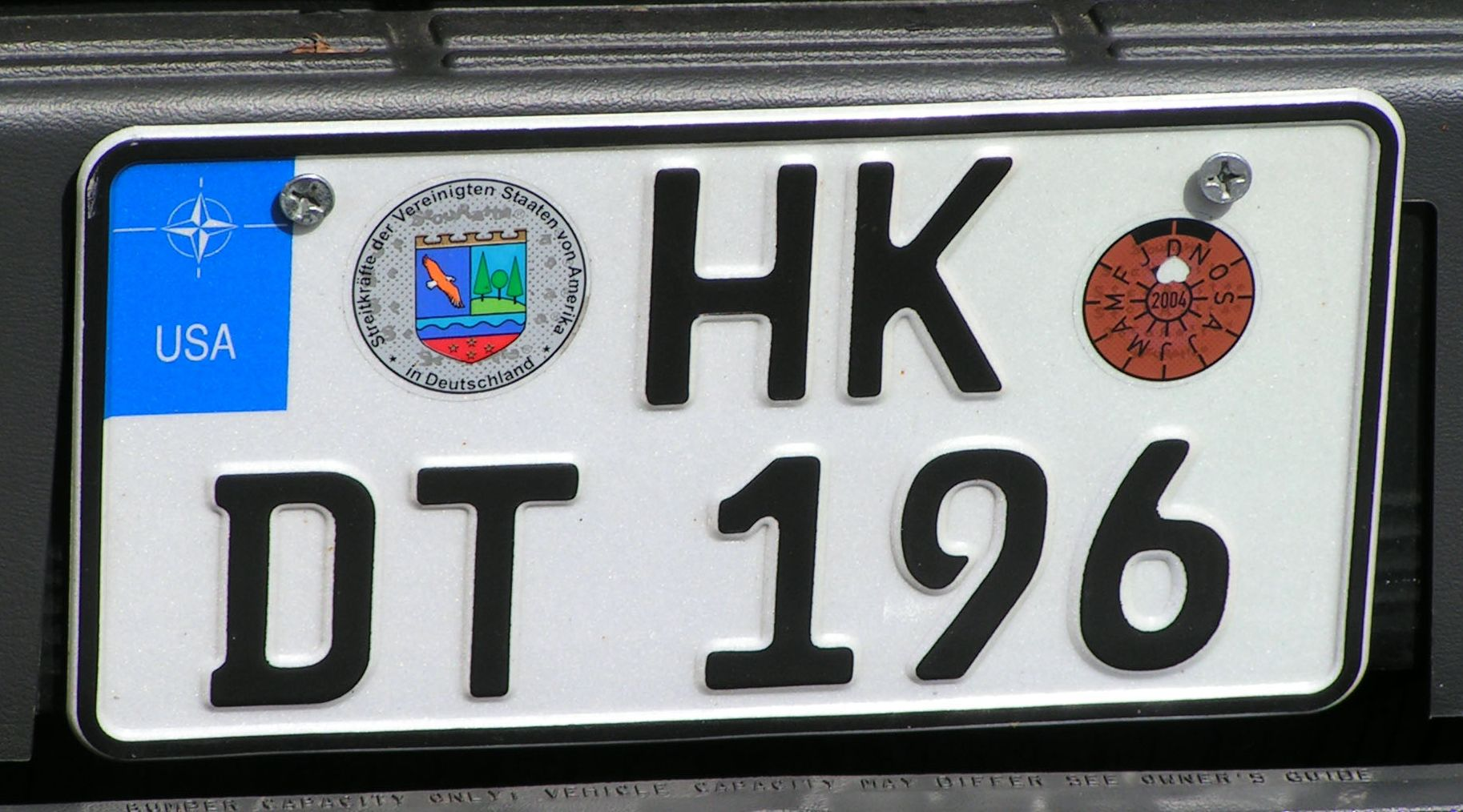
"HK" number plate

The American Forces have tried to "blend in" their servicepersons′ private vehicles in another way. Starting in 2000, they adopted a type of license plates which closely resembled the German plates yet bore area codes which were at that time not assigned to any district, i.e. AD, AF and HK, (Note: HK has meanwhile been assigned to Heidekreis.) later also IF and QQ. These codes still stood out, especially as they bore the NATO symbol instead of the EU's circle of stars and the registration seal candidly read Streitkräfte der Vereinigten Staaten von Amerika instead of, e.g. Bayern, Landratsamt Neustadt a.d. Waldnaab. Since 2006, the vehicles in question bear license plates with regular German area codes, generally referring to the district of their official stationing.

=== East Germany, DDR ===
The German Democratic Republic issued their own style of licence plates beginning in 1953. The first letter would indicate the Bezirk (administrative district (Note: Any GDR Bezirk consisted of several Kreise and was much larger than the unit described as district elsewhere on this page.)) where the vehicle was registered. These initials, however, did not refer to the name of the Bezirk but were distributed almost alphabetically from North to South.

Districts (Bezirke) of the GDR

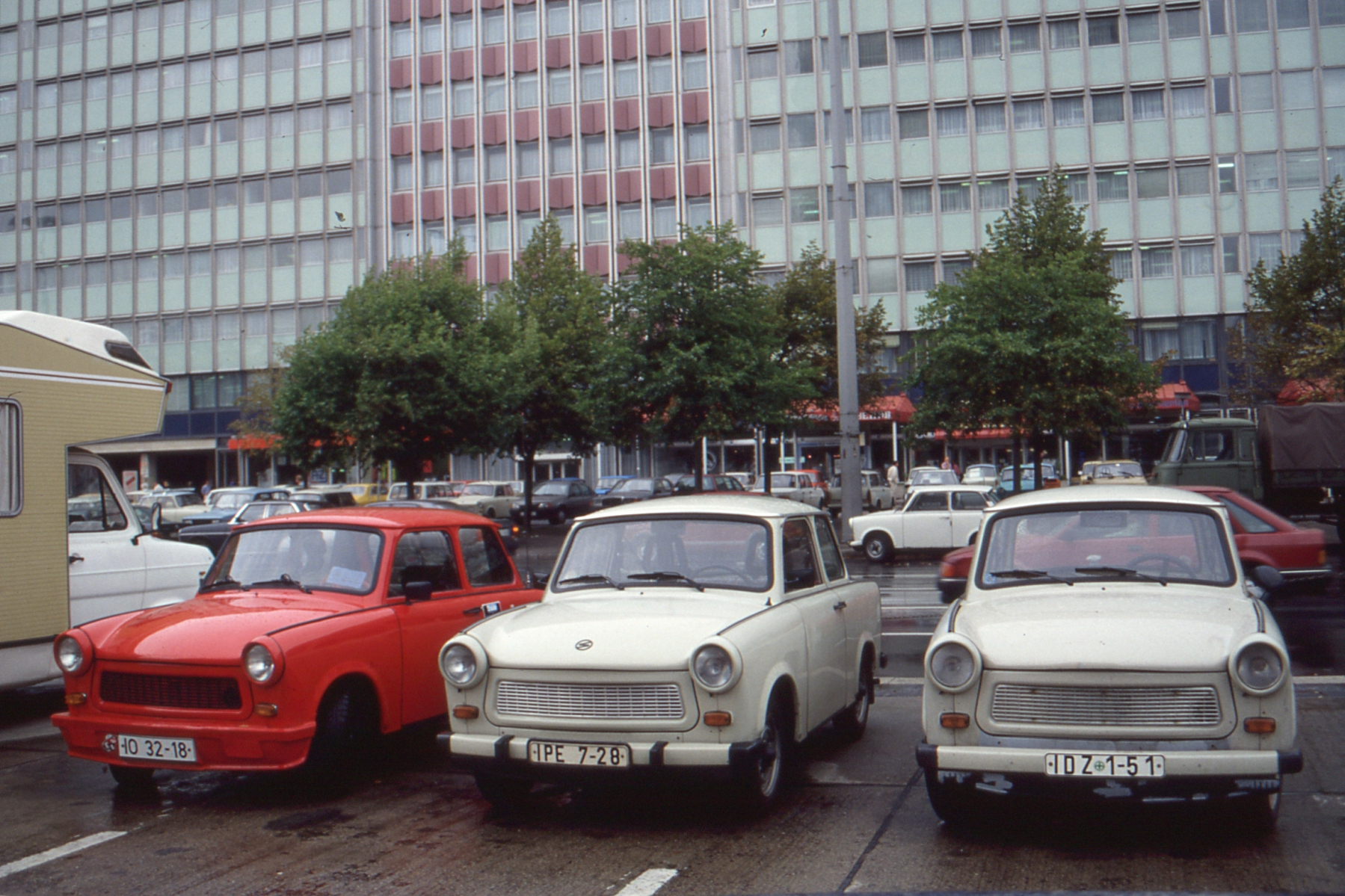
3 Trabants with East Berlin licence plates. The red car bears a plate in the "Western" typeface.

| Prefix | Bezirk |
|---|---|
| A | Rostock |
| B | Schwerin |
| C | Neubrandenburg |
| D | Potsdam |
| P | Potsdam |
| E | Frankfurt (Oder) |
| H | Magdeburg |
| M | Magdeburg |
| I | Berlin Hauptstadt der DDR |
| K | Halle |
| V | Halle |
| L | Erfurt |
| F | Erfurt |
| N | Gera |
| O | Suhl |
| R | Dresden |
| Y | Dresden |
| S | Leipzig |
| U | Leipzig |
| T | Karl-Marx-Stadt |
| X | Karl-Marx-Stadt |
| VA | Volksarmee (Armed Forces) |
| ^{V}_{P} | Volkspolizei (Police) |
| Z | Cottbus |

After German reunification in 1990, the DDR plates were soon abolished and the West German system introduced, starting in 1991 and completed in 1993. Even before this transition phase, it could be observed that licence plates in GDR scheme were produced with West German typeface on the respective machinery.

=== West Germany ===
In July 1956 the current system was introduced in then West Germany, replacing the post-war system. The occupation zones were no longer referred to, instead the new system based on the districts of Germany. Each of these was assigned an alphabetic code which had its origin in the name of the district, i.e. of the city or of the capital of the rural district. Quite often, a "district-free" city was surrounded by, or adjacent to a rural district of the same name. In this case, they would both share the code as well as the name, yet devise a way how to split the possible alphanumerical combinations.

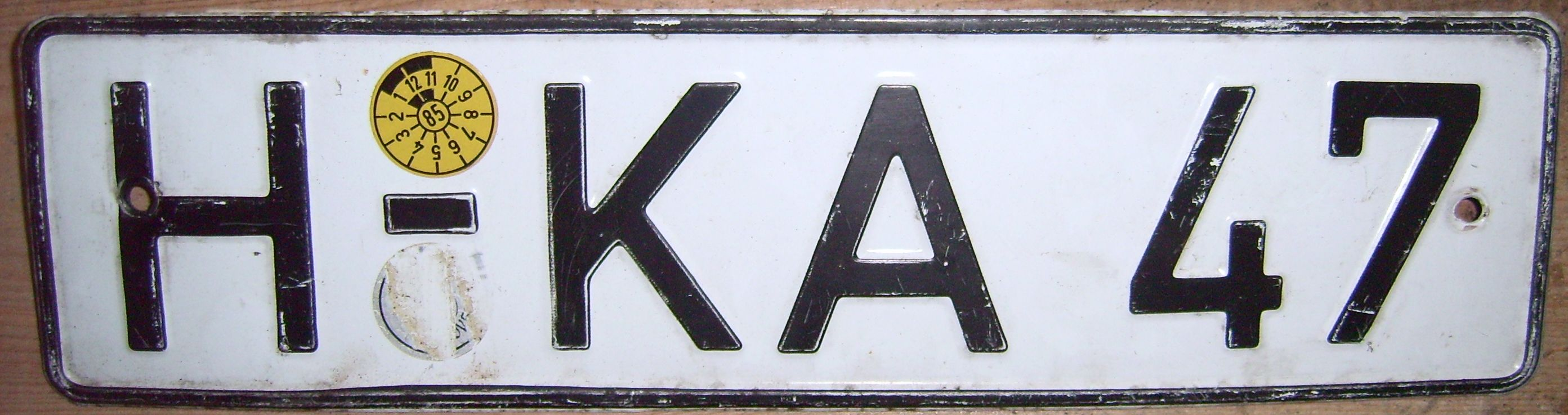
Number plate in the 1956 style, from Hannover

The number of letters in the area code hints at the size of the district. The basic idea was to even out the number of characters on all licence plates, because the most populous districts would have more cars and, consequently, more digits after the prefix. The largest German cities generally only have one-letter codes, such as B=Berlin, M=Munich (München), K=Cologne (Köln), F=Frankfurt, S=Stuttgart, H=Hannover. Therefore, cities or districts with fewer letters are generally assumed to be bigger and more important whereas three-letter codes tend to be regarded as rural and dull. Reflecting that, most districts aimed for a combination with fewer letters for their prefix code.

The most significant exception of the one-letter code is Germany's second largest city Hamburg which bears HH for Hansestadt Hamburg, because of its historical membership in the Hanseatic League, reflected already in its prefix used between 1906 and 1945. A similar principle applies to Bremen and Bremerhaven, forming the state Free Hanseatic City of Bremen and sharing the common prefix HB (1906–1947, and again since 1956). Likewise, Hansestadt Lübeck received its former prefix HL, already used between 1906 and 1937 when its statehood was abolished.

The first drafts, however, had to be altered in a few cases. The district of Wittlich rejected the code WC, understandably, and received WIL instead. The code KZ, initially projected for Konstanz, was withdrawn fast, due to recent history, and replaced by KN. Neither were SA, SS or HJ considered to be issued. The code SD was projected for Stade and was finally altered into STD after protests from that district who did not want to bear the abbreviation of the Sicherheitsdienst.

When originally planned, the system included codes for districts in Eastern Germany which were to be reserved until reunification. That included the territory of the GDR as well as the territories annexed to Poland and the Soviet Union after World War II, which West Germany's government still claimed in that era until about 1970. When reunification came in 1990, the reserved codes (e.g. P for Potsdam) were indeed issued to East German districts in January 1991, often as originally planned and as they existed at that time.

==== First changes ====
Starting in the early 1970s, West German districts were extensively rearranged. In order to reduce their number and so simplify governance, different steps could be taken:

- city districts "swallowed" neighboring municipalities and thus grew. (Note: The city of Bielefeld incorporated the largest part of the eponymous rural district, almost doubling their population.)
- city districts lost their sovereignty and were integrated into the surrounding or neighbouring rural district. (Note: The district-free towns of Marktredwitz and Selb were merged into the district of Wunsiedel.)
- rural districts merged with one or several others, or were split up between neighbouring districts. (Note: The district of Springe split up into the districts of Hameln-Pyrmont, Hanover, Hildesheim and Schaumburg.)
- single municipalities were moved between districts, as was deemed appropriate or practical.

In each of these cases, the new districts had to be endowed with an area code. Again, various solutions were possible:

- the largest or most populous district bestowed its name and code upon the newly created unit. (Note: The urban district of Schwandorf (SAD) merged with the rural districts of Burglengenfeld (BUL), Nabburg (NAB), Neunburg (NEN) and Oberviechtach (OVI) into a new rural district of Schwandorf (SAD).)
- one former district gave its name and/or capital while another's area code was used for the new district. (Note: The Rheingaukreis (RÜD for Rüdesheim) and Untertaunuskreis (SWA for Bad Schwalbach) districts merged into Rheingau-Taunus-Kreis, choosing the area code RÜD but the capital Bad Schwalbach.)
- the new unit was given a new name yet continued to use an existing area code. (Note: The districts of Eschwege and Witzenhausen merged into Werra-Meißner-Kreis, using Eschwege's ESW and dropping WIZ.)
- the new unit was given a new name and created a new area code. (Note: The districts of Eiderstedt (TÖN for Tönning), Husum (HUS) and Südtondern (NIB for Niebüll) merged into Nordfriesland (NF).)

In any case, the adamant rule was that one area code per district was valid and would be issued to any vehicle registered henceforth. Existing registrations would remain valid until the vehicle was removed from this district to be either relocated or permanently deregistered. Another rule, however, was abolished. Whereas rural districts had generally been named after their capital town, it was now possible to create new names, applying to geographical (Note: The rural districts of Heidelberg (HD), Mannheim (MA) and part of Sinsheim (SNH) merged into Rhein-Neckar-Kreis (HD); the districts of Alsfeld (ALS) and Lauterbach (LAT) merged into Vogelsbergkreis (VB).) or historical features. (Note: Öhringen (ÖHR) and Künzelsau (KÜN) merged into Hohenlohekreis (KÜN).) As well it was possible to combine the names of the districts that had merged, either keeping one of their codes (Note: The rural districts of Straubing and Bogen merged to Straubing-Bogen, keeping SR (and sharing it with Straubing city district) while dropping Bogen's BOG.) or creating a new one. (Note: The rural districts of Koblenz and Mayen merged to Mayen-Koblenz, newly introducing MYK while dropping MY and leaving KO to the city of Koblenz.)

=== Germany reunited ===
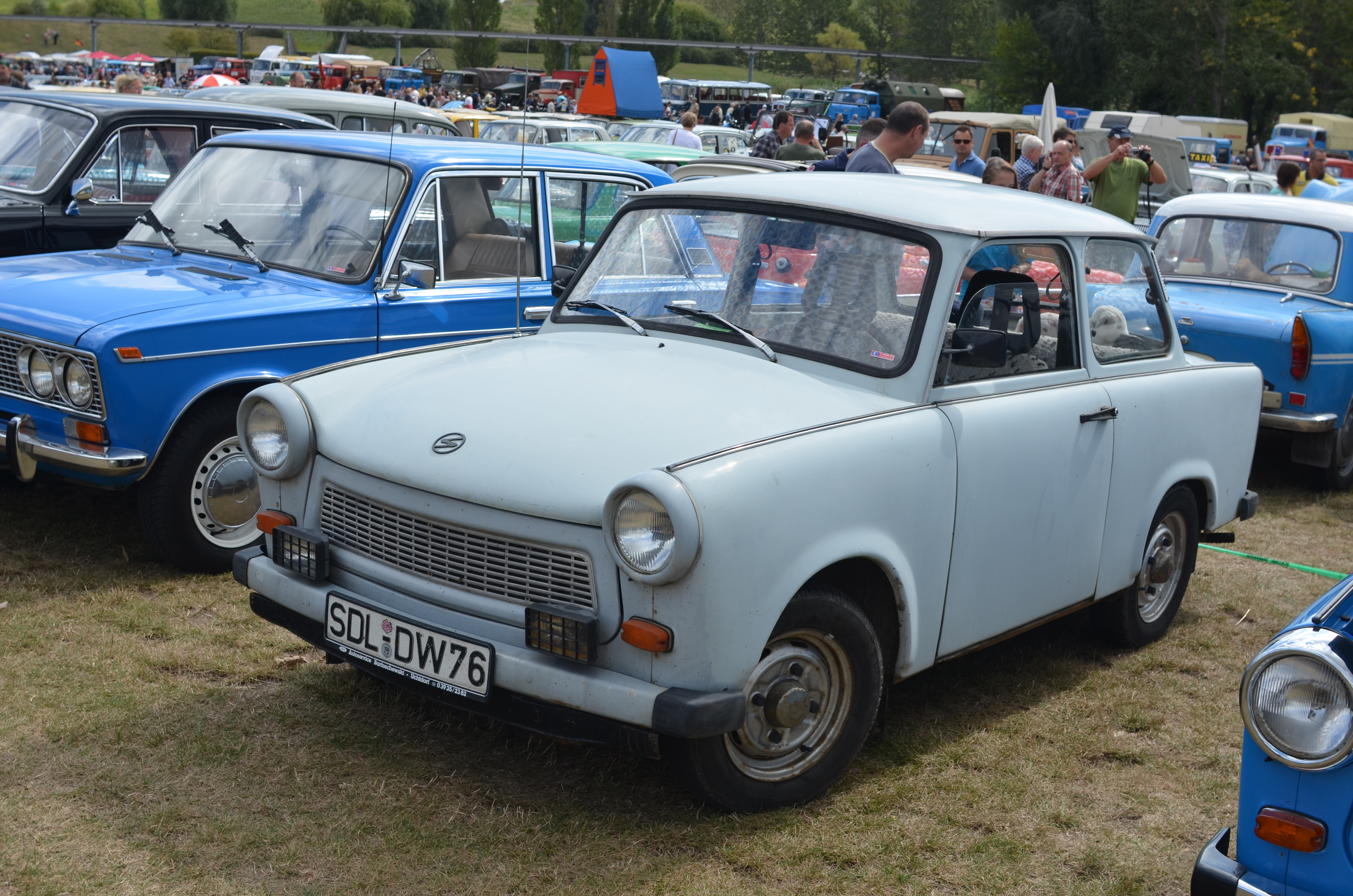
Trabant registered in Stendal; pre-1994 typeface (Note: With emission test sticker valid February 2011)

When the GDR ceased to exist and Germany was reunited in its present size on 3 October 1990, new area codes were issued to the East German districts. In many cases they could be taken from the old lists that had been prepared before 1956: P stood for Potsdam, EF for Erfurt, SON for Sonneberg. Yet, a considerable number of codes was altered, either because a code which had been reserved for a district in today's Poland or Russia had become available, (Note: DZ had once been reserved for Danzig but was now issued to Delitzsch.) or because the projected code had meanwhile been issued to a West German district. (Note: Gotha had been scheduled to receive GT, yet this code went to the newly-created district of Gütersloh in 1973. Gotha was given GTH instead.)

A prominent example of a reserved code being reused before reunification was one-letter L which was originally planned for Leipzig, by far the largest German city starting with L. However this code was given to the newly formed Hessian city of Lahn and the district Lahn-Dill-Kreis in 1977, as hopes for reunification faded away. After the rather unexpected reunification (and Lahn city having split up again and thus abolished in 1979), the L was returned to the city of Leipzig and Lahn-Dill-Kreis was issued LDK instead.

The letter G was first reserved for the East German city of Görlitz and later awarded to the city of Gera, although both are smaller than the West German Gelsenkirchen (GE). The area code ZK had been reserved, in the 1950s, for the city of Zwickau but was rejected as ZK had become the abbreviation of the loathed Zentralkomitee of the former Communist party SED.

In analogy to the three northwestern Hansestädte Hamburg, Bremen and Lübeck, but without historical examples of formerly issued prefixes, four northeastern Hanseatic cities, Greifswald, Rostock, Stralsund and Wismar, chose the prefixes HGW, HRO, HST and HWI. There were no suitable two-letter codes available since HG, HR, HS and HW were already taken by West German districts. (Note: HG = Hochtaunuskreis, capital: Bad Homburg vor der Höhe HR = Schwalm-Eder-Kreis, capital: Homberg HS = Kreis Heinsberg HW = Kreis Halle (Westfalen).)

Beginning in the mid-1990s, however, districts in East Germany were rearranged again, similar to the West two decades before. Thus many of these codes issued before were now outdated, but could still be seen alongside the new code. (Note: In Torgau-Oschatz district, merged in 1994, you might well see the new TO alongside Torgau's TG and Oschatz's OZ, at the same time.) This rearrangement was continued in a second step after 2000, which created large districts with a remarkable variety of possible area codes registered. Still, only one of these was the current one which would be issued to vehicles registered at the moment.

=== Liberalized registration rules ===
After the reorganization of districts, from the 1970s onward, many area codes expired and new ones were created at that time. However, number plates issued before these rearrangements remain valid, providing the vehicle is still in use and has not been reregistered since. So it was still possible, if rare, to see a classic car with registration codes of administrative units that have not existed for over 30 years. (Note: EIN = Einbeck, which was merged into Northeim in 1974.)

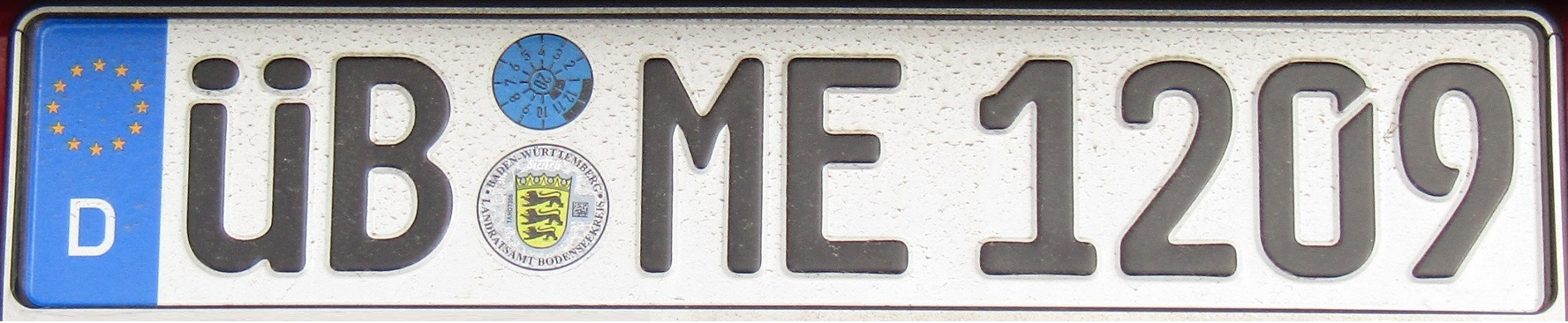
Überlingen licence plate, reintroduced in Bodenseekreis in 2020

A study conducted in 2010–12 produced the result that 72% of the German population would welcome the possibility to use again these abolished area codes whereas only 13% opposed the idea. It was regarded as remarkable that even young people who had never driven a car with such an "old" prefix favoured the idea of this so-called Kennzeichenliberalisierung (licence plate liberalization). For one, their chances at receiving a personalized license plate would improve if the aspired combination was available not once but several times within their district. Yet the main reason mentioned was a pride in their home town and their own roots, in times of globalization.

The police, however, warned against introducing further codes, as it had turned out that observant citizens would easily notice a car with a number plate from a distant district, thus assisting the police in solving crimes. Plates from the vicinity, on the other hand, would be easier to remember in full, and this would also help to find offenders. More opposition came from local politicians who maintained they had at last succeeded in unifying their merged districts and healed the wounds of those inhabitants who had to give up "their" prefix. If that prefix was available again, they feared, it might lead to old feuds within districts flaming up anew – or, as the district of Westerwaldkreis put it, "reopen the old trenches between former Oberwesterwaldkreis (WEB) and former Unterwesterwaldkreis (MT)."

Nonetheless, the Federal Ministry of Transport complied with the majority of citizens. Beginning in November 2012 in some districts, and meanwhile nationwide, most of these expired prefix codes have been reintroduced, e.g. in the district of Wesel, it has again become possible to register vehicles with MO as used for the former district of Moers and DIN as used for the former district of Dinslaken, additionally to the standard WES which had been the only code issued since 1975. As of September 2024, the liberalization has led to 328 previously abolished codes being reintroduced.

In 2024, the same college which had initiated this movement suggested a second step. Every town above 20,000 inhabitants should be able to apply for their own code, even if they had never had one and were subordinate municipalities of a district. The reactions by the political bodies responsible for an implementation of this idea were restrained but varied.

=== Slackening of rules ===
Furthermore, it has become possible to "take one's number along", i.e. to keep a licence plate issued at the previous address after moving away from that district. For that reason, the area code and the respective state seal on a licence plate do not necessarily mean that the vehicle's owner really lives there.

In 2023, the city of Munich applied for a second code, as the remaining free combinations with M, which the city has to share with the district of Munich, were becoming scarce. The code MUC, which is also the IATA code for Munich Airport, was granted by the Federal government on 21 September.

== Insurance plates ==
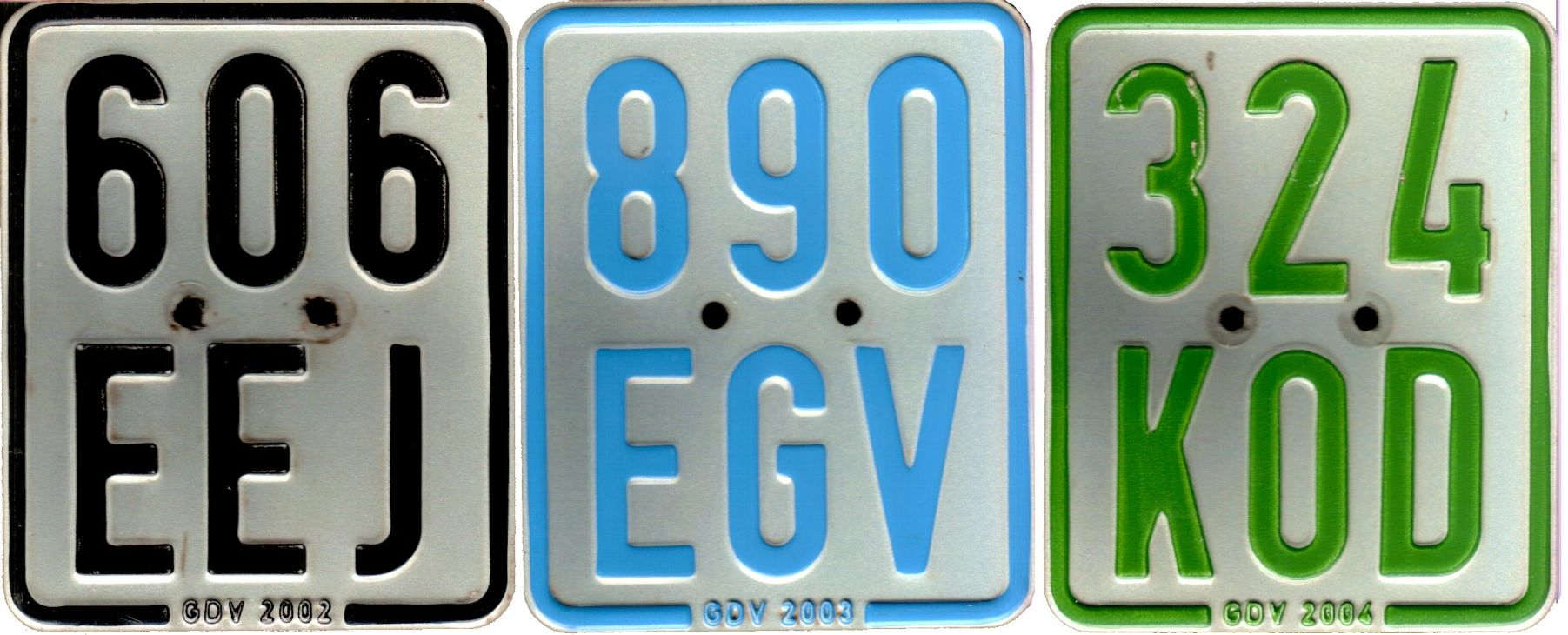
Insurance plates; the colour of the letters alternates yearly.

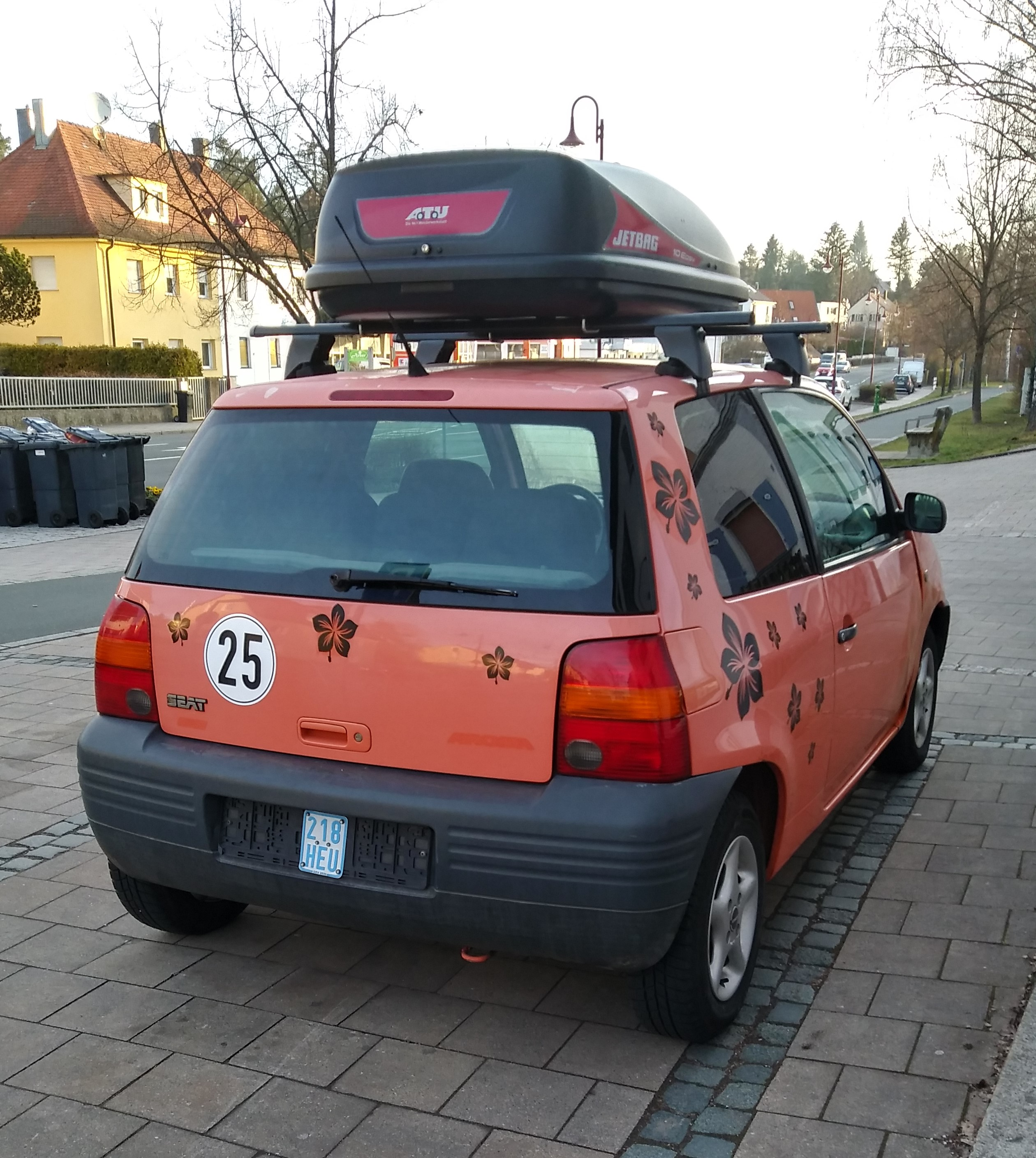
Car with maximum speed reduced to 25 km/h (16 mph), hence using an insurance plate (Note: Additionally, the white sticker reading "25" signals low speed to following drivers.)

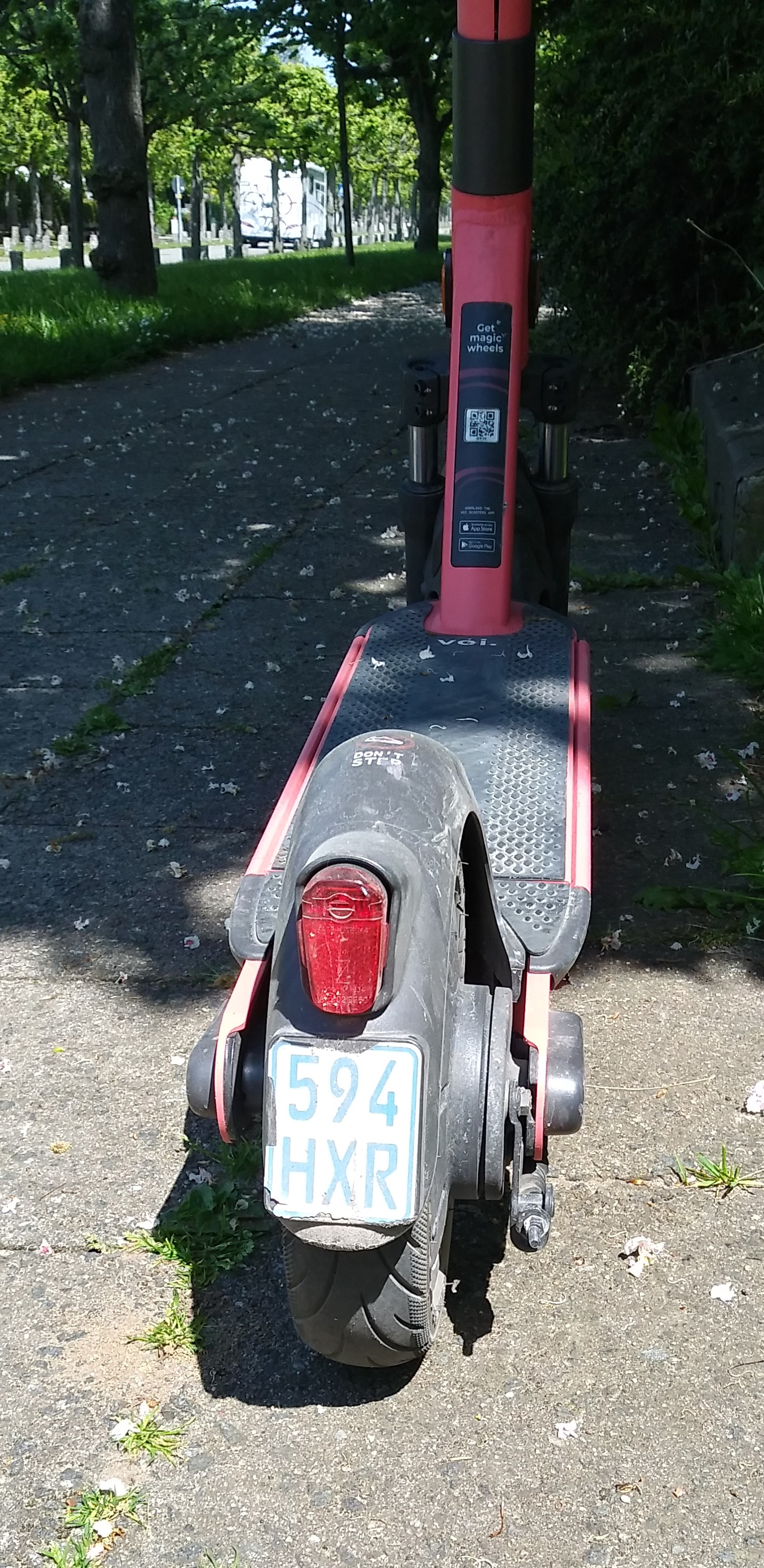
E-Scooter

Light motorised vehicles such as mopeds, motorized wheelchairs and other small, low-power vehicles (such as vehicles for the physically handicapped, with a maximum speed of 50 km/h (31 mph)) are required to have a registration plate of a different kind. This Versicherungskennzeichen (insurance plate) uses a system of three digits on the top and three letters beneath. Both numbers and letters are chosen randomly so personalising the plates is not possible. Plates are much smaller (Note: Regular size 130 mm × 101 mm (5 1/8 in × 4 in); also available as sticker for e-scooters in 67 mm × 55 mm (2 5/8 in × 2 1/8 in)) than the plates for normal cars and are only valid for one year from 1 March until the end of February the following year. Those plates are sold by insurance companies, so the fee includes both the registration and the cost of one year's insurance for the vehicle. There are four colours used: black, blue, green for normal plates, and red for temporary use, such as testing (very rare). The first three colours alternate annually in order to make it easy to see whether the vehicle has the correct plate and insurance.

Colours of the insurance plates from 1 March onwards of each year
| Colour | Year | | | | | | | | | | | | | | |
|---|---|---|---|---|---|---|---|---|---|---|---|---|---|---|---|
| RAL 9005 (Tiefschwarz, Jet black) | 1990 | 1993 | 1996 | 1999 | 2002 | 2005 | 2008 | 2011 | 2014 | 2017 | 2020 | 2023 | 2026 | 2029 | 2032 |
| RAL 5012 (Lichtblau, Light blue) | 1991 | 1994 | 1997 | 2000 | 2003 | 2006 | 2009 | 2012 | 2015 | 2018 | 2021 | 2024 | 2027 | 2030 | 2033 |
| RAL 6010 (Grasgrün, Grass green) | 1992 | 1995 | 1998 | 2001 | 2004 | 2007 | 2010 | 2013 | 2016 | 2019 | 2022 | 2025 | 2028 | 2031 | 2034 |

== See also ==
- Liste aller Kfz-Kennzeichen der Bundesrepublik Deutschland List of all registration codes issued under the current registration system
- Liste der deutschen Kfz-Kennzeichen, die nicht mehr ausgegeben werden List of registration codes no longer issued
- Liste der deutschen Kfz-Kennzeichen (historisch) List of repealed registration codes
- Liste der Kfz-Kennzeichen in Deutschland List of registration codes currently issued
