= Heinrich von Bünau =

German statesman and historian

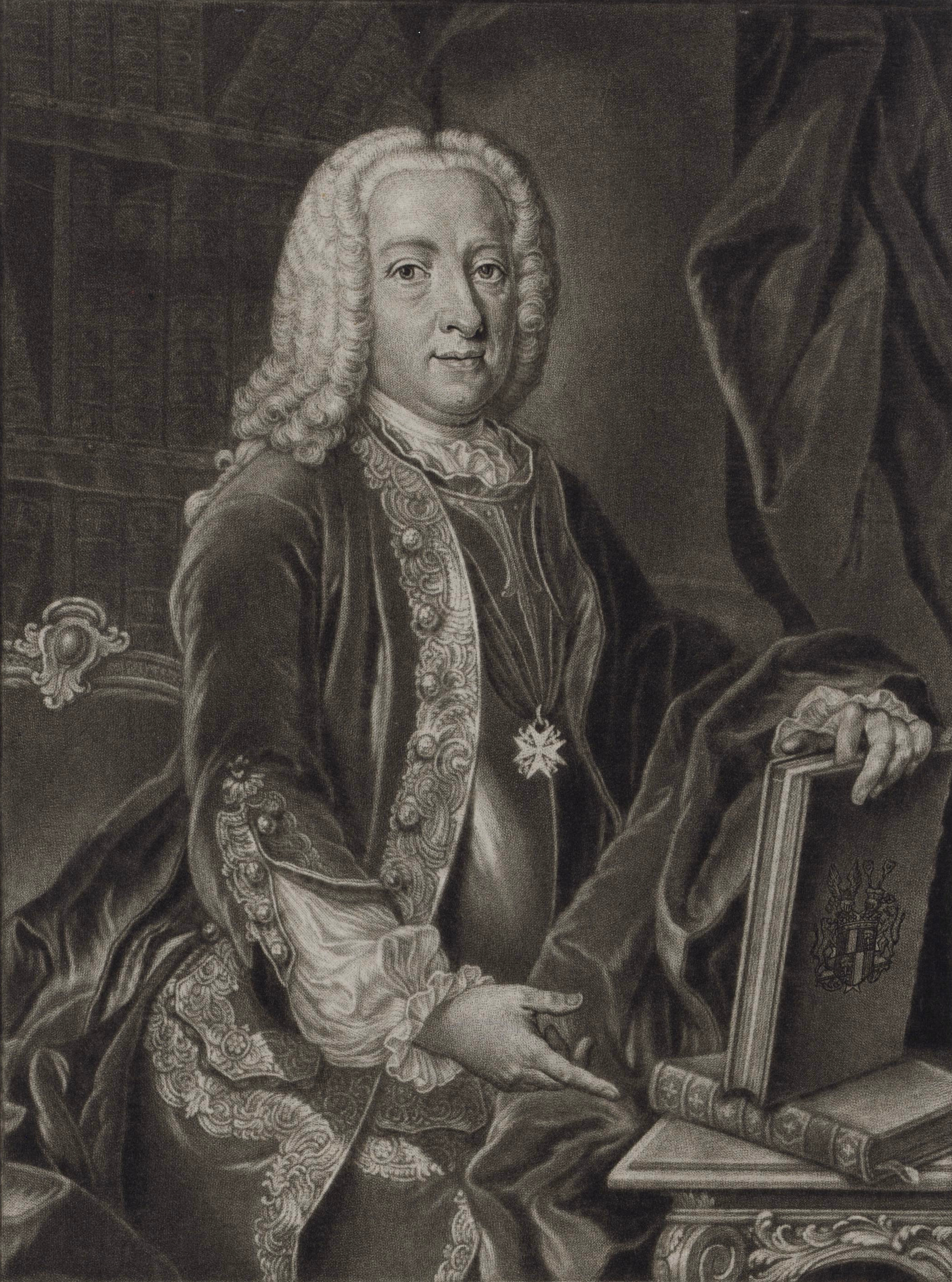

Guardian Governor of the Duchy of Saxe-Eisenach
- In office 1751–1756

Personal details
- Born: 2 June 1697 Weissenfels, Saxe-Eisenach
- Died: 7 April 1762 (aged 64) Ossmannstedt, Saxe-Weimar

Imperial Count Heinrich von Bünau (German: Heinrich Reichsgraf von Bünau; 2 June 1697 – 7 April 1762) was a politician and historian from the Electorate of Saxony, now part of Germany.

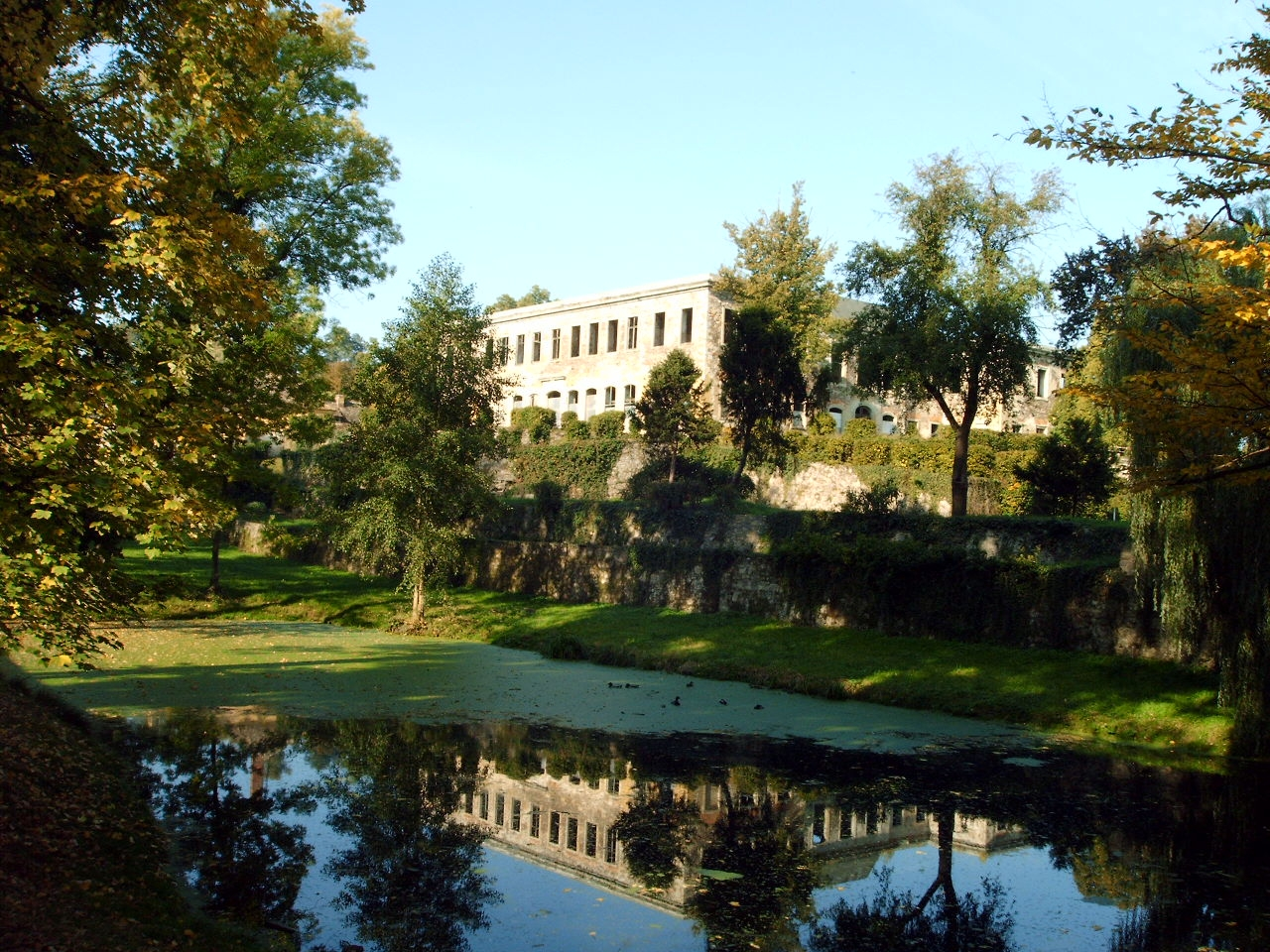
Dahlen Castle

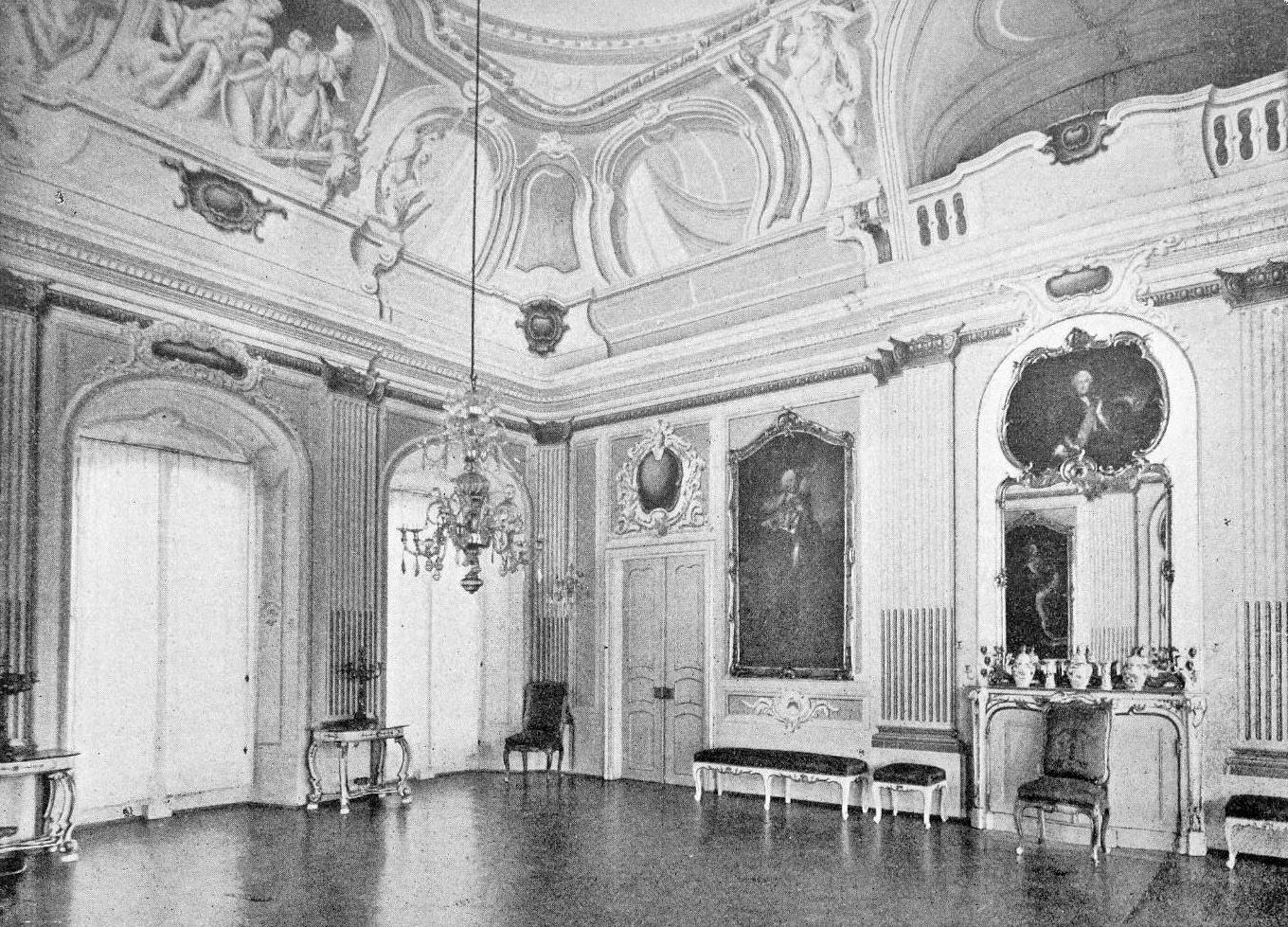
Dahlen Hall painted by Adam Friedrich Oeser in 1756.

== Life ==
Born in Weissenfels, Bünau was the son of Heinrich von Bünau (1665–1745), a Chancellor of the Electorate of Saxony who was created an Imperial Count of the Holy Roman Empire (Reichsgraf) on 24 March 1742 and his wife, Juliana Dorothea Dorothea von Geismar (1676-1745).

After studying at the University of Leipzig, Bünau entered the service of the Electors of Saxony and became an assessor in the Upper Court (Oberhofgericht) at Leipzig. Later he became Senior Consistory President and Privy Councillor (Wirklicher Geheimrat).

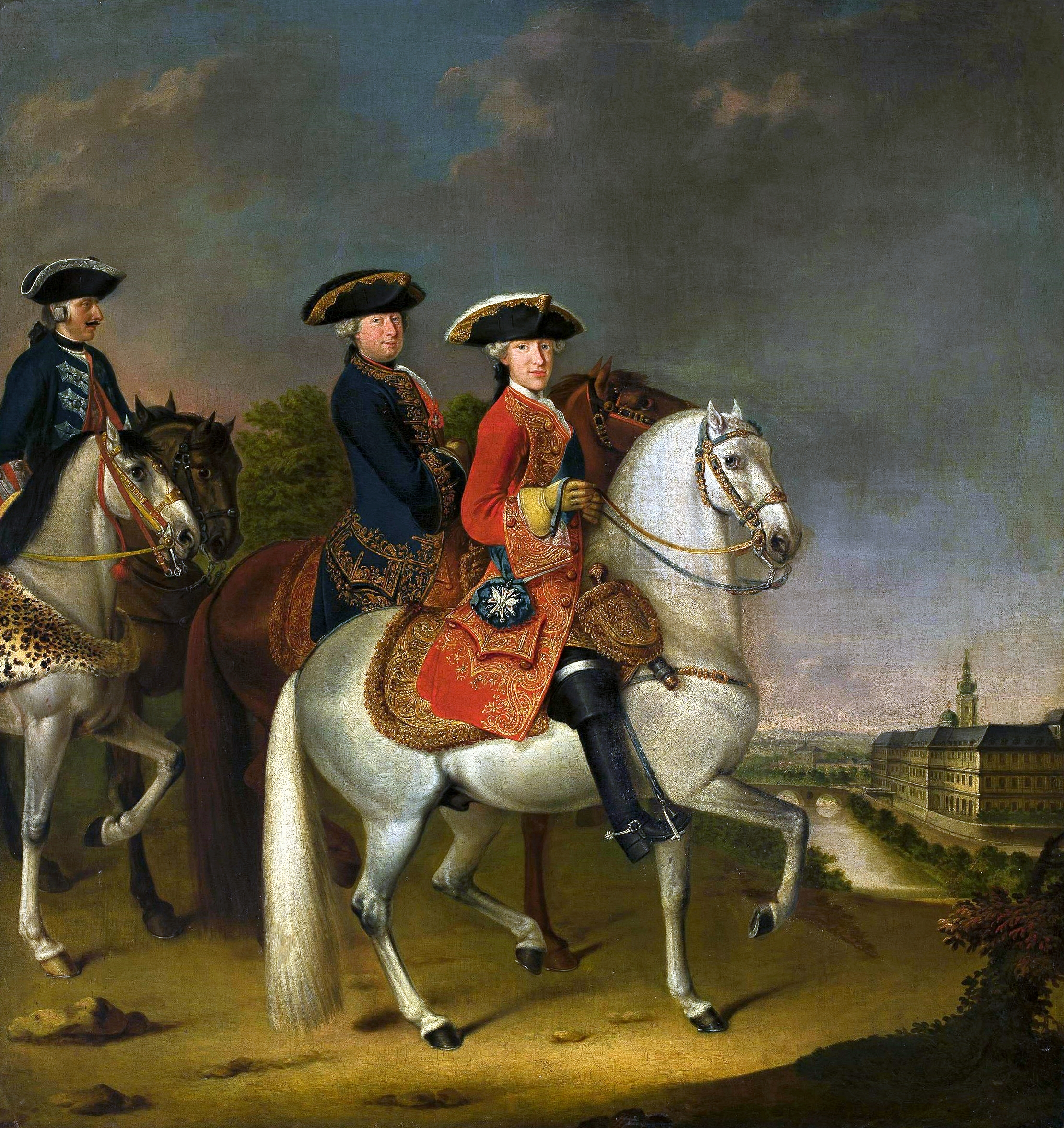
Ernest Augustus II, Duke of Saxe-Weimar-Eisenach with his Prime Minister Heinrich von Bünau on horseback by Johann Friedrich Löber, c. 1756, National Museum in Warsaw. The young duke was depicted before his main residence - Weimar City Castle.

He received advancement through the good offices of the Cabinet Minister of the Electors of Saxony, Count von Hoym, the uncle of his second wife. In 1734, after Hoym had been ousted by Count Brühl, Heinrich von Bünau was downgraded to the position of Senior Overseer of the County of Mansfeld in Eisleben.

In 1741 however he entered the service of the Emperor Charles VII, who made him an Imperial Privy Councillor (Reichshofrat), the first Protestant to fill that role, and employed him as an ambassador in the area of Upper and Lower Saxony. In 1745, after the death of the emperor, Bünau withdrew to his estate at Nöthnitz near Dresden to pursue his scientific and historical studies.

Between 1744 and 1751 he had Dahlen Castle built, on the Dahlen estate he had acquired by marriage, and for the decoration of which he commissioned Adam Friedrich Oeser in 1756. Apart from the estates of Nöthnitz, Dahlen, and Ossmannstedt, Bünau also owned those of Domsen, Göllnitz and Gross-Tauschwitz.

In 1751 Bünau was appointed as Guardian Governor of the Duchy of Saxe-Eisenach, during the minority of Duke Ernest Augustus II, for whom in 1756 he became Prime Minister in Weimar. In 1759, after the death of the Duke, he retired and spent the evening of his life on his estate at Ossmannstedt, near Weimar, where he died on 7 April 1762. after his death Ossmannstedt was used as a summer house by the Duchess Anna Amalia of Saxe-Weimar-Eisenach (widow of Ernest Augustus II, Duke of Saxe-Weimar-Eisenach and aunt to Queen Caroline of England) and her sons between 1762 and 1775.

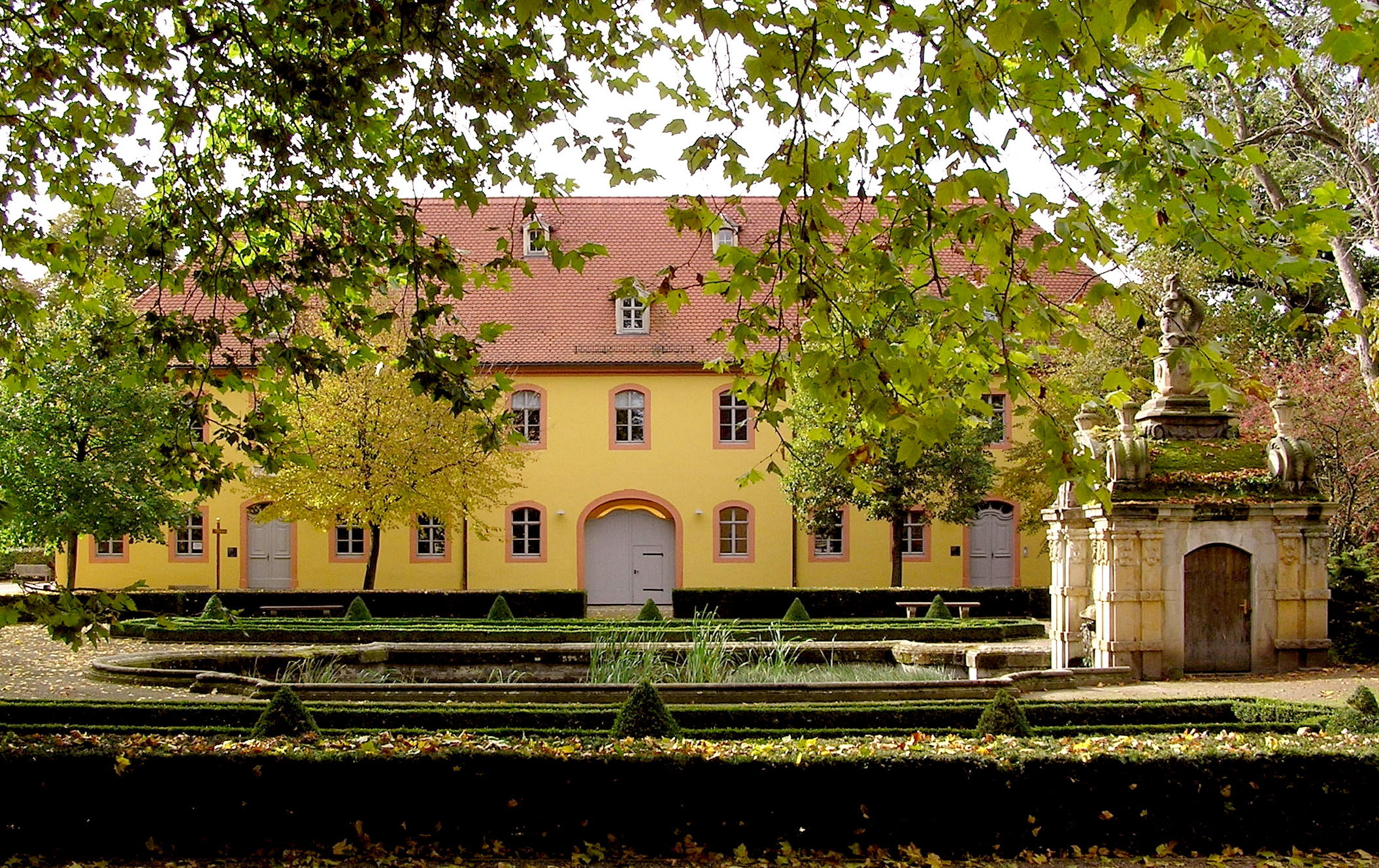
Ossmannstedt Estate

== Private life ==
Heinrich was married three times:

1) In 1721 he married firstly Augusta Helena von Döring (15 November 1706 - 04 November 1728), heiress of Dahlen Castle, great-granddaughter of David von Döring (1577-1638), Privy Councillor of John George I, Elector of Saxony. They had two sons:

- Heinrich Graf von Bünau (20 July 1722 - 29 August 1784), married to Countess Friederike Sophia von Degenfeld-Schonburg (1723-1789), granddaughter of Meinhardt Schomberg, 3rd Duke of Schomberg; had issue
- Günther Graf von Bünau (10 January 1726 - 11 March 1804), married firstly Johanna Erdmuthe von Schönfeld-Löbnitz (d. 1779); married secondly Erdmuthe Magdalena von der Sala (1750-1836), had issue from both marriages

2) On 23 November 1729 he married Erdmuthe Friederike von Hoym-Guteborn (24 April 1712 - 30 December 1742), daughter of Carl Siegfried von Hoym (1675-1738) and his wife, Dorothea Sophia von Loeben (1680-1742). The couple divorced in 1736. They had one daughter:

- Friederike Henriette Gräfin von Bünau (07 July 1733 - 28 February 1792), married in 1753 to Count Johann Erdmann Henckel von Donnersmarck (17 August 1728 - 13 March 1803). The couple divorced in 1783 and didn't have children.

3) In 1739 he married for the third time. The bride was Christiana Elisabeth von Arnim (b. 18 February 1699 - 29 August 1783), daughter of Wolf Christoph II von Arnim (1660-1727) and his wife, Johanne Christiane von Minckwitz (1678-1737). They had one son:

- Heinrich von Bünau (01 February 1743 - 10 April 1789), never married.

== Library ==
Bünau's private library comprised some 42,000 volumes. It was housed at first in Dresden, then on his estate at Nöthnitz Palace, and he allowed public access to it. The archaeologist Johann Joachim Winckelmann from Stendal worked at Nöthnitz between 1748 and 1754 as Bünau's secretary.

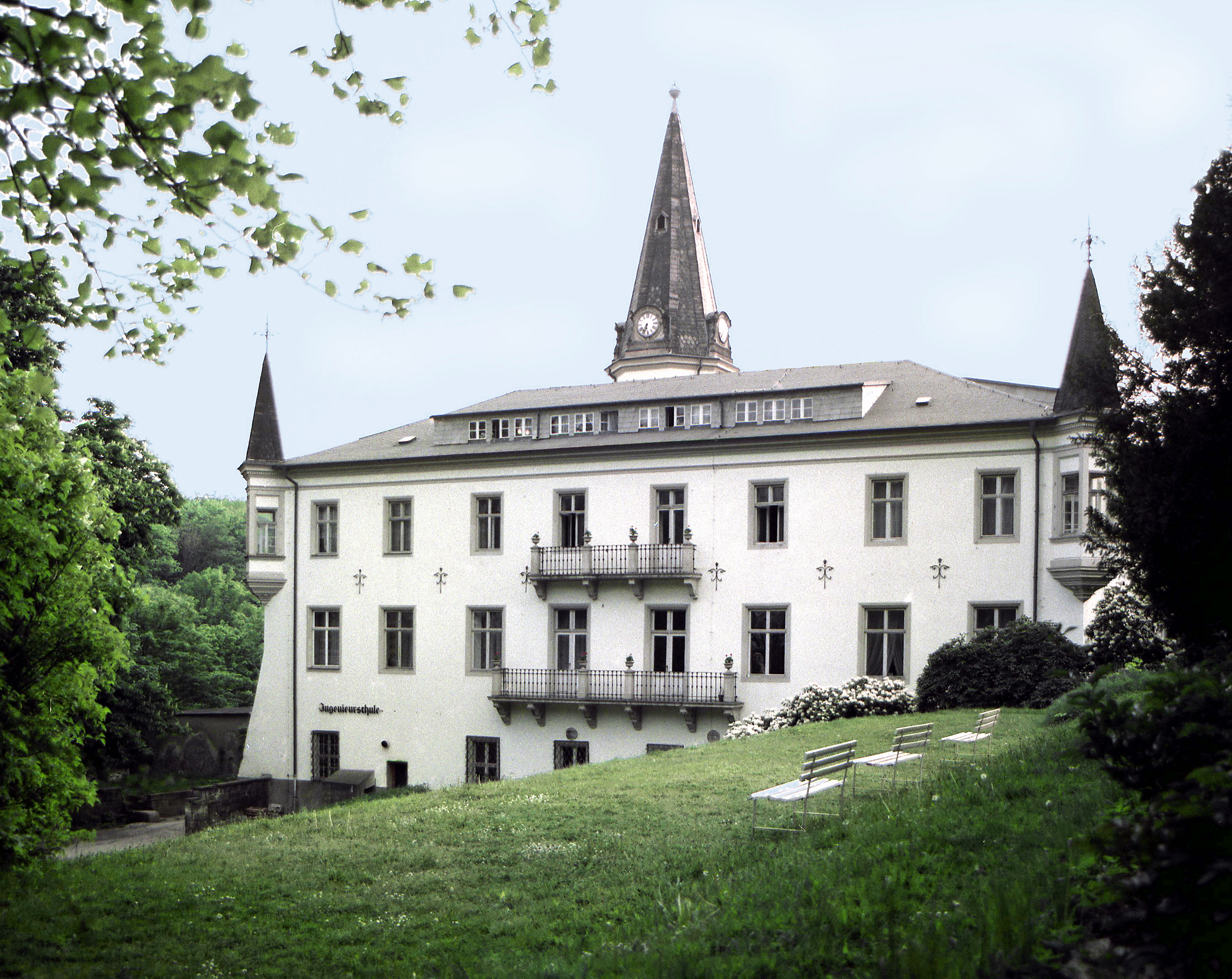
Nöthnitz Palace (still contained painting of Heinrich von Bünau and other Bünau artifacts).

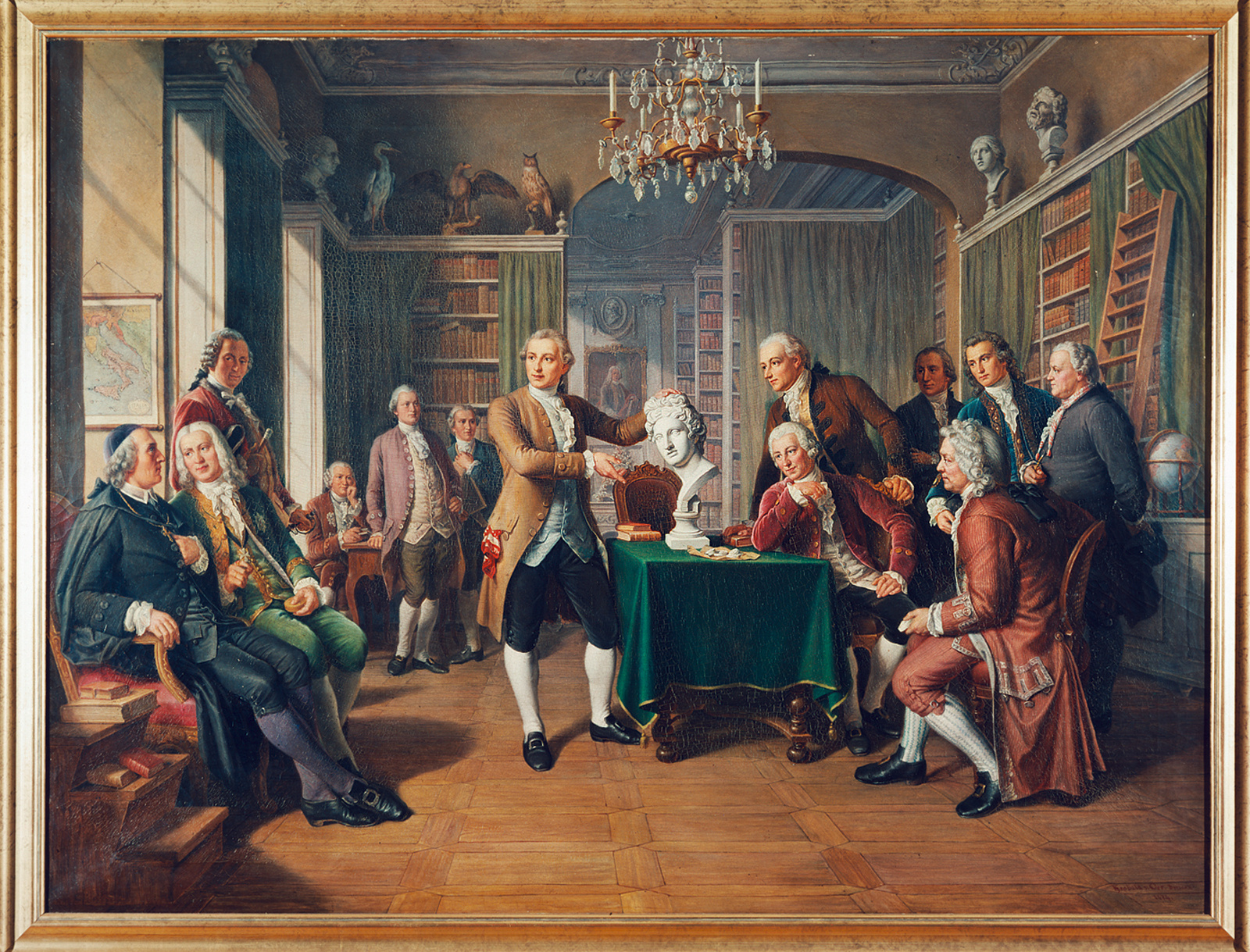
1874 paintings of scholars gathering at Nöthnitz Palace. (In the center was Johann Joachim Winckelmann, the painting next to him in the background was of Count Heinrich von Bünau)

== Works ==
- "Probe einer genauer und umständlichen Teutschen Kayser- und Reichshistorie oder Leben und Thaten Friedrichs I. Römischen Kaysers" (1722) (Attempt at a Comprehensive History of the German Emperor and Empire, or, The Life and Deeds of Frederick I, Holy Roman Emperor)
- "Genaue und umständliche teutsche Kayser- und Reichshistorie aus den bewährtesten Geschichtsschreibern und Urkunden zusammengetragen" in 4 volumes (1728–1743) (Exact and Comprehensive History of the German Emperor and Empire compiled from the Most Valued Historians and Documents)
- "Historie des Kriegs zwischen Frankreich, England und Teutschland" in 4 volumes (1763–1767) (History of the War between France, England and Germany)
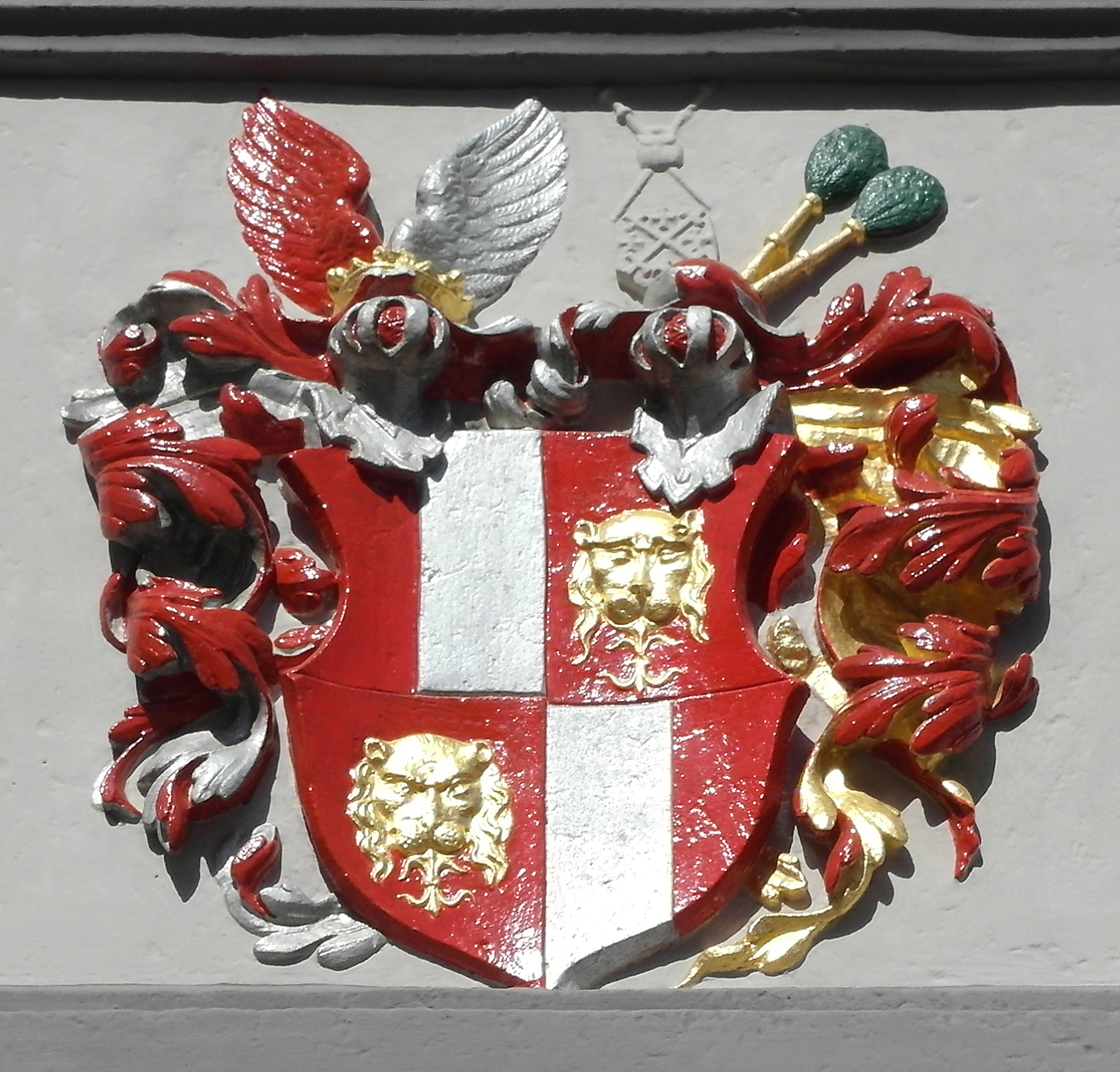
  Count von Bünau's coat of arms.
