= Dahlen Castle =

Castle in Germany

Coordinates: 51°22′03″N 12°59′45″E

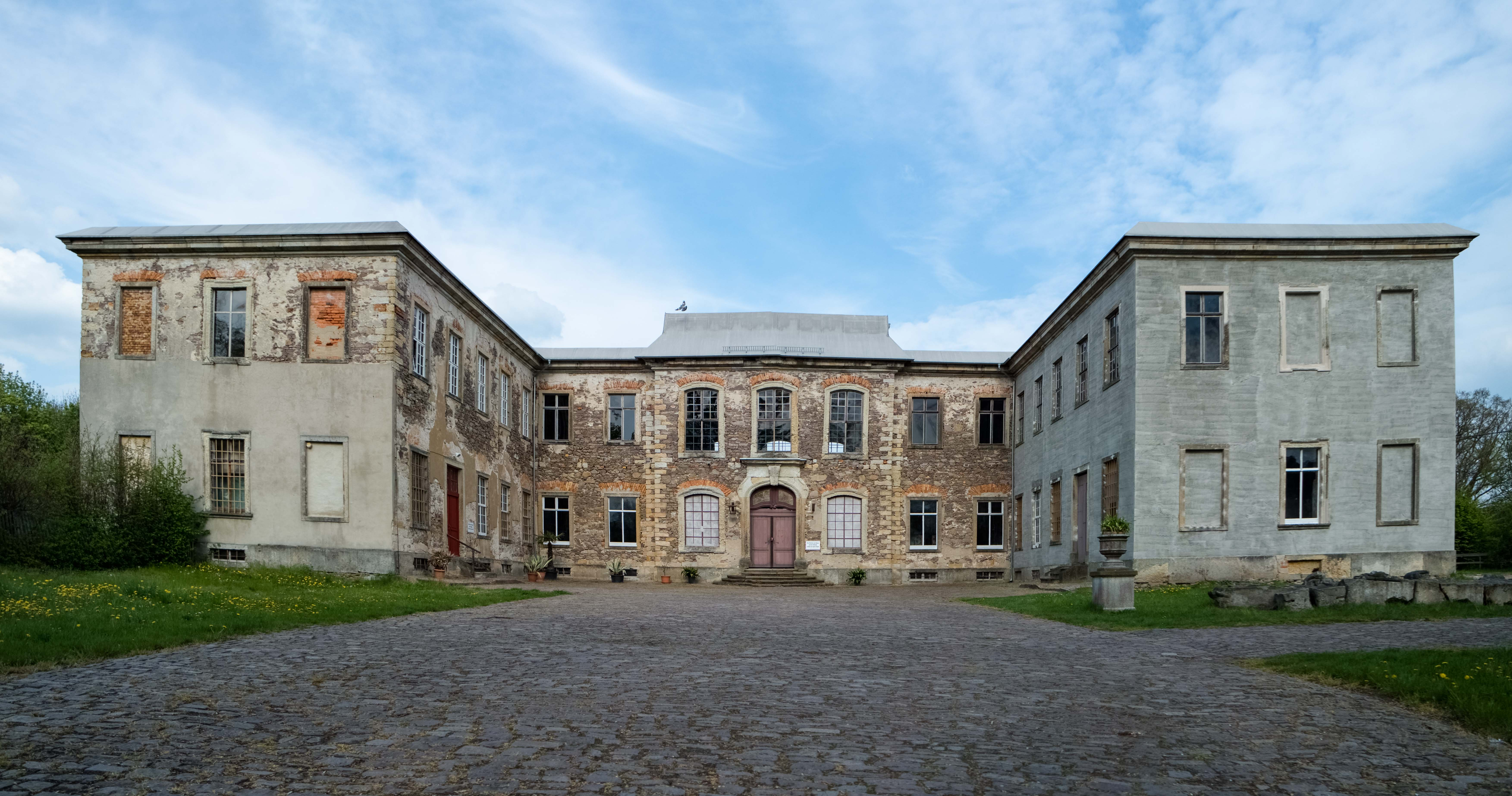
Castle ruins (2015)

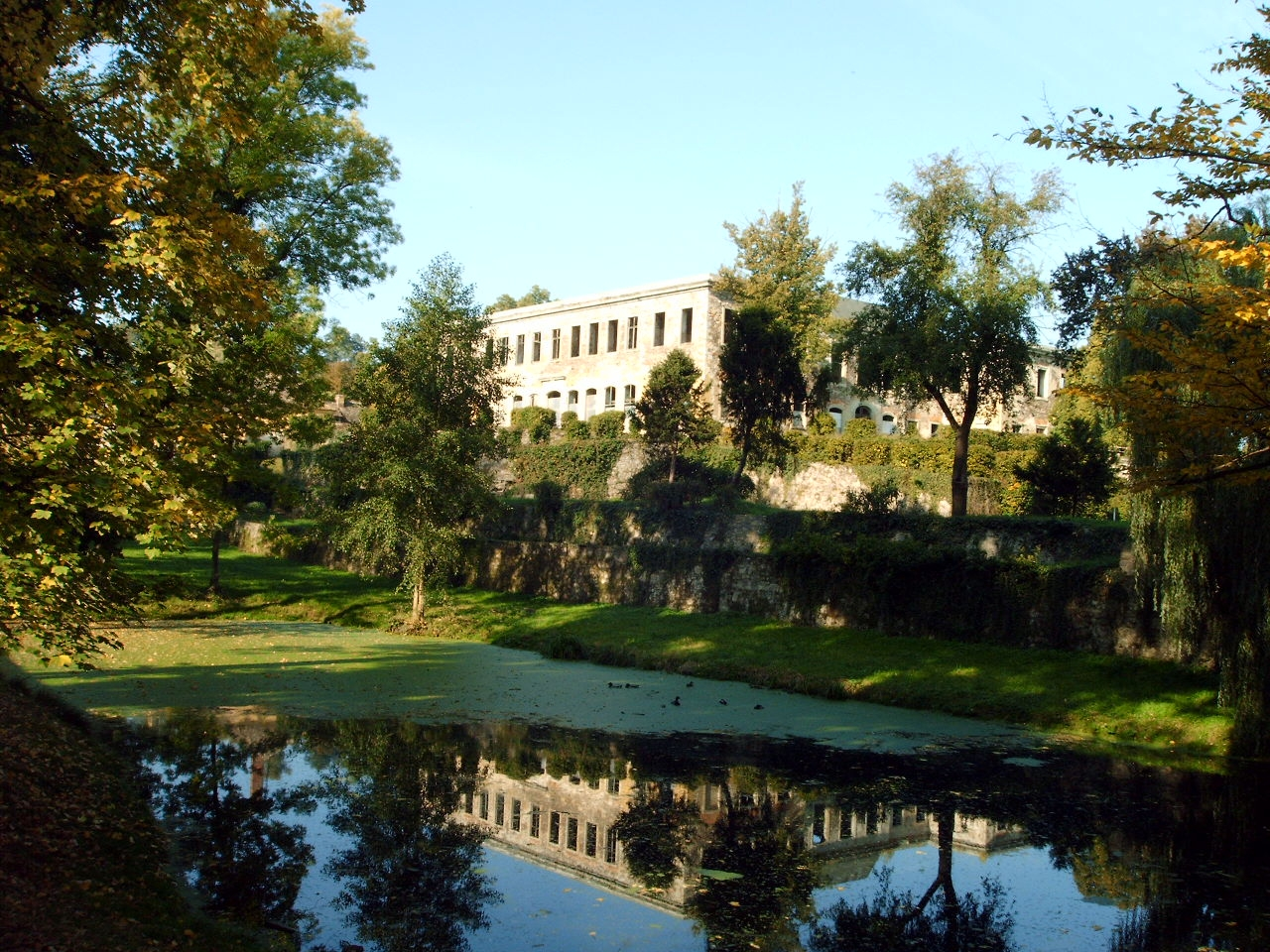
Castle ruins seen from the town park

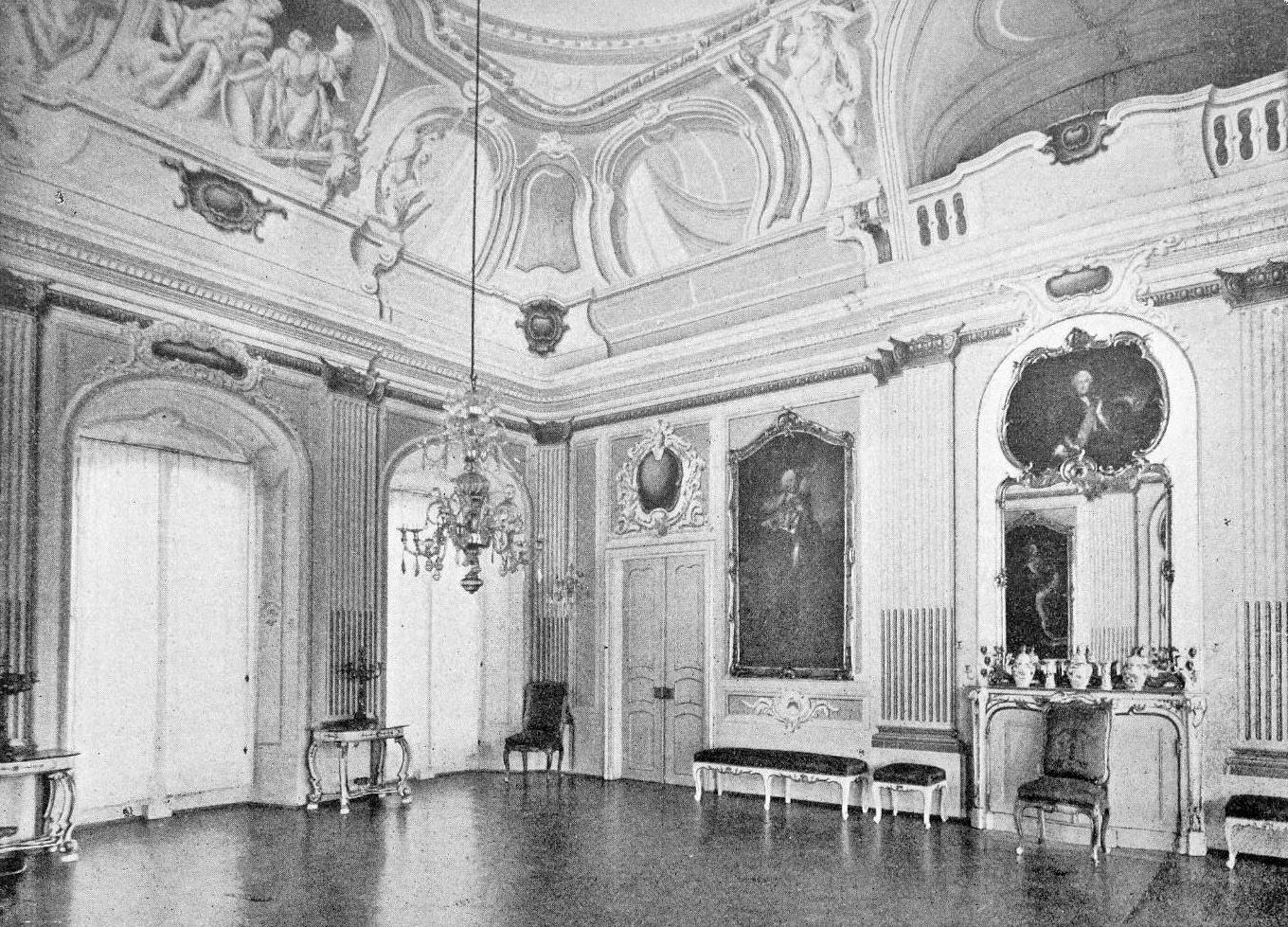
Emperor's Hall

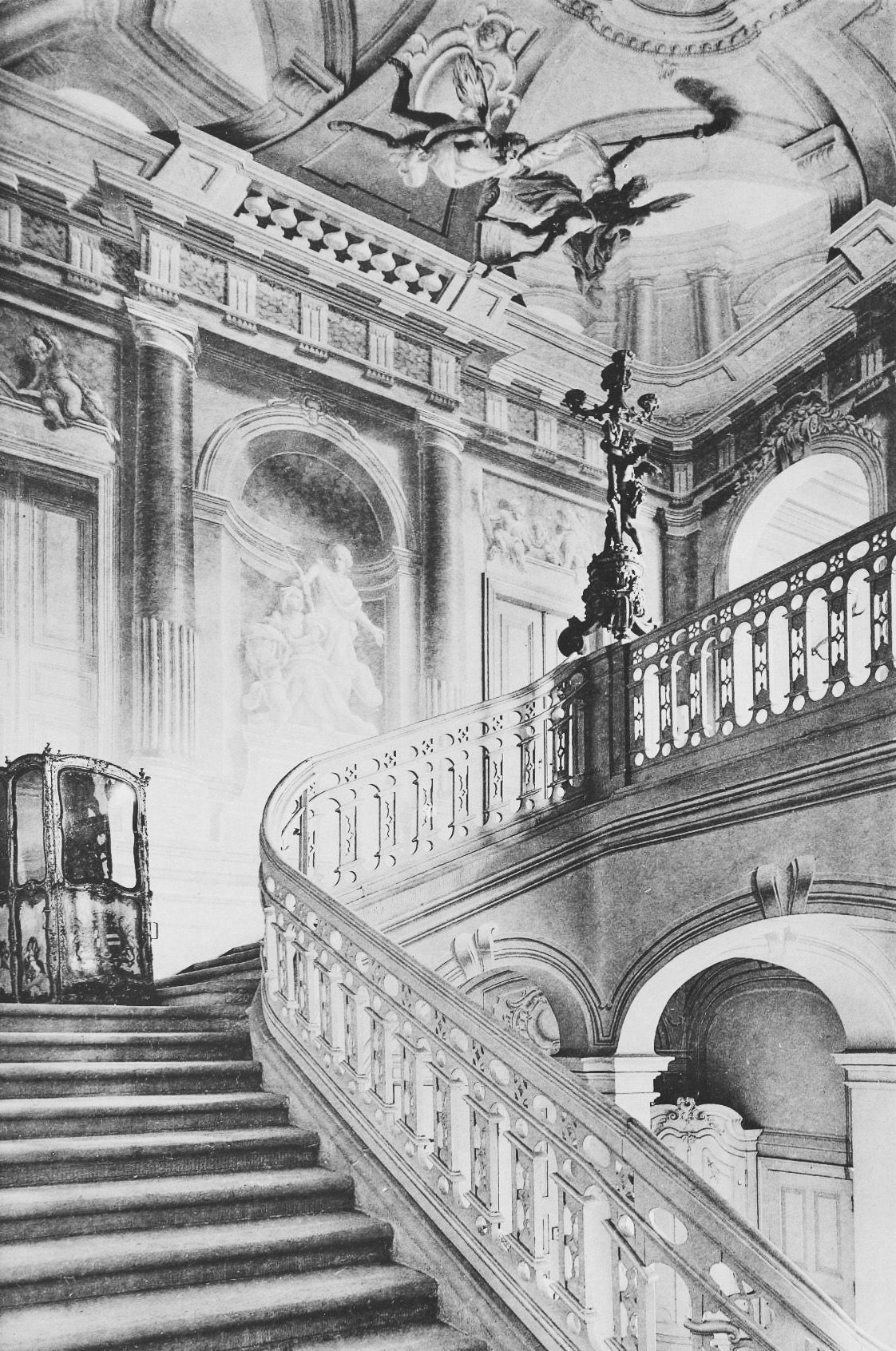
Grand Stair Hall

Dahlen Castle (German: Schloss Dahlen) is a castle built between 1744 and 1751 in the small town of Dahlen, located in Saxony, Germany.

== History ==
=== Medieval times ===
Since the beginning of the 13th century there was a noble dwelling in Dahlen ("Edelhof, lat. curia"), falling under the administration of the bishops of Naumburg. This developed into a feudal estate "Rittergut" granted by the monarch as a lien to various aristocrats who were bound in turn to maintain law and order and protect the key road between Oschatz and Leipzig. In the 14th century the overlord ownership of Dahlen changed from the Bishopric of Naumburg to the Crown of Bohemia and then in the middle of the 15th century to the Wettin royal family.

In 1305 at the time of Bishop Ulrich of Naumburg, Dahlen was sold to Bodo IV Von Ilburg, lord of Liebenwerda, for the sum of 500 Marks of Freiberg Silver to Otto V von Ilenburg, lord of Uibigau. Later, it was returned to the possession of the Naumburg Stift and in 1367 Bishop Gerhard sold with Strehla, Leisnig, Tiefenau and Elsterwerda to Herzog Polk, Elector of Schweinitz and Margrave of the Lausitz; on his death it returned once again to Naumburg. Thereafter, in the time of the Emperor Carl IV, Dahlen was owned by the royal house of Saxony after an agreement was reached on 23 April 1459 between King George of Bohemia, the Frederick, Elector of Saxony and Duke William of Saxony.

In 1383 Dahlen's owner was Luthold von Torgau, thereafter Hanns von Schleinitz of the Meißen branch of the family, whose father, Heinrich von Schleinitz of Seerhausen died in 1449 and was buried in the von Schleinitz Chapel in the St. Afra Church in Meißen.

In 1618 his descendant Heinrich von Schleinitz sold Dahlen for 44,200 Bohemian Guilders to his brother-in-law Christoph von Loß the Younger, who on 22.07.1619 sold it to the John George I, Elector of Saxony. After 1630 the Elector then sold the estate to his Privy Councillor David von Döring who had recently been ennobled and owned many estates in the area (Seelingstädt, Großsteinberg, Bohlen, Mühl, Börln).

=== 18th century onwards ===
The new castle was designed by the renowned architect Johann Christoph Knöffel (who died in 1752) and built between 1744 and 1751 for Heinrich Graf von Bünau (02.06.1697–07.04.1762) as a residence, probably on the site of a medieval building most likely built by the von Schleinitz family.

Built in the late Baroque style, the castle featured over 30 rooms and some of the finest examples of trompe-l'œil, particularly in the Grand Stair Hall. This and the ceilings of the Kaisersaal (Emperor Hall) and the Weißersaal (White Hall) were painted by Adam Friedrich Oeser, whom the Count commissioned in 1756.

Perhaps the castle's most notable guest was King Frederick II. "the Great" of Prussia who at the end of the Seven Years' War resided here during the peace treaty negotiations taking place at the nearby Schloss Hubertusburg. On 21 February 1763 he ratified, in the White Hall, some agreements reportedly signed on 15.02.1763 in Hubertusburg to the so-called Treaty of Hubertusburg that ended the war.[1]

The builder of the castle, Heinrich Graf von Bünau, married three times: first on 05.01 1721 Augusta Helena von Döring, a granddaughter of the aforementioned David von Döring, through whom by inheritance Dahlen came into the possession of the von Bünau family. She died on 04.11 1728 and was the mother of Günther Graf von Bünau (1726–1804); secondly in 1729 to Erdmuthe Friederike von Hoym (1712–1742); and lastly on 24 July 1739 to Christiane Elisabeth von Arnim (1699–1783).

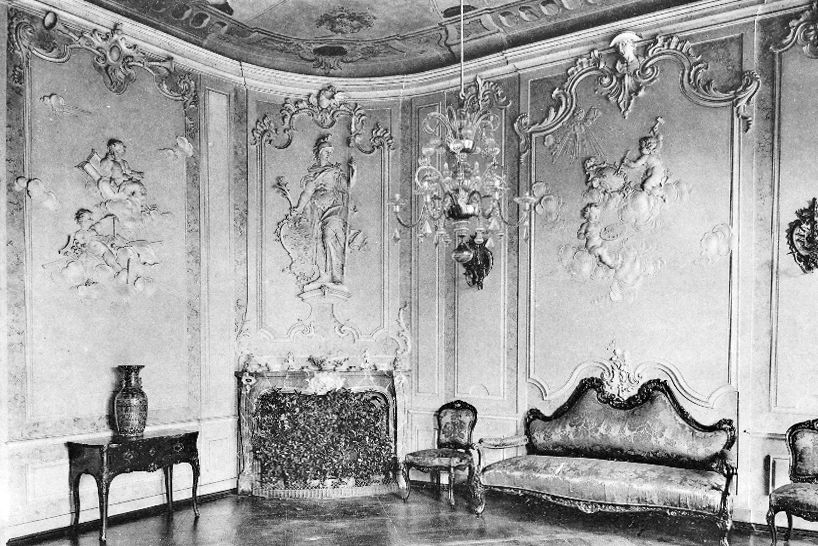
Weißersaal (White Hall) were painted by Adam Friedrich Oeser

The aforementioned son Günther Graf von Bünau (1726–1804) inherited Dahlen on his father's death and was succeeded in turn by his son Günther Graf von Bünau (1768–1841) and then by his son Heinrich Graf von Bünau (1810 in Dahlen – 1842 in Venice). As Heinrich von Bünau left no issue, Dahlen passed to his widow Johanna Louise Augusta Gräfin von Einsiedel (1805–1871), the widow of Friedrich Freiherr von Friesen who died in 1871. After Heinrich von Bünau's death, Johanna married her third husband, Karl Heinrich August Sahrer von Sahr (1821–1874). The couple also left no issue. Dahlen was inherited by his younger brother Johann Georg Sahrer von Sahr (1823–1858). His son Dietrich August Leo Sahrer von Sahr (1852–1925) was succeeded by his son Siegfried Sahrer von Sahr (1891–1953) who, having no children of his own, in 1938 adopted his nephew Hans-Heinrich von Schönberg, son of his sister Sibylla and her husband Caspar von Schönberg, who henceforth bore the surname Sahrer von Sahr-Schönberg.

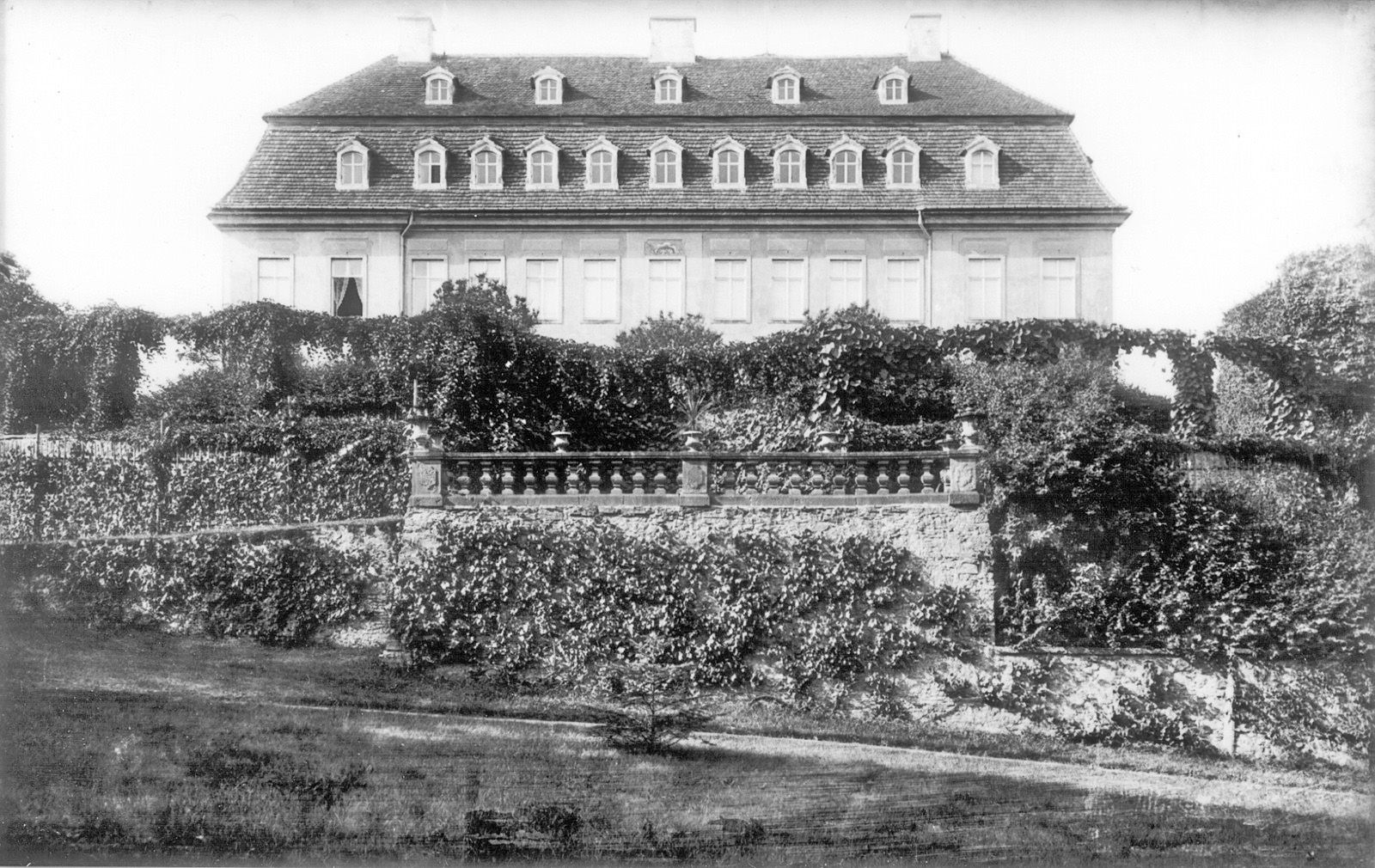

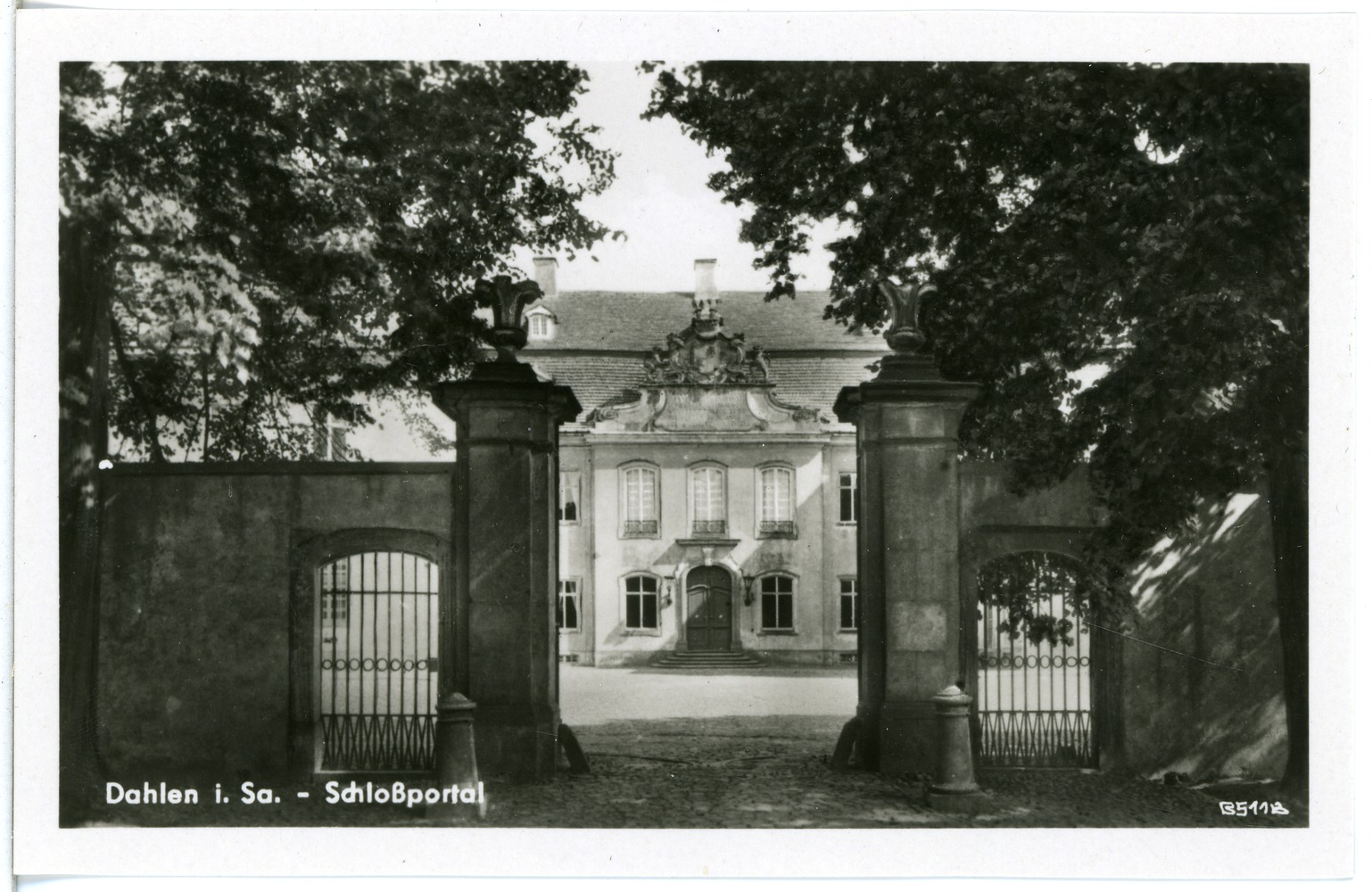

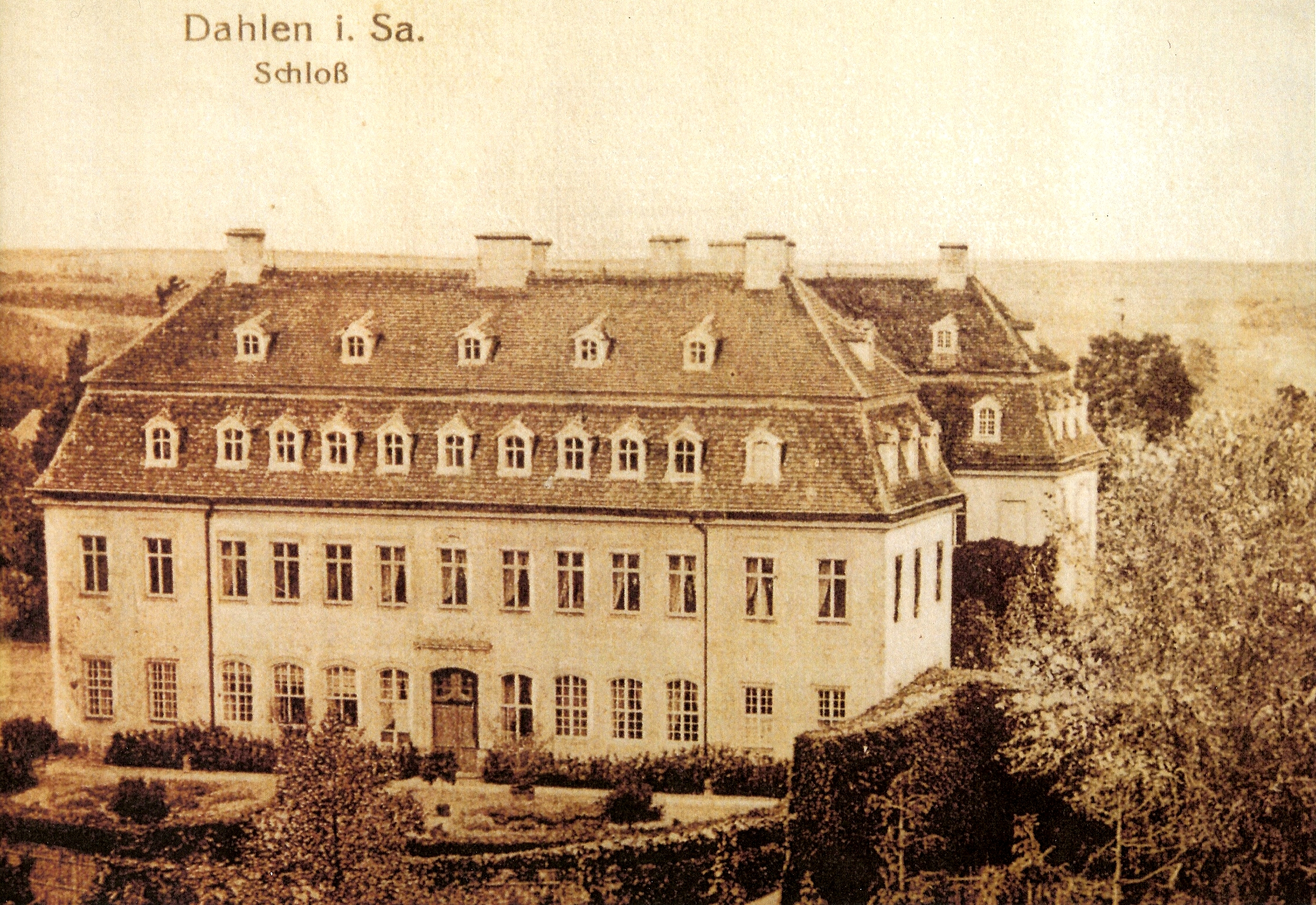

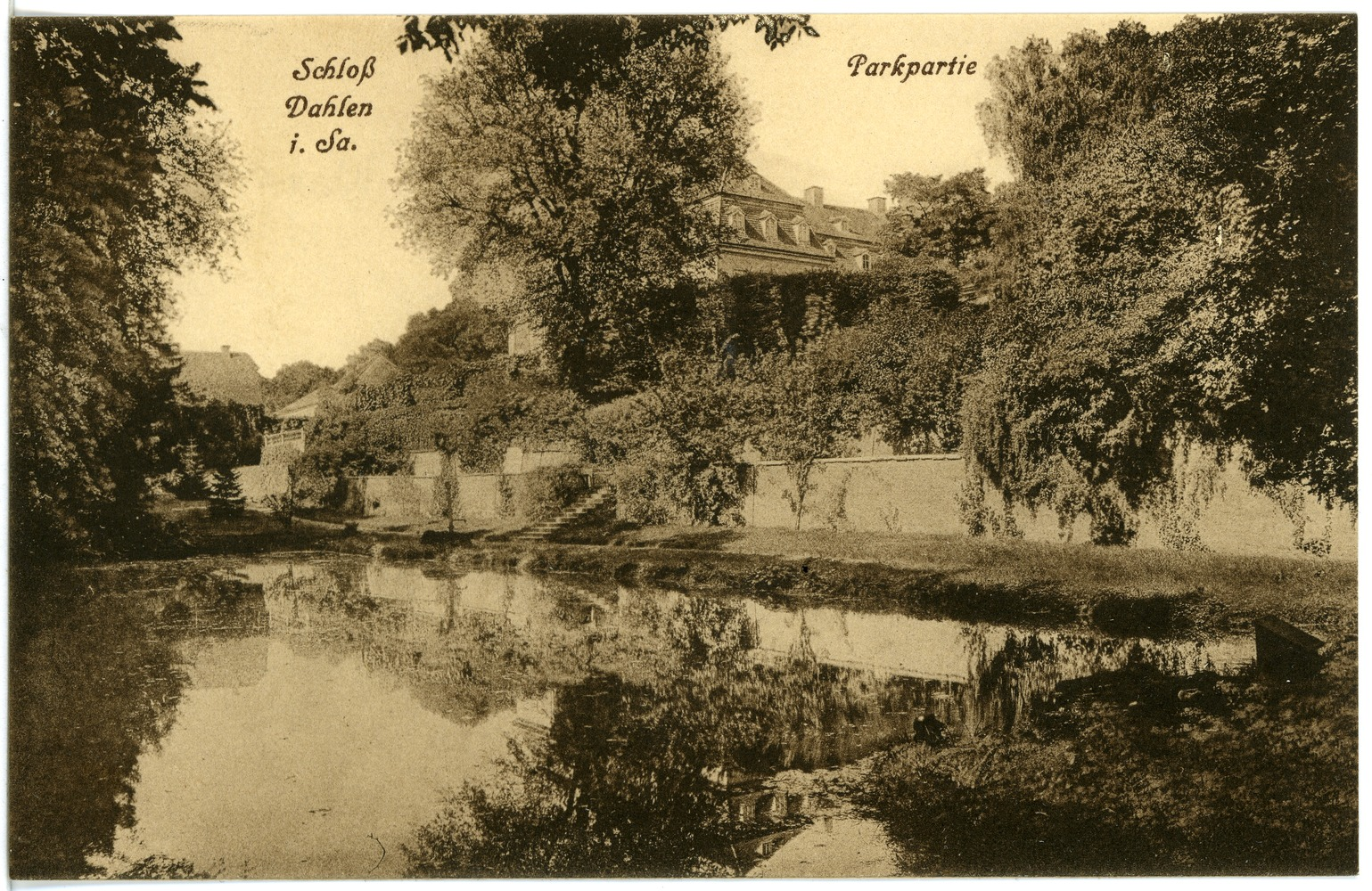

=== World War II aftermath ===
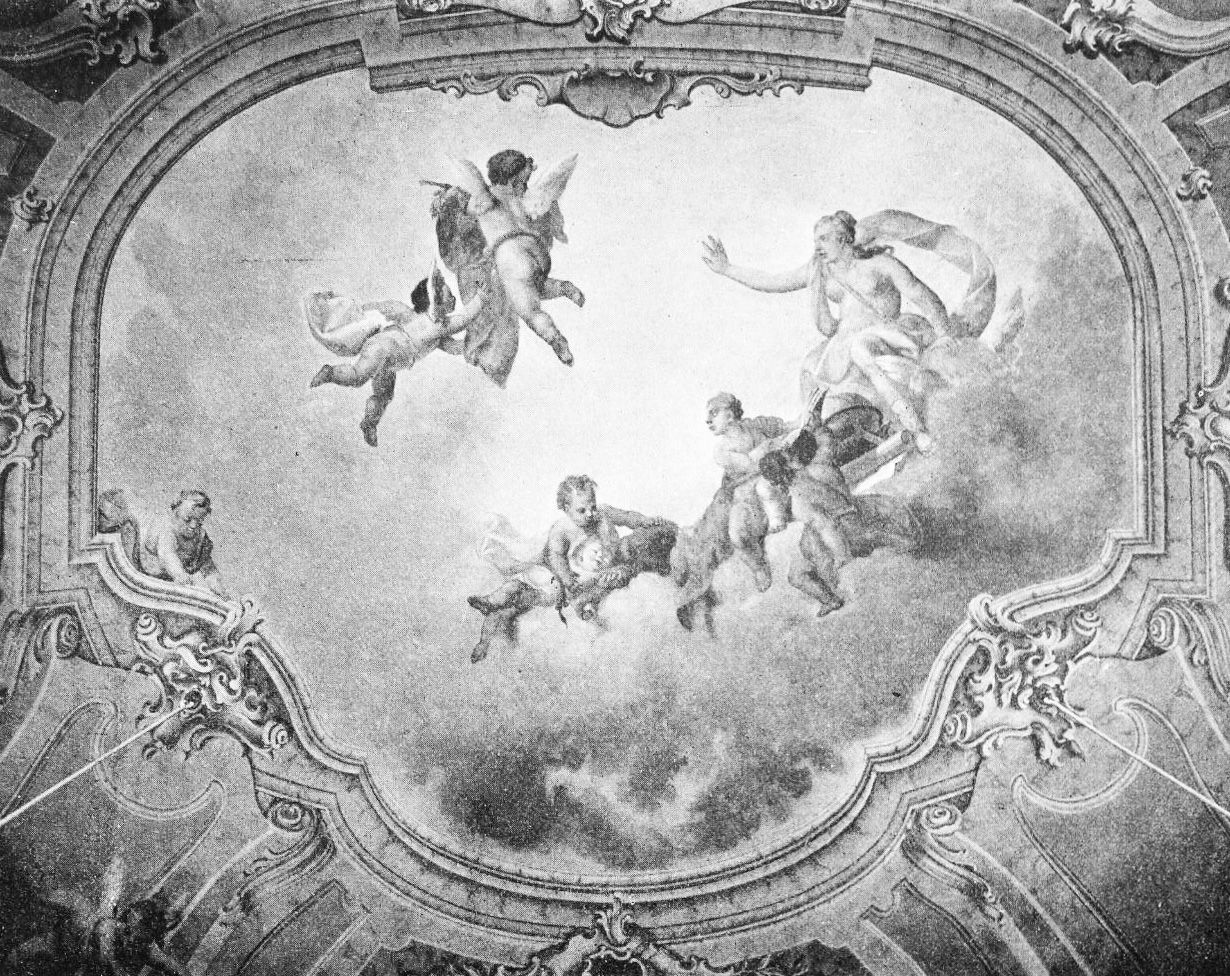
ceiling painted by Adam Friedrich Oeser

Sahrer von Sahr-Schönberg lost the entire estate in 1945 when Soviet-occupied German communists expropriated all movable and immovable assets of the "class enemy" and was banished to the Island of Rügen. He returned to visit Dahlen after 1989. One of his two sons settled with his family in the region and has invested in farming land and forests in and around Dahlen.

Having since 1945 become the property of the East German state, the East German authorities first used the buildings as a police school, then as a bakery and a meat-processing school. Very soon after extensive restoration work had been completed, on 20 March 1973, a fire supposedly caused by a defective chimney burnt the central part of the H-shaped castle to an empty shell. The authorities subsequently took the roof tiles and roof timbers from the wings that had not been affected for use elsewhere. The insurance money was used to build a new school in Brandenburg, contrary to the terms of the insurance policy. The illegality of this action was never questioned in East German times. After 1989 no questions were asked either. As it was a clear case of insurance fraud or misappropriation of funds even according to East German law, an investigation would have held this to be illegal and a repatriation of funds from the State of Brandenburg should have been made to the State of Saxony, thereby enabling the ruin to be rebuilt. It is not too late for this process to start but there are no politicians willing to get involved.

In about 1995–96, the town council of Dahlen empowered the mayoress the late Mrs. Bärbel Augustynik to request the Province of Torgau-Oschatz (now Nordsachsen) to transfer ownership of the castle from the state to the town, although there was no legal entitlement to do so. The Province was probably pleased to be rid of the financial problem of owning the ruin. This step was a death knell to the castle's future, as the small town had no means of rebuilding it and failed to apply for government and European Union subsidies which at the time were generous and might have been made available for the project. Such subsidies were and are usually still extended in the ratio of 10% applicant ("Eigenmittel" = own equity) and 90% German State/EU. The town of Dahlen would never be able to find such sums and is indeed not permitted to spend them from its small budget so one must question why ownership was ever transferred to it. Later attempts by an American private investor to purchase the castle and restore it were blocked by the town's councillors and mayor, who would only sell the ruined buildings on a site up to the back terrace of the building and not an inch more, thus limiting virtually all possible uses for a new owner as it would have had no garden.

Latterly the town issued a right of use to an association which has the stated aim of preserving, but not rebuilding the ruin. Nevertheless, the external appearance of the ruin has already changed in a short space of time, as window panes have appeared in many rooms and it is beginning to look inhabited. Donations have been applied to replace a weathered covering over the flat concrete roof which was built at the behest of the late Johannes Döhler, former head of the communist agricultural unit and member of the ZK (central committee of the communist government), a personal friend of Walter Ulbricht.

The castle ensemble consists of the main H-shaped building; a cavalier's house, due to the crescent shape commonly called the "Banana"; some remaining parts of the three-sided farm courtyard which were awarded to private persons in the 1945 Land Reform; and an Orangery that was converted into an agricultural mixing plant and altered beyond recognition by the communist LPG agricultural unit, sold after 1989 to one of its heads who is a town councillor in Dahlen.

The castle is unlikely to be rebuilt in the foreseeable future, given the stated desire of the majority of town councillors to maintain it as a ruin rather than rebuild it. Nevertheless, future generations might still see a reconstruction, if the political climate changes and funds become available.

== Today ==
The Dahlen Castle Association (Schloss Dahlen GbR) was formed in 2005 to head a campaign for the restoration of the castle but its right of use was not renewed by the town council and ran out on 31.12.2008. On 03.01.2009 a new association was formed, "Schloss- und Parkverein Dahlen e.V." which has a significant number of members who are town councillors.

== Important rooms ==
- White Hall (German: Weisser Saal): this room featured walls of plaster and marble with reliefs of the Greek deities Apollo and Minerva. The ceiling was painted with cherubs and a beautiful sky scene.
- Emperor's Hall (German: Kaisersaal): this was a large ballroom used for entertaining royalty and high dignitaries. This room had a painted ceiling similar to that of the White Hall, and also featured a high ceiling and two balconies from the third floor looking into the room.
