= Adam Friedrich Oeser =

German painter (1717–1799)

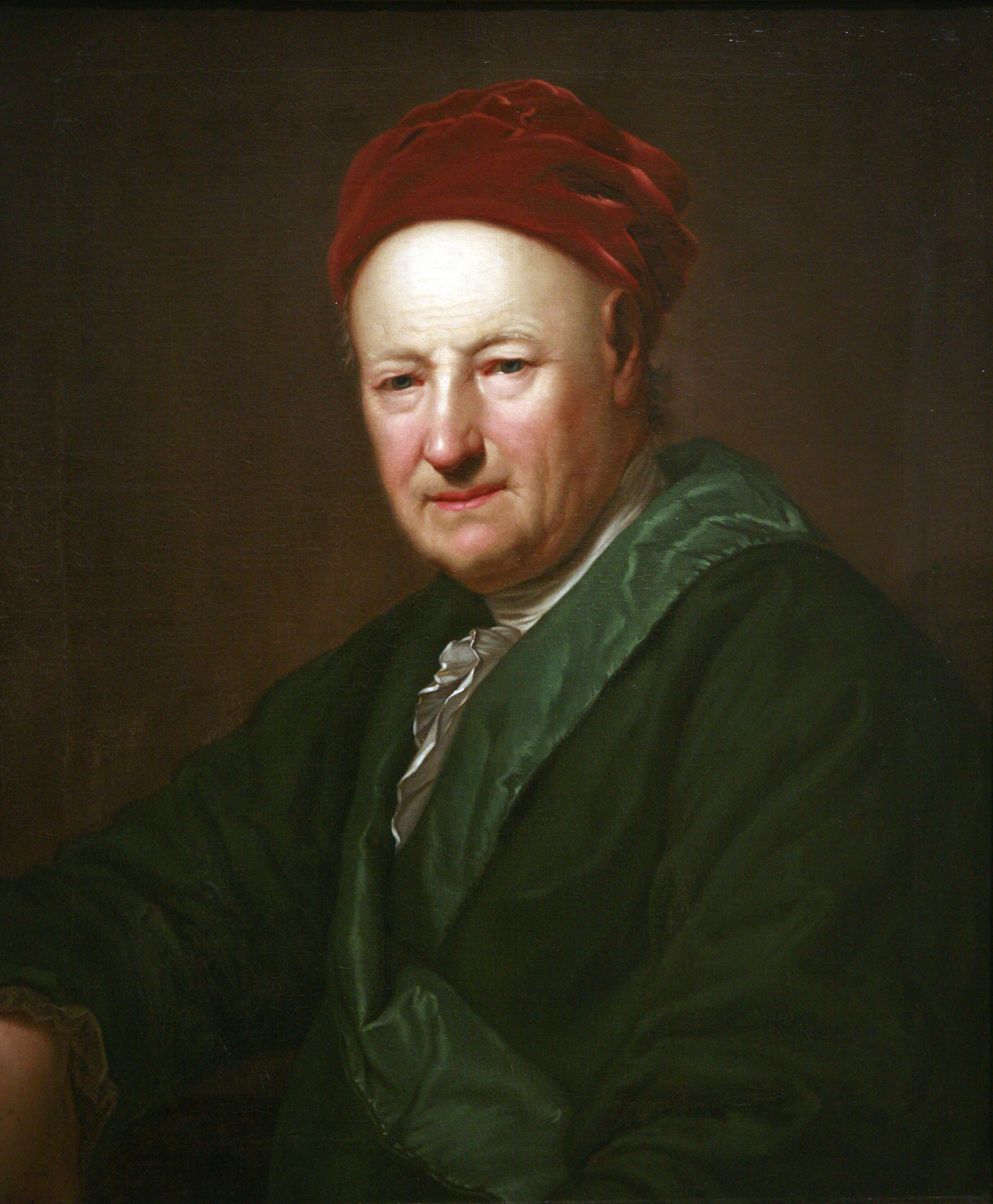
Portrait, by Anton Graff (Musée des Beaux-Arts de Strasbourg)

Adam Friedrich Oeser (17 February 1717 – 18 March 1799) was a German etcher, painter and sculptor.

== Biography ==
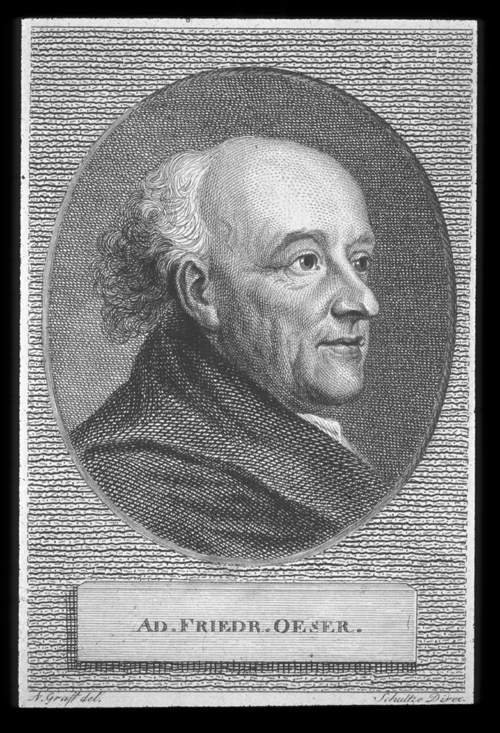
Adam Friedrich Oeser in 1750

Oeser worked and studied in his native Pressburg (student of Georg Raphael Donner in sculpture) and Vienna at the Vienna Academy (student of Jacob van Schuppen and Daniel Grau in painting). He went to Dresden in Saxony in 1739, where he studied with Mengs and Dietrich, and created portraits and scenes for the Royal Opera, and mural paintings in Schloss Hubertusburg (1749). In 1756 Count Heinrich von Bünau commissioned him to decorate the newly built Schloss Dahlen.

Oeser moved to Leipzig in 1759. Appointed director of the newly founded Academy there in 1764, he zealously opposed mannerism in art. He was a stout champion of Winckelmann's advocacy of reform on antique lines. He also befriended Winckelmann, who lived with him and his family in 1754/55.

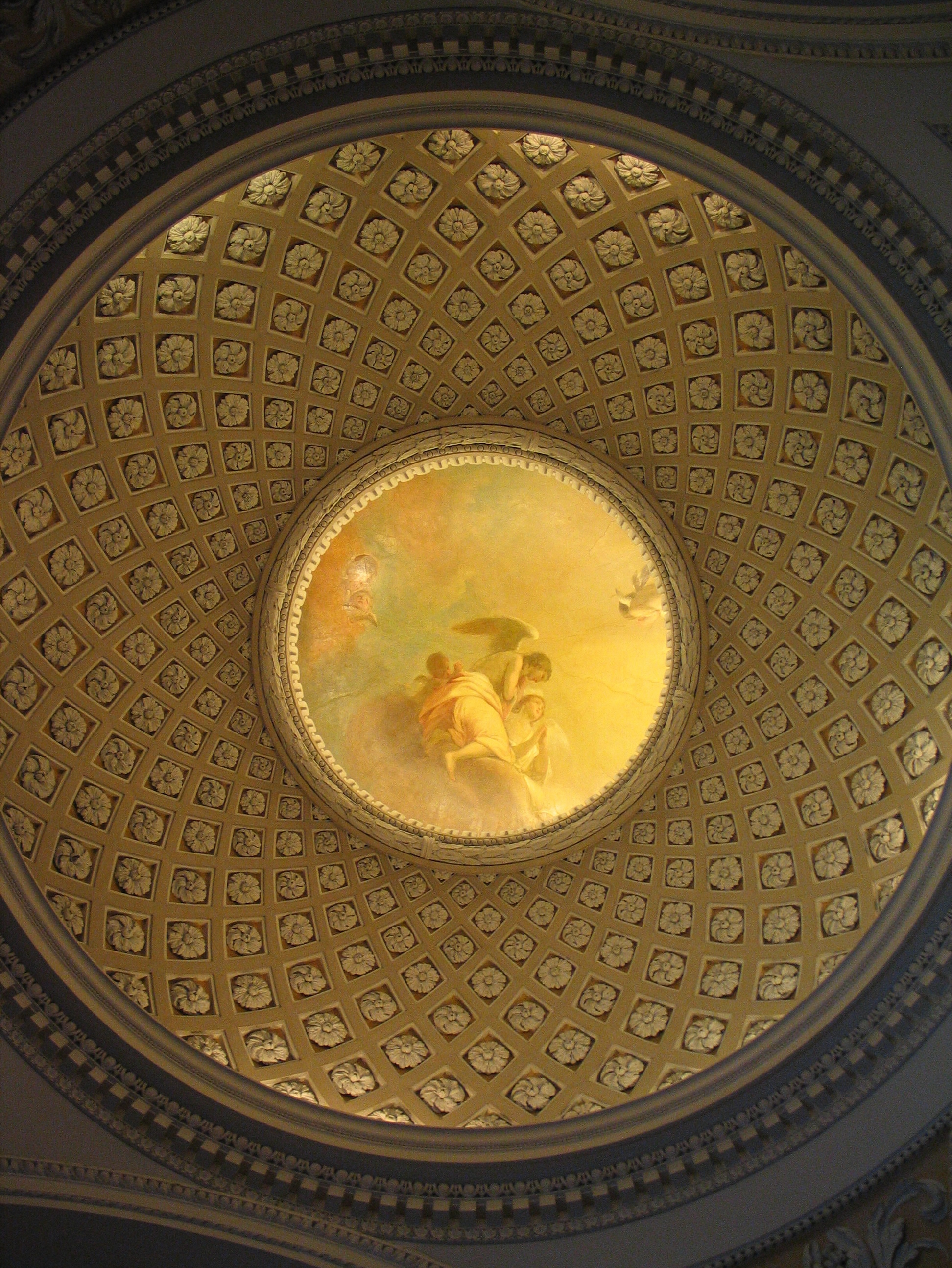
Painting by Oeser in St. Nicholas Church, Leipzig

Oeser's chief importance was as a teacher. He was the drawing teacher of Johann Wolfgang Goethe, with whom he kept up friendly relations afterwards at Weimar. Besides a number of decorative works, mostly ceilings, he painted mythological and religious canvases and portraits, among the best being: "The Artist's Children" (1766, Dresden Gallery), "Marriage at Cana" (1777) and four others in Leipzig Museum, and "The Painter's Studio" (Weimar Museum). His best effort in sculpture is the monument of Elector Frederick Augustus (1780) on the Königsplatz in Leipzig, which he created together with his student and architect Johann Carl Friedrich Dauthe. Today, it is in the garden of the Gohlis Palace in Leipzig. In the ballroom inside the palace is the ceiling painting “Life of Psyche” (1779) by Oeser.

In 1766 Oeser became a member of the Masonic Lodge Minerva zu den drei Palmen, Leipzig. In 1776 he became a member of the Balduin Lodge, Leipzig.

Among his pupils was Sophie Dinglinger. Oeser died in 1799 in Leipzig.
