= Dahlen, Saxony =

Dahlen
- Town
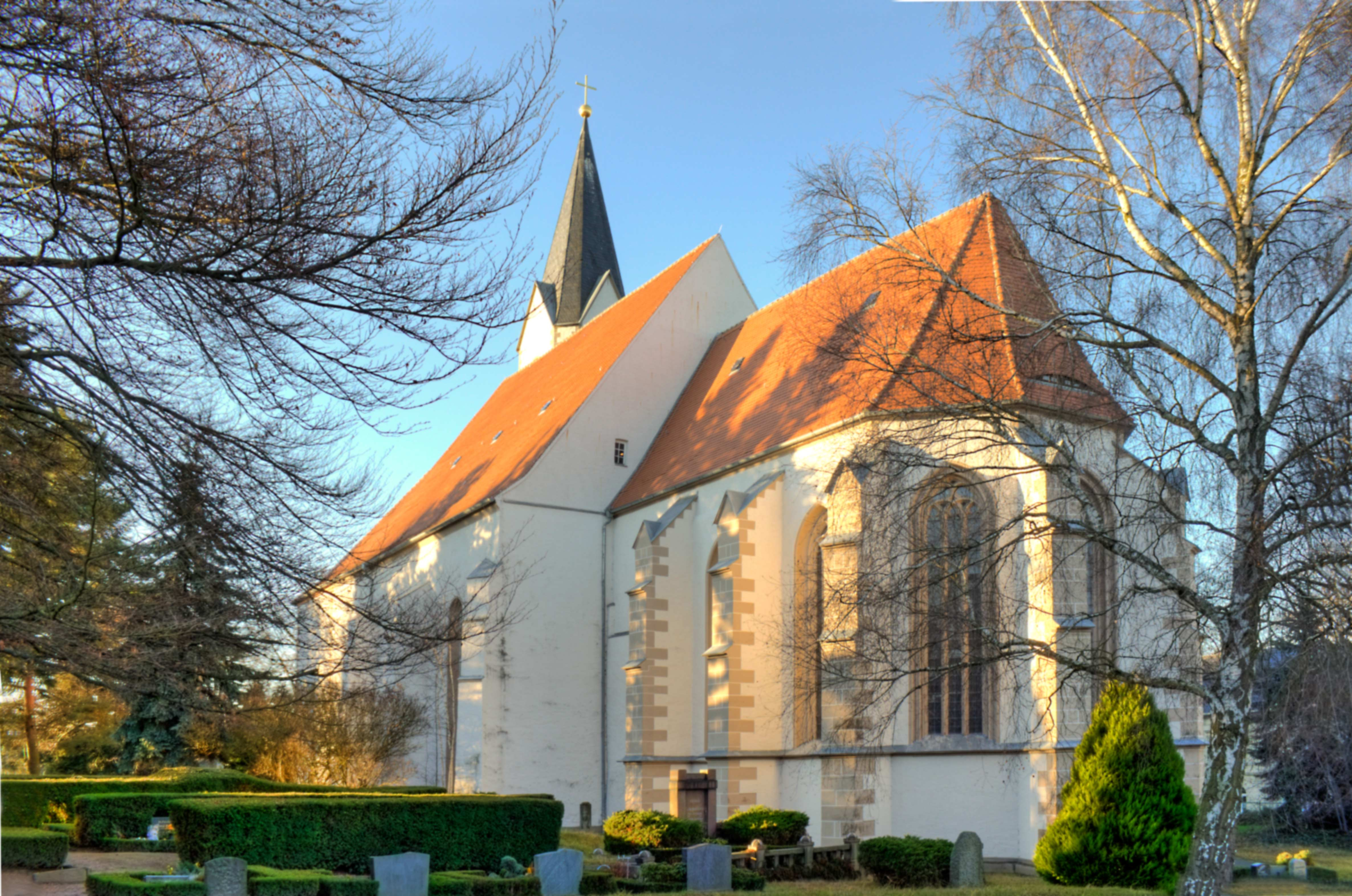
- Dahlen Church

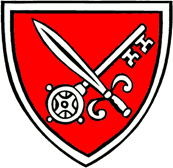
- Coat of arms

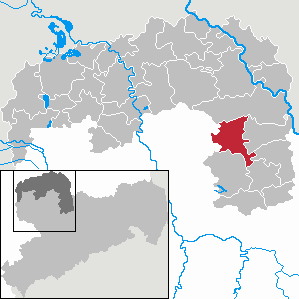
- Location of Dahlen within Nordsachsen district
- Interactive map of Dahlen
- Location within Germany Location within Saxony
- Coordinates: 51°22′N 13°0′E
- Country: Germany
- State: Saxony
- District: Nordsachsen
- Subdivisions: 10

Government
  - Mayor (2022–29): Matthias Löwe (WGHD)

Area
  - Total: 71.87 km^{2} (27.75 sq mi)
- Elevation: 158 m (518 ft)

Population (2025-12-31)
  - Total: 4,051
  - Density: 56.37/km^{2} (146.0/sq mi)
- Time zone: UTC+01:00 (CET)
  - Summer (DST): UTC+02:00 (CEST)
- Postal codes: 04774
- Dialling codes: 034361
- Vehicle registration: TDO, DZ, EB, OZ, TG, TO
- Website: www.dahlen.de

Dahlen (German pronunciation: [ˈdaːlən]) is a town in the district Nordsachsen, in Saxony, Germany. Since 1994, the town of Dahlen consists of the old town with the addition of neighbouring villages Börln with Bortewitz, Radegast and Schwarzer Kater (literal translation: Black Tomcat), Großböhla, Neuböhla and Kleinböhla, Schmannewitz and Ochsensaal.

== Geography ==
The town is the gateway to the Dahlener Heath. The neighbouring towns are Wermsdorf (11 km), Oschatz (12 km) and Torgau. Dahlen is located 22 km south of Torgau and 44 km east of Leipzig.

The Bundesstraße 6 goes through Neuböhla in the south of the district. The Leipzig–Dresden railway also passes nearby. The town (which was completely destroyed by fire in the 1800s) is home to the ruin of Dahlen Castle, which was commandeered as a temporary headquarters of King Frederick the Great of Prussia during negotiations for the so-called Hubertusburg Peace Settlement which had to be signed in Dahlen as the Prussians had taken all the furniture as war booty from Schloss Hubertusburg.

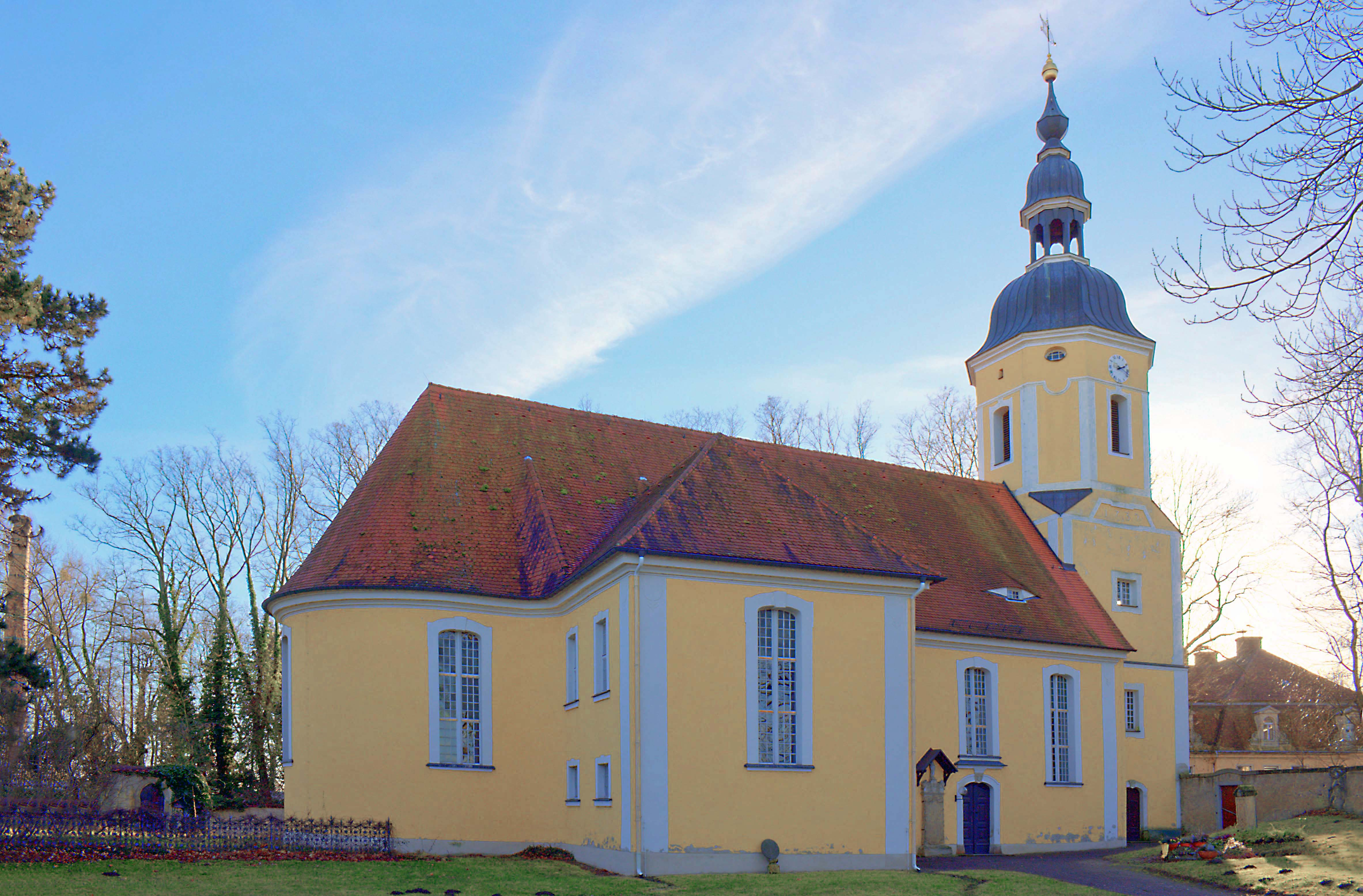
Börln Church

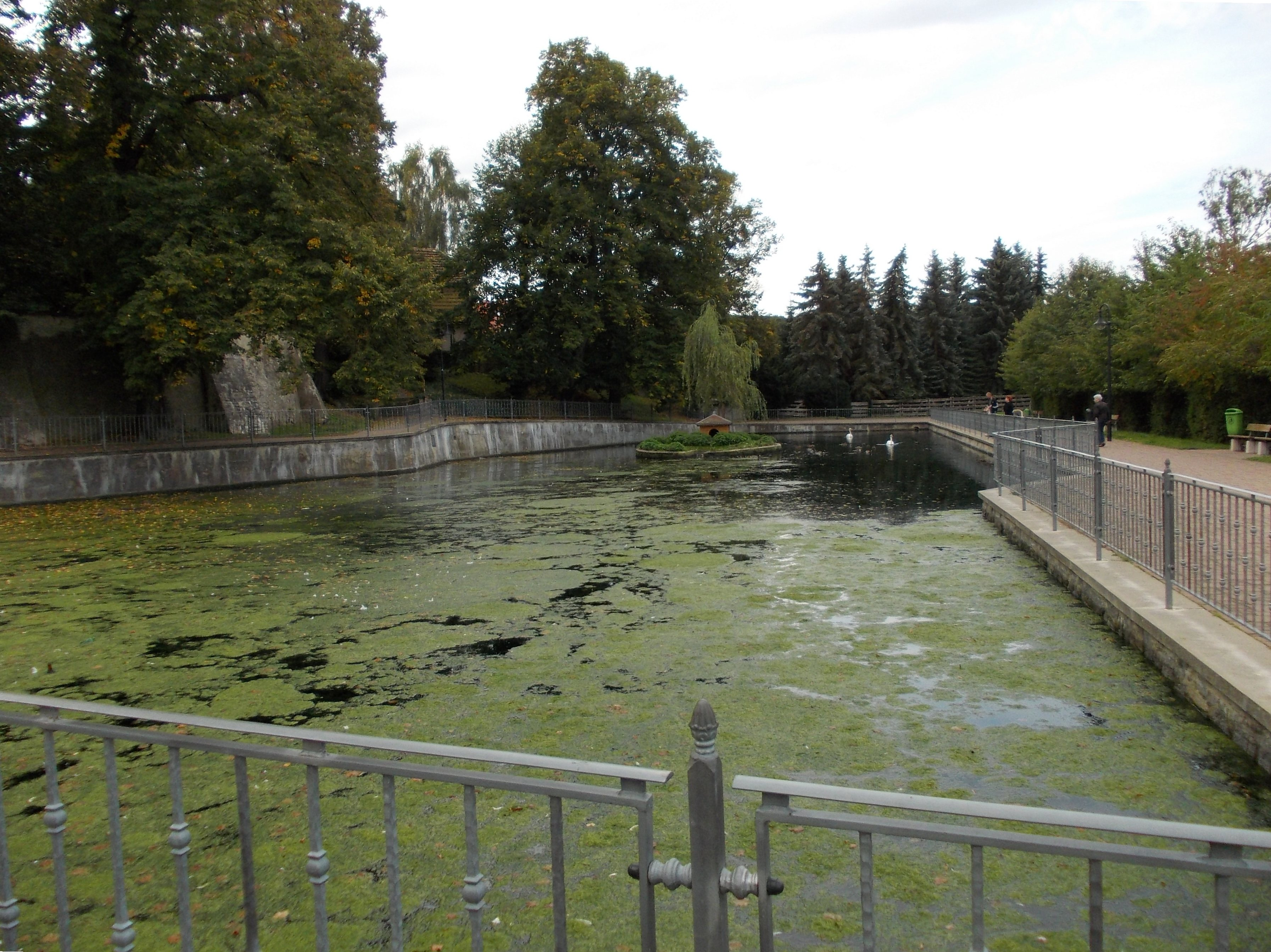
Dahlen Swan pond

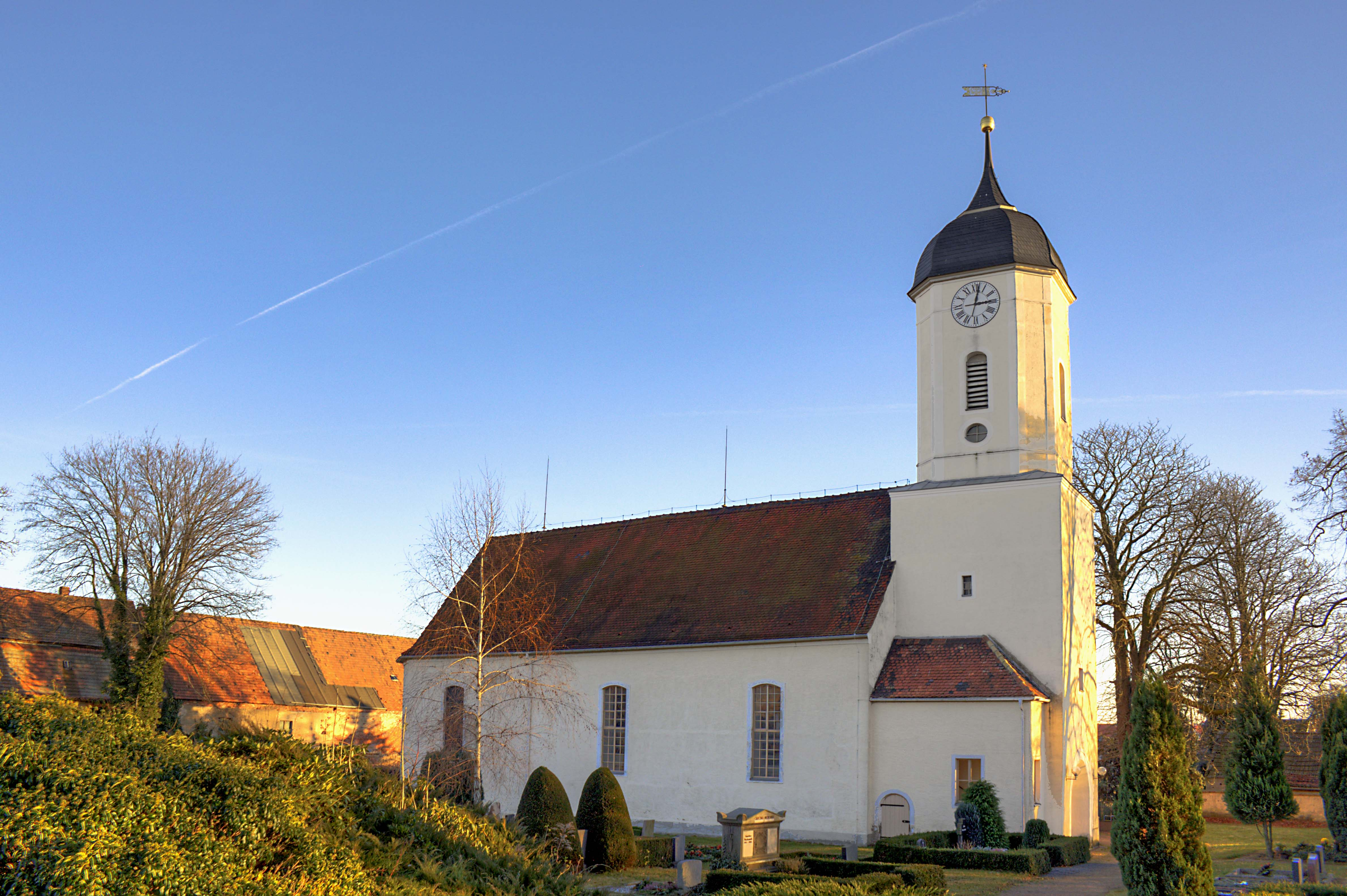
Großböhla Church

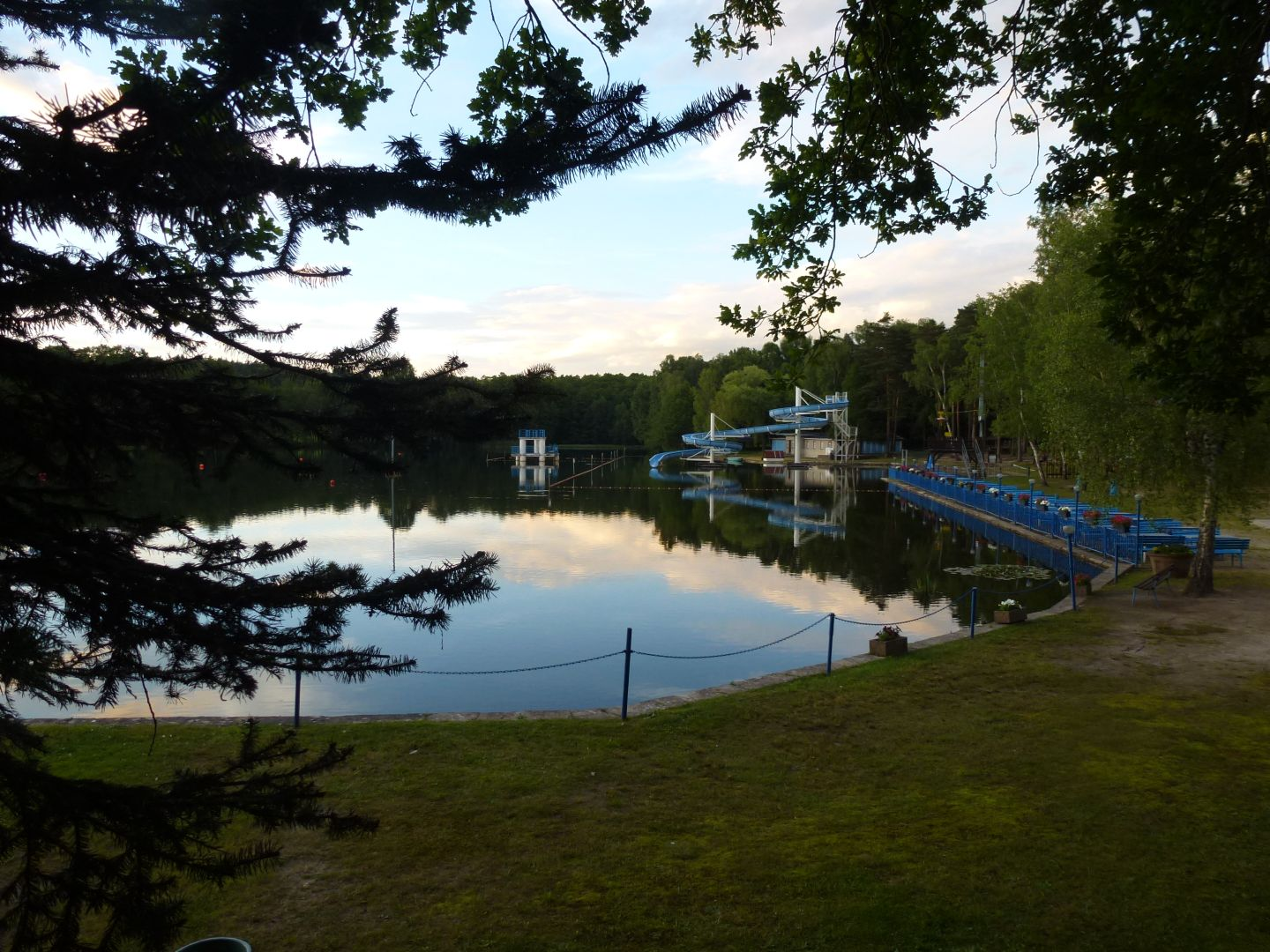
Wood pool Schmannewitz

== Population breakdown ==
Suburbs of Dahlen town
'Burb	Population
Dahlen	2.653
Großböhla, Kleinböhla, Neuböhla	431
Schmannewitz	596
Ochsensaal	187
Börln, Bortewitz, Schwarzer Kater (Black Tomcat), Radegast	630
Dahlen total	4.497

Population on 31 January 2012

== History ==
The history of Dahlen can be traced back to around 1188 A.D, where it is first mentioned as a town along the old trading route Via Regia. The name Dahlen comes from the Slavic "Dolane" meaning "Valley Inhabitant". The city was officially chartered 40 years later in 1228.

There were many setbacks in the development of the town. It had faced the challenges of city fires, plagues, war and famine. However, its location allowed economic recovery where traders passed through and the town had bounced back from these disasters.

The town also saw a boom when the railway was laid to the south. The old Train Station had the "King's Waiting Room" which, in 2013, was converted into public toilets. Here, the Kings of Saxony would stop and rest on their way to the hunting lodge, baroque castle Schloss Hubertusburg in Wermsdorf where there is no rail link. The station's former inn, the oldest railway inn in Germany, was demolished in 2011 and turned into parking spaces.

The current Town Hall (Germ: Rathaus) was built in 1888 on Market Square in the center of town.

The town played an important role during the Seven Years' War in Europe. The most significant event was the signing of the Treaty of Hubertusburg on 21 February 1763 in the castle's White Salon.

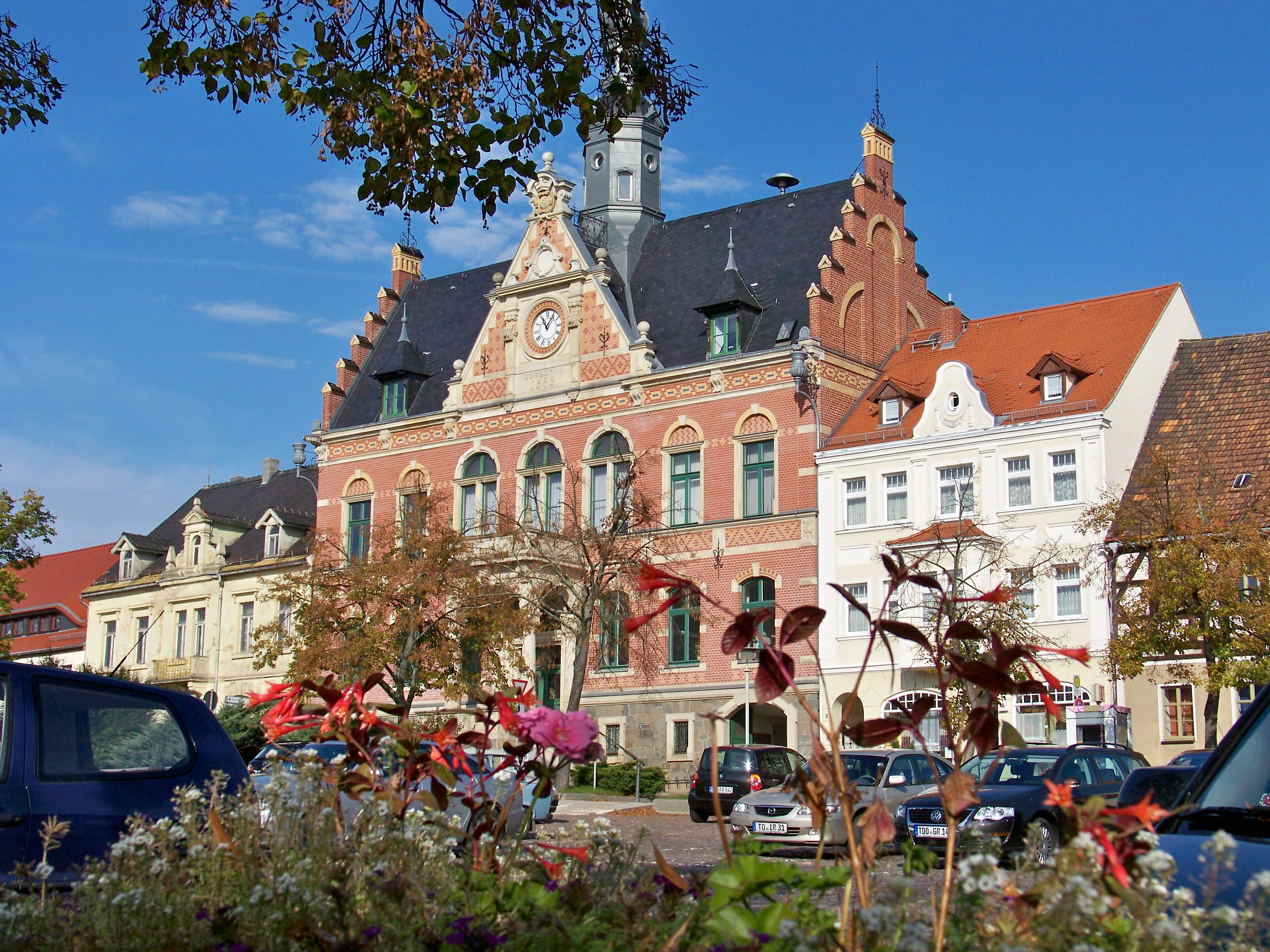
Dahlen Town hall

== Dahlen Castle ==
The highlight of Dahlen is the ruins of the former Dahlen Castle. Built by Heinrich Graf von Bünau (on land left to him by his heiress wife Augusta Helena von Döring who died in 1728) between 1744–1751, the castle was originally one of the residences of the von Bünau family and latterly of the Sahrer von Sahr-Schönberg family which lost all its possessions due to expropriation and banishment without compensation by the post-war communists in 1945. It was completely gutted by fire in 1973, just after it had been fully restored. The insurance compensation was misappropriated by the then regime to build a new catering school in Brandenburg.

Today the castle, owned since the 1990s by the town, is being maintained to a limited extent as a ruin by a group of preservationists. There is no intention to rebuild it.

The town also features many historical sites and sights, and may well become a popular tourist destination.

== Personality ==
=== Sons and daughters of the town ===
- Christoph Gottlob Heinrich (1748-1810), historian
- Karl Friedrich Böhmert (1797-1882), priest and philologist
- Joachim Helbig (1915-1985), pilot

=== People with connection to Dahlen ===
- George Bähr (1666-1738), architect of the Baroque, his main work is the Frauenkirche in Dresden
- Heinrich Graf von Bünau (1697-1762), statesman and historian, landowner in Dahlen
- Wilhelm Rühle (1906-1993), organ builder and master carpenter, built 1977 the organ in the church in Schmannewitz
