= Collmberg =

Mountain in Germany

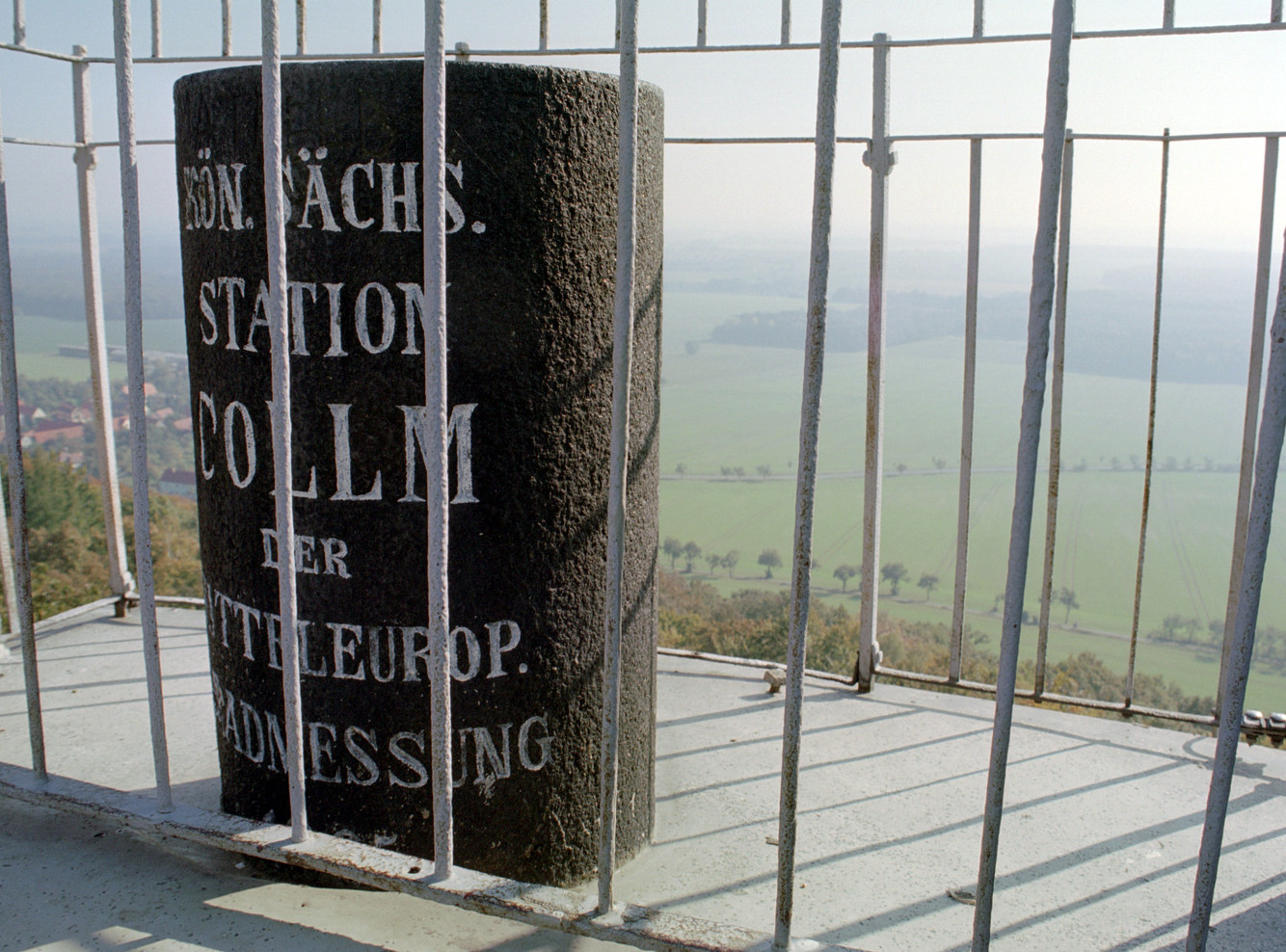
- View from the lookout tower with a pillar of Grade measurement

Highest point
- Elevation: 312 m (1,024 ft)
- Coordinates: 51°18′13″N 13°00′38″E

Geography
- Location within Saxony
- Location: Saxony, Germany
- Parent range: Collmrücken

Collmberg (Sorbian chołm - "Hill, mound“), regionally and colloquially called Collm, is the highest elevation in the Nordsachsen district and of the Northwest Saxon Basin, situated 6 km west of Oschatz near the small village of Collm. Until the 19th Century it was also called Spielberg and has also been known as Oschatzer Collm.

Its height is 312.8 metres above sea level (NHN), although map data vary between 312 m and 318 m depending on the source. Collmberg is a landmark in Wermsdorf Forest.

== Geology ==
Collmberg consists chiefly of quartzitic Greywacke originating from the Ordovician more than 500 million years ago, also of quartzite and conglomerates. The hill was shaped in the Pleistocene epoch. Collmberg is the site of the oldest known exposed rocks in Northern Saxony. Its Greywacke can be traced towards East-northeast across the neighbouring hills until Weinberg hill near Borna and Käferberg hill near Zaußwitz.

About 1 km east of Collmberg lies Windmühlenberg (251 m a. s. l., also called Spitzcollm due to its pointy shape) and further east, north of Striesa village, Eichberg (175 m a. s. l.). These, together with some less prominent hills, form a ridge called Collmrücken.

== History ==
A medieval hill fort on top of the mountain has been dated archeologically to the epoch of 900 to 930 C. E., but no historical documentation exists. An earthen wall encloses an area of 200 m length and 100 m width, and there are also three more walls on the western slope.

Another walled fort, called Altes Schloss, is situated between Collm and Hubertusburg castle.

Claims that Collmberg was the meeting place of the Misnian governing assembly between 1185 and 1259 can not be substantiated, it is more likely that the meetings took place in the nearby village Collm.

Already John George I, Elector of Saxony had the idea of building a tower on Collmberg, but the Thirty Years' War prevented execution of the plans.

A monument was to be erected on Collmberg on occasion of the 60th anniversary of the regency of King Frederick Augustus I of Saxony in 1823, containing a portrait bust of the ruler as a personal homage, but the king did not approve of this purpose. A monument to Frederick Augustus I was only erected after his death in Dresden.

Collmberg and its wooded surroundings were a traditional hunting ground for the Saxon prince-electors and their guests, with yearly hunts for boar in the 18th century.

Innkeeper Lettau from Calbitz started to sell beer from a mobile installation on Collmberg around 1840 and had a restaurant built a few years later after obtaining approval from the government. The observation tower opened in 1854. A residential house and a farm building, a concert hall and associated buildings were also erected, furthermore an enclosure for deer, roe deer, and rabbits.

The Geophysical Observatory of Leipzig University was moved to Collmberg in 1932 and was extended in 1935 by a seismographic station.

After 1945 Collmberg was declared a restricted military area. The abandoned restaurant was pulled down in 1967.

A radio tower was erected in 1960 and replaced in 2004.

== Observation tower ==
An observation tower, was built in 1851–1853 and opened on 24 April 1854. It was named Albertturm after Prince Albert, later King Albert of Saxony. It is 18 m tall and was built with three stories. A staircase with 99 steps, initially outside and only turning inside in the upper story, leads to the observation platform. Weather permitting, it allows views towards Leipzig, the Petersberg north of Halle (Saale), Augustusburg and the Ore Mountains, Saxon Switzerland and Landeskrone near Görlitz.

Due to the excellent views from the tower, Collmberg was selected as a first-order point of the 1865 arc measurement. A stone pillar used in the campaign still stands on the tower platform.

In the early 1990s the tower was found to be dilapidated. It was closed in 1994 by the state forest administration who had new steel beams put in and the concrete cover renewed. The community of Wermsdorf bought the tower in 2010 for 300 EUR from the Saxon state.

== Geophysical observatory ==
The geophysical observatory of Leipzig University was built 1927–1932 using fonds provided by Rockefeller Foundation. There, earthquakes are continuously recorded by seismographs, and the wind velocities in the upper atmosphere are measured. Ludwig Weickmann was the first scientific director of the observatory.

A mechanically coupled horizontal pendulum for measurements of the inclination of the Earth's surface was constructed here by Heinz Lettau in 1936–1937. The continuous seismic measurements, performed since 1932, helped to investigate claims of a German nuclear test on 2 October 1944.

The wind velocities in the upper atmosphere were calculated from measurements of the signal strength of the longwave transmitters in Zehlendorf bei Oranienburg (177 kHz), Solec Kujawski (Radio Polonia, 225 kHz) and Topolná (Radiojurnal, 270 kHz) with three receivers in close proximity. The observatory can register earthquakes worldwide with Richter magnitudes of 4.8 or more. Since 1993 it is part of a regional seismometric network with 16 uniformly equipped stations that was established in the early 1990s. The high sensitivity of the Collmberg seismographs allows to record minute surface movements resulting from underground explosions, quarry blasts, or rock bursts.

== Radio towers ==
A 64 m (90 m with aerial) tall relay tower for radio links was built on Collmberg in 1960. It became known as Sender Oschatz. It was replaced in 2004 by a 100 m tall radio tower which unlike the old tower does not have operation rooms in its upper parts. The redundant structure was pulled down in 2005. Amateur radio repeater stations with the callsigns DB0SAX and DM0SAX are also located on the hill.
