= Oschatz =

- Municipality
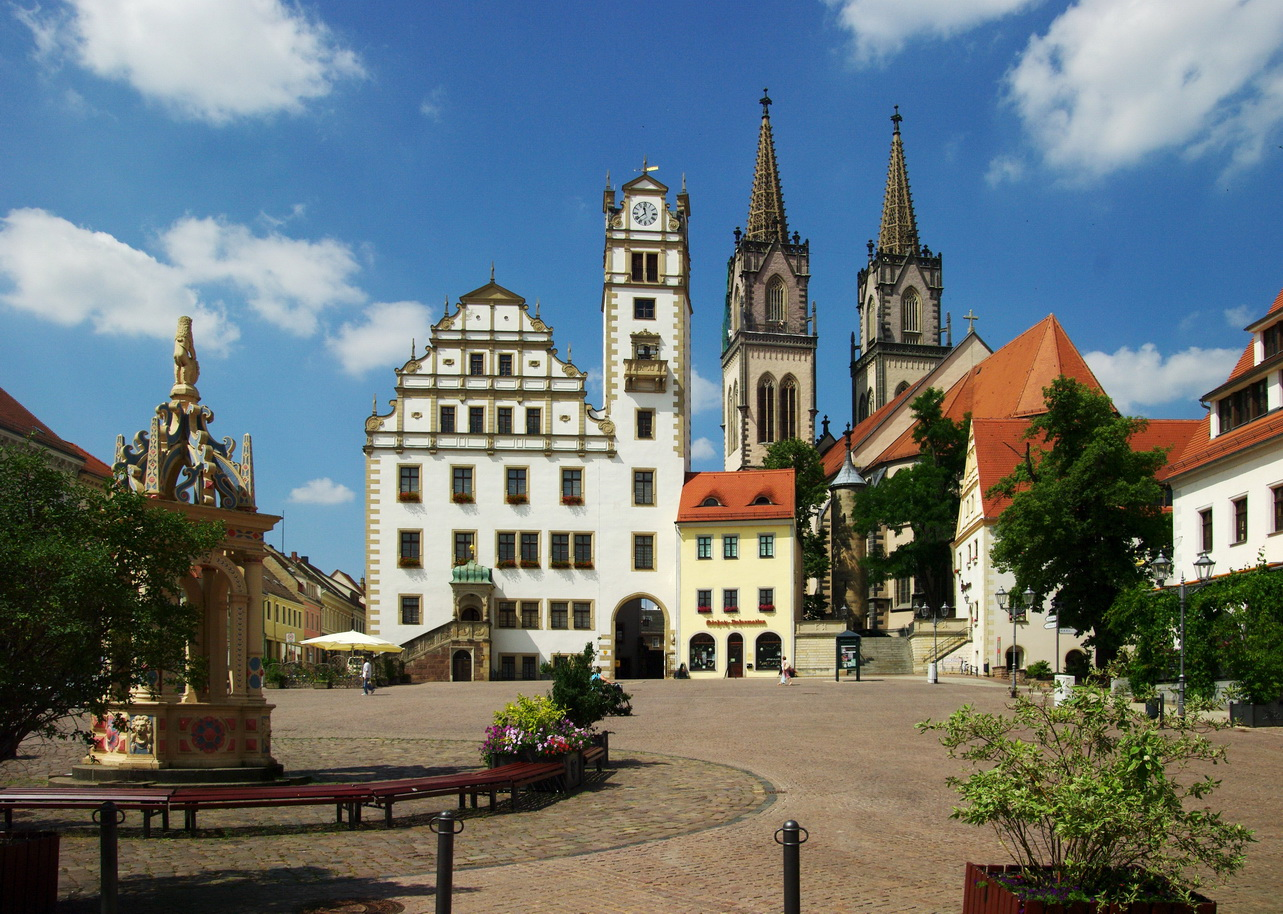
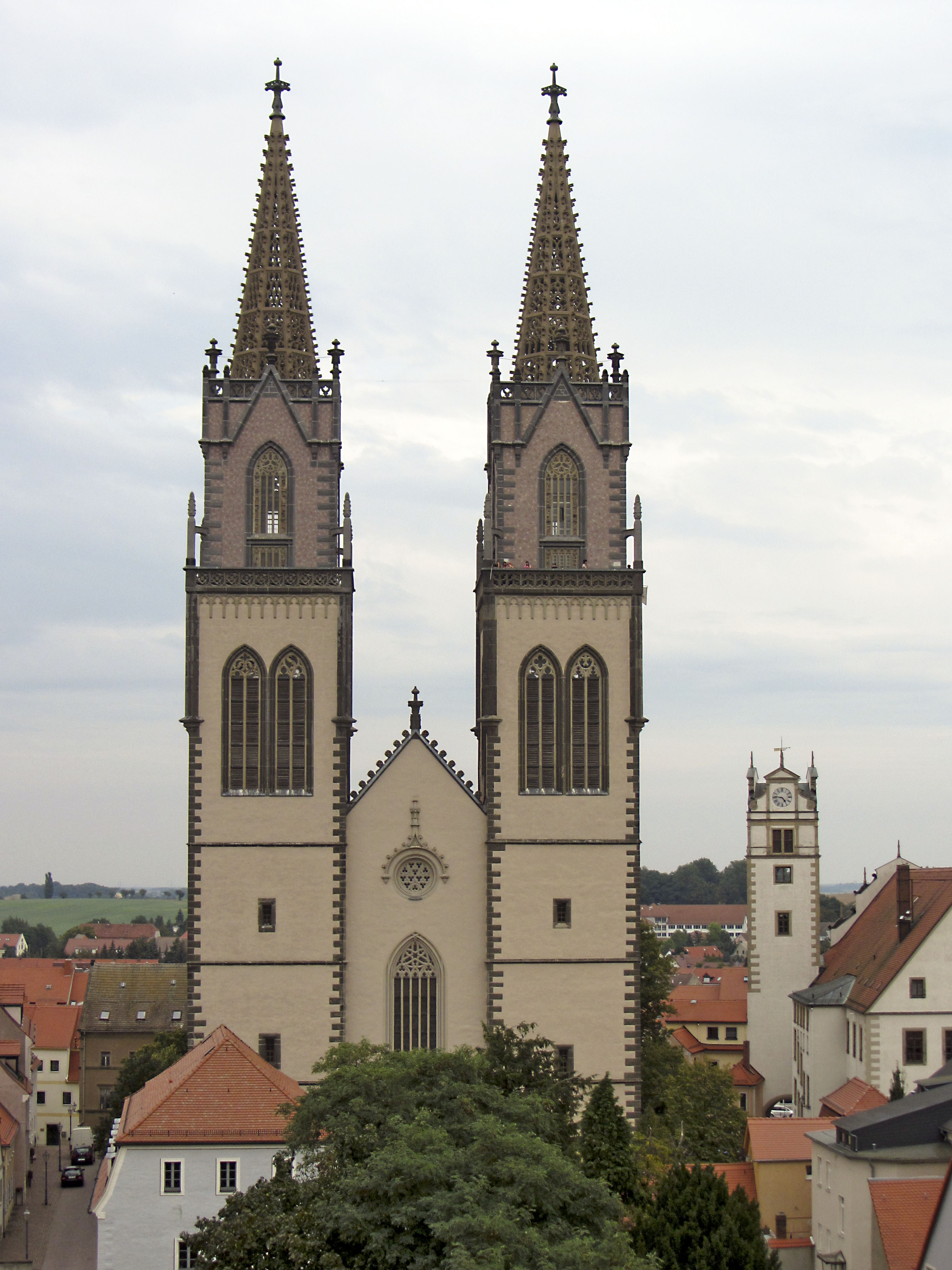
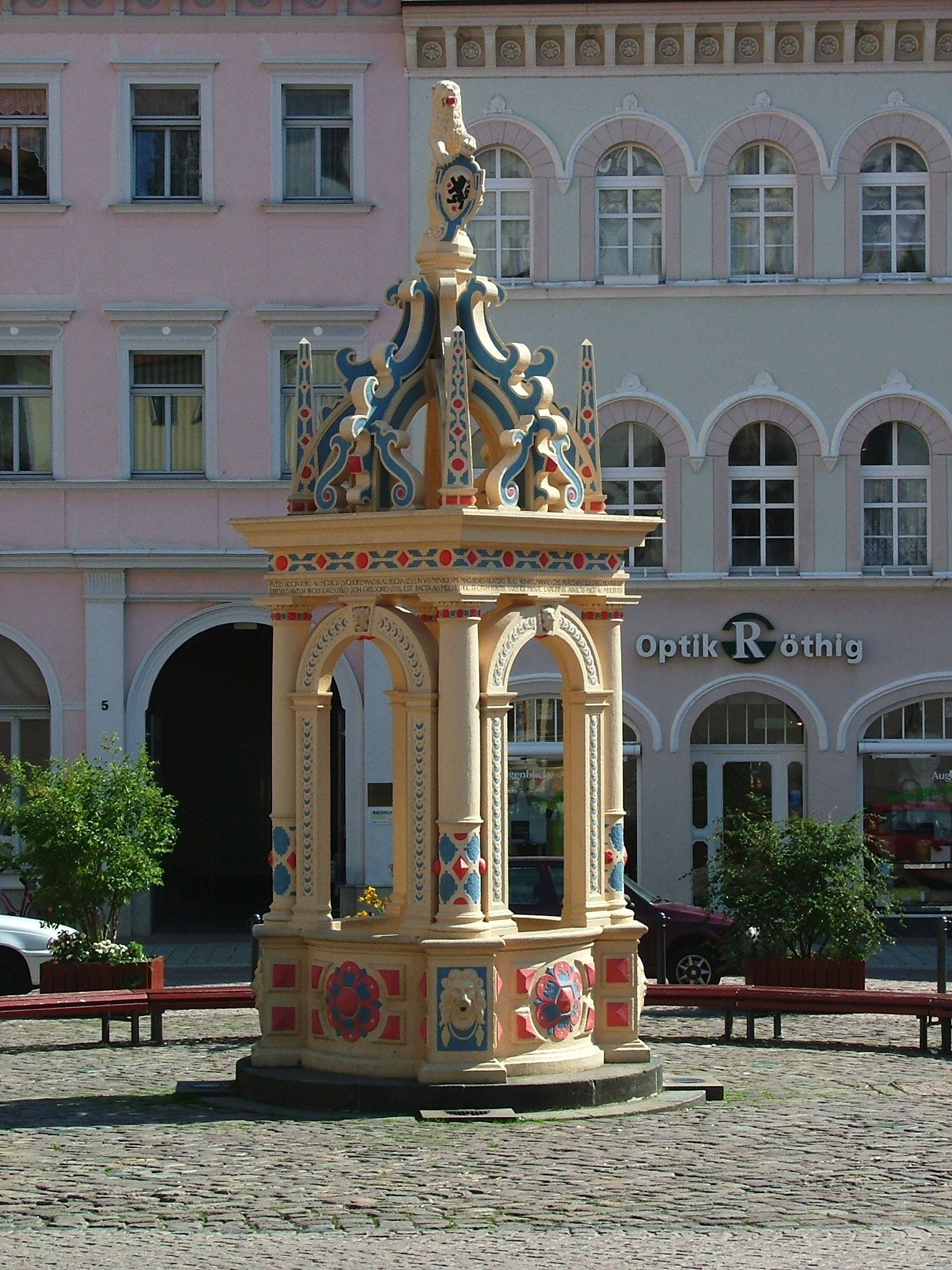
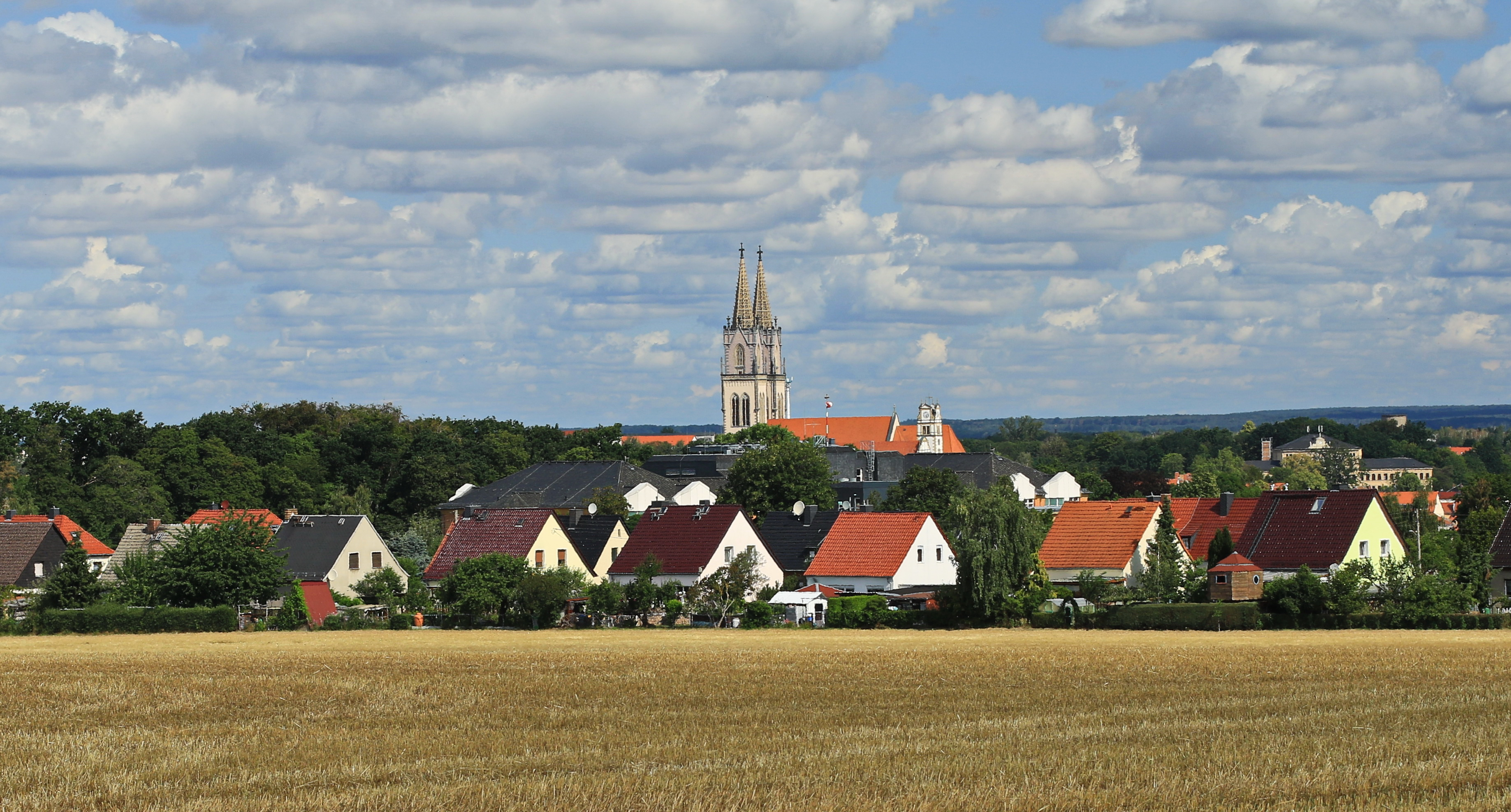
- Market with town hall, St. Aegidien church and water well St. Aegidien church Water well of 1589 at 'Neumarkt' market square Skyline

- Coat of arms

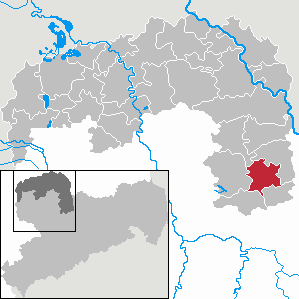
- Location of Oschatz within Nordsachsen district
- Interactive map of Oschatz
- Location within Germany Location within Saxony
- Coordinates: 51°18′1″N 13°6′26″E
- Country: Germany
- State: Saxony
- District: Nordsachsen

Government
  - Mayor (2022–29): David Schmidt (Ind.)

Area
  - Total: 55.44 km^{2} (21.41 sq mi)
- Elevation: 120 m (390 ft)

Population (2025-12-31)
  - Total: 14,136
  - Density: 255.0/km^{2} (660.4/sq mi)
- Time zone: UTC+01:00 (CET)
  - Summer (DST): UTC+02:00 (CEST)
- Postal codes: 04758
- Dialling codes: 03435
- Vehicle registration: TDO, DZ, EB, OZ, TG, TO
- Website: www.oschatz.org

Oschatz (German: [ˈoːʃats]) is a town in the district Nordsachsen, in Saxony, Germany. It is located 60 km east of Leipzig and 60 km west of Dresden.

== Geography ==
=== Site and climate ===
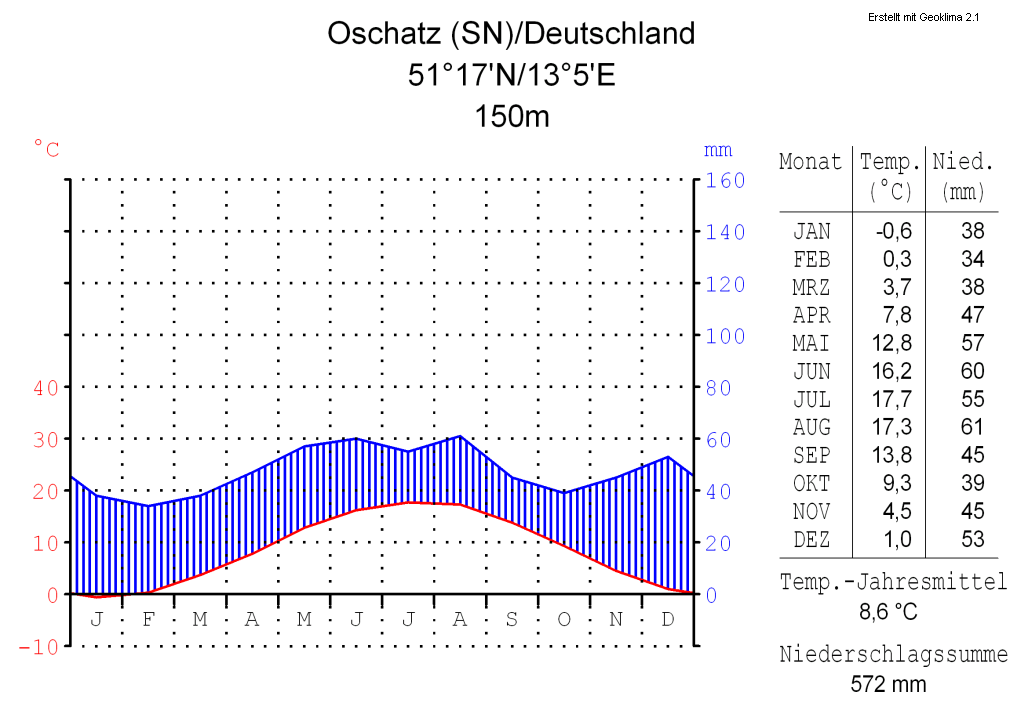
Climate diagram for Oschatz

Oschatz lies in the Saxon Lowland and is located on the river Döllnitz, which joins the river Elbe as a left tributary 15 km away near Riesa. Oschatz is situated near the forested regions of the Dahlener Heath as well as the Wermsdorf Forest and the Collmberg. Neighboring districts include: Liebschützberg, Strehla, Riesa, Stauchitz, Naundorf, Wermsdorf and Dahlen.

The average air temperature in Oschatz is approximately 8.6 °C, the annual rainfall is about 570 millimeters.

Climate data for Oschatz (1991–2020 normals)
Month	Jan	Feb	Mar	Apr	May	Jun	Jul	Aug	Sep	Oct	Nov	Dec	Year
Mean daily maximum °C (°F)	3.7 (38.7)	5.1 (41.2)	9.2 (48.6)	15.0 (59.0)	19.5 (67.1)	22.9 (73.2)	25.3 (77.5)	25.1 (77.2)	20.0 (68.0)	14.4 (57.9)	8.2 (46.8)	4.7 (40.5)	14.4 (57.9)
Daily mean °C (°F)	2.3 (36.1)	2.8 (37.0)	5.7 (42.3)	9.6 (49.3)	13.4 (56.1)	16.2 (61.2)	18.5 (65.3)	18.1 (64.6)	14.2 (57.6)	9.9 (49.8)	6.0 (42.8)	2.7 (36.9)	10.0 (50.0)
Mean daily minimum °C (°F)	−2.0 (28.4)	−1.6 (29.1)	0.9 (33.6)	4.0 (39.2)	7.9 (46.2)	11.4 (52.5)	13.5 (56.3)	13.3 (55.9)	9.7 (49.5)	5.8 (42.4)	2.0 (35.6)	−0.6 (30.9)	5.4 (41.7)
Average precipitation mm (inches)	43.7 (1.72)	32.2 (1.27)	42.3 (1.67)	32.0 (1.26)	52.8 (2.08)	53.4 (2.10)	74.4 (2.93)	63.9 (2.52)	49.2 (1.94)	43.0 (1.69)	47.4 (1.87)	44.3 (1.74)	578.5 (22.78)
Average precipitation days (≥ 1.0 mm)	16.8	14.1	15.3	11.3	12.6	12.5	14.0	12.9	11.9	13.3	15.2	16.5	166.4
Average snowy days (≥ 1.0 cm)	9.7	8.0	3.8	0.3	0	0	0	0	0	0	1.6	5.7	29.1
Average relative humidity (%)	83.9	80.8	77.3	71.1	71.3	71.0	69.0	70.1	76.7	82.3	86.1	85.2	77.1
Mean monthly sunshine hours	60.5	81.9	126.8	186.7	224.4	225.3	233.2	214.5	160.2	116.4	67.0	53.8	1,750.7
Source: World Meteorological Organization

== Subdistricts ==
The administrative district of the town Oschatz also contains the following 14 townlands:

- Kleinforst
- Altoschatz
- Fliegerhorst
- Leuben
- Limbach
- Lonnewitz
- Mannschatz
- Merkwitz
- Rechau
- Schmorkau
- Striesa
- Thalheim (with Saalhausen and Kreischa)
- Zöschau
- Zschöllau

== History ==
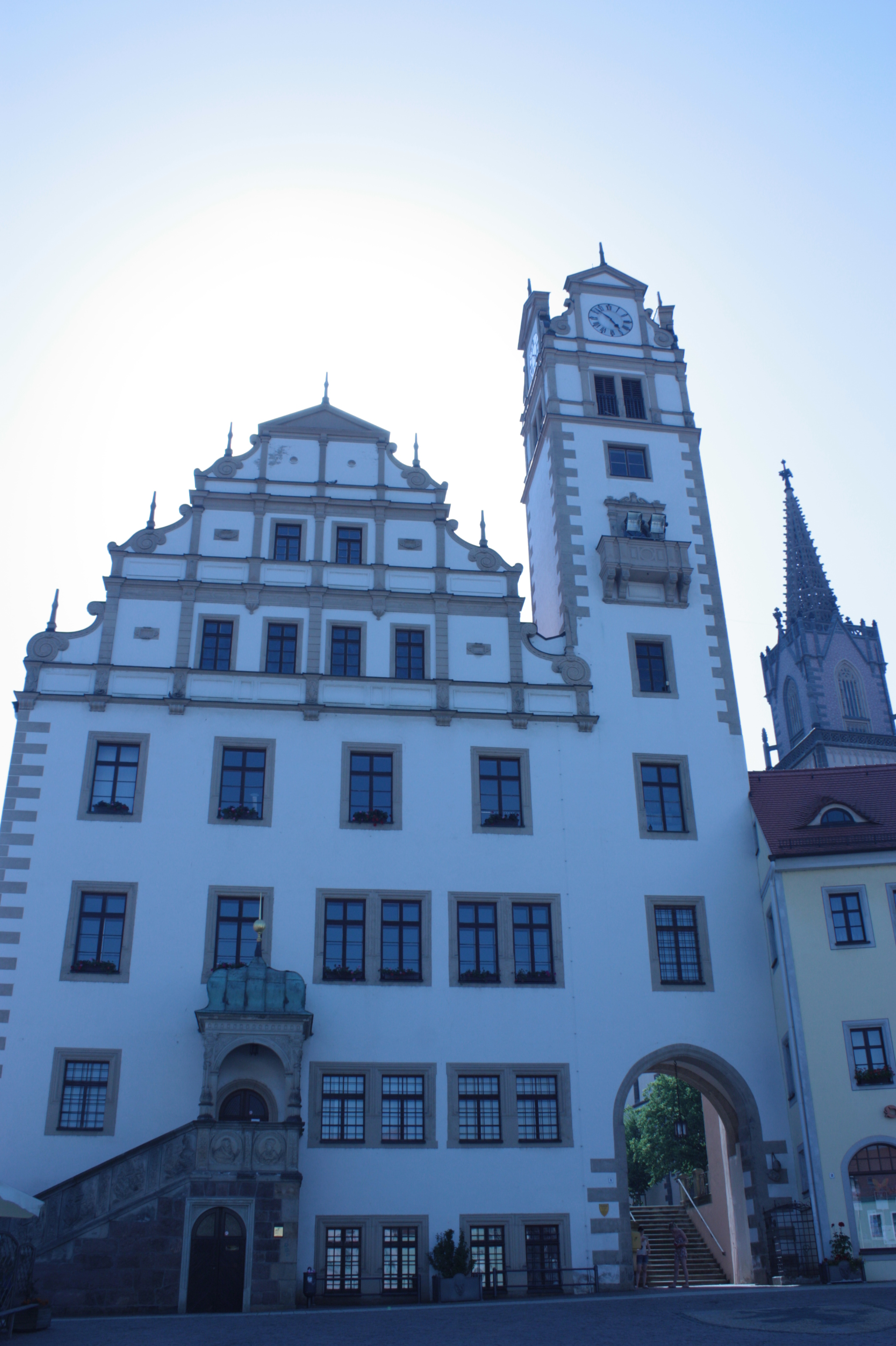
Town Hall in Oschatz

=== Early times to 18th century ===
The area of the present-day town has been settled since Neolithic times. The name Oschatz derives from the Sorbian word for abatis. The first written mention was in 1200 as a name "Johannes de Ozzetz", however the association to Oschatz is uncertain. The first definite mention of the town dates from 1238, as Ozzechz is mentioned in a document from the Henry III, Margrave of Meißen. The oldest document found in the town archive is an indulgence letter from Bishop Conrad of Meißen, dated 1246. In 1344 the people's army The Geharnischten certified for the association of towns Oschatz, Torgau and Grimma, and a schoolmaster was employed in 1365. A fort in Oschatz was first mentioned in 1377, and a watch tower was erected at the site of the current museum. The town received market rights in 1394.

The town hall was built in the Market Square in 1477. In 1478 the town was awarded its own jurisdiction by the local rulers. The current town hall was built between 1538 and 1546. During the Reformation Oschatz, like many towns in the region, turned Protestant. There are still letters from Luther, Melanchthon and Justus Jonas in the town archives.

Plague killed 900 of 3000 inhabitants in 1566.

Oschatz was scene of a witchcraft trial in 1583. Leonhard Sihra was convicted of sorcery and was hanged.

In 1616 the town experienced a fire which destroyed 440 houses and storehouses.

=== 19th century to modern times ===
==== Population development ====
Date	Population
1995-12-31	18,360 (est.)
2001-12-31	17,102 (est.)
2011-05-09	15,164 (census)
2011-12-31	14,991 (est.)

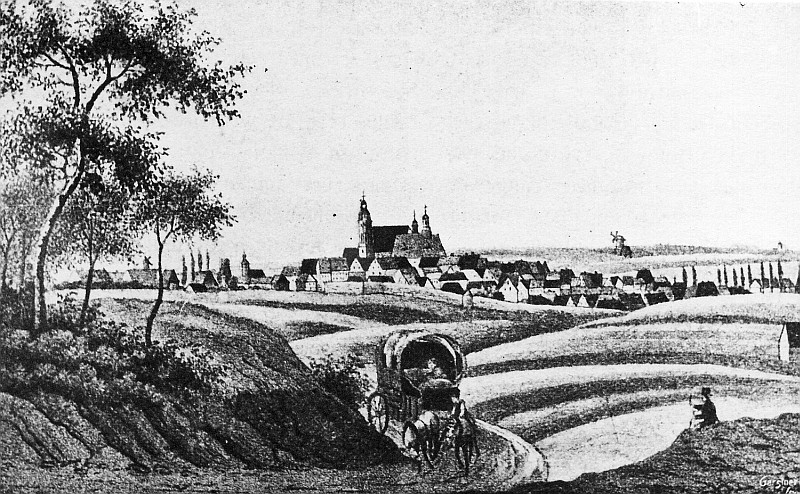
Oschatz in 1830

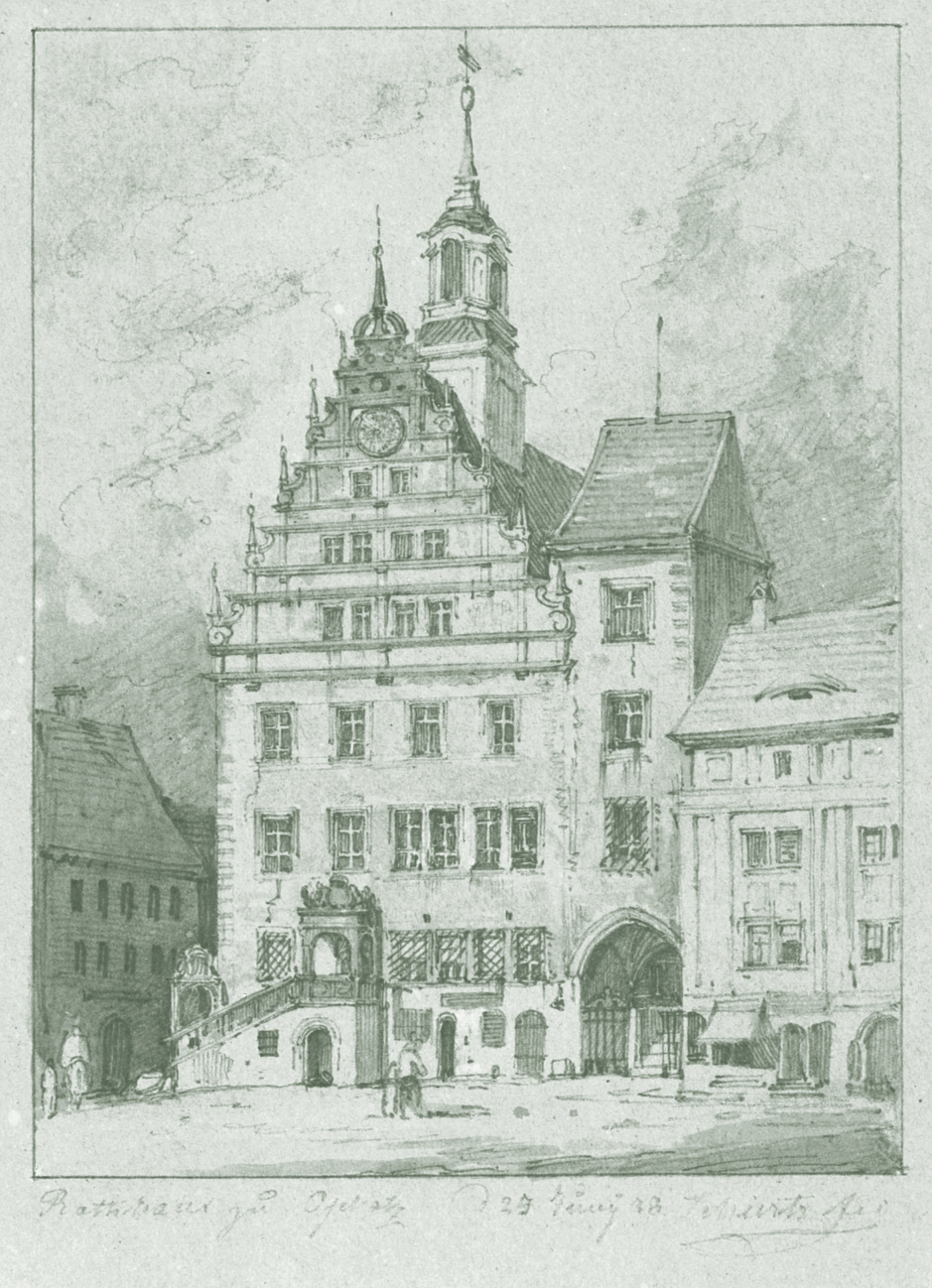
Oschatz Town Hall 1838

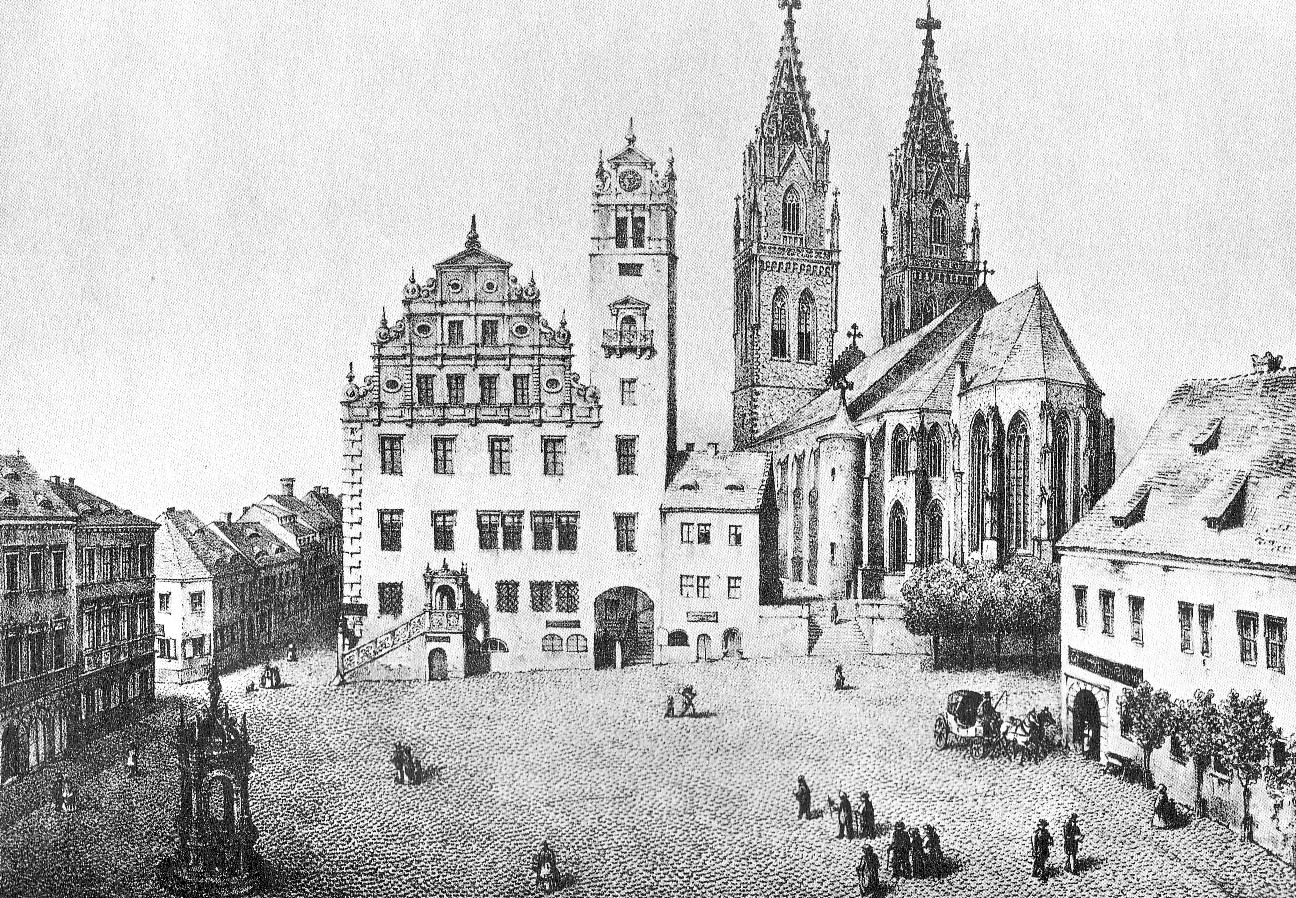
View in 1850

== Architecture and monuments ==
Notable buildings:

- The 16th century town hall, rebuilt after the 1842 fire
- The 19th century neogothic St.-Aegidien-Kirche, with two 75 m high towers
- The 13th-15th century Klosterkirche, the only remaining building of the Franciscan monastery
- several 16th and 17th century buildings on the Neumarkt square

Monuments:

- Monument in the town park to the victims of Fascism with an additional memorial plaque for French Resistance fighters, which was erected in 1984.
- Graves and a memorial stone in the graveyard beside the chapel for 19 female predominantly Jewish Concentration Camp prisoners, who were on a death march from one of the subcamps of Buchenwald when they died in April 1945.
- Memorial at the corner of Leipziger Platz and Friedrich-Naumann-Promenade in memory of the overnight stay of Ernst Thälmann, the chairman of the KPD before he was interned in Bautzen prison.
- Plaque on the house at Strehlaer Straße 5, also in memorial of Thälmann.

== Economy and infrastructure ==
=== Transport ===
Oschatz has a connection to the A14 autobahn via the exits Mutzschen, Leisnig or Döbeln-North. The Bundesstraße 6 goes through the town and the Bundesstraße 169 is few kilometres distant and connects with the A14 as well as the towns of Döbeln (towards Chemnitz) and Riesa (towards Cottbus).

=== Tourism ===
In the historic center the hotel and restaurant 'Zum Schwan' is located, one of the oldest inns in Saxony, founded in 1458. Oschatz is situated at the Via Regia, a centuries old trade route, recognised as Cultural Route of the Council of Europe.

Several historical monuments and other places of interest can be found in the old town.

Oschatz is the terminal station of the narrow gauge Döllnitzbahn.

The city hosted the 2006 Saxon Garden Exhibition (Landesgartenschau) and since that time has renovated and upgraded its landscape park, called O-Park.

== International relations ==
Oschatz is twinned with:

- Blomberg, Germany
- Filderstadt, Germany
- Starogard Gdański, Poland
- Třebíč, Czech Republic
- Vénissieux, France

== People ==
- Constantine Hering (1800-1880), physician and homeopath
- Melanie Müller (born 1988), German television personality
