= Hubertusburg =

Rococo palace in Germany

Coordinates: 51°16′39″N 12°56′23″E

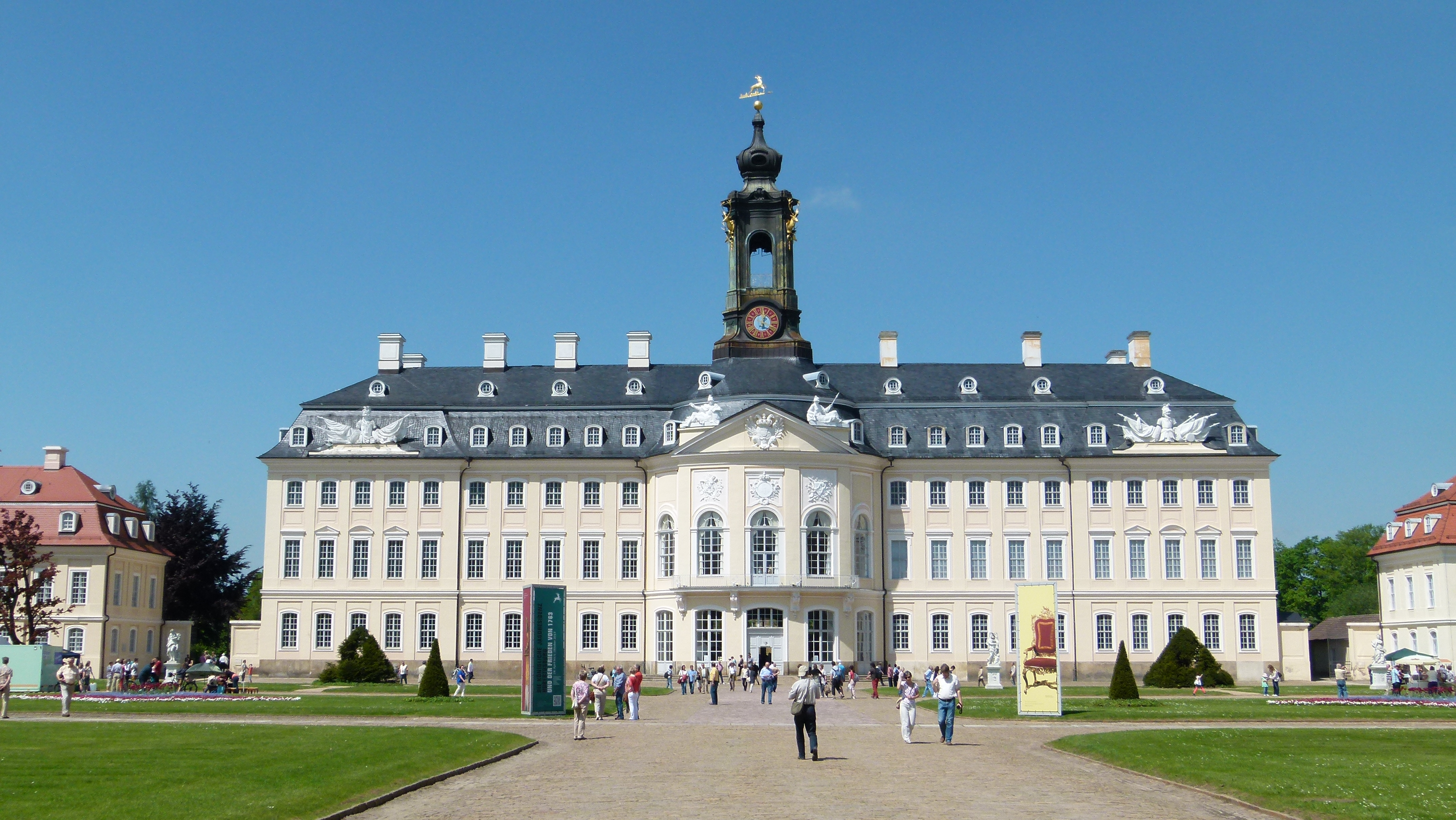
Main façade

Hubertusburg is a Rococo palace in Saxony, Germany. It was built from 1721 onwards at the behest of Augustus the Strong, Elector of Saxony and King of Poland, and after his death served as a residence of his son Augustus III. The 'Saxon Versailles' is chiefly known for the signing of the 1763 Treaty of Hubertusburg that ended the Seven Years' War. The palace is located in the municipality of Wermsdorf near Oschatz.

== History ==
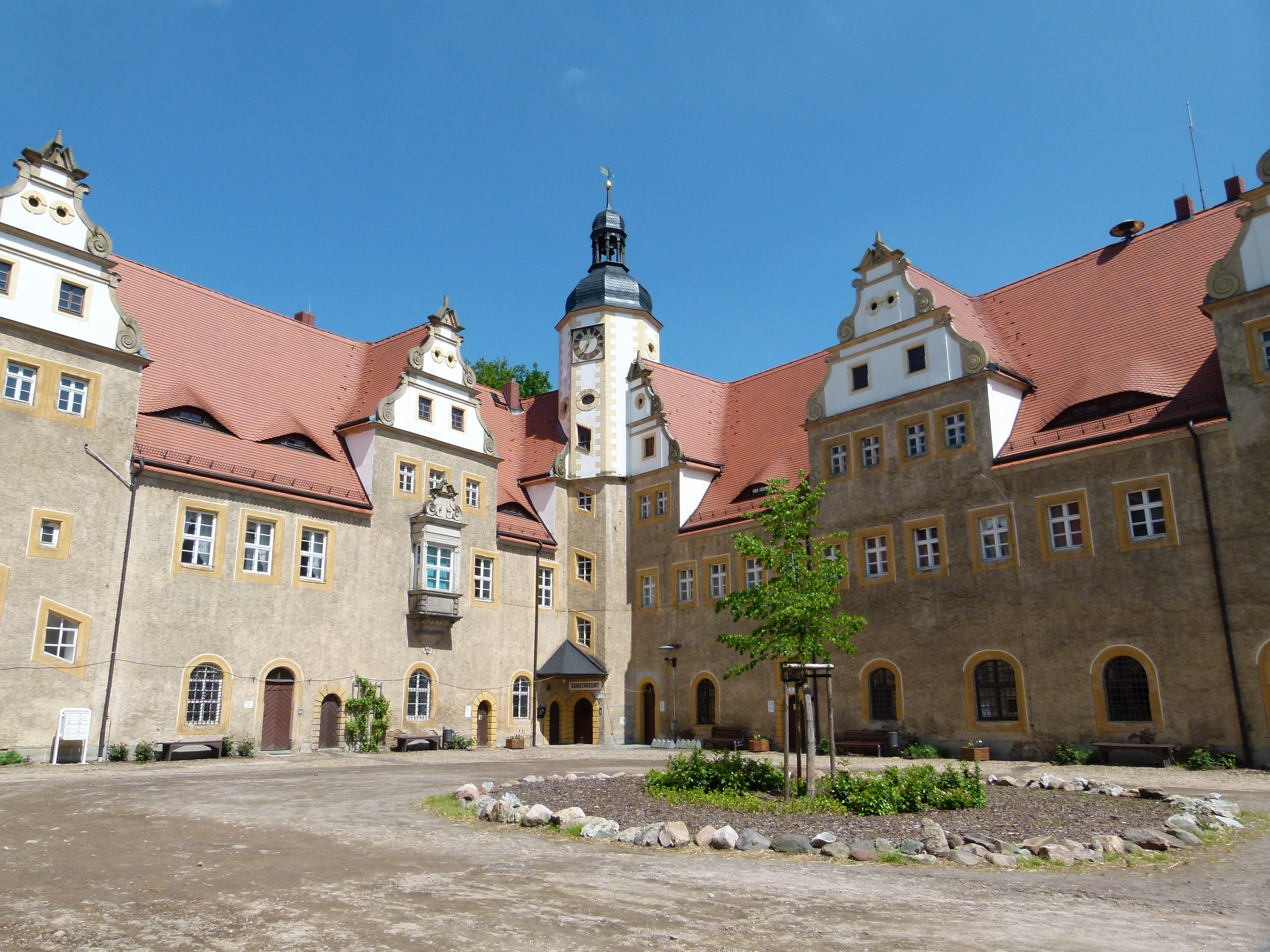
Wermsdorf hunting lodge

The extended Wermsdorf Forest had already been a hunting ground for the Wettin elector Augustus in the 16th century. A first Renaissance hunting lodge (Jagdschloss) in Wermsdorf was erected in 1609–10. From 1699 Augustus the Strong and his governor Prince Anton Egon of Fürstenberg held festive parforce hunts here, while their large entourage and the royal guests had to be accommodated in the village and at nearby Mutzschen Castle.

During the feast of Saint Hubertus on 3 November 1721, Augustus the Strong commissioned a new palace that should serve as a hunting lodge but also reflect the royal claims of the Saxon elector, who since 1697 ruled as King of the Polish-Lithuanian Commonwealth in personal union. The palace, then one of the largest Baroque castles in Europe, was erected according to plans drawn up by the court architect Johann Christoph von Naumann. It was completed after only three years of construction in 1724. Naumann had designed a plain triple-wing complex with a cour d'honneur centered around an avant-corps and crowned by a mansard roof. Integrated in the building was a castle chapel – as expression of Augustus' conversion to the Catholic faith, to be eligible for the Polish throne. New roads were laid out from the palace to Meissen and the Dresden residence, as well as to the city of Leipzig in the northwest.

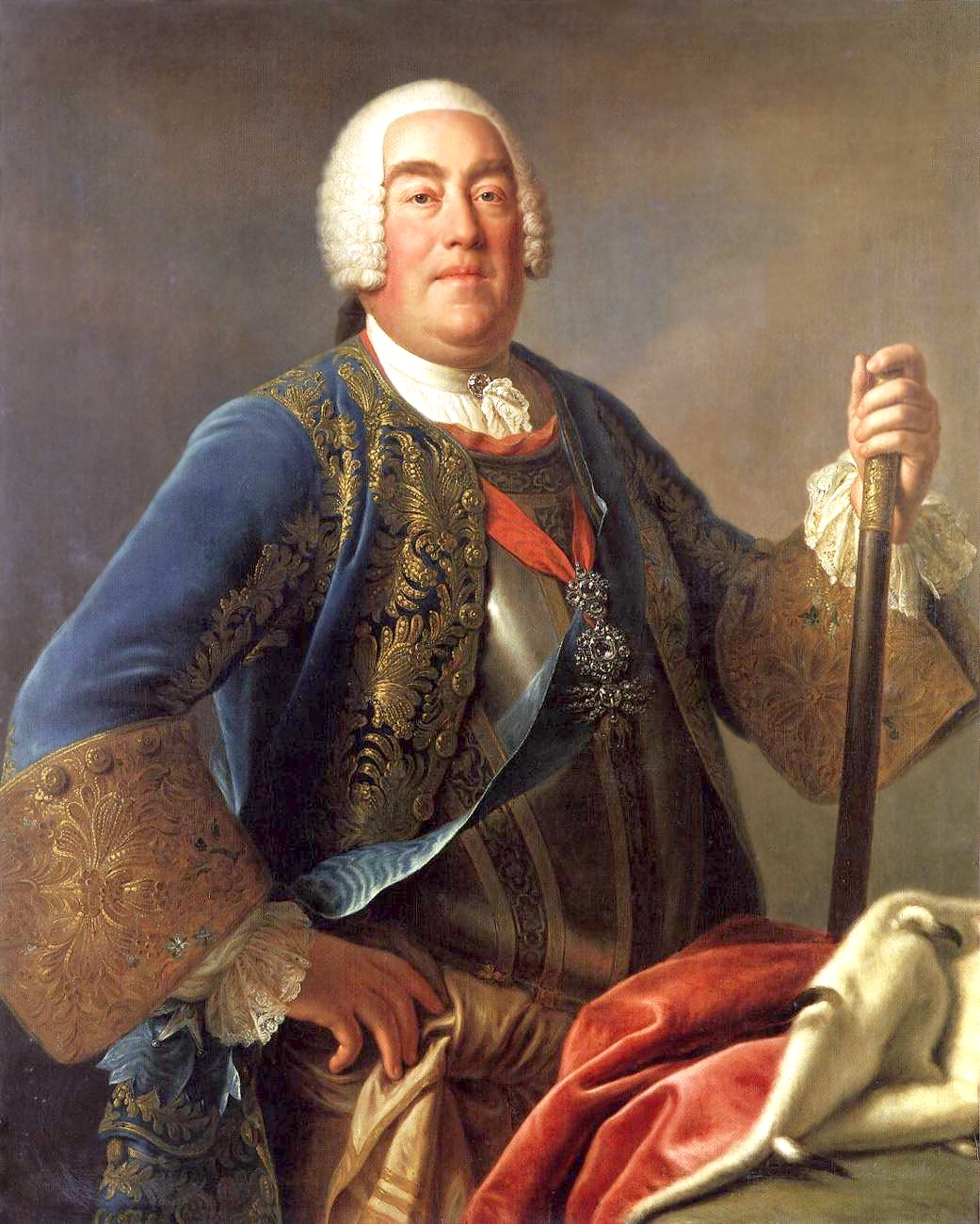
King Augustus III, 1755 portrait by Pietro Rotari

After the death of Augustus the Strong in 1733, his son and successor Augustus III had Hubertusburg rebuilt in a Rococo style and again greatly expanded until it got its present appearance in 1752. The three-story structure now formed a rectangle, with the main façade including an oval two-story avant-corps and bearing the coat of arms of Augustus III as imperial vicar. The roof received a distinct canopy crowned by an onion dome and a weather vane with a jumping stag. Attached to the main palace extended functional buildings and stables were erected, grouped around a vast courtyard. The Saxon prime minister Heinrich von Brühl had his own palais in the right wing, embodying his special position at the court. From 1755 Brühl, though no great huntsman, served as commander of the Hubertusburg court hunts having his own cuisine and employees at his disposal. Hubertusburg was often the scene of extravagant parties and festivities. The last Hubertus feast was celebrated in 1755, before the outbreak of the Seven Years' War.

With the advance of the Prussian Army in 1756, Augustus III and Brühl fled to Warsaw, leaving Queen consort Maria Josepha and her children behind. After his defeat at the 1760 Battle of Landeshut, the forces of King Frederick the Great devastated Dresden, while Berlin and nearby Charlottenburg Palace was occupied and plundered by united Austrian, and Russian and Saxon troops. Furious Frederick ordered the plundering of Hubertusburg in revenge, however, his general Johann Friedrich Adolf von der Marwitz (according to other sources Friedrich Christoph von Saldern) refused to act. He was consequently dismissed and replaced by Frederick's confidant Karl Gottlieb Guichard, who executed the command. The decorations and inventory – except for the court chapel – were exploited by the Berlin court Jews Veitel-Heine Ephraim and Daniel Itzig.

The palace is famous for the Peace Treaty of Hubertusburg signed here after lengthy negotiations in the next year, on 15 February 1763. After the plundering, furnishings had to be removed from several inns in the vicinity for the accommodation of the representatives of the belligerent powers. Ratified by Frederick the Great and Empress Maria Theresa, the Treaty of Hubertusburg, with the Treaty of Paris, ended both the Seven Years' War and the French and Indian War. Augustus III died shortly afterwards on October 5; his son and heir Frederick Christian only outlived him by a few weeks. When Elector Frederick Augustus III of Saxony ascended the throne, he had Hubertusburg Place secured and rebuilt in a simplified manner.

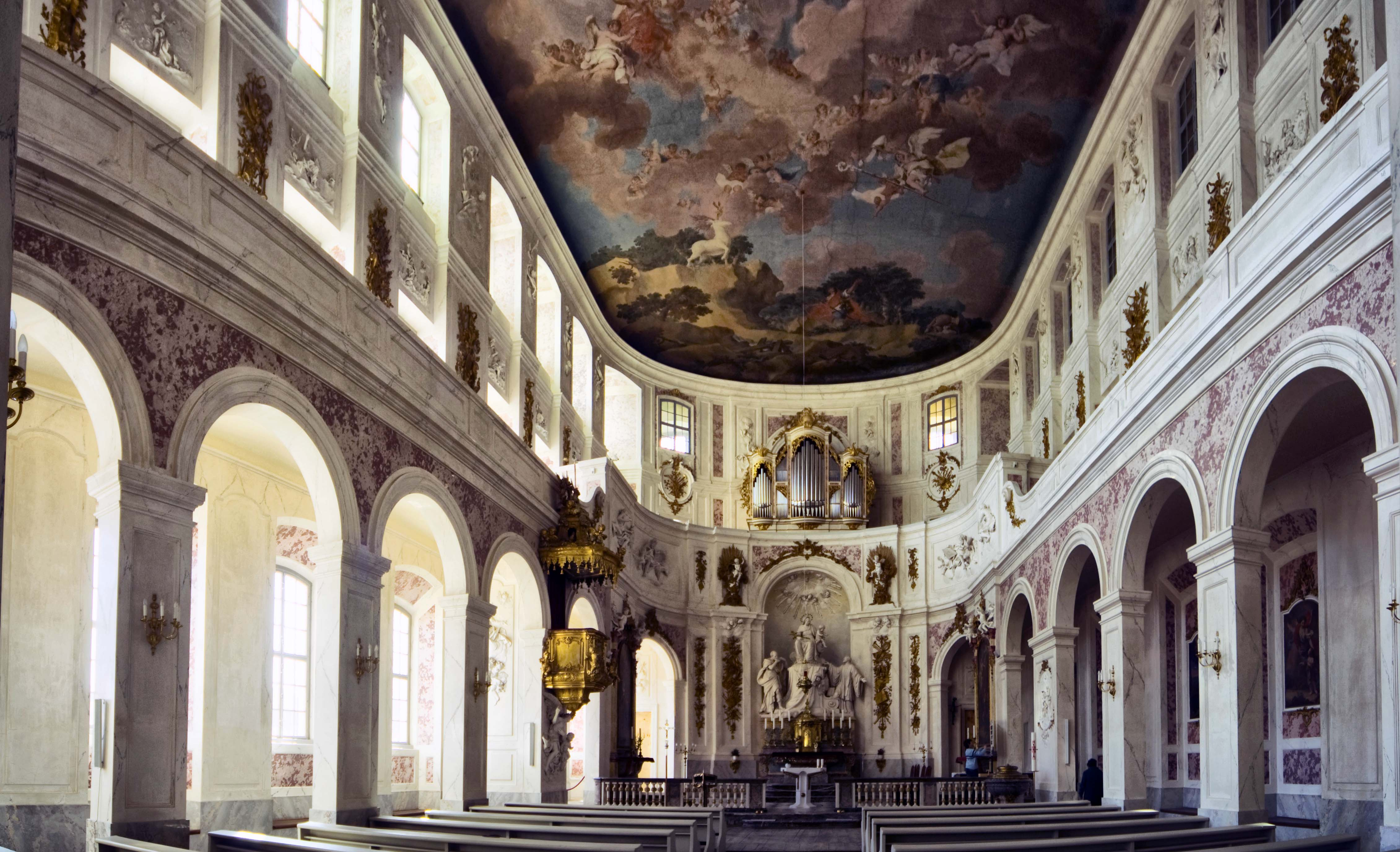
Court chapel interior

Nevertheless, the days of Hubertusburg as the site of ecstatic court festivities were over. In 1770 Frederick Augustus III had a faience manufacture established in the premises, which obtained much attention at the Leipzig Trade Fair and later produced stoneware with considerable success. However, business went down during the Napoleonic Continental Blockade, while Hubertusburg served as a military hospital for the Saxon troopers of the Grande Armée, returning from the French invasion of Russia, and for the wounded of the Battle of Leipzig. From 1815 onwards, Frederick Augustus again held some royal hunts here.

In 1840, Hubertusburg was turned into a penitentiary for up to 170, mainly female, inmates. From 1872 to 1874, the Social Democratic leaders August Bebel and Wilhelm Liebknecht were kept prisoner here, shortly before the institution was abolished. Other parts of the palace complex served as a state hospital from 1838, from 1850 also as a lunatic asylum for women and children, a school for the blind, as well as a training school for nursing sisters. A hospital run by the Klinikum St. Georg, Leipzig still exists on the south side of the Hubertusburg grounds. During World War II, the Luftwaffe established a military academy here, which was occupied by advancing US Army forces on 25 April 1945. Handed over to the Soviet Red Army on 5 May, the premises were again plundered and several remaining hospital patients deported to NKVD Special Camp Mühlberg.

Since the German reunification, the premises have been gradually renovated by the Free State of Saxony. Parts are used by the workshops of the Saxon state archive, where records salvaged from the collapsed building of the Cologne Historical Archive are repaired. The palace grounds are open to the public as a tourist destination; the interior can be visited by taking part in guided tours.

== See also ==
- List of Baroque residences
