= Döllnitz =

River in Germany

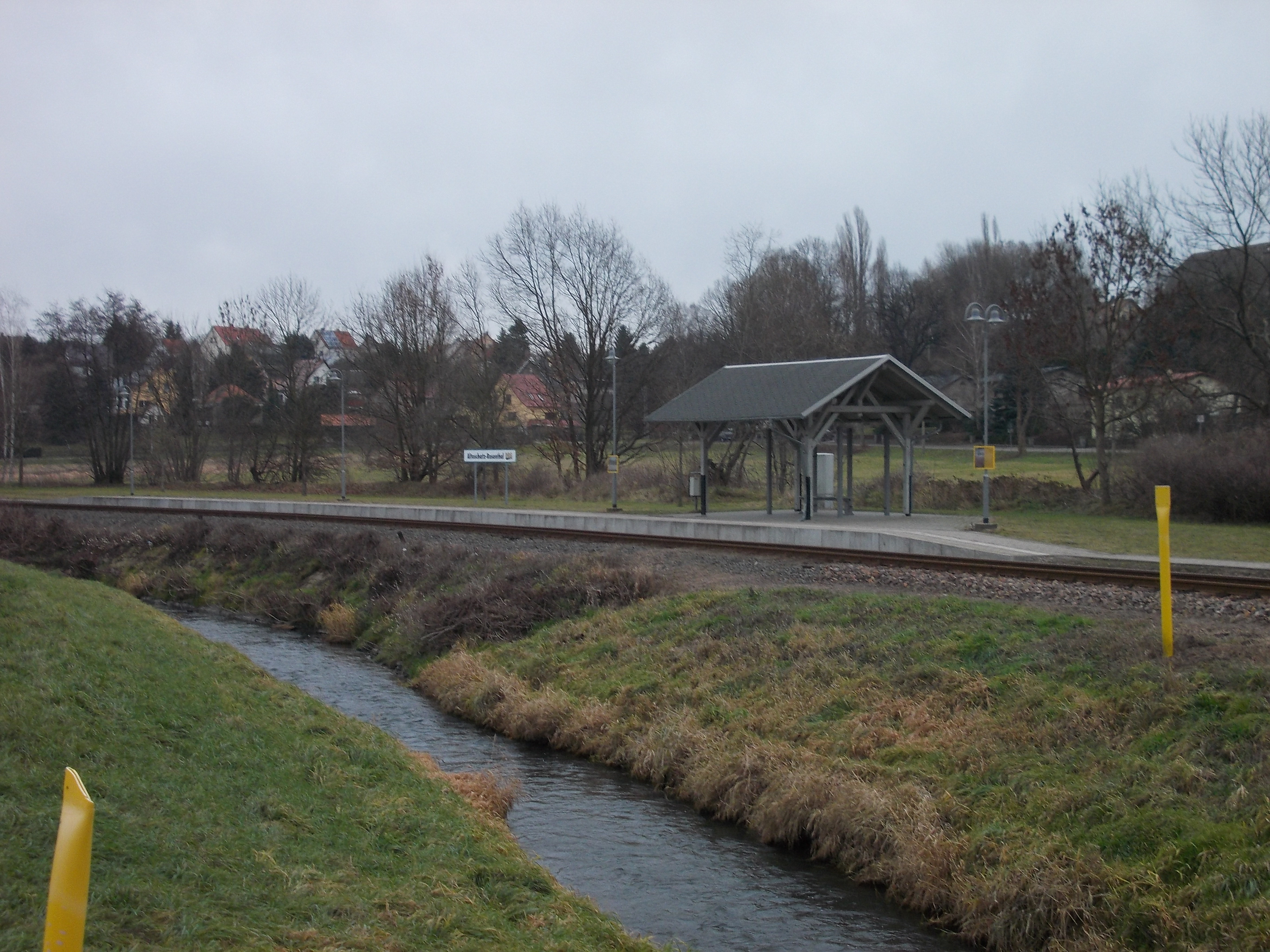

Location
- Country: Germany
- State: Saxony

Physical characteristics
- Mouth
  - location: Elbe
  - coordinates: 51°19′13″N 13°17′27″E
- Length: 45 km (28 mi)

Basin features
- Progression: Elbe→ North Sea

The Döllnitz is a river of Saxony, Germany. It flows through the towns Mügeln and Oschatz, and joins the river Elbe in Riesa.

It has 3 dams between 35.8 and 38.2 km point. They're called the Döllnitzsee dam, the Döllnitzsee fore-dam and the Göttwitzsee. There are 136 waterways along it including bridges and more (as of 2006).

== See also ==
- List of rivers of Saxony
