= Gailingen am Hochrhein =

- Municipality
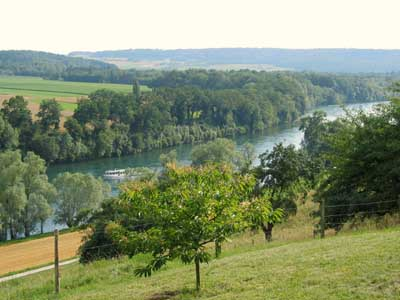
- Rhine at Gailingen

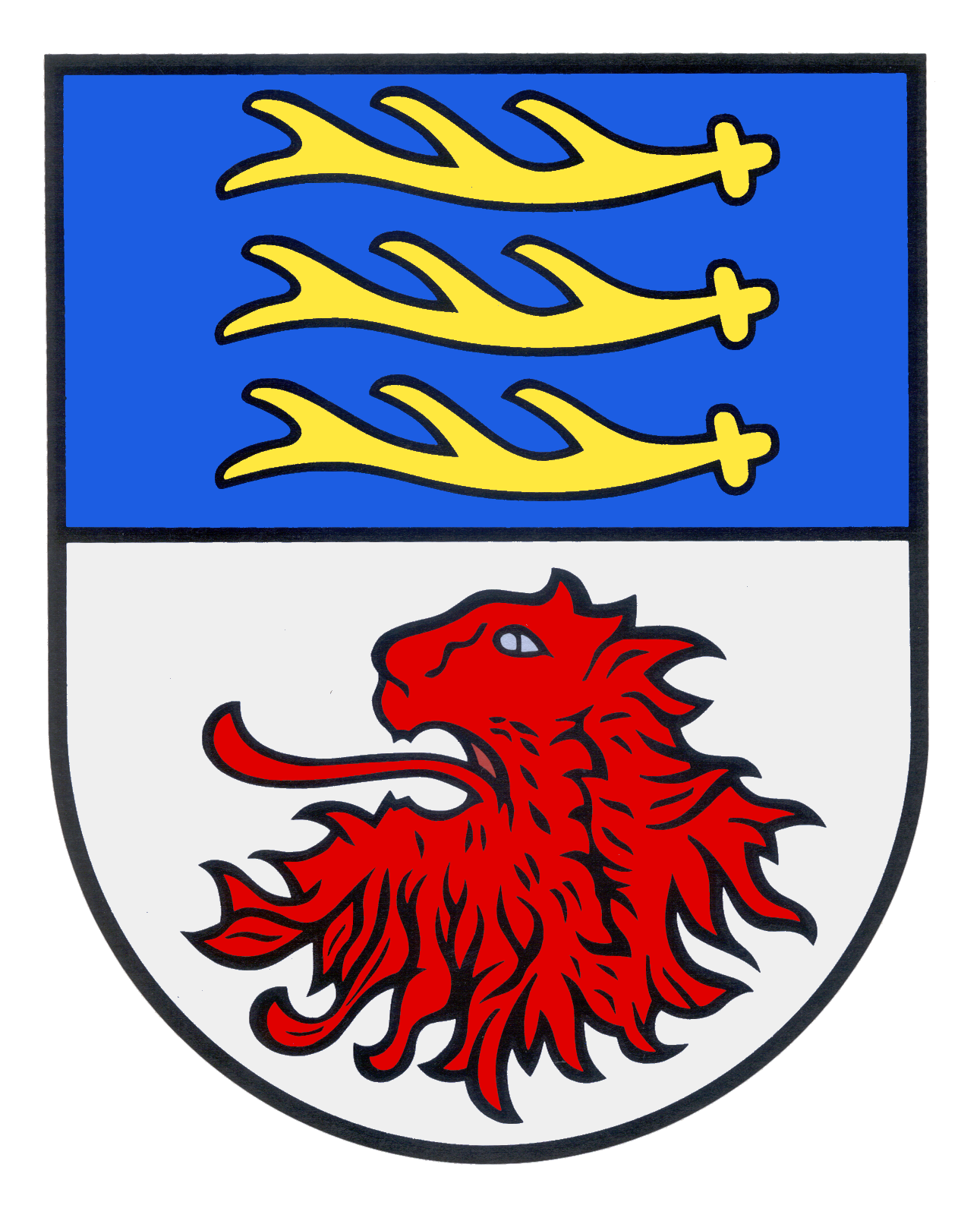
- Coat of arms

- Location of Gailingen am Hochrhein within Konstanz district
- Interactive map of Gailingen am Hochrhein
- Location within Germany Location within Baden-Württemberg
- Coordinates: 47°41′49″N 8°45′18″E
- Country: Germany
- State: Baden-Württemberg
- Admin. region: Freiburg
- District: Konstanz

Government
  - Mayor (2018–26): Thomas Auer

Area
  - Total: 13.18 km^{2} (5.09 sq mi)
- Elevation: 469 m (1,539 ft)

Population (2025-12-31)
  - Total: 3,046
  - Density: 231.1/km^{2} (598.6/sq mi)
- Time zone: UTC+01:00 (CET)
  - Summer (DST): UTC+02:00 (CEST)
- Postal codes: 78262
- Dialling codes: 07734
- Vehicle registration: KN
- Website: www.gailingen.de

Gailingen am Hochrhein (pronounced [ˈɡaɪlɪŋən ʔam ˈhoːxʁaɪn], lit. 'Gailingen on the High Rhine'; Low Alemannic: Gailinge am Hochrhi) is a village in the district of Konstanz in Baden-Württemberg, in southern Germany.

It is situated in a southernmost part of the region of Hegau in a unique location on the northern bank of the High Rhine, just across the border from Switzerland and close to Lake Constance. Its population is currently 3,070.

== History ==
Founded over 1,000 years ago, Gailingen was first mentioned in a document in 965. However the village probably dates back to the 5th century, when the Alamanni settled in the area. The name “Gailingen” literally refers to "the people of Geilo", one of the Alamanni leaders.

In the 11th century, a family of noblemen owned the area and probably erected a castle on the Rauhenberg mountain. The castle is long gone but left its name on that part of the mountain. In the 14th century, ownership was transferred to the former noble family of Randegg, which left its sign of a lion's head in the village's shield.

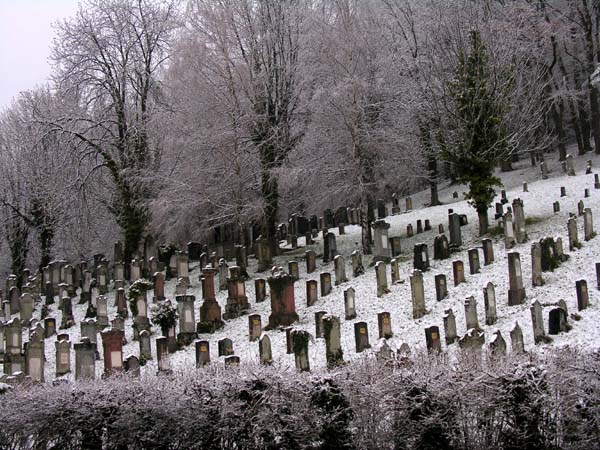
Jewish cemetery in Gailingen

The village changed hands numerous times in the course of the following centuries. In 1540, the neighbouring city of Schaffhausen (in Switzerland) purchased a third of the domain; the other parts were owned by several families, with the Liebenfels family being responsible for the construction of a small castle called “Liebenfelsisches Schloesschen” in 1750.

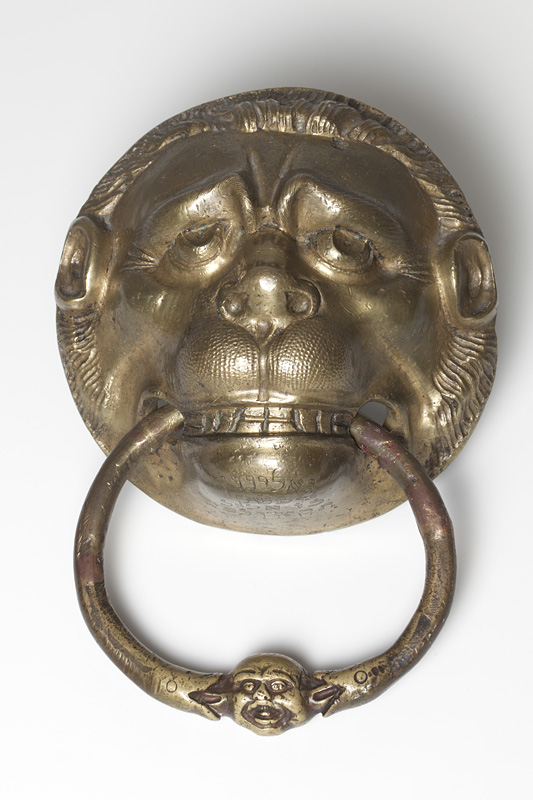
Door knocker from the Gailingen synagogue, 1836, in the collection of the Jewish Museum of Switzerland.

Following the Thirty Year's War, Jews began to settle in Gailingen and the upper Rhine region. The letter of protection from 1657 testifies to six Jewish men and their families living in Gailingen. Later letters of protection show a continuation and growth of the small community. The first document referring to the Jewish cemetery in Gailingen dates back to 1653. A synagogue was built in 1836 and eventually, the community also had a school and community centre, its own hospital and an old people's home.

By 1820, the community had grown to 140 families, making up about half of the population of Gailingen. Despite having no political rights, Jews strongly shaped and influenced Gailingen both culturally and economically. In the mid nineteenth century, they outnumbered the Christian citizens for a short time, after which there was a steady decline in the number of Jews living in Gailingen. This was caused by the introduction of freedom of movement and settlement in Baden in 1862, which led to more Jewish families moving to larger cities in search of better professional and financial opportunities.

In 1870, the village elected its first Jewish mayor. Seven years later both Jewish and non-Jewish children were attending the same school. Members of both faiths were living together peacefully until Hitler's rise to power. In October 1940, the remaining members of the community were deported to the concentration camp in Gurs, thus marking a violent and final end to the Jewish community of Gailingen. The close relationship with neighbouring Switzerland has made Judaica and other remnants of the community find their way to the Jewish Museum of Switzerland, where some of these objects are on display.

== Infrastructure ==
In 1950, Gailingen am Hochrhein became the seat for a rehabilitation clinic, and in 1972, a second one specifically addressing young people followed. A new church and a new school were built as well. What used to be a largely-agricultural village is now a modern one that caters for tourists from all over the world. Its location, clean air, and peaceful surroundings, has caused Gailingen to be awarded the title “national health resort” in 1977.

Südbadenbus serves the village with a bus connection to Büsingen am Hochrhein which is a small exclave belonging to Germany. The bus passes through Swiss territory to reach the main village of Büsingen and the small outlying settlement of Stemmer.

== Twin towns ==
Gailingen am Hochrhein is twinned with:

- Liebschützberg, Germany
