= Wermsdorf Forest =

Forest and landscape protection area in Germany

Coordinates: 51°18′00″N 12°55′00″E

Wermsdorf Forest is a forested area of 13,000 hectares, some of which is a natural park, in the state of Saxony, Germany. It is located near the towns Oschatz, Collm, Wermsdorf, Sachsendorf, Dornreichenbach and Luppa and bisected by Bundesstraße 6. There is a private fishery.
