= Wermsdorf =

- Municipality
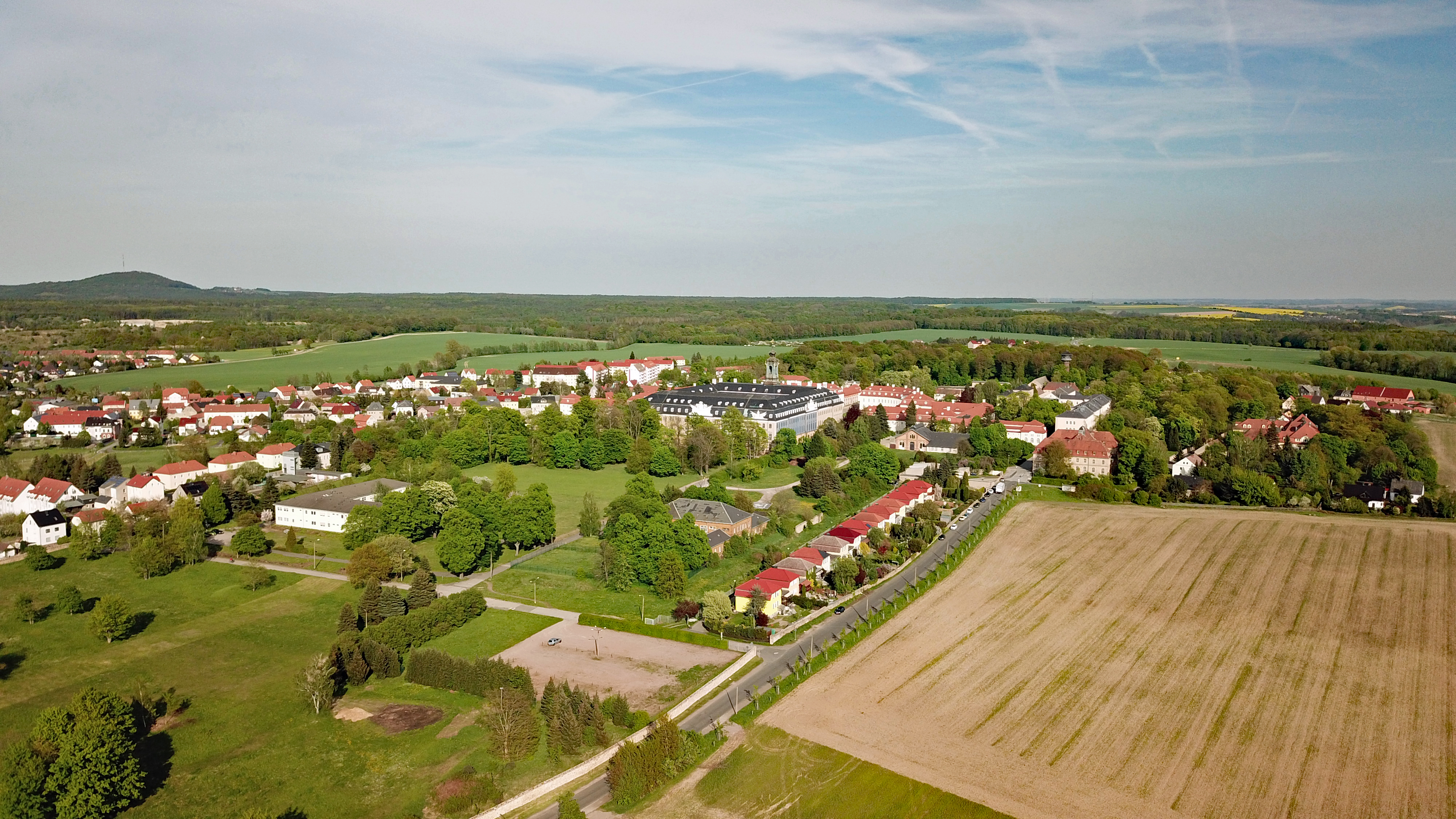
- Aerial view

- Coat of arms

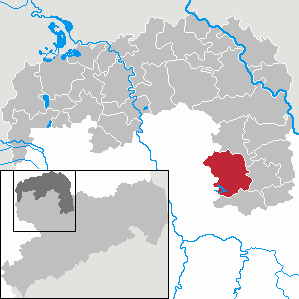
- Location of Wermsdorf within Nordsachsen district
- Interactive map of Wermsdorf
- Location within Germany Location within Saxony
- Coordinates: 51°17′N 12°57′E
- Country: Germany
- State: Saxony
- District: Nordsachsen

Government
  - Mayor (2022–29): Matthias Müller

Area
  - Total: 104.41 km^{2} (40.31 sq mi)
- Elevation: 185 m (607 ft)

Population (2025-12-31)
  - Total: 5,074
  - Density: 48.60/km^{2} (125.9/sq mi)
- Time zone: UTC+01:00 (CET)
  - Summer (DST): UTC+02:00 (CEST)
- Postal codes: 04779
- Dialling codes: 034364
- Vehicle registration: TDO, DZ, EB, OZ, TG, TO
- Website: www.wermsdorf.de

Wermsdorf is a municipality in the Nordsachsen district in Saxony, Germany. Two hunting castles of the Saxon Dukes and Kings are to be found here.

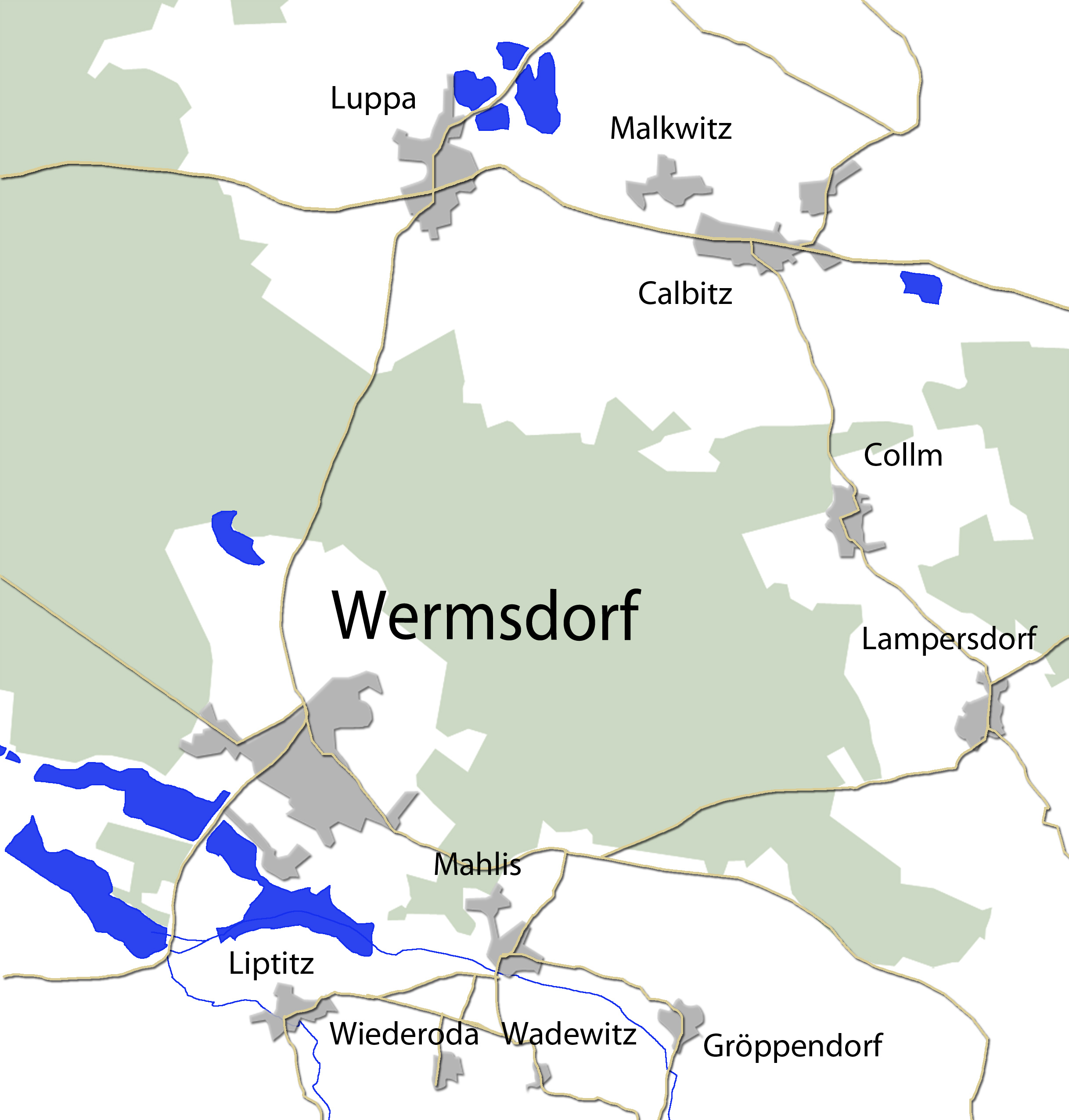
Wermsdorf and its sub-districts 2011

== Geography ==
=== Landscape ===
Wermsdorf is situated within Wermsdorf Forest a wooded area of some 30 km/sq, less than 7.0 km to the north-west of Mügeln. The south side of Wermsdorf is deforested and looks out over a fairly flat landscape (being at the southerly end of the North German Plain) of agricultural land set out in crops. There are a number of man-made lakes suitable for recreation in the vicinity. A quarry lies to the north-east of Wermsdorf.

== Sights ==
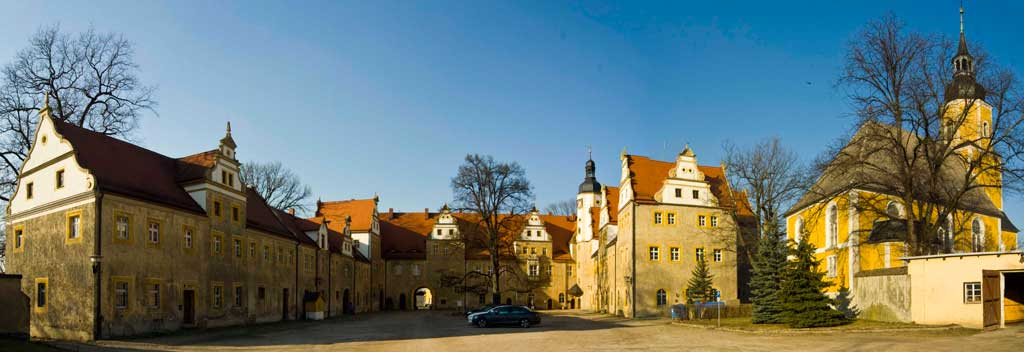
Hubertusburg

There are several historical buildings, some of which have been refurbished in the last few years. The most prominent is Hubertusburg, which, in spite of its more modest size, and bereft of the grand sweep of terraces-cum-steps of Sanssouci in Potsdam, does have a recognizably similar layout to Sanssouci, with the main building overlooking formal gardens, graveled walkways, outbuildings and a wooded area.

== History ==
Nothing is known about the 638 ha large Waldhufendorf settlement as seat of Henricus de Weenboldisdorf mentioned in a document dating from 1206. The first documented mention of Wermsdorf was in 1215. Additional early mentions include:

- 1241 as Burchardus de Werenboldestorp
- 1282 as Wermoldesdorf
- 1403 as Wermelsdorf
- 1440 as Wermesdorff

In 1350 the place was recognised as an oppidum for the first time.

In 1721 construction began on a large Jagdschloss (hunting lodge), the Hubertusburg. Elector Friedrich August II of Saxony extended the palace in 1743 and it became one of the largest baroque hunting lodges in Europe. The Saxonian post station was founded in Wermsdorf in 1722. In 1756 the Seven Years' War broke out and in 1761 the Hubertusburg was plundered by the Prussians and has never recovered since. In 1763 the Hubertusburg Peace Treaty was signed, so-called even though it may have been signed in nearby Schloss Dahlen.

The Hubertusburg was used as an academy for Luftwaffe officers from 1941.

On 25 April 1945 the U.S. Army arrived in Wermsdorf. On 5 May 1945 the Soviet army took over.

== Monuments ==
=== King Albert Monument ===
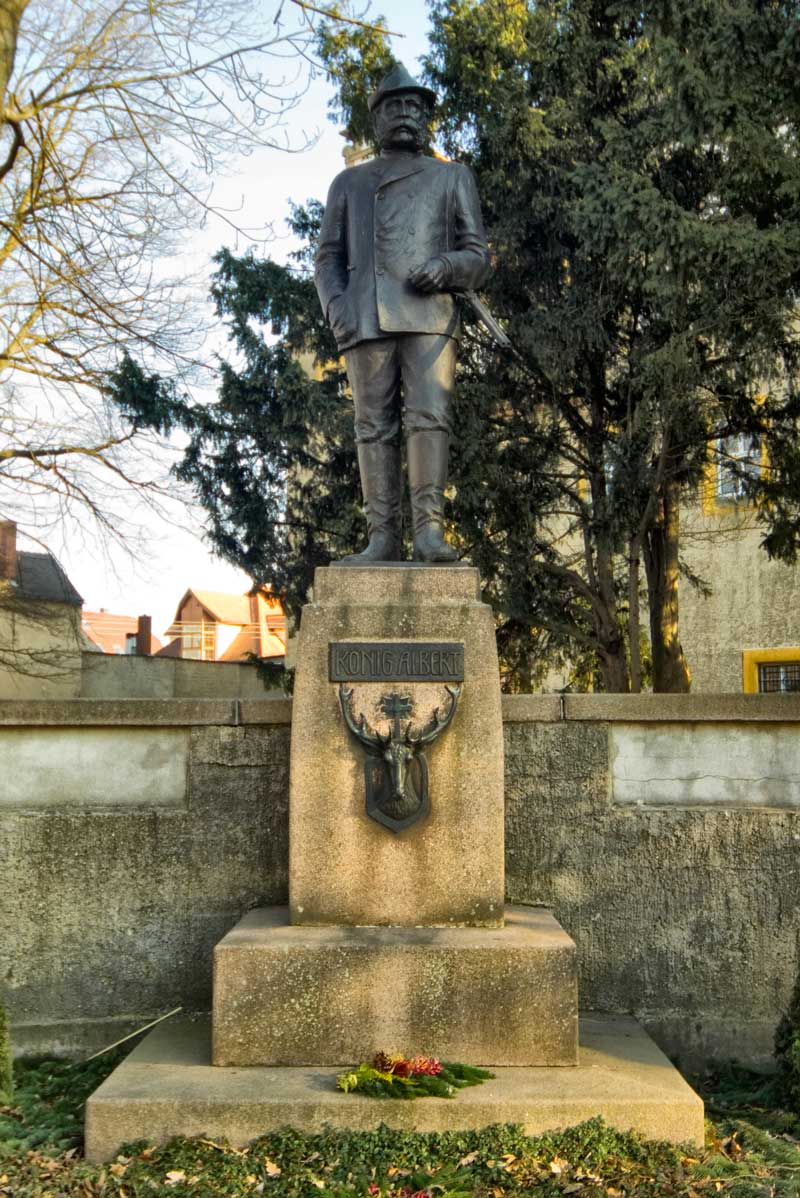
Wermsdorf – King Albert Monument in 2011

In May 1907 the Saxon Military Fraternity of Wermsdorf proposed building a monument for the late Albert of Saxony. To this end, Emperor Wilhelm II gifted the fraternity a bronze cannon barrel. The sculptor was Georg Bernkopf. One year later, the statue of Albert as a huntsman in a hunting cap and with a double barrel shotgun was unveiled in the presence of Frederick Augustus III of Saxony .

=== Death March Memorial ===
At the Old Hunting Lodge, there is a monument stone to commemorate ten unknown concentration camp prisoners who died in the vicinity on a death march in Spring 1945 from Stalag VIIIC in Zagan/Poland, and were buried in the Anstaltsfriedhof.

=== Zeppelin Stone ===
Monument to commemorate the landing of a Zeppelin airship in Wermsdorf on 12 July 1914.

== Recreational activities ==
There are numerous cycling routes of low elevation and trail-ways suitable for walking scattered throughout the nearby Wermsdorf Woods. The nearby lakes are available for bathing, boating and fresh water fishing. Wermsdorf also has a number of hostelries for the enjoyment of traditional German food and drink.
