= Liebschützberg =

- Municipality
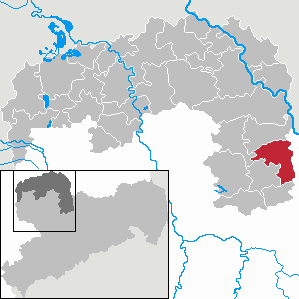
- Location of Liebschützberg within Nordsachsen district
- Interactive map of Liebschützberg
- Location within Germany Location within Saxony
- Coordinates: 51°20′0″N 13°9′32″E
- Country: Germany
- State: Saxony
- District: Nordsachsen
- Subdivisions: 17

Government
  - Mayor (2022–29): Sebastian Sommer (Independent)

Area
  - Total: 68.42 km^{2} (26.42 sq mi)
- Elevation: 140 m (460 ft)

Population (2025-12-31)
  - Total: 2,807
  - Density: 41.03/km^{2} (106.3/sq mi)
- Time zone: UTC+01:00 (CET)
  - Summer (DST): UTC+02:00 (CEST)
- Postal codes: 04758
- Dialling codes: 03435
- Vehicle registration: TDO, DZ, EB, OZ, TG, TO
- Website: www.liebschuetzberg.de

Liebschützberg is a municipality in the district Nordsachsen, in Saxony, Germany.

Until 1991 the territory of Liebschützberg and its 1,600 residents were part of the town of Borna. During the administrative reform of Saxony which followed the reunification of Germany Liebschützberg became an independent self-governing community (gemeinde), effective December 31, 1990.

== Twin towns ==
Liebschützberg is twinned with:

- Gailingen, Germany
