= Gröditz =

- Town
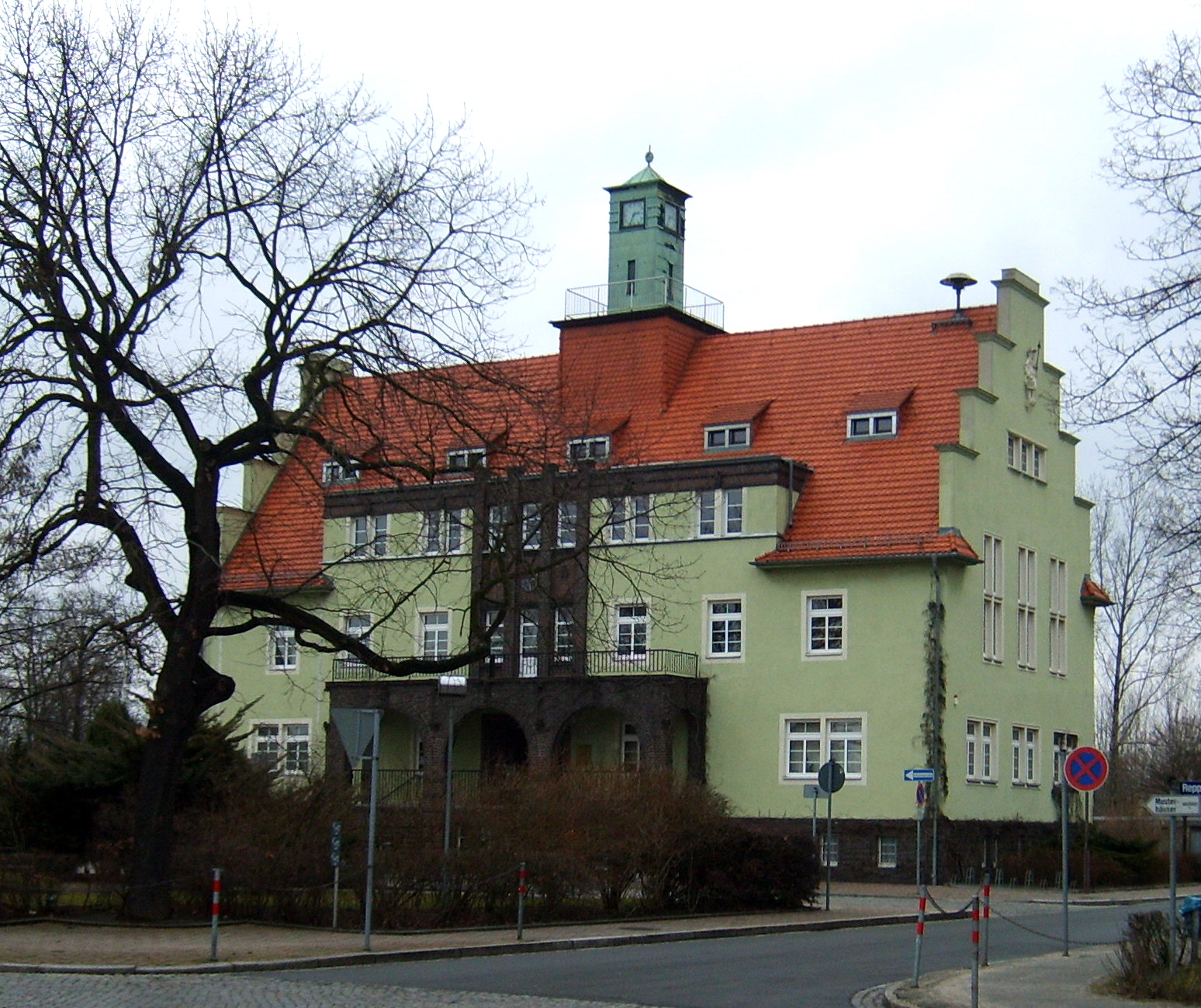
- Town hall

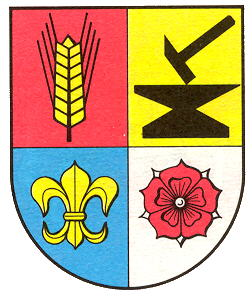
- Coat of arms

- Location of Gröditz within Meißen district
- Interactive map of Gröditz
- Location within Germany Location within Saxony
- Coordinates: 51°25′N 13°28′E
- Country: Germany
- State: Saxony
- District: Meißen

Government
  - Mayor (2022–29): Enrico Münch (CDU)

Area
  - Total: 28.94 km^{2} (11.17 sq mi)
- Elevation: 95 m (312 ft)

Population (2025-12-31)
  - Total: 6,587
  - Density: 227.6/km^{2} (589.5/sq mi)
- Time zone: UTC+01:00 (CET)
  - Summer (DST): UTC+02:00 (CEST)
- Postal codes: 01609
- Dialling codes: 035263
- Vehicle registration: MEI, GRH, RG, RIE
- Website: www.groeditz.de

Gröditz (German pronunciation: [ˈɡʁøːdɪts]) is a town in the district Meißen, in Saxony, Germany. The town is located 12 km northeast of Riesa, and 7 km southwest of Elsterwerda.

== Geography ==
Gröditz is located on a 100 meter high plains that of the Röder is crossed. The city is located on the Saxon side of today's Saxon - Brandenburg border and the former Saxon - Prussian border. By Groeditz leads the Elsterwerda-Grödel raft canal that for the supply of the Dresden-Meissen Elbe Valley with wood from the Schrade forest was created and later to a location-promoting compound of iron-processing plants Riesa, Groeditz and Lauchhammer was (1947 shipping set).

Gröditz includes not only the core city's districts but also Nauwalde, Nieska, Reppis, Spansberg and Schweinfurth.

== History ==
The town was first mentioned in 1363, but was at least since the late 12th century and was inhabited Slavic (the Röderaue has been inhabited since the 1st century). Erected in 1748 Elsterwerda-Grödel raft canal, by a Bomätscher (Treidler, ship puller) powered waterway, formed the basis for the later industrialization. Graf Detlev Carl von Einsiedel bought 1779 Groditzer mill and founded at this location Gröditzer ironworks (Lauchhammer plant), in 1825, the foundation stone for the construction of a blast furnace, which was taken 1827 in operation.

During the World War II, there was a forced labor camp in the Lauchhammer works of the Central German steel plants of the Flick Group, in which 4000 prisoners of war, women and men from the countries occupied by Germany forced labor had to do in the gun production. Moreover, there was from October 1944 to April 1945 an Outdoor stock of Flossenbürg with more than 1000 concentration camp prisoners, including 300 Jews. The extremely inhumane living conditions led to the deaths of many forced laborers.

On 5 October 1967 Groeditz received city rights.

On 25 May 2009 the city was the Federal Government conferred title of "place of diversity".

=== Incorporations ===
On 1 October 1928, in the north of Groeditz neighboring village Reppis was incorporated. On 1 January 2013, the incorporation of the neighboring community Nauwalde, which had since 2000 a member of the Administrative Community Groeditz followed.

=== Population development ===
Development of the population (2013):

Year	Residents
1682	152
1836	150
1848	170
1871	545
1890	954
1900	1.469
1936	3.500
1945	4.303

Year	Residents
1946	5.406
1968	8.100
1987	10.436
1990	10.059
1994	9.265
1998	8.878
2003	8.081
2007	7.534

Year	Residents
2009	7.244
2011	6.970
2013	7.524

=== Religions ===
- Evangelical Lutheran Church
- Roman Catholicism
- Methodist Church
- New Apostolic Church
- Evangelical Free Church congregation
- Apostelamt Jesu Christi

== Famous people ==
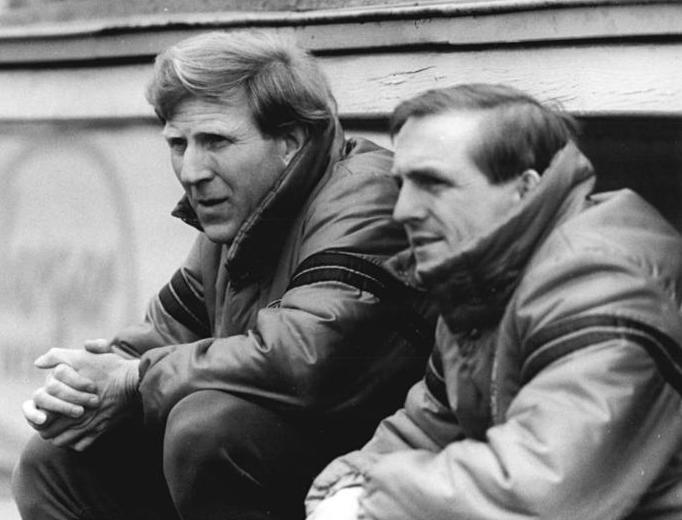
Klaus Sammer (left) and Dieter Riedel (right) in 1986

- Siegfried Richter (1922–2000), entrepreneur, man of charity, honored with the Order of Merit of the Federal Republic of Germany and with the Order of Merit of Saxony
- Klaus Sammer (born 1942), former East Germany national football team player and trainer
- Dieter Riedel (born 1947), former East Germany national football team player and trainer
- Gottfried Sembdner, concert pianist
