= Dieter Riedel =

German football player and coach (born 1947)

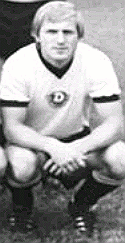
- Riedel in 1976

Personal information
- Full name: Dieter Riedel
- Date of birth: 16 September 1947 (age 79)
- Place of birth: Gröditz, Soviet occupation zone of Germany
- Height: 1.70 m (5 ft 7 in)
- Position: Forward

Senior career*
Years	Team	Apps	(Gls)
1967–1981	Dynamo Dresden	230	(51)

International career
1974–1978	East Germany	4	(0)
Medal record
Men's football
Representing East Germany
Olympic Games
Gold medal – first place	1976 Montreal	Team competition
- * Club domestic league appearances and goals

Dieter Riedel (born 16 September 1947) is a German former football player and coach. From 1995 to 1997, he was the chairman of Dynamo Dresden.

== Club career ==
Riedel, a strong dribbler standing only 1.70 m tall, began his career with BSG Stahl Gröditz. He joined Dynamo Dresden in 1966, forming a legendary duo with Gert Heidler.

Between 1967 and 1981, Riedel played 211 DDR-Oberliga matches and scored 49 goals. In this time, the club won the GDR championship 5 times and the FDGB Cup twice. In his 54 matches for the FDGB Cup, Riedel scored 14 goals.

On 20 September 1967, Riedel scored his team's first goal in the Europacup, from a distance of 20 meters against the Glasgow Rangers in the Inter-Cities Fairs Cup. In the European Cup competitions, he played in a total of 46 matches and scored eight goals.

== International career ==
Up to 1978, Riedel played in four international matches for East Germany national football team. He was also part of the team which won the gold medal at the 1976 Summer Olympics in Montreal. In 1983, as an assistant of Klaus Sammer, he took over Dynamo Dresden training. On 26 August 1995, after the arrest of Rolf Jürgen Otto, Riedel became president of the association. He remained in this office until 2 September 1997.

== Personal life ==
Riedel, who is by occupation toolmaker and teacher, has a wife and two children. He is at present a coach of BSC Freiberg and works in a middle school in Dresden as a sports teacher.
