= Holzhof =

Sports facility in Brandenburg

Coordinates: 51°26′46.2″N 13°31′1″E

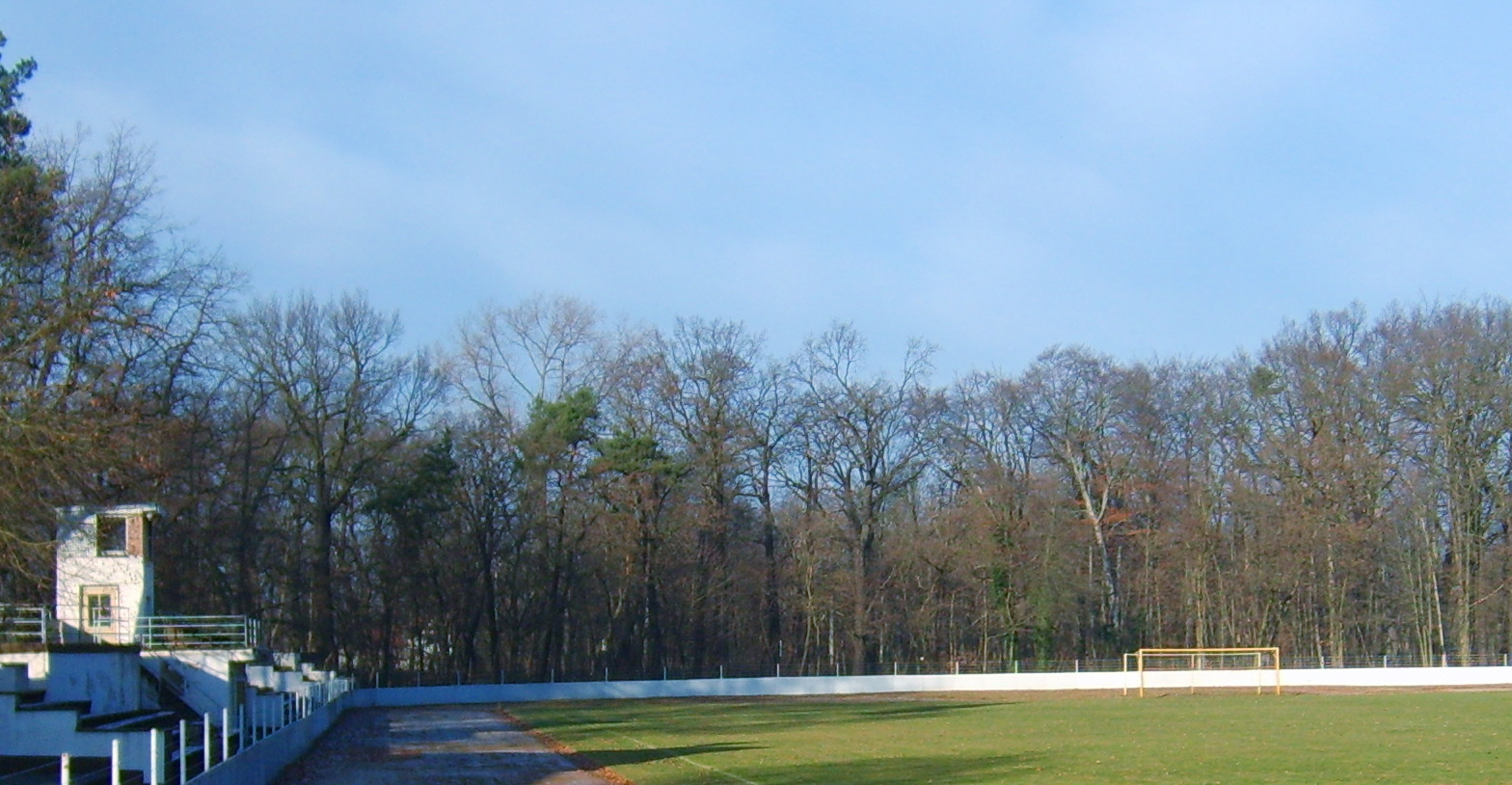
The sports field at the Holzhof in Elsterwerda

The Holzhof is a traditional sports facility in the small Brandenburg town of Elsterwerda in the Elbe-Elster district. This facility is located on the town's outskirts, toward the direction of Großenhain.

== History ==
The Holzhof site has a rich history that dates to its origins as a transshipment point on the Elsterwerda-Grödel raft canal, which became operational in 1748. Initially, it served as a hub for the transfer of timber and other goods arriving via waterways or carts. During this period, the site likely featured only basic structures, such as shelters for carters, storage for goods, and facilities for horses and fodder. However, with the decline of timber transport on the canal in 1833 and the construction of the Elsterwerda-Riesa railway line in 1875, the significance of the timber yard diminished.

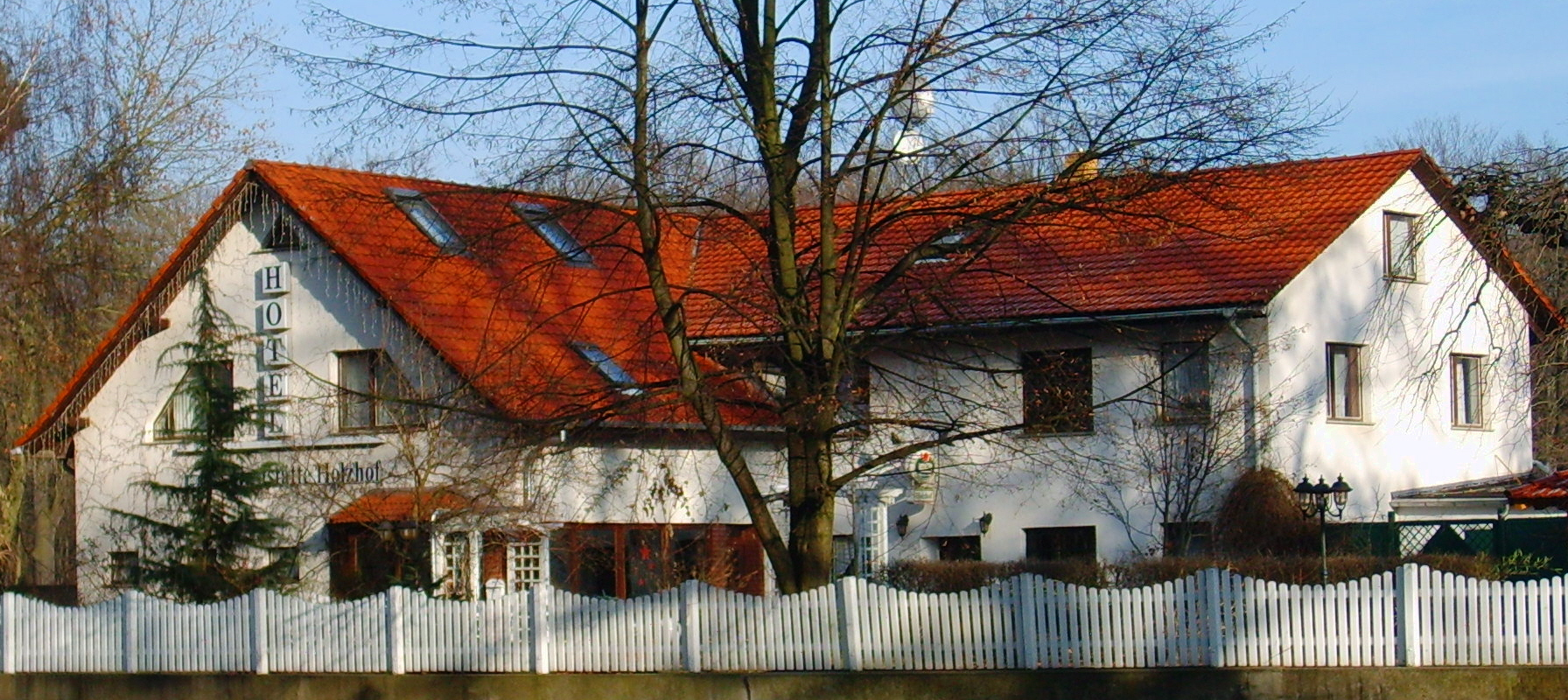
The Holzhof restaurant in Elsterwerda

As early as 1864, a building previously used by the Royal Forestry Administration was repurposed as a restaurant, making the Holzhof a popular destination for outings and excursions. The connection with the Krauschützer Park across the Pulsnitz River, established in 1882 and linked by the Gründler Bridge opened in 1883, further enhanced its appeal. In 1885, the town purchased the site and its building for 27,000 Reichsmark, leasing it to various clubs for their events. In the early 1920s, the city's first public outdoor swimming pool was opened near the Pulsnitz. In 1934, a new open-air swimming pool was inaugurated on the Holzhof, initially sourcing its water from the Pulsnitz. Subsequent developments focused on creating sports facilities, including sports fields, tennis courts, a parade ground, a fairground, and a shooting range. These plans were designed by the district's master meadow builder, Balsam, and the facilities were completed in 1937. Before this, sports facilities had existed in Ludwig-Jahn-Straße since the turn of the century, and in the 1920s at the Schlosspark.

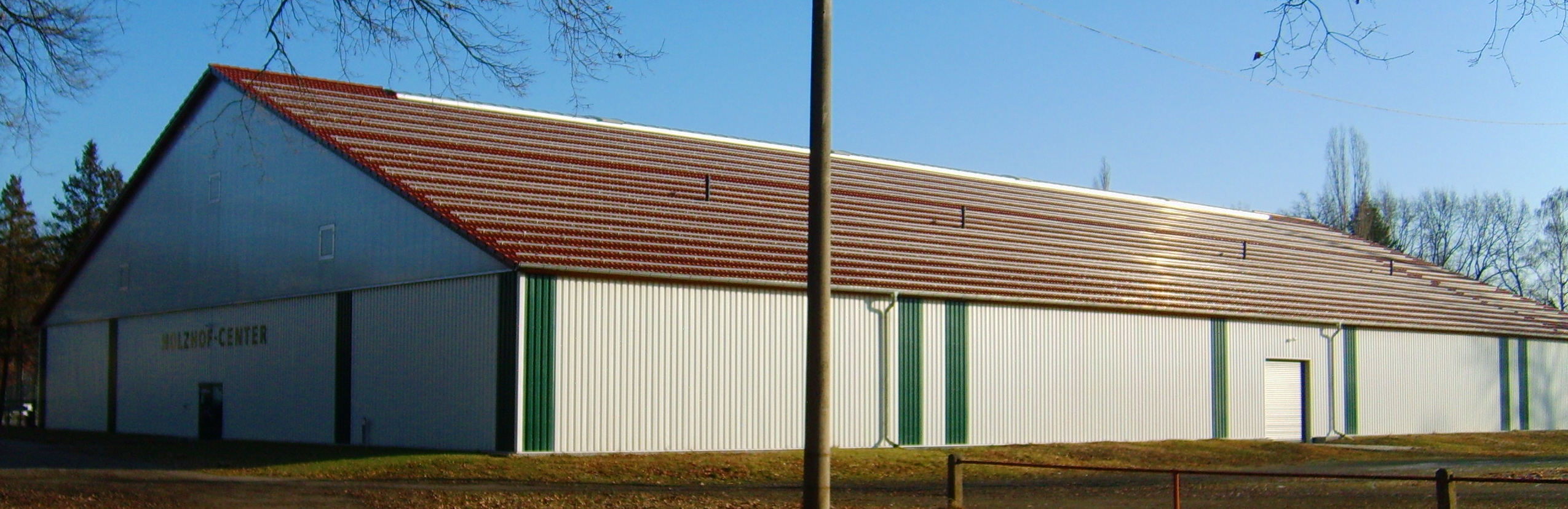
Tennis center at the Holzhof in Elsterwerda

However, the Holzhof restaurant fell victim to arson in April 1945 during World War II. After the war, the damaged facilities were gradually restored, and in 1962, the swimming pool was concreted over. In 1970, the extraction of water from the Pulsnitz was prohibited due to hygiene concerns, and groundwater with a high iron content had to be used. Extensive renovations and extensions led to the reopening of a restaurant that met modern requirements in 1977. The property was sold in 1989 and underwent further conversions and expansions, becoming the Holzhof Hotel and Park Restaurant. In 1997, the swimming pool faced such severe deficiencies that it had to cease operations.

In December 2003, an indoor tennis hall was inaugurated on the site, followed a little later by seven tennis courts.
