= Nauwalde =

- Ortsteil of Gröditz
- Nauwalde Kirche
- Interactive map of Nauwalde
- Location within Germany Location within Saxony
- Coordinates: 51°25′N 13°25′E
- Country: Germany
- State: Saxony
- District: Meißen
- Town: Gröditz

Area
  - Total: 20.35 km^{2} (7.86 sq mi)
- Elevation: 92 m (302 ft)

Population (2011-12-31)
  - Total: 1,025
  - Density: 50.37/km^{2} (130.5/sq mi)
- Time zone: UTC+01:00 (CET)
  - Summer (DST): UTC+02:00 (CEST)
- Postal codes: 01609
- Dialling codes: 035263
- Vehicle registration: MEI, GRH, RG, RIE

Nauwalde is a village and former municipality in the district of Meißen, in Saxony, Germany. Since 1 January 2013, it is part of the town of Gröditz.

The first recorded mention of Nauwalde was in 1284. The village of Schweinfurth was merged to the municipality of Nauwalde in 1974, followed by the villages of Nieska and Spansberg in 1994. In 2013, the municipality was merged to the town of Gröditz.
