= Hartmut Buschbacher =

German rowing coach

Personal information
- Born: 23 April 1958 (age 68) Elsterwerda, East Germany
- Occupation: Rowing coach

Sport
- Sport: Rowing
Medal record
Men's rowing
Representing East Germany
World Rowing Junior Championships
Gold medal – first place	1975 Villach	Coxed four
Gold medal – first place	1976 Montreal	Coxless pair

Hartmut Buschbacher (born 23 April 1958) is a German rowing coach. As a rower, he represented East Germany.

== Rowing career ==
Buschbacher was born in 1958 in Elsterwerda. Sources from 1976 vary whether he rowed for ASK Vorwärts Rostock or for SC Dynamo Berlin.

At the 1975 World Rowing Junior Championships he won gold with the junior men's coxed four. Partnered with Heiko Schulz at the 1976 World Rowing Junior Championships he won gold in the junior men's coxless pair. At the 1977 East German national championships, he came second in the coxless pair alongside Schulz. At the 1978 East German national championships, he came second with the men's eight. He went to the 1978 World Rowing Championships on Lake Karapiro in New Zealand as a reserve but did not compete. He participated in the 1979 Soviet Spartakiad. Buschbacher was one of the 66 rowers who travelled to the 1980 Moscow Olympics but only 55 of them competed; he was one of the reserve rowers who did not race.

== Coaching career ==
Buschbacher worked as a rowing coach after his rowing career. From 1985 until 1990, he was the chief coach of the East German women. After the German reunification in 1990, he went to Boston in the United States and trained their national women's team from 1991 until 2000. From 2006 until 2008, he was the chief coach for the Chinese national women's team. At the 2008 Olympics, he agreed to return to Germany to be the chief coach of their national team. He resigned as German coach at the end of 2012 and was succeeded by Marcus Schwarzrock.

In 1988, he was awarded a Banner of Labor (2nd Class) by the East German government for his coaching work at SC Dynamo Berlin. Under Buschbacher's guidance, Kathrin Haacker and Judith Zeidler won gold in the coxless pair at the 1989 World Rowing Championships; it was the first East German win in this boat class since 1983. In the following year, Buschbacher coached the women's coxless four and whilst they were the clear favourite at the 1990 World Rowing Championships, they only won silver.
