= Nünchritz =

- Municipality
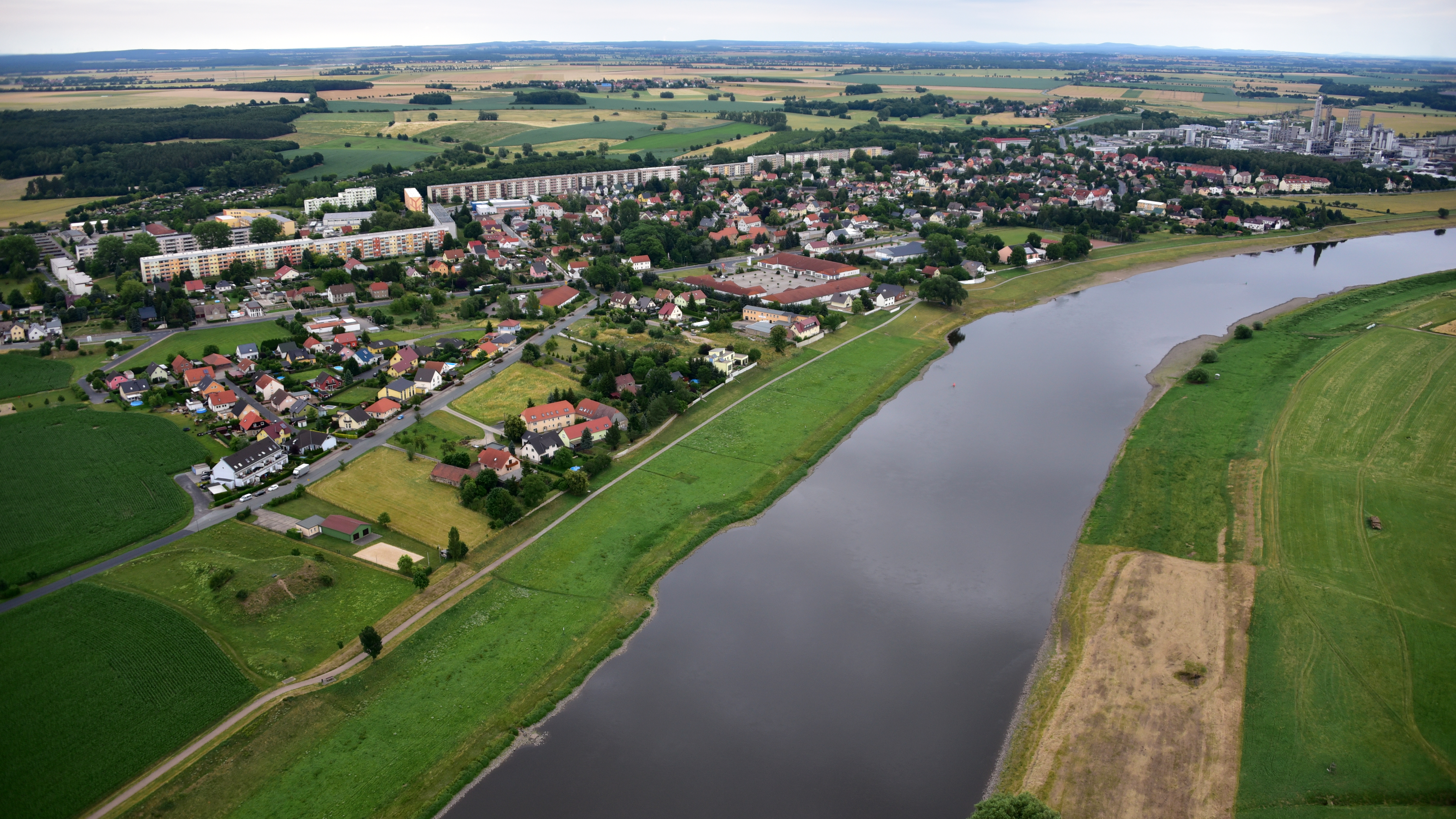
- Aerial view of Nünchritz (2017)

- Coat of arms

- Location of Nünchritz within Meißen district
- Interactive map of Nünchritz
- Location within Germany Location within Saxony
- Coordinates: 51°18′N 13°24′E
- Country: Germany
- State: Saxony
- District: Meißen

Government
  - Mayor (2021–28): Andrea Beger (CDU)

Area
  - Total: 31.11 km^{2} (12.01 sq mi)
- Elevation: 105 m (344 ft)

Population (2025-12-31)
  - Total: 5,285
  - Density: 169.9/km^{2} (440.0/sq mi)
- Time zone: UTC+01:00 (CET)
  - Summer (DST): UTC+02:00 (CEST)
- Postal codes: 01612
- Dialling codes: 035265
- Vehicle registration: MEI, GRH, RG, RIE
- Website: www.nuenchritz.de

Nünchritz is a municipality in the district of Meißen, in Saxony, Germany.

== Municipality subdivisions ==
Nünchritz includes the following subdivisions:

- Diesbar-Seußlitz
- Goltzscha
- Grödel
- Leckwitz
- Merschwitz
- Naundörfchen
- Neuseußlitz
- Roda
- Weißig
- Zschaiten

== See also ==
- Elsterwerda-Grödel raft canal
