= Apostelamt Jesu Christi =

Church in Germany

Apostelamt Jesu Christi (Apostle Ministry of Jesus Christ) is a German Christian church with historical roots in the Catholic Apostolic Church and the New Apostolic Church. It is part of the religious movement called Irvingism.

== History ==
In mid-2006 four Apostles (Jorg Stohwasser, Ingolf Schultz, Uwe Jacob and Hans-Georg Richter) and their followers left Apostelamt Jesu Christi to become part of the Old Apostolic Church.
