= Elsterwerda–Grödel raft canal =

Waterway in Elsterwerda

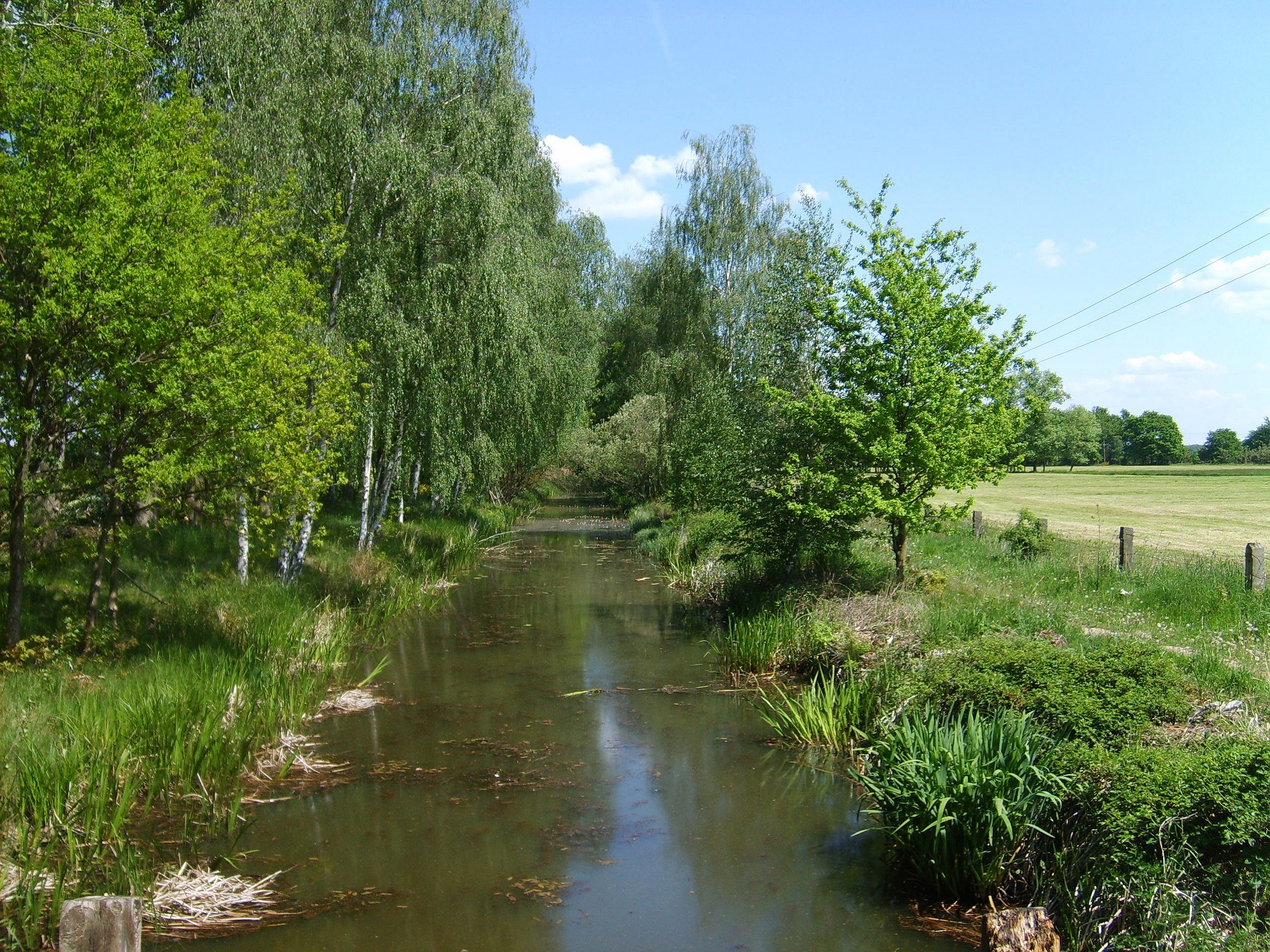
- The raft canal between Elsterwerda and Prösen
- Interactive map of Elsterwerda–Grödel raft canal
- Location: Germany: Brandenburg, Saxony

Specifications
- Length: 21.4 km (13.3 miles)

History
- Construction began: 1742
- Date completed: 1748

Geography
- Start point: On the Elbe near Grödel; 51°18′27″N 13°21′26″E
- End point: At the Pulsnitz in Elsterwerda; 51°26′56″N 13°30′58″E

The Elsterwerda–Grödel raft canal (German: Elsterwerda-Grödel-Floßkanal), established in the 18th century, serves as a waterway connecting the Pulsnitz River in Elsterwerda with the Elbe River near Grödel in Germany.

The original purpose of the canal, which in the present day is used primarily for recreational purposes, was to meet the high demand for wood in the Dresden/Meissen area from the forests in the vicinity of Elsterwerda (now Brandenburg), which at that time still belonged to Saxony. Its construction was ordered personally by the Saxon Elector. Later, it served primarily as a transport route for the Gröditzer ironworks until navigation ceased in 1942. Barges pulled by laborers (known in the region as Bomätschern) were used for transport. From the 1960s until the fall of the Berlin Wall, it was used as an irrigation canal.

== Geographical location, natural area, flora and fauna ==
The Elsterwerda–Grödel raft canal is in the eastern Elbe-Elster region. Beginning at an artificially constructed basin adjacent to the Elbe River in Grödel, Saxony, the canal runs in a northeasterly direction through the western Großenhainer Pflege region. Continuing this path, it then proceeds to the Schraden area before reaching its final point at Holzhof in Elsterwerda, Brandenburg.

Between Pulsen and Gröditz the canal intersects with the three estuary arms of the Große Röder, from which it is fed. In the vicinity of the town of Gröditz, the canal has since been filled in over a length of about one kilometer, which is now divided into two distinct sections. While the southern section of Gröditz flows into the Große Röder through a pipeline, providing it with a water supply. Simultaneously, the northern section is supplied with water from the Große Röder via another pipeline. Additionally, Elsterwerda has a connection to the Pulsnitz shortly before it converges with the Schwarze Elster River further downstream.

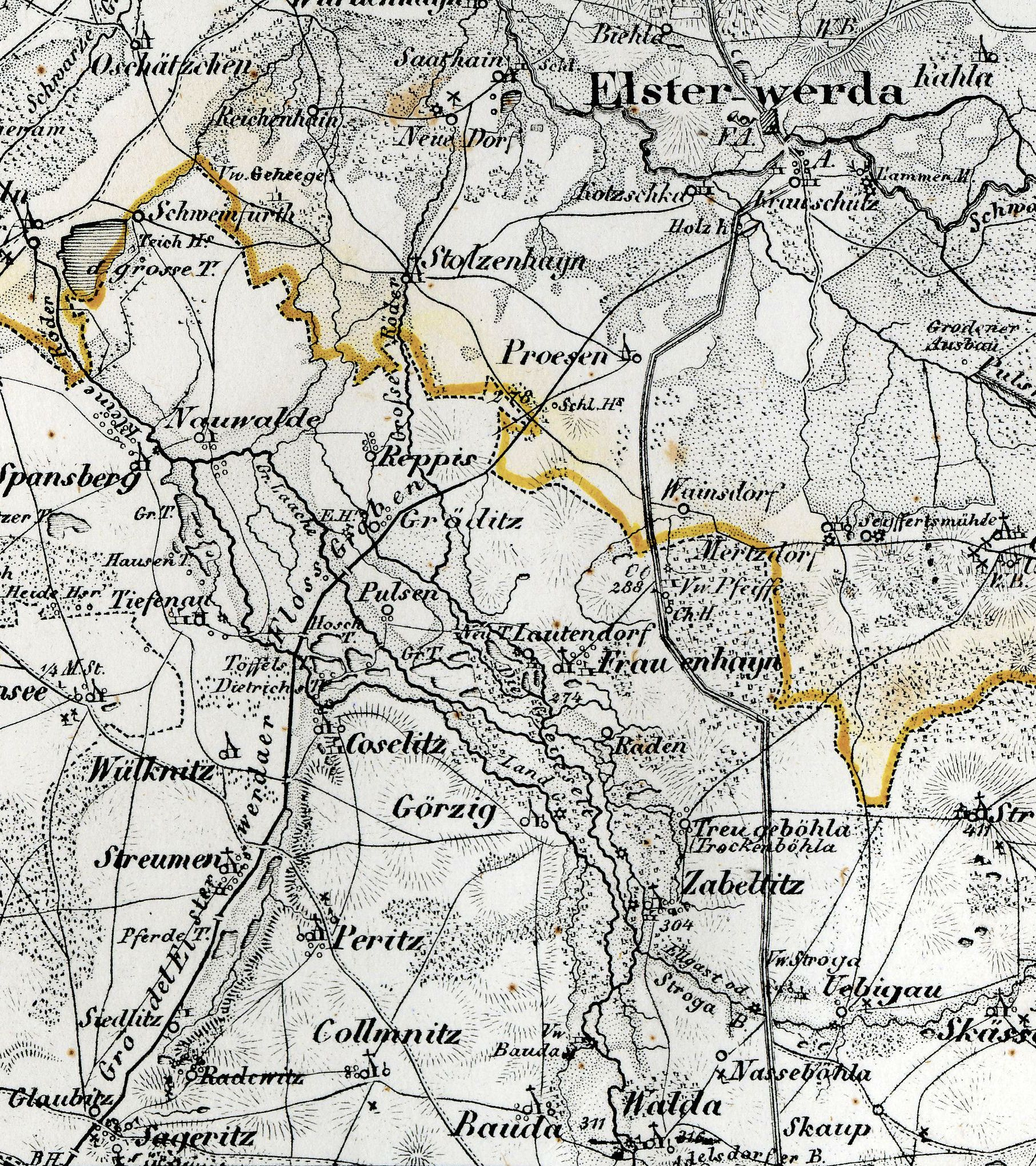
The historical course of the canal with its sluices

It has an average width ranging from approximately 7 to 9 meters. The canal spans a total of 21.4 kilometers, with approximately 15.45 kilometers of this length situated within Saxon territory. Along the entire stretch, six widened passing places were built to facilitate meetings between barges. In its course, it passes by the villages of Glaubitz, Radewitz, Marksiedlitz, Streumen, Wülknitz, Koselitz, Tiefenau, Pulsen, Gröditz, Prösen and ultimately reaches Elsterwerda. Among other things, it passes under the Riesa-Dresden railroad line and the main road 98 in Glaubitz, the main road 169 in Prösen, and the Berlin-Dresden railroad line in Elsterwerda.

Within Elsterwerda, a portion of the raft canal intersects with the 484-square-kilometer Niederlausitzer Heidelandschaft Nature Park, the centerpiece of which, the Forsthaus Prösa nature reserve, hosts one of the largest contiguous sessile oak forests in Central Europe. The canal itself has a diverse fish population and plays a crucial role in supporting the endangered Elbe beaver, a rare subspecies of the European beaver. Additionally, it serves as a habitat and breeding ground for various species of water birds.

The aquatic flora within the canal encompasses a variety of floating and submerged plants, including hornwort, water milfoil, duckweed, pond lilies, and pond weeds. Along the riparian zones, observations have identified bush carnation, alpine butterwort, marsh gentian, and the abundant presence of reeds in certain areas.

== Name ==
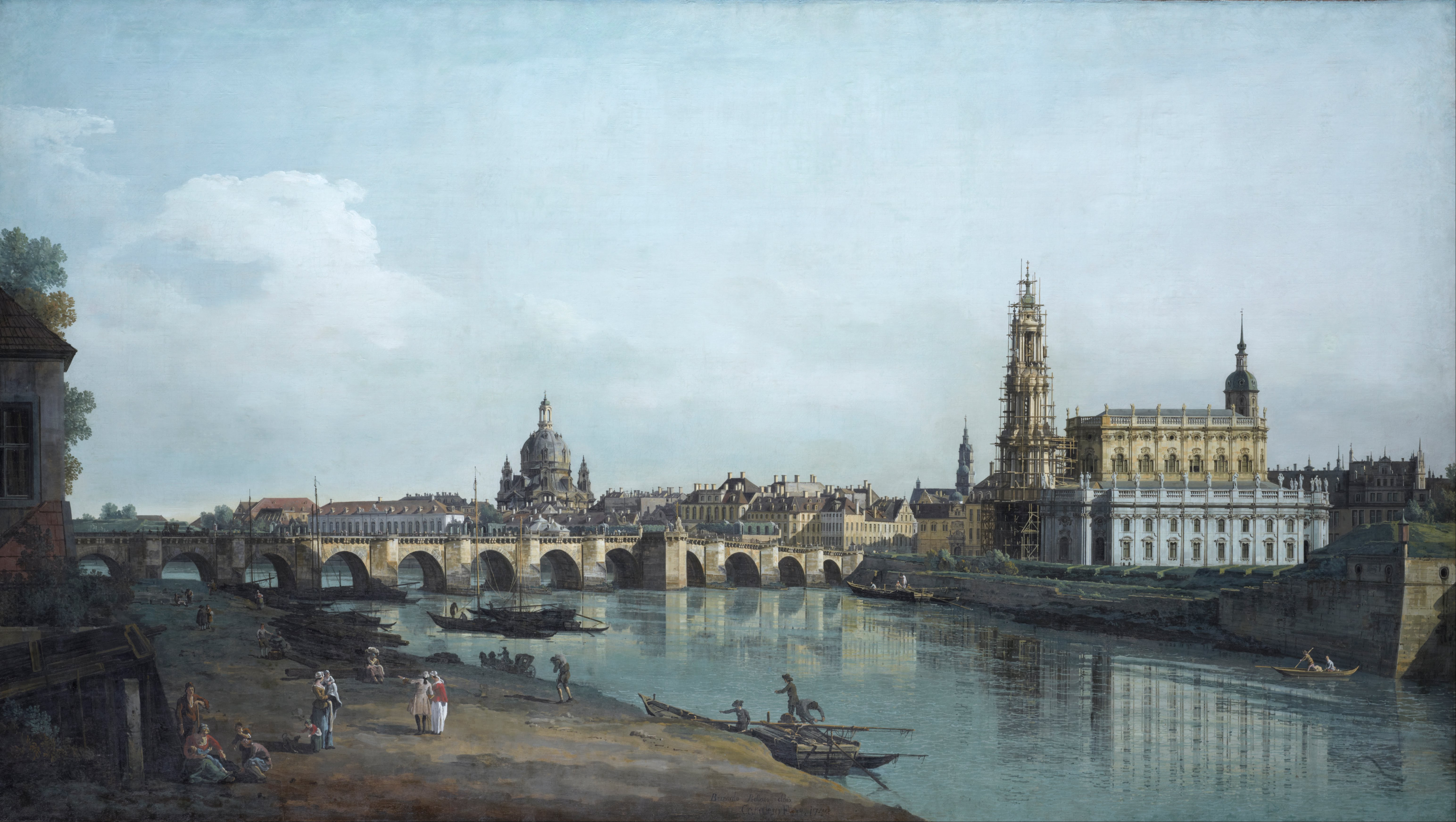
Dresden around 1748

The watercourse known by the local communities as simply "the canal" has had a variety of names in the past and continues to do so today. Historical maps, writings, and documents have documented several different names for this structure, alongside the name Elsterwerda-Grödel-Floßkanal.

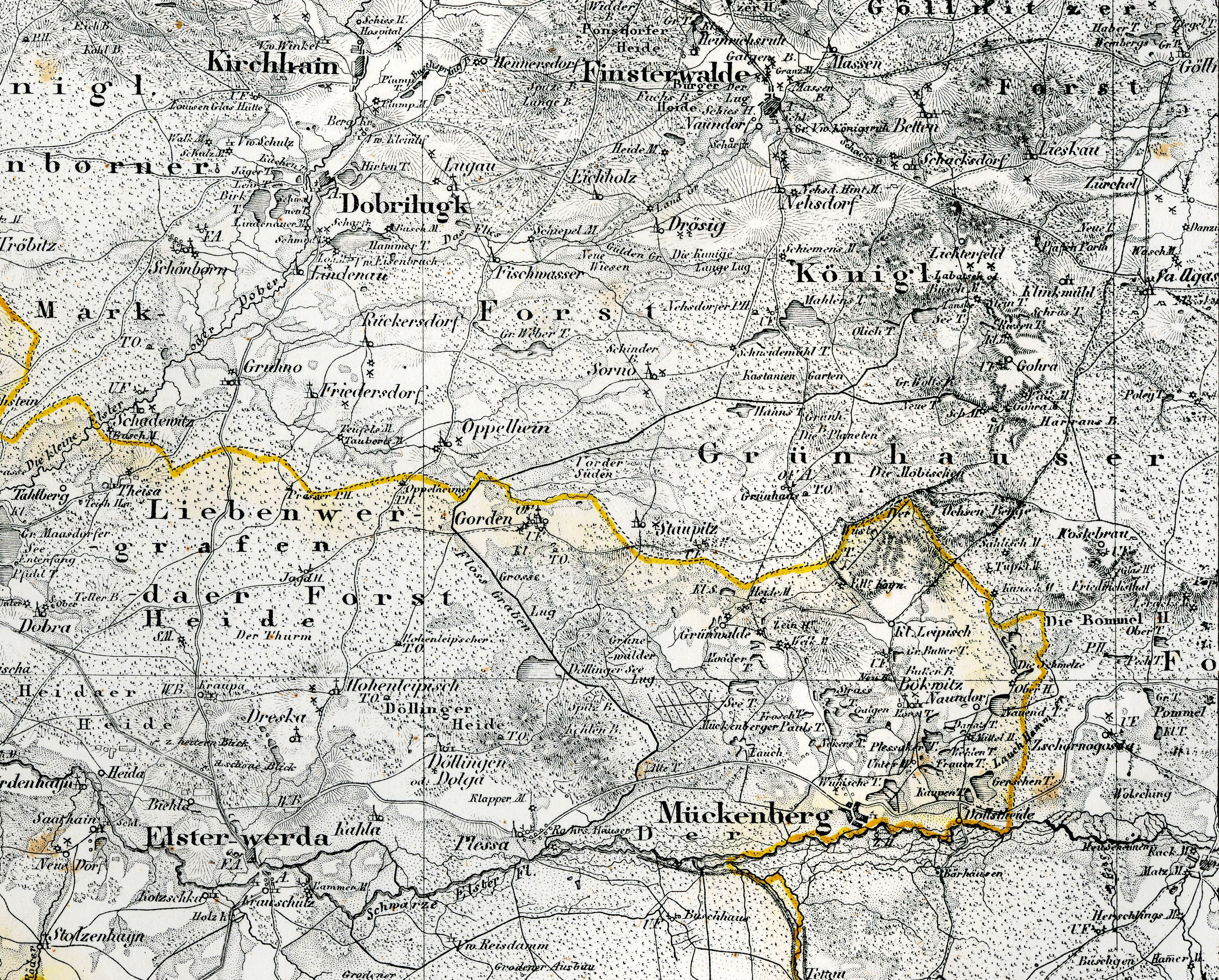
The forests around Elsterwerda on a map from the 19th century

While the jubilee volume of the local history societies Elsterwerda and Gröditz published in 1997 was named "250 years of the raft canal Grödel-Elsterwerda", the water body was again named Floßkanal Elsterwerda - Grödel in 1912 in the Neues Archiv für sächsische Geschichte und Altertumskunde (New Archive for Saxon History and Antiquity), a professional journal for Saxon regional history. In the map of the German Empire published in 1907 by Perthes in Gotha and in the Vienna Peace Treaty of 1815 (Article 17) the canal is called Elsterwerdaer-Floßgraben. Alfred Hettner's Geographische Zeitschrift from 1898 calls it Grödel-Elsterwerdaer Floßkanal. Under this name, it is also described in volume 63, "Der Schraden", of the publication series Werte der deutschen Heimat published in 2001. The Riesa River Master's Office still calls the canal by this name in the present day. Meyers Konversations-Lexikon from 1885 and Petermanns Geographische Mitteilungen published in 1902 described it as Grödel-Elsterwerdaer Kanal.

Other common variants included and still include Floßkanal Grödel-Elsterwerda, Elsterwerda-Grödeler Floßkanal, Elbe-Elster-Floßkanal, Elster-Elbe-Canal, Elbe-Elster-Kanal, and Floßkanal.

== Historical development and use of the raft canal ==
=== A residential city needs wood ===
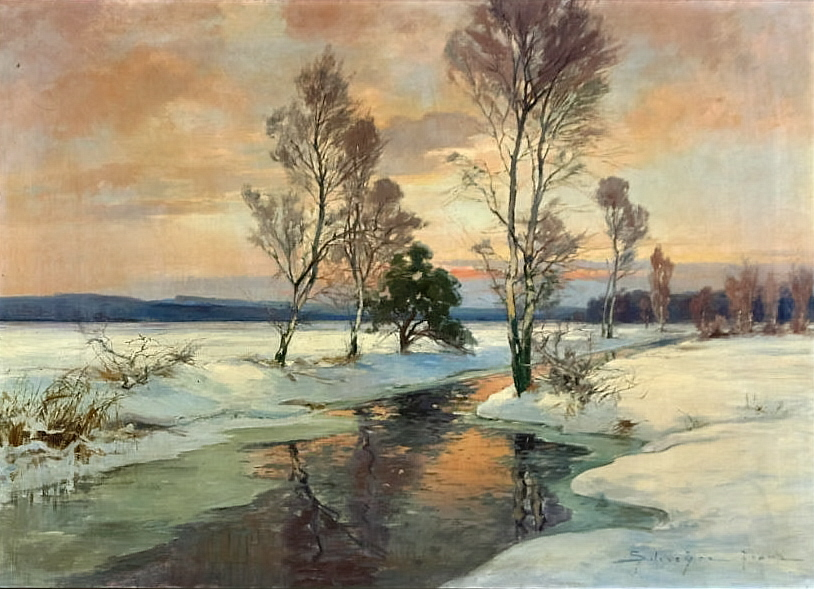
The main raft ditch in a painting by Franz Schreyer (1858–1938)

Under the rule of Saxon Elector Friedrich August I, also known as Augustus the Strong, there was a significant surge in construction activity in the Dresden/Meissen area. August had his residential city on the Elbe River expanded into one of the most magnificent in Europe. This expansion included not only the development of the Dresden Neustadt but also the construction of numerous other buildings, including the establishment of the famous porcelain manufactory in Meissen. Moreover, Dresden experienced substantial population growth during this period. Between 1648 and 1699, the population increased by a third, growing from 16,000 to 21,298 residents. By 1755, this population would triple to reach 63,209 inhabitants. The rising demand for wood in this growing city led to a search for new sources of timber. Since the Ore Mountains were already extensively exploited, and Bohemian timber was costly, attention turned to the vast forested areas in the northern part of the Electorate. These included the Grünhauser Forst, situated south of Finsterwalde, the Liebenwerdaer Heide, the Plessaer Heide, and the Schradenwald. Although these forests were largely state-owned, they had previously been primarily used for hunting and were thus relatively untouched at that time.

The area was characterized by the presence of two significant bodies of water, the Black Elster and the Pulsnitz. While the lower course of the Pulsnitz had undergone substantial straightening efforts for drainage purposes since the 16th century through the construction of the new Pulsnitzgraben, the Schwarze Elster flowed through the lowlands in numerous small, winding tributaries. Therefore, a regulated rafting operation was only possible here below the town of Liebenwerda, which in turn made it necessary to first raft the wood to the mouth of the Elster at Jessen with an altogether high effort and then to transport it back upstream the Elbe.

The most suitable way to bring the coveted raw material to the royal city by the shortest route seemed to be a connection between the Black Elster and the Elbe, which was yet to be built. The first plans for the project to connect the two rivers were undertaken on the personal orders of the Elector as early as 1702. However, the preliminary planning and investigations were to take several more decades.

After the first construction tests of a raft ditch, the so-called main raft ditch with a length of 26 kilometers was realized sometime later. The main raft ditch was fed by three tributaries. They started in the forests south of Finsterwalde, at the now devastated village of Gohra, south of Lichterfeld, and the Mahlenzteich near Nehesdorf. The tributaries subsequently converged at Sorno. From here, the main raft ditch ran via Oppelhain, crossing the eastern Liebenwerda and Plessa heaths to the Schwarze Elster near Plessa and on to Elsterwerda. This construction project proved relatively straightforward, as the builders had previously acquired experience in similar endeavors in Saxony. The main raft ditch was completed as early as 1743 and became operational the following year.

The project faced increased complexity in the section connecting the Black Elster and Elbe rivers. Here, the water level at the planned outlet into the Elbe was higher than in Elsterwerda. In standard raft ditches, wood would naturally move or drift in the direction of the water flow. Consequently, a canal needed to be built to overcome the elevation differences using sluices. Engineer Johannes Müller, responsible for preliminary investigations, submitted the initial drafts for this canal in 1727. Due to extensive investigations, calculations, and tests, the commencement of construction was repeatedly postponed to ensure the project's profitability. Additionally, there were contentious debates about the canal's route; an alternative line from Prieschka to Stehla had been considered but faced strong opposition from influential figures who deemed it too costly, among other concerns. The route between Elsterwerda and Grödel also underwent several alterations. Construction of the canal finally commenced after the death of Augustus the Strong in 1733, under the rule of Elector Friedrich August II in 1742.

Müller, who had previously overseen the construction of the main raft ditch, was assigned the responsibility for the canal's construction. The original completion date for the canal was scheduled for 1744. However, the project encountered numerous challenges. Excavation work proved to be highly expensive, securing a reliable workforce was a persistent issue, and difficulties arose in establishing a connection to the Elbe and the Prösen sluice. The presence of unfavorable foundation soil, specifically alluvial sand, posed a significant challenge, leading to multiple renovations of the Prösen sluice. It was not until 1767 that this sluice functioned satisfactorily. As a result, the direct connection to the Elbe was ultimately abandoned.

After six years of construction and after it had been flooded shortly before, the first two barges pulled by bombers finally passed the completed canal in a test run on 2 December 1748. It took place in the presence of a state canal commission and the meanwhile appointed raft master Schubert and lasted, with an interruption in Prösen, for twelve hours. The cost of the project totaled 65,437 thalers, noticeably more than the 52,610 thalers originally approved for construction. Added to this were 5800 thalers for the raft ditch.

=== Division of the channel ===
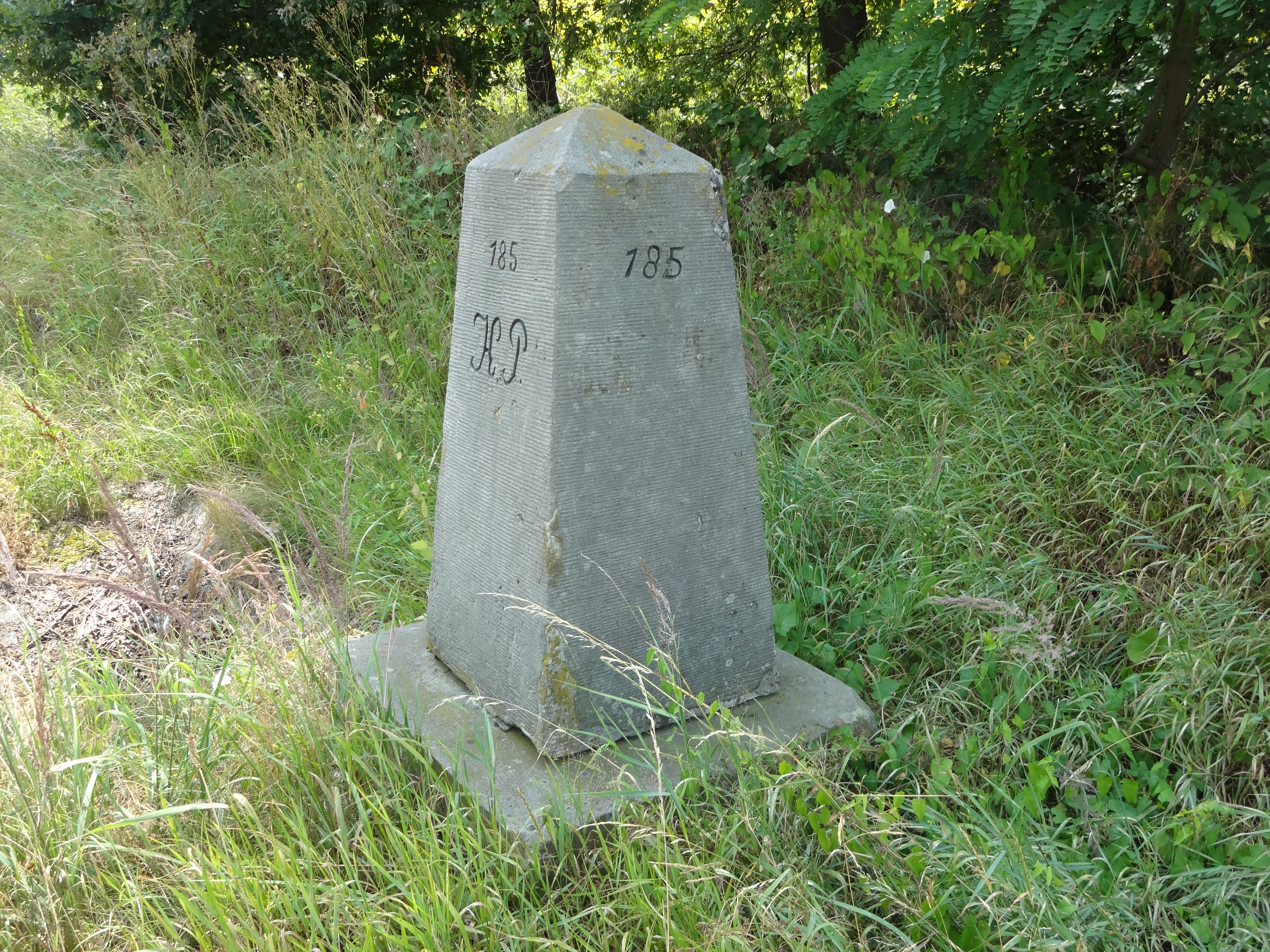
Saxon-Prussian border stone located on the canal

Problems at the Prösen sluice led to several interruptions in the canal's operation. Nevertheless, the construction of the canal did lead to improvements in the supply of timber within its sales area, as the availability and cost of Bohemian timber also became more favorable.

Two decades after its opening, the canal took on a significantly different role. In 1725, Baroness Benedicta Margaretha von Löwendal played a pivotal role in establishing an ironworks known as Lauchhammerwerk in the Mückenberg domain. She thus laid the foundation stone for one of the first industrial enterprises in the region, which was to have a considerable influence on the region in the years to come. The noblewoman, who died in 1776 without any direct descendants, bequeathed her property to her godson Detlev Carl von Einsiedel, who owned the Saathain estate about 20 kilometers to the west. Recognizing the economic potential of the raft canal, he established another hammer mill in 1779 in the village of Gröditz, situated along the Röder River, which was part of the Saathain estate. The factory relied on the abundant water supply from the Große Röder, which flowed through Gröditz, and it obtained permission to use the canal for the transportation of goods.

At the beginning of the 19th century, the Napoleonic Wars had a significant impact on Europe. The Kingdom of Saxony, which had aligned itself with Napoleon, ended up on the losing side. Following the Congress of Vienna in 1815, Saxony was divided, and it had to relinquish substantial portions of its territory. The new border traversed the region along the road from Mühlberg to Ortrand. Communities along this road were annexed to Prussia. To the north of Gröditz, the border intersected the course of the raft canal, splitting it into a Prussian section in the north and a slightly larger Saxon section in the south. This division also separated the ironworks in Gröditz from its parent facility in Mückenberg by a state border. Additionally, Saxony no longer had access to the forests situated north of the canal. During negotiations on behalf of the state, Detlev von Einsiedel, the state secretary, secured a written agreement for free navigation and rafting on the canal in the Vienna Peace Treaty. However, especially in the smaller Prussian section, the transport route then largely lost its importance for the transport of goods. Furthermore, when Prussian State Highway No. 62 was established, crossing the canal and intended as a postal route from Berlin to Dresden, the canal was filled in at Holzhof in Elsterwerda without much ceremony. Consequently, timber transports on the canal came to a complete halt in 1833.

=== Renewal of the canal and its structures ===
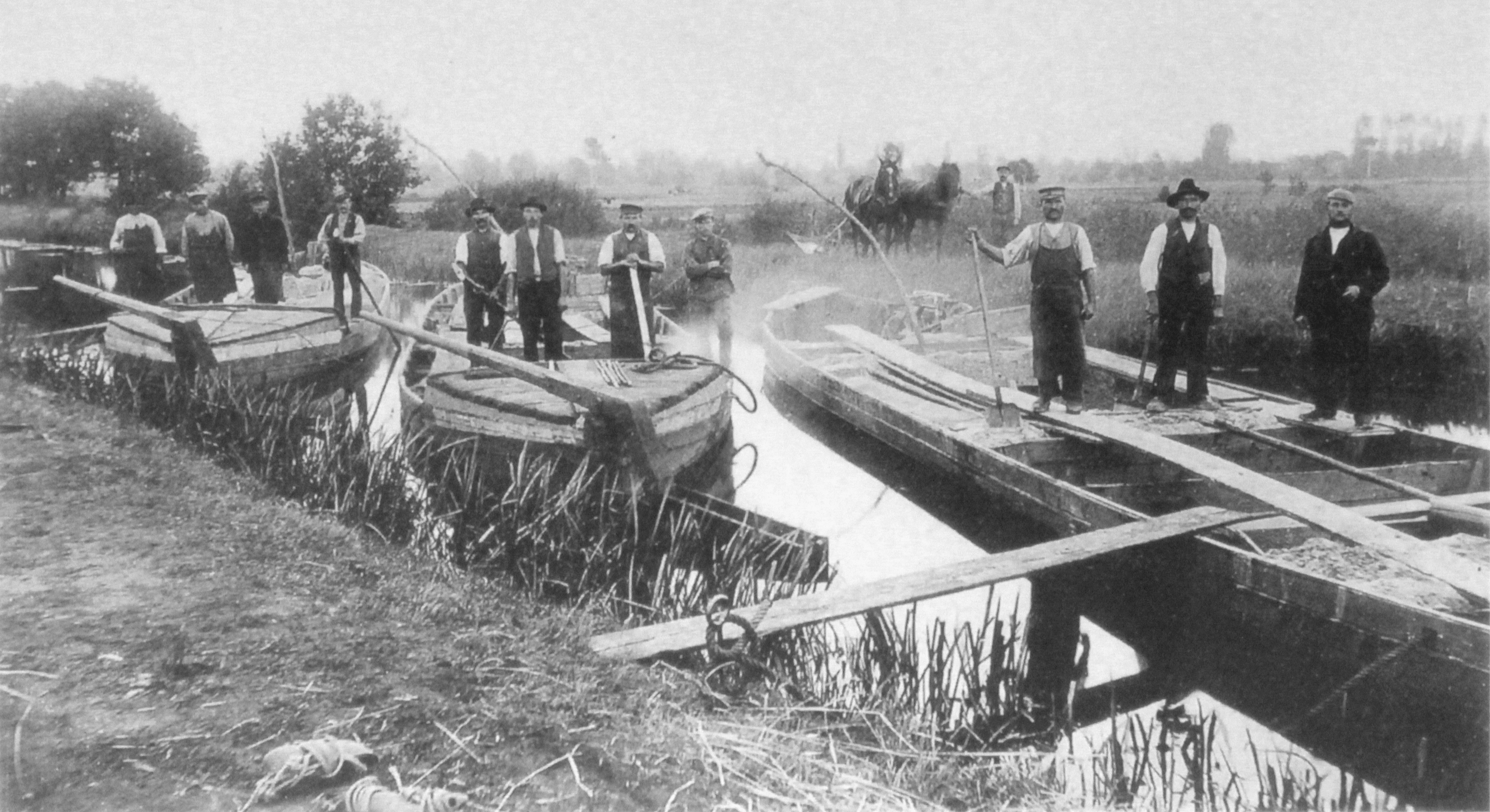
Barges at the clay pit near Wülknitz around 1910

As early as 1827, the Count of Einsiedel managed to secure a new concession on the Saxon side, granting him the privilege of using the canal. When this privilege expired approximately thirty years later, the Gröditz–Grödel section of the canal was opened to general traffic in 1861. During this period, extensive repair and renovation work had become necessary. Subsequently, the political situation allowed for the northern section to be restored to operation. From 1865 to 1869, the sluices along the canal were either renewed or rebuilt, rendering it navigable once more along its entire length. The canal was officially reopened to the public in 1865.

Following its restoration, the canal was also reopened to general traffic in Prussia. On 8 April 1869 new canal regulations took effect in both sections. Initially, these changes had the desired effect, leading to a noticeable increase in the transportation of goods on the canal. However, during this period, the region underwent industrialization. In particular, the numerous emerging lignite mines required fast and efficient transportation links. In response, in 1875, the Berlin-Dresden and Elsterwerda-Riesa railroad lines were built to meet this demand. While the former crossed the canal at Elsterwerda, the latter ran largely parallel to the canal in the direction of Riesa. The introduction of the railroad posed significant competition for the previous mode of goods transportation on the raft canal, leading to a decline in its importance.

In the end, the main function of the canal was to serve the Gröditzer steelworks, with the Saxon section being the primary route of use. The canal was used for transporting construction debris and slag from the steelworks, while sand and clay were transported back. These raw materials were primarily sourced from mines located between Koselitz and Radewitz, which had special light rail lines built to connect to the canal, allowing for the transportation of materials using tipping trucks. Additionally, the canal served as a collecting basin for the cooling water required by the steel plant. As early as 1912, an essay by K. Mende in the local history supplement "Die Schwarze Elster" to the "Liebenwerdaer Kreisblatt" reported, "A transverse dam has been drawn through the Gröditzer sluice, which holds back the Röder water in the section of the canal facing the Elbe." While the Pulsen sluice was still operational at that time, the northern section of the canal was already hardly used and had become overgrown with reeds between Gröditz and Prösen.

=== The vision of an Elbe–Oder canal ===
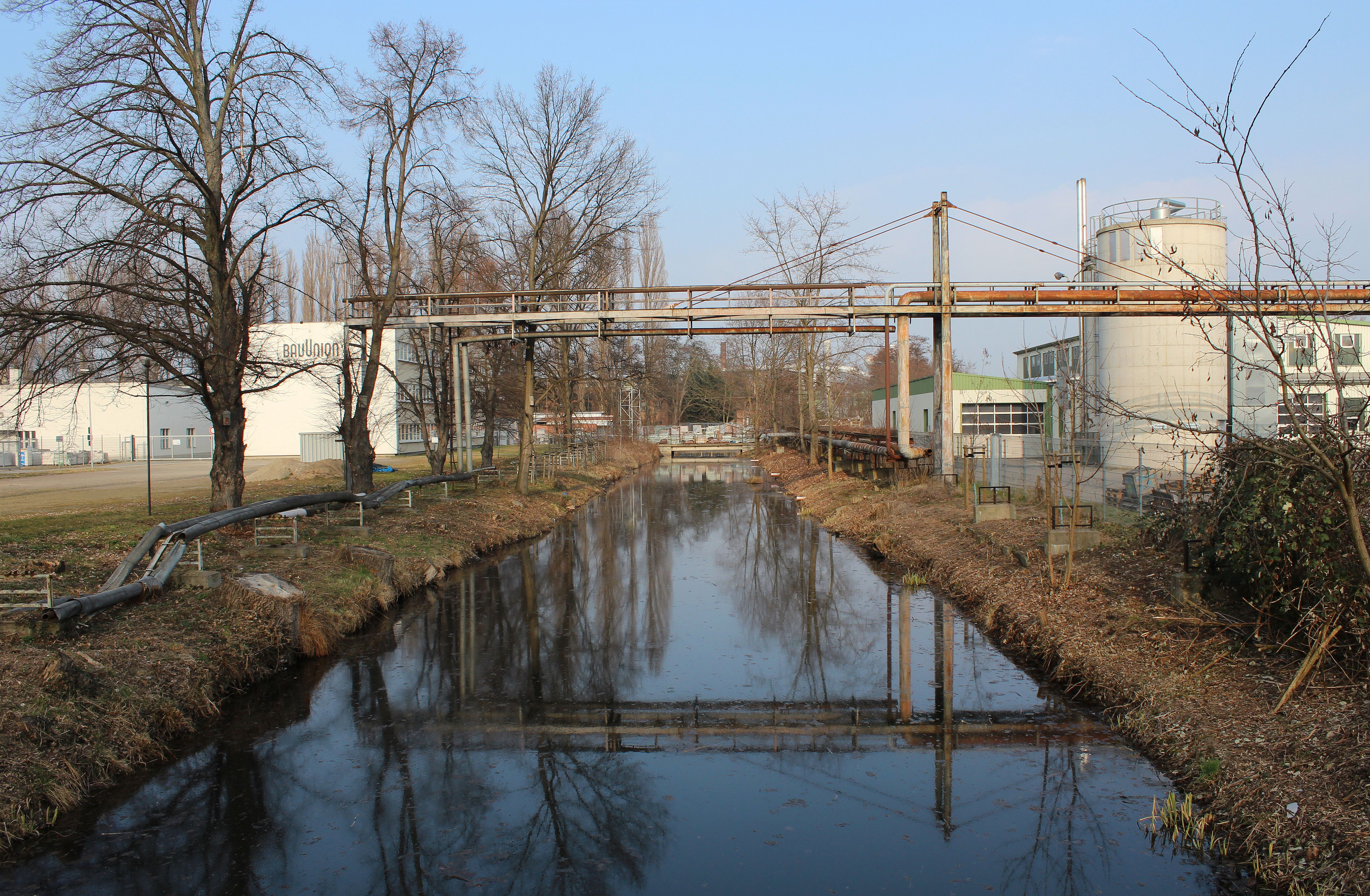
The canal in the area of the Gröditz steelworks

Despite competition from the railroad, waterways remained a focus for transportation routes. Shortly after the establishment of the raft canal, plans were considered to extend it to the Spree River. The primary motivation for these ideas was the continued need for wood resources. In 1754, the authorities once again commissioned Johann Müller, who had proven his expertise, to conduct the initial investigations for this expansion project. In the same year, he presented his initial plans and sketch maps for the extension. However, these plans were accompanied by a comment from Dresden's chief raft inspector Fink, who described it as a "far-out project that will cost a lot of guilders", leading to a decision not to pursue the project further.

At the beginning of the 20th century, experts took up the former ideas again. There were plans to build a large shipping canal that would connect the Elbe with the Oder via the Schwarze Elster and the Spree. This was intended for cargo ships of up to 1000 tons, a length of 80 meters, a width of 9.2 meters, and a draft of 1.75 to 2.00 meters and above. The variants under consideration were to include sections of the Elsterwerda–Grödel raft canal and the Schraden area. Although a canal construction office was established in January 1928 in Senftenberg, whose lignite mining district would have benefited from the canal the most, the construction of the navigation route ultimately did not materialize and the projects did not get beyond the planning stage until World War II.

=== The end as a traffic route and the economic use ===
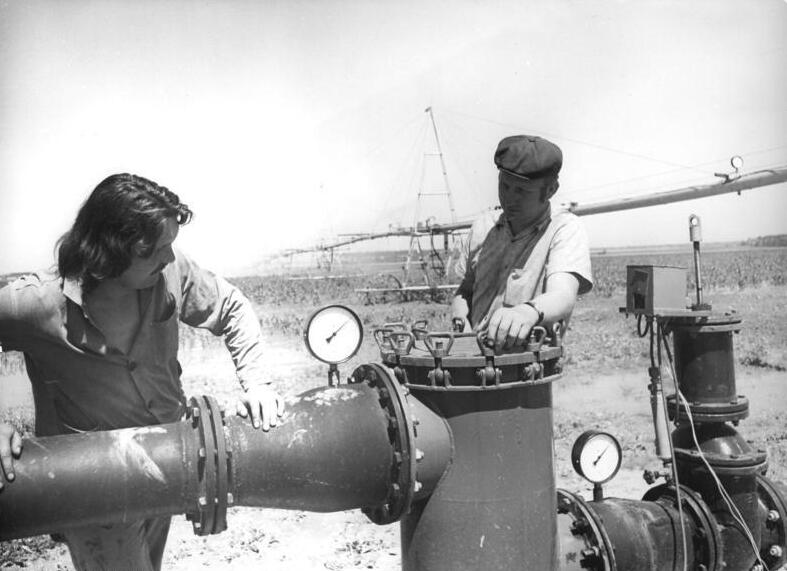
Inspection work on a sprinkler system in Glaubitz in 1976

In the early 1930s, the steel mill had expanded significantly, and this growth required extending its production facilities across the canal. As a result, the section of the canal within the plant area, which was already underutilized, was filled in without significant effort in 1934/35. This process was repeated in 1940/41. Subsequently, the canal's operation continued to decline, with the last barge passing through the canal on 24 July 1942.

Following the last barge's passage on 24 July 1942, the canal ceased to function as a traffic route. Its primary role shifted towards supplying water to the industrial facilities situated alongside the canal. It's worth noting that in the 1950s, there were specific plans to revive the canal as a shipping route to the Elbe, even including the construction of a harbor at the Gröditzer steelworks, this project was also shelved.

During the late 1960s, the canal experienced a resurgence in use, primarily for agricultural purposes in the former German Democratic Republic (GDR). As agriculture intensified in Kleine Röder, the canal served as a source of irrigation for the surrounding fields and meadows. Water from the canal was distributed to these areas through extensive sprinkler systems, supported by a network of pipes stretching over 178 kilometers. Pumping stations were strategically placed along the canal to supply water to the system. Additionally, a ditch system extended the water supply westward to Spansberg, near Gröditz, where additional pumping stations and a storage basin were located. In Grödel, a Hungarian-made pumping station, floating on the Elbe River, lifted water into the canal's basin. This system could pump up to 2.4 cubic meters per second, ultimately irrigating a total of 5,176 hectares of land. In 1989, approximately 6.2 million cubic meters of water were drawn from the Elbe River, with a maximum daily output of 113,200 cubic meters.

With the economic upheaval at the time of reunification, this use also came to an end at the beginning of the 1990s, because the agricultural production cooperatives were dissolved and no operator could be found for the operation of the huge plant, which required a great deal of manpower.

=== Effects of canal construction on the region ===
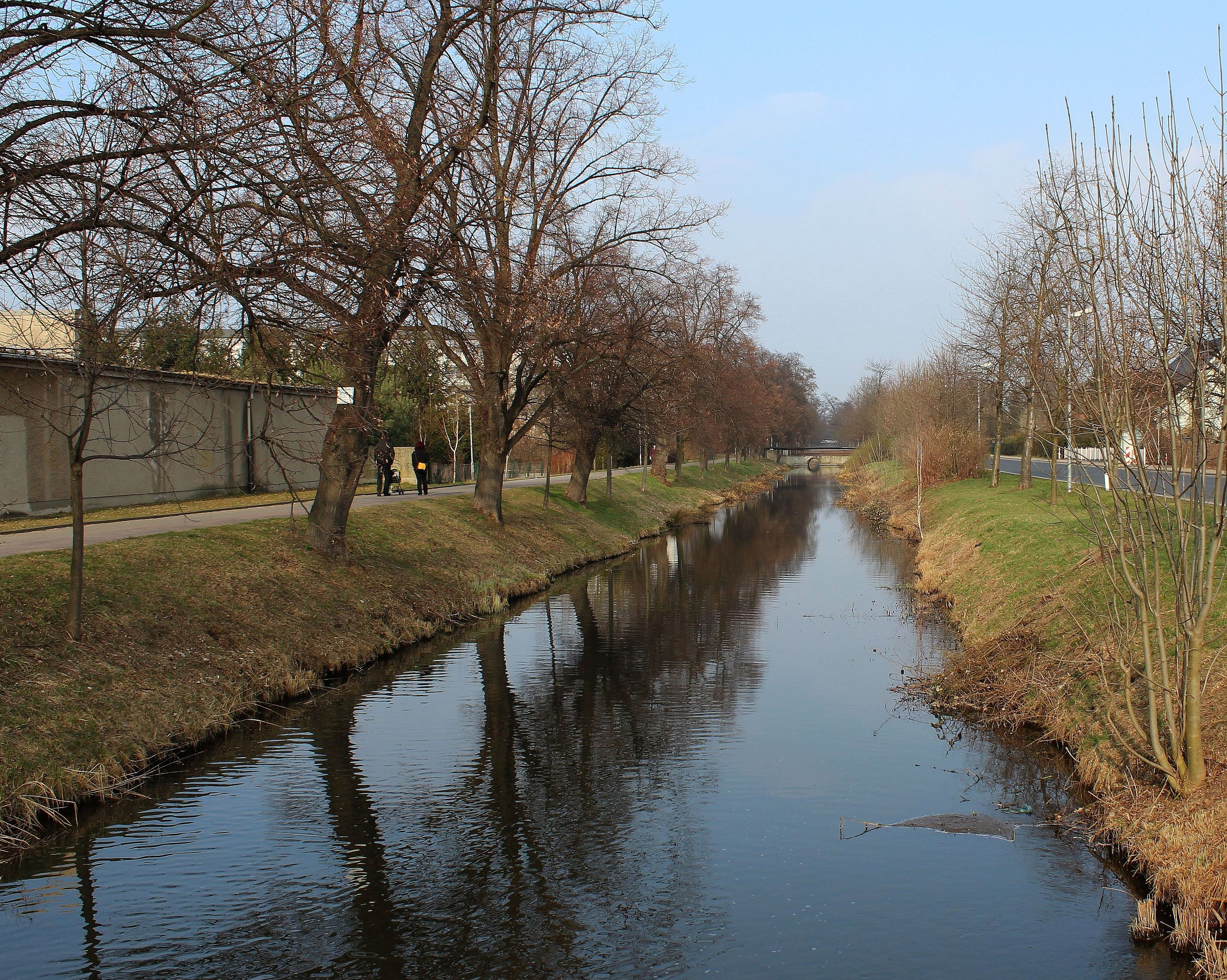
The canal in the Gröditz residential area

The construction of the canal had a significant impact on improving the region's transport links. Although the project's original intention may not have been for this purpose, it ultimately benefited the riparian communities and the entire region. The presence of the canal created job opportunities for its management, and it provided an efficient means of transporting larger quantities of materials and merchandise quickly and cost-effectively through the established waterway. Additionally, the canal became a popular fishing spot for the local population. As transport activities on the canal decreased over time, a fishing cooperative was established, which divided and leased sections of the canal for fishing purposes. Furthermore, the canal served various other functions, including as a place for washing horses, harvesting ice, and even as a bathing area, demonstrating its versatility.

The construction of the raft canal in Gröditz played a pivotal role in the industrial development of the village. The community, which previously consisted of only a few houses, grew like some surrounding communities primarily due to the steel mill that settled here, which led to further industrial settlements. In 1836, Gröditz had just 150 inhabitants, but shortly before the construction of the Elsterwerda-Riesa railroad, it had already expanded to 545 residents. This growth of the community continued, and in 1967, Gröditz was granted town status. By 1968, the population had increased to 8,100 inhabitants, and it continued to rise, surpassing 10,000 residents by the end of the 1980s.

Following the construction of the canal, the villages of Langenberg and Marksiedlitz experienced a revival after previously being in a state of decline.

== The historical infrastructure of the canal ==
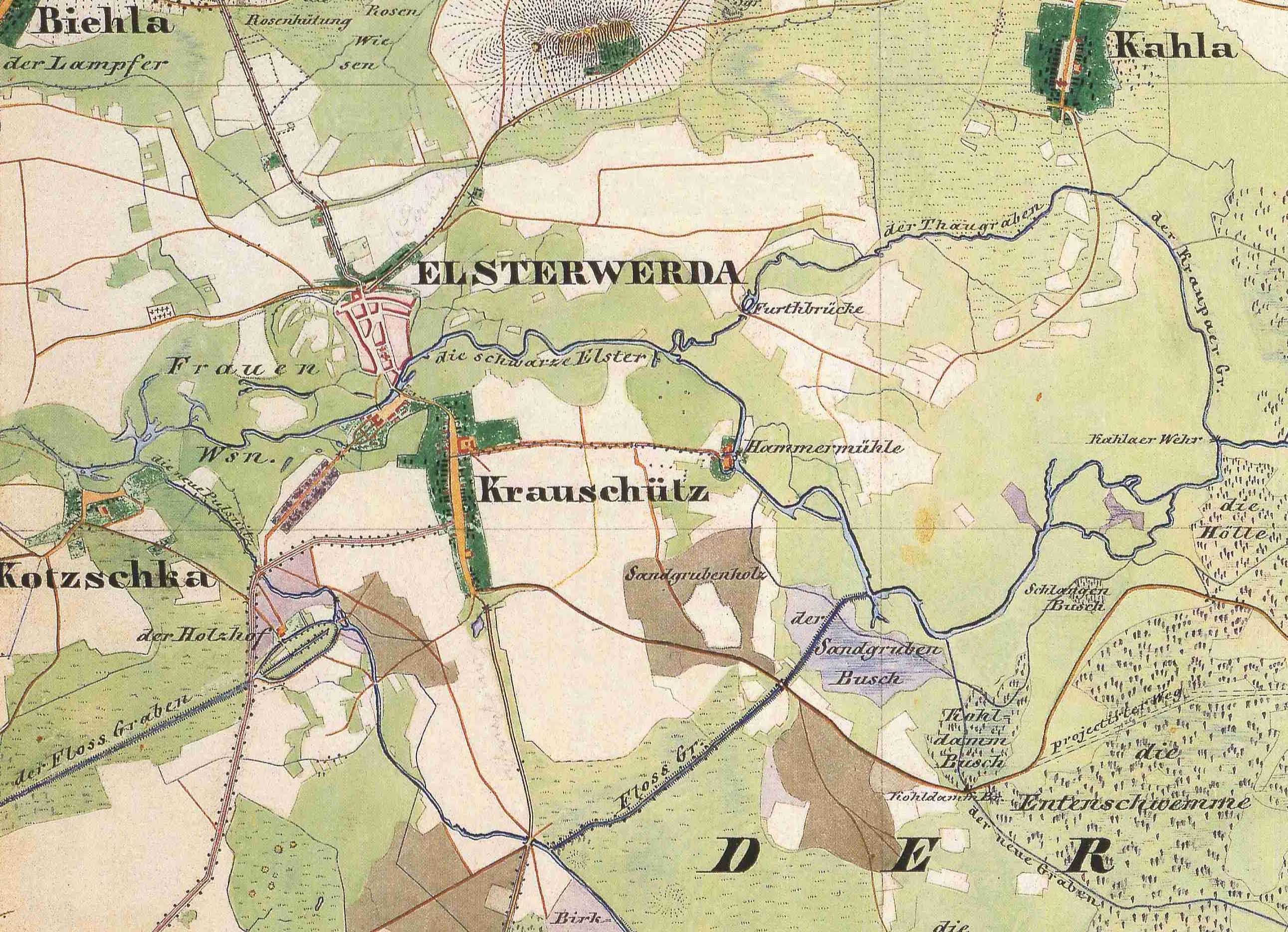
The river and ditch system in Elsterwerda around 1847.

The personnel involved in the operation of the rafting canal, including loggers, administrators at the Elsterwerda and Grödel timber yards, sluice pullers, and bombers, were under the authority of the raft master. The hierarchy extended to positions such as the chief raft commissioner, chief raft inspector, and raft director. Following the division of Saxony and the implementation of new canal regulations on 1 May 1869, overall supervision of the Saxon section was overseen by the hydraulic engineering inspector in Riesa, while the Prussian section was under the jurisdiction of the construction inspector in Herzberg. Their responsibilities included ensuring compliance with canal regulations, which encompassed matters like canal rates, sluice fees, and ship dimensions.

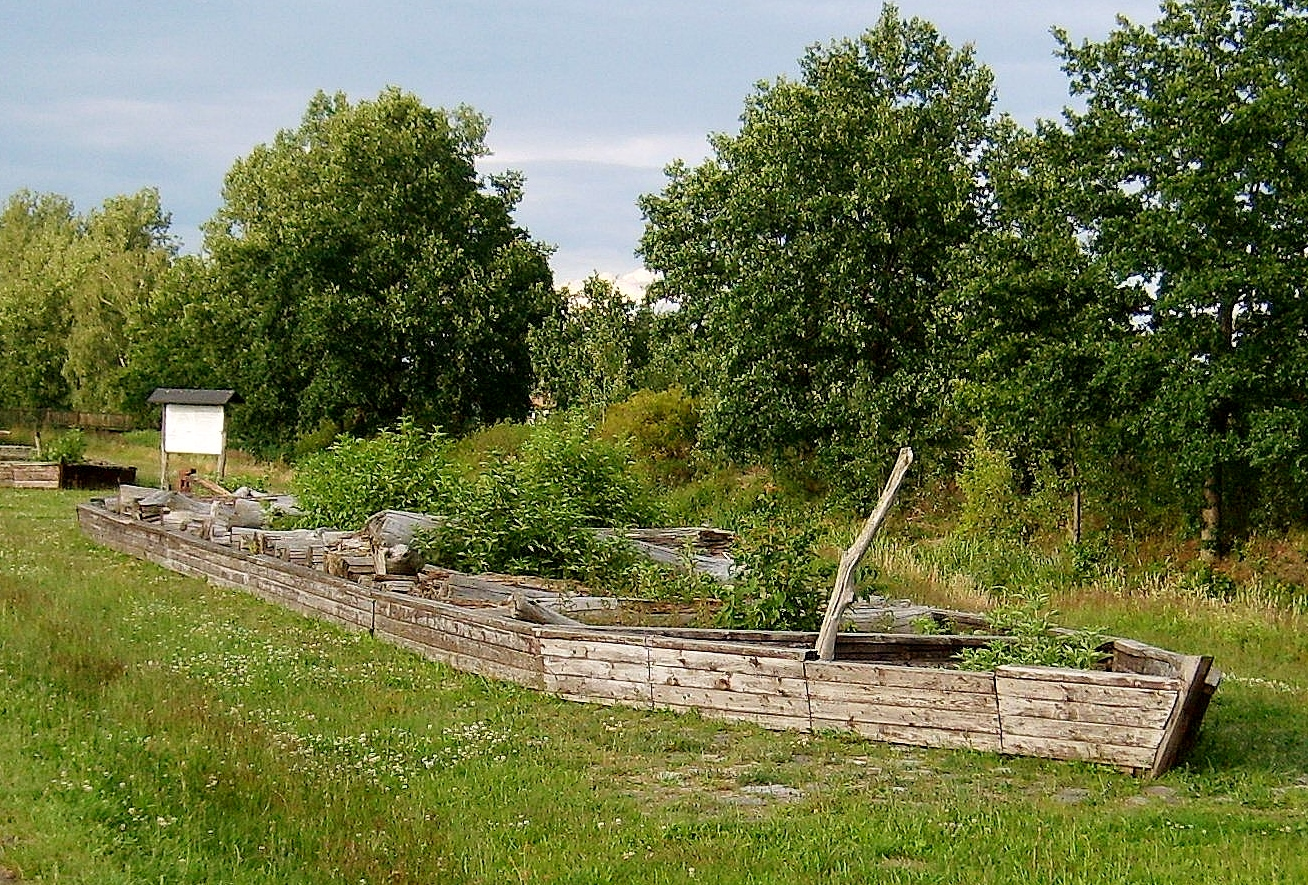
Model of a barge operating on the canal

The logs were primarily transported through various channels, including the main raft ditch, the Pulsnitz, and the Schwarze Elster, making their way to the lumber yard in Elsterwerda. Upon arrival, they were temporarily stored, then split into logs, and loaded onto barges. These barges were subsequently towed to their intended destinations, with Grödel's timber yard being a common initial destination. At the Grödel lumber yard, the freight underwent further temporary storage or was reloaded onto ships and barges that operated on the Elbe.

The specialized barges designed for timber transport were towed along the canal by a crew consisting of a helmsman and four shipwrights. These barges had a capacity of approximately 200 cubic meters of timber and measured about 26 meters in length and around 3.25 meters in width, with a draught of 0.95 meters. As the waterway later began to be used for general and bulk cargo, different designs were employed, capable of carrying approximately 25 tons. These newer vessels were shorter, measuring about 19 meters in length. Additionally, in the early 20th century, motor ships were also introduced for transportation on the canal.

The canal, which needed a water depth of approximately 1.50 meters to function, received its water supply from the three estuary branches of the Große Röder: the Große Röder itself, the Kleine Röder, and the Geißlitz. Among these, the Kleine Röder, with the highest water level among the three, played a significant role in maintaining the water levels in the canal.

In the northern section, the Pulsnitz initially played a role in maintaining water levels. However, this led to drainage issues in the already marshy Pulsnitz lowlands in the Schraden region. Consequently, the construction of a fourth sluice was necessary in this area. Similar problems arose when the canal crossed the Röder. Initially, three drainage ditches for the terrain were utilized, and these ditches were passed under the canal using culverts, eliminating the need for pumps.

The differences in elevation between the Pulsnitz or the Schwarze Elster and the Elbe were initially overcome using three chamber sluices built in wooden construction, the Prösen sluice (2.80 m), the Gröditz sluice (2.25 m) and the Pulsen sluice (0.65 m) were constructed. Due to ongoing issues at the Prösen sluice, it was rebuilt in stone in 1755 and further renewed in 1766/67. Additionally, a fourth sluice, the Elsterwerda sluice, was added in 1766. The chamber sluices had a usable length of 42.70 meters. They were 8.70 meters wide, and the sluice openings on both sides were 5.70 meters. Typically, it took around 12 minutes for a vessel to pass through one sluice.

Originally, there were plans to connect the canal to the Elbe using a double sluice system, allowing canal barges to continue their journey on the Elbe. However, opponents of the Prieschka-Stehla route had concerns, including the potential impact of regular river flooding on the sluices. These concerns materialized during the construction of Grödel. Strong ice runs and a dam break near Nünchritz caused significant damage and additional costs. Ultimately, the construction difficulties were deemed too serious, and the sluice construction was abandoned in favor of building a basin directly on the Elbe River.

== Current use for local recreational purposes ==
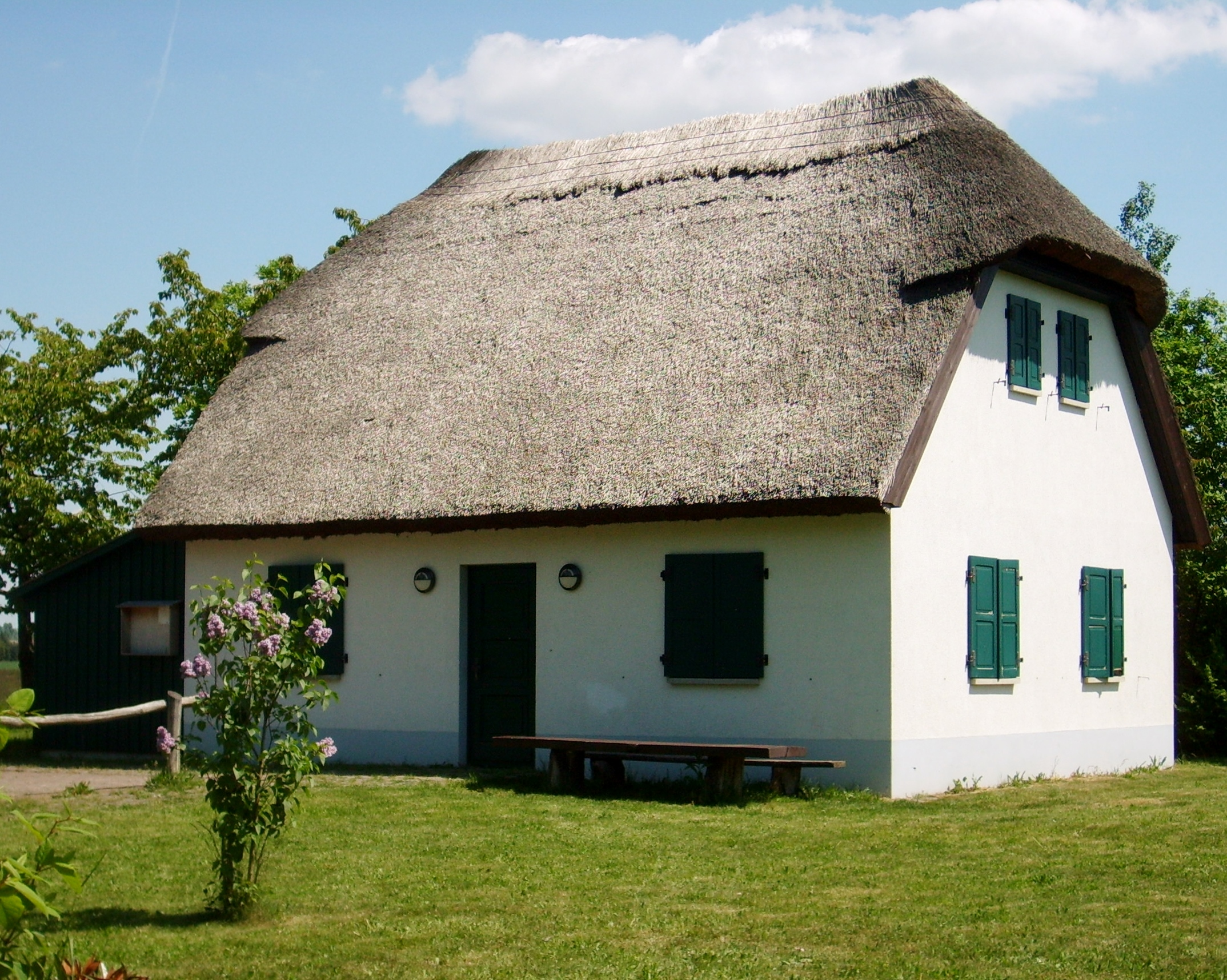
Prösen lock house (replica)

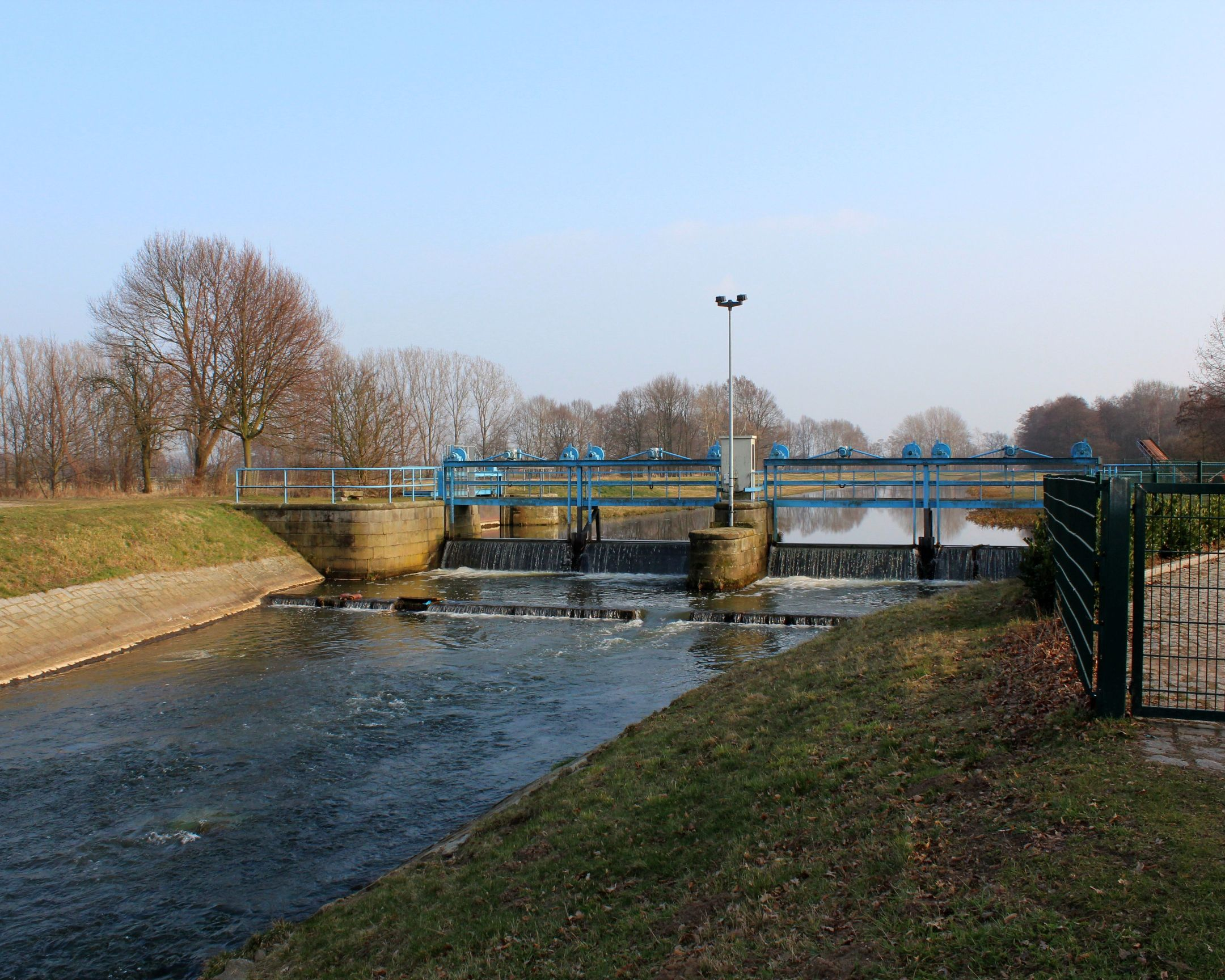
The Geißlitz at the intersection with the Elsterwerda–Grödel raft canal near Gröditz and Pulsen.

The Elsterwerda–Grödel raft canal has held the status of a historical monument since 1978. It has limited significance for water management. Today, it is primarily used for local recreation and fishing. In Saxony, its water maintenance is overseen by the river maintenance in Riesa, which maintains a depot near the Pulsen sluice. Here it is a water body I. order. In Brandenburg, where it falls under the II. order, the Gewässerverband Kleine Elster-Pulsnitz is responsible.

Additionally, on the grounds of Elsterwerda's Holzhof, the most traditional sports facility in the town is located. It has been a popular destination for excursions since the mid-19th century, and several sports facilities were constructed there in the early 20th century, which have since been expanded and developed.

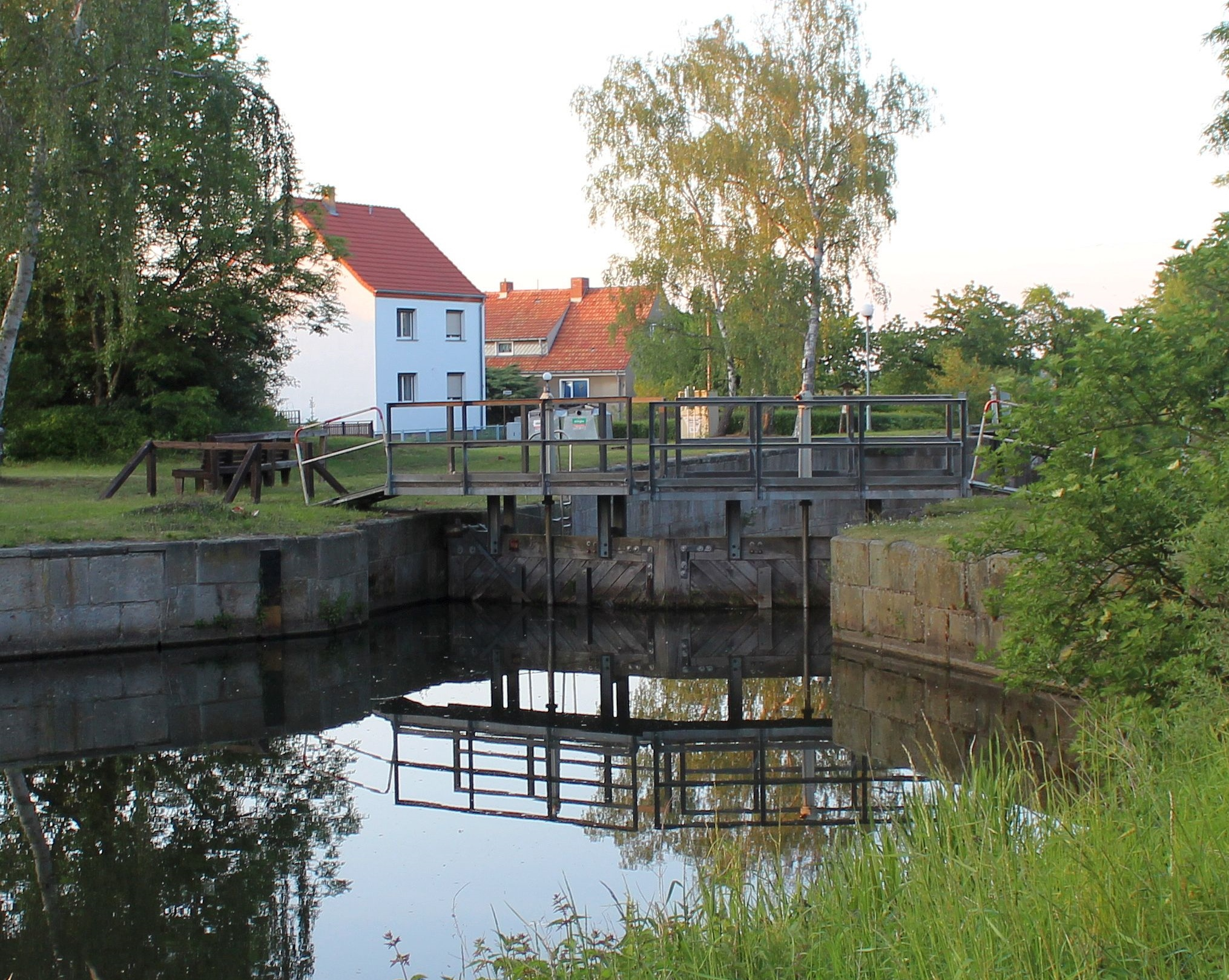
The Elsterwerda–Grödel raft canal at the lock in Prösen

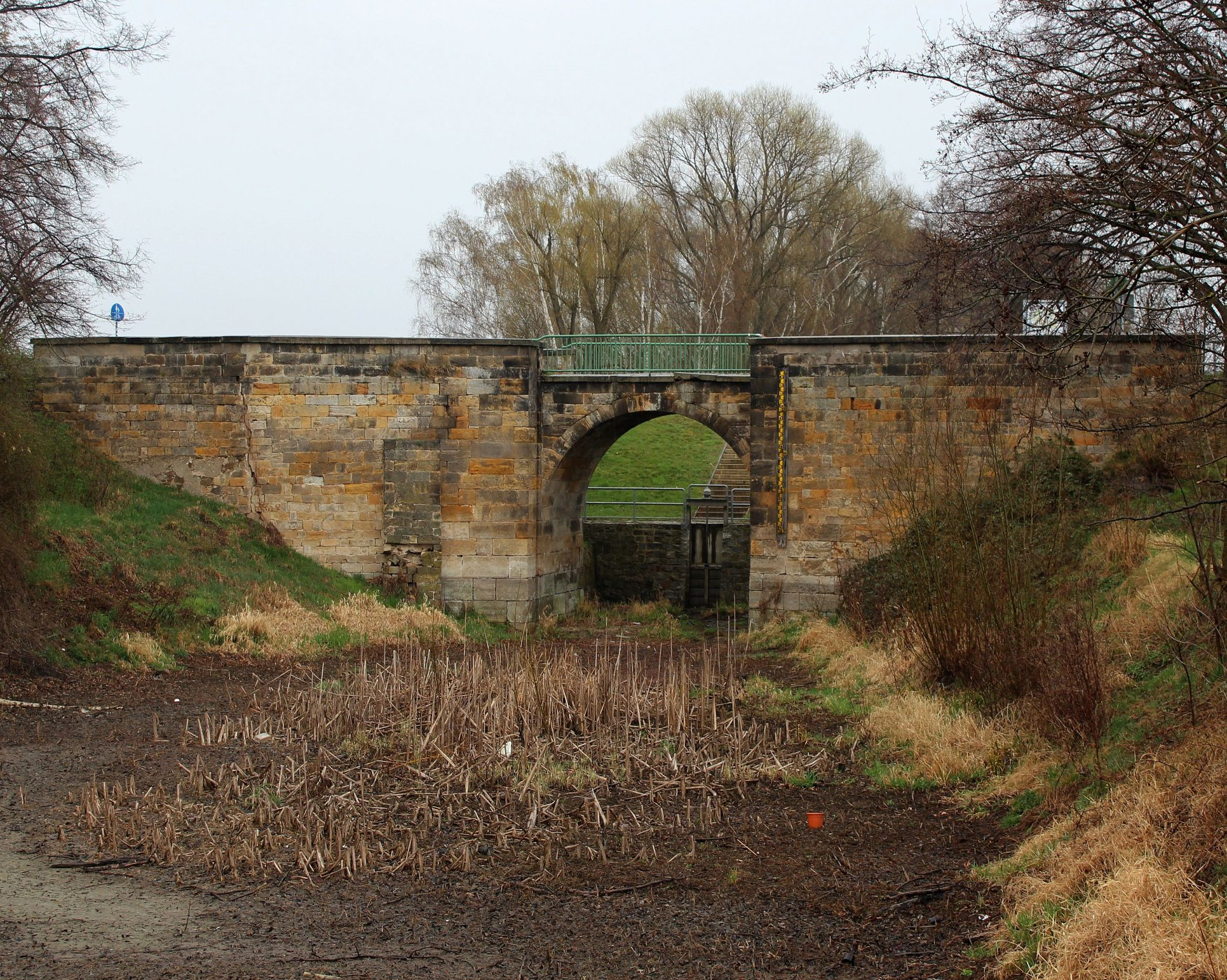
The bridge on the Elsterwerda–Grödel raft canal in Grödel

Reconstruction work on the sluice in Prösen in 1993 aimed to provide a historical perspective on the canal's history. The wooden sluice gates, which had long been absent, were rebuilt as part of this effort. The sluice keeper's house in Prösen, which had been demolished in 1954 due to its deteriorating condition, used to stand nearby. Today, there is a gastronomic facility at its original location. In 2001, a replica of the local sluicekeeper’s house was constructed not far from the sluice. An exhibition on the history of the "Floßkanal," (raft canal) featuring two replicas of the barges that operated on the canal and informative display boards, was also present in the vicinity for an extended period.

Several interrupted bike paths run parallel to the canal, with some located on the embankment. Touristic access to these trails is provided by the Floßkanalroute, a bicycle trail that connects the Elberadweg from Grödel with the Schwarze-Elster-Radweg. One can still see the former towpath along some kilometers of the water's banks. Other visible remnants of the canal's history include widened sections for the meeting of barges, the remains of the sluices in Elsterwerda and Pulsen, and in Grödel, two arched bridges from the time when the canal was built. In some places, one can also find the foundations of the overhead power line that once ran alongside the canal, considered the first high-voltage line with an operating voltage of over 100 kV in Europe. Additionally, a historical boundary stone marks the Saxon-Brandenburg border.

Other sights in the area include Elsterwerda Castle, Koselitz Ponds, Tiefenau Baroque Garden with a preserved castle church, and the manor park in Grödel. In addition, four landscape-defining obelisks made of sandstone, which marked the terrain of the Zeithain pleasure camp in the 18th century, have been preserved near Glaubitz, Streumen, and Zeithain.

== See also ==
- Holzhof Elsterwerda
