= Elsterwerda =

- Town
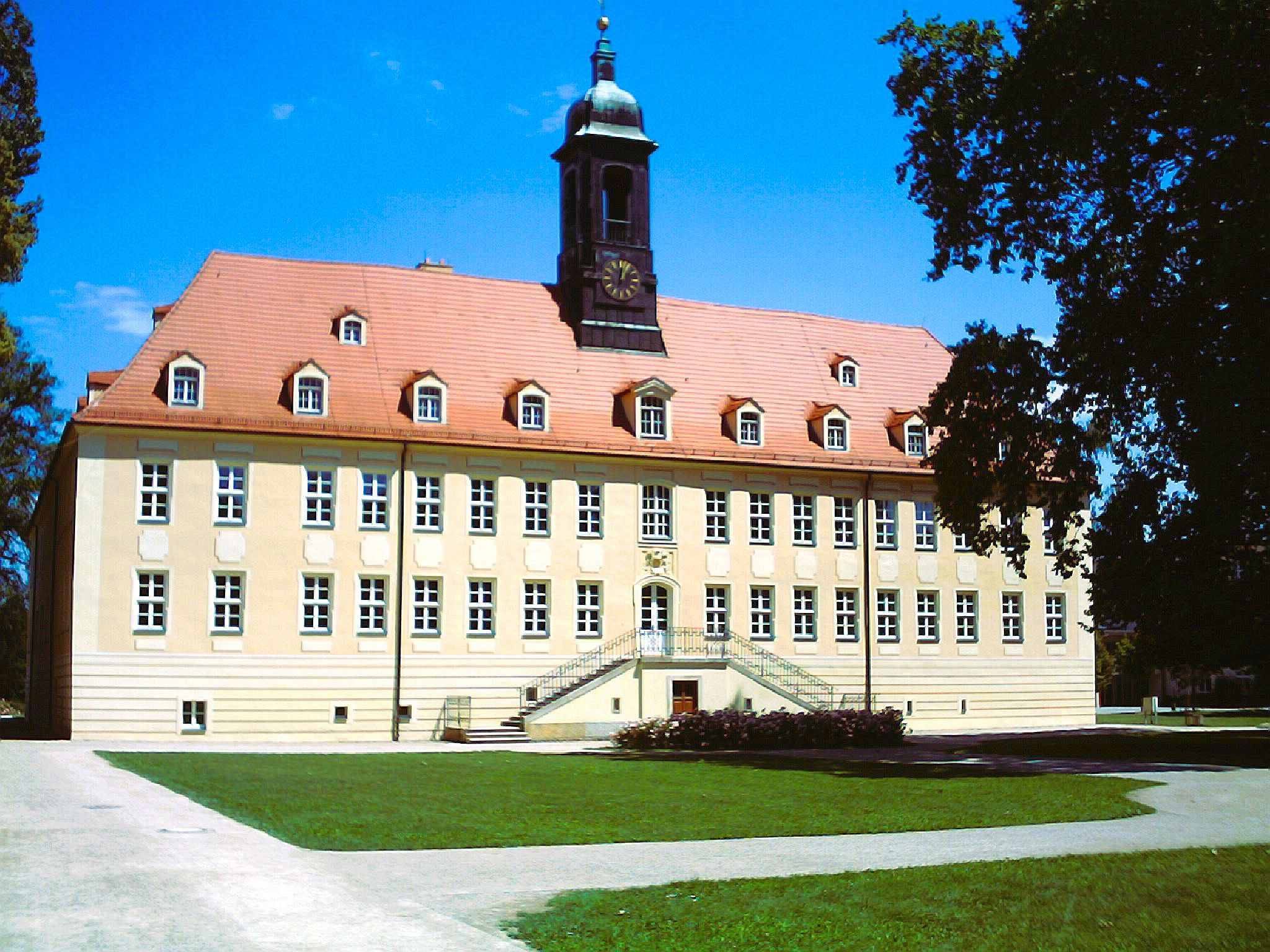
- Château

- Coat of arms

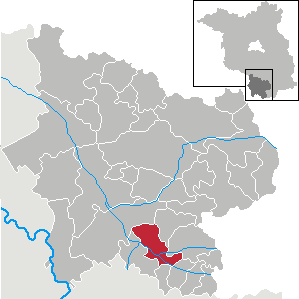
- Location of Elsterwerda within Elbe-Elster district
- Interactive map of Elsterwerda
- Location within Germany Location within Brandenburg
- Coordinates: 51°27′28″N 13°31′26″E
- Country: Germany
- State: Brandenburg
- District: Elbe-Elster
- Subdivisions: Town centre and 2 districts

Government
  - Mayor (2017–25): Anja Heinrich (CDU)

Area
  - Total: 40.58 km^{2} (15.67 sq mi)
- Elevation: 90 m (300 ft)

Population (2025-12-31)
  - Total: 7,592
  - Density: 187.1/km^{2} (484.6/sq mi)
- Time zone: UTC+01:00 (CET)
  - Summer (DST): UTC+02:00 (CEST)
- Postal codes: 04910
- Dialling codes: 03533
- Vehicle registration: EE, FI, LIB
- Website: www.elsterwerda.de

Elsterwerda (German pronunciation: [ˌɛlstɐˈvɛʁda]; Lower Sorbian: Wikow) is a town in the Elbe-Elster district, in southwestern Brandenburg, Germany. It is situated on the Black Elster river, 48 km northwest of Dresden, and 11 km southeast of Bad Liebenwerda.

== History ==
From 1952 to 1990, Elsterwerda was part of the Bezirk Cottbus of East Germany.

== Demography ==
Development of Population since 1875 within the Current Boundaries (Blue Line: Population; Dotted Line: Comparison to Population Development of Brandenburg state; Grey Background: Time of Nazi rule; Red Background: Time of Communist rule)

Recent Population Development and Projections (Population Development before Census 2011 (blue line); Recent Population Development according to the Census in Germany in 2011 (blue bordered line); Official projections for 2005-2030 (yellow line); for 2020-2030 (green line); for 2017-2030 (scarlet line)

Elsterwerda: Population development
within the current boundaries (2017)

Year	Pop.	±% p.a.
1875	3,193	—
1890	3,705	+1.00%
1910	7,024	+3.25%
1925	8,359	+1.17%
1933	8,738	+0.56%
1939	9,560	+1.51%
1946	10,966	+1.98%
1950	11,461	+1.11%
1964	11,157	−0.19%
1971	11,443	+0.36%
1981	11,572	+0.11%
1985	11,517	−0.12%
1989	11,255	−0.57%
1990	11,033	−1.97%
1991	10,947	−0.78%

Year	Pop.	±% p.a.
1992	10,868	−0.72%
1993	10,793	−0.69%
1994	10,726	−0.62%
1995	10,656	−0.65%
1996	10,538	−1.11%
1997	10,442	−0.91%
1998	10,382	−0.57%
1999	10,334	−0.46%
2000	10,234	−0.97%
2001	9,937	−2.90%
2002	9,911	−0.26%
2003	9,804	−1.08%
2004	9,654	−1.53%
2005	9,456	−2.05%
2006	9,249	−2.19%

Year	Pop.	±% p.a.
2007	9,096	−1.65%
2008	8,959	−1.51%
2009	8,817	−1.58%
2010	8,694	−1.40%
2011	8,498	−2.25%
2012	8,384	−1.34%
2013	8,287	−1.16%
2014	8,161	−1.52%
2015	8,186	+0.31%
2016	8,118	−0.83%
2017	7,975	−1.76%
2018	7,856	−1.49%
2019	7,853	−0.04%
2020	7,800	−0.67%

== Gallery ==
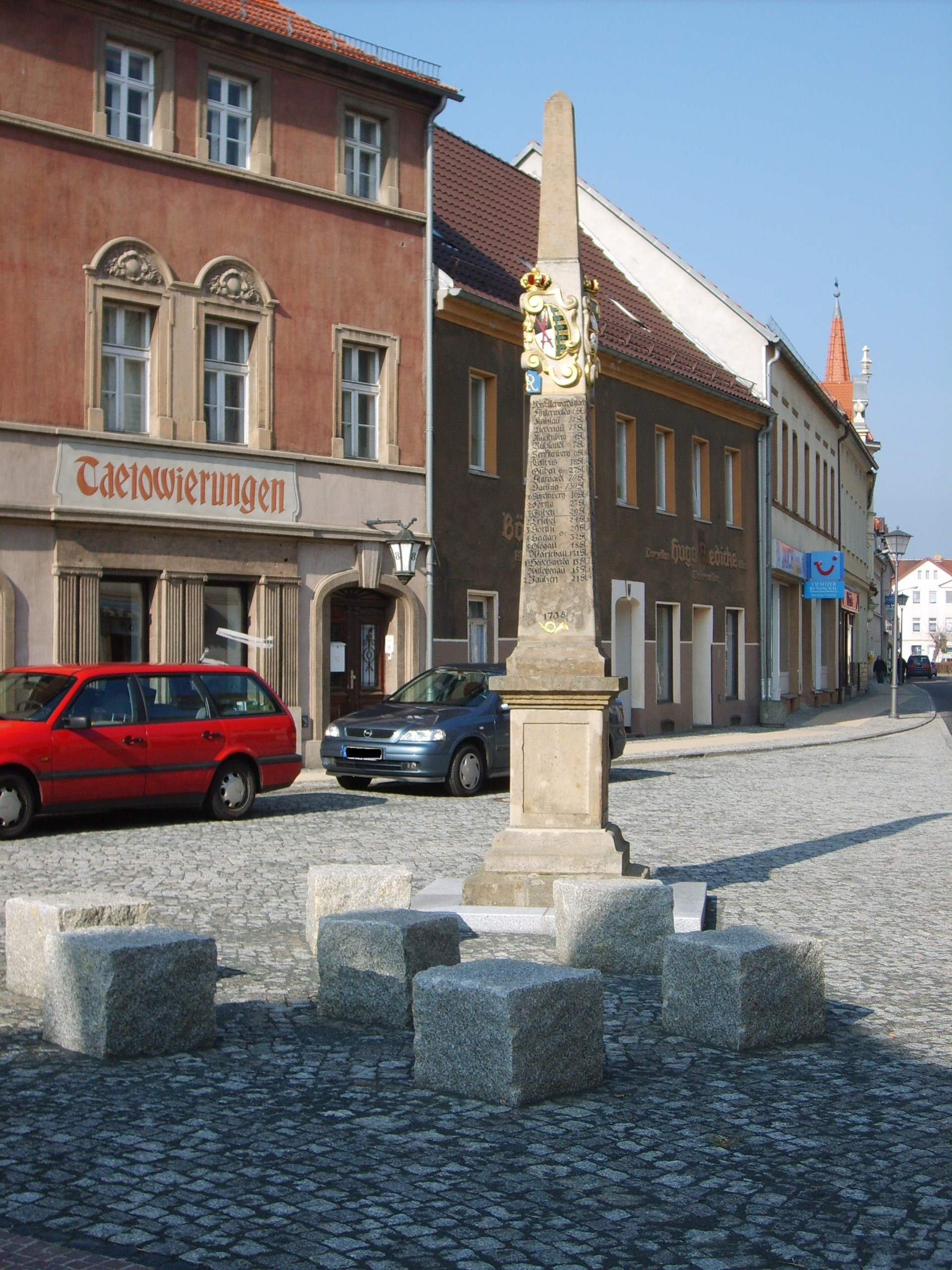
City

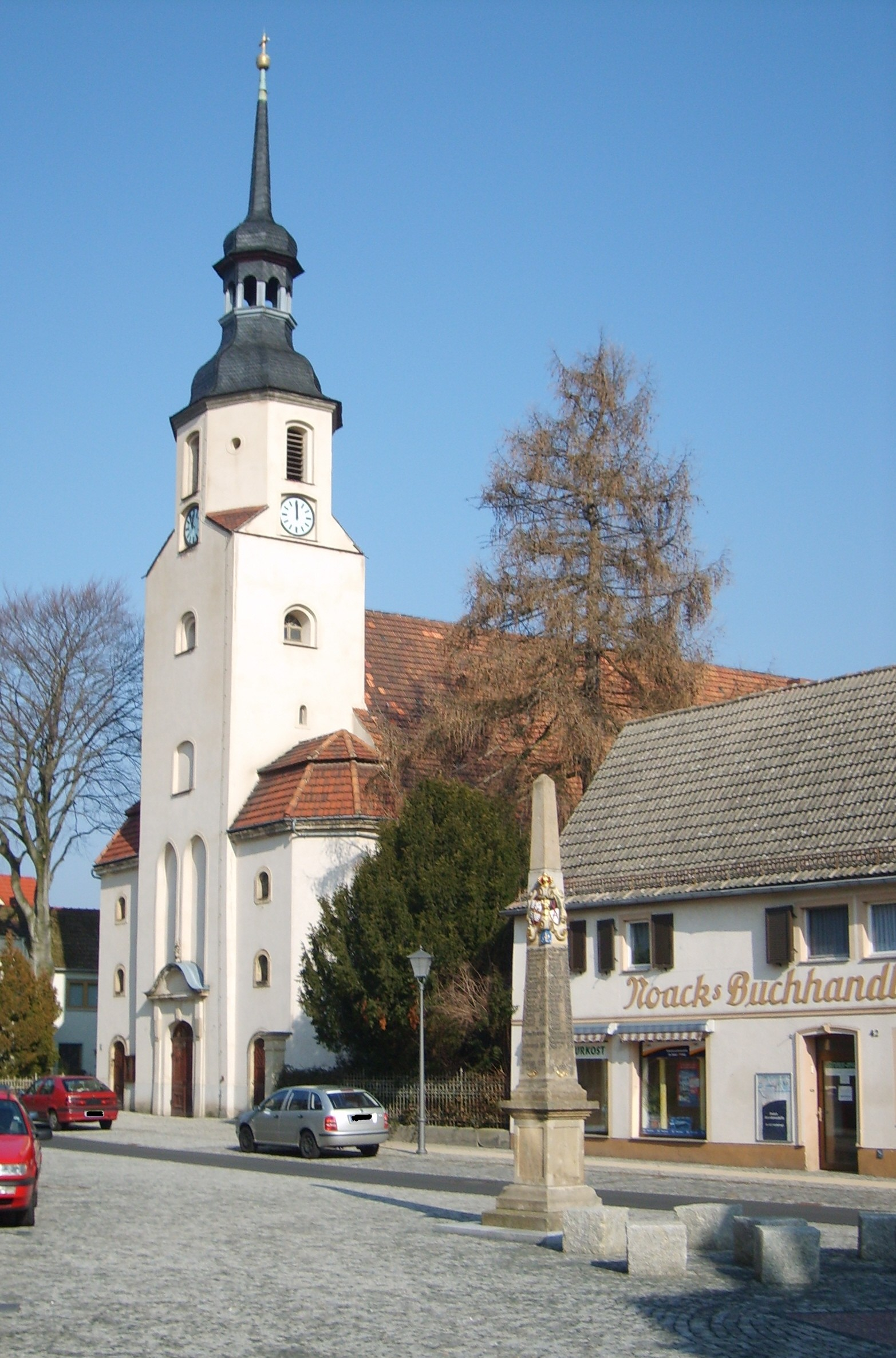
Church „St. Katharina“

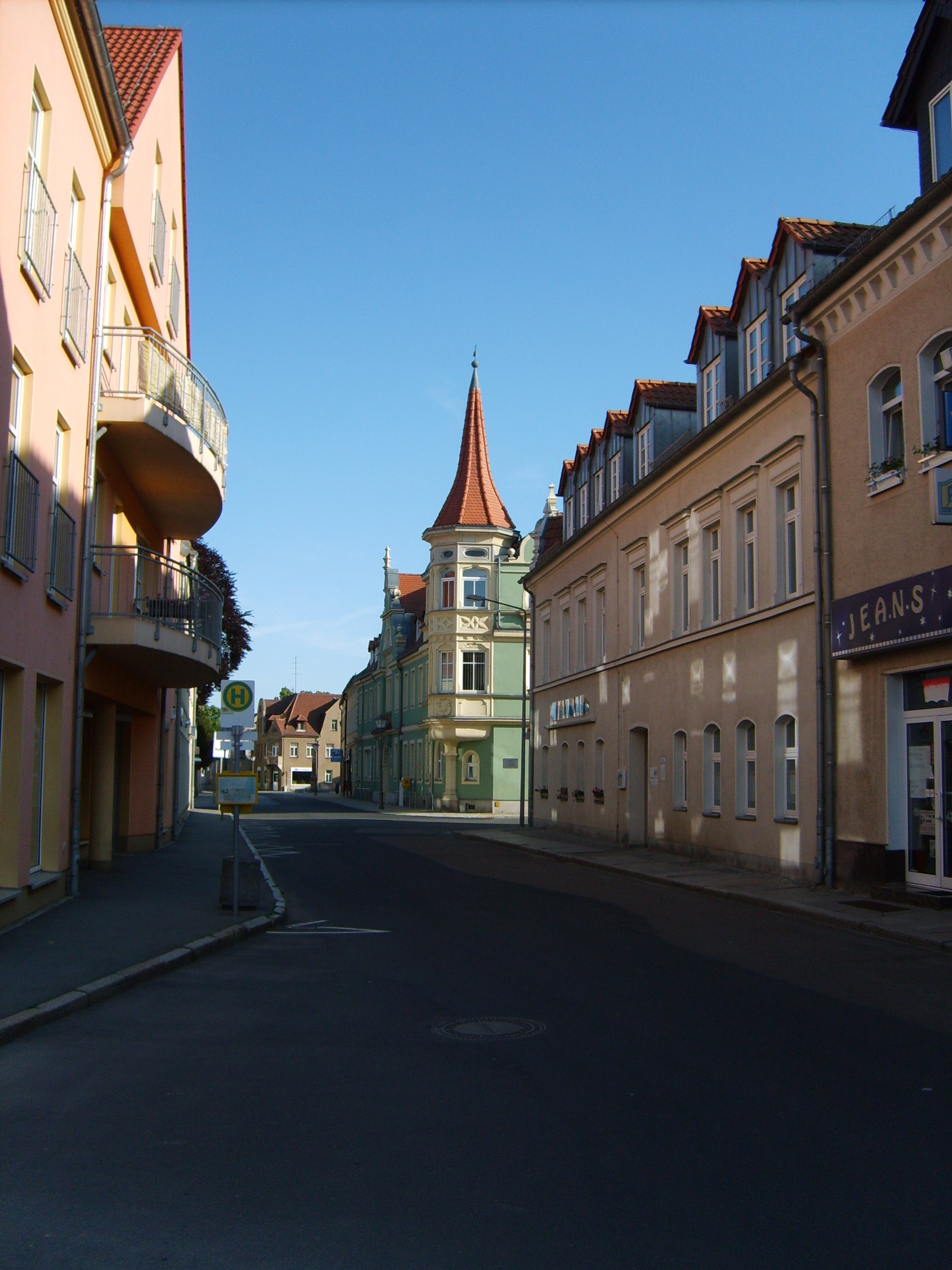
City hall

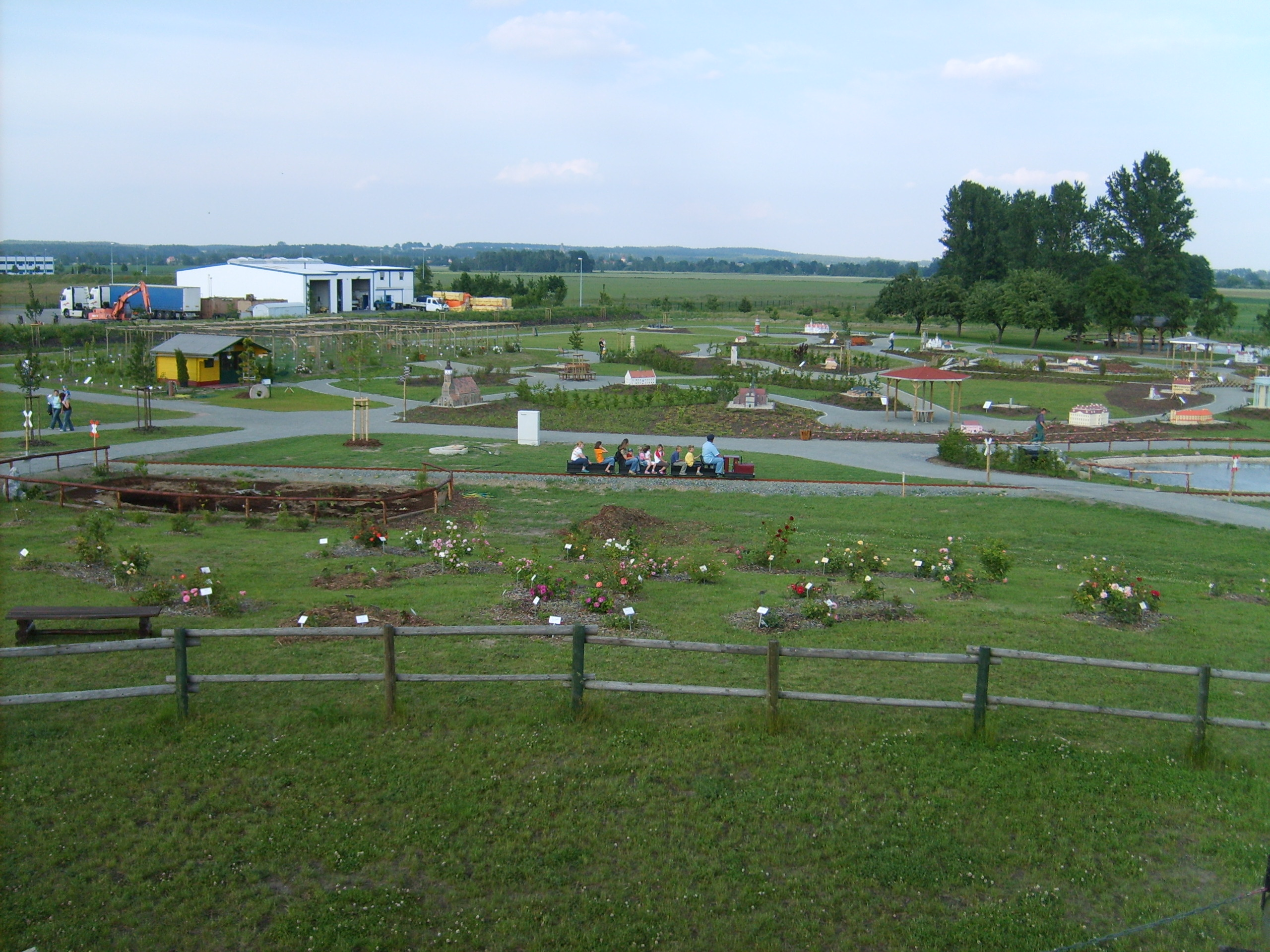
Miniature park

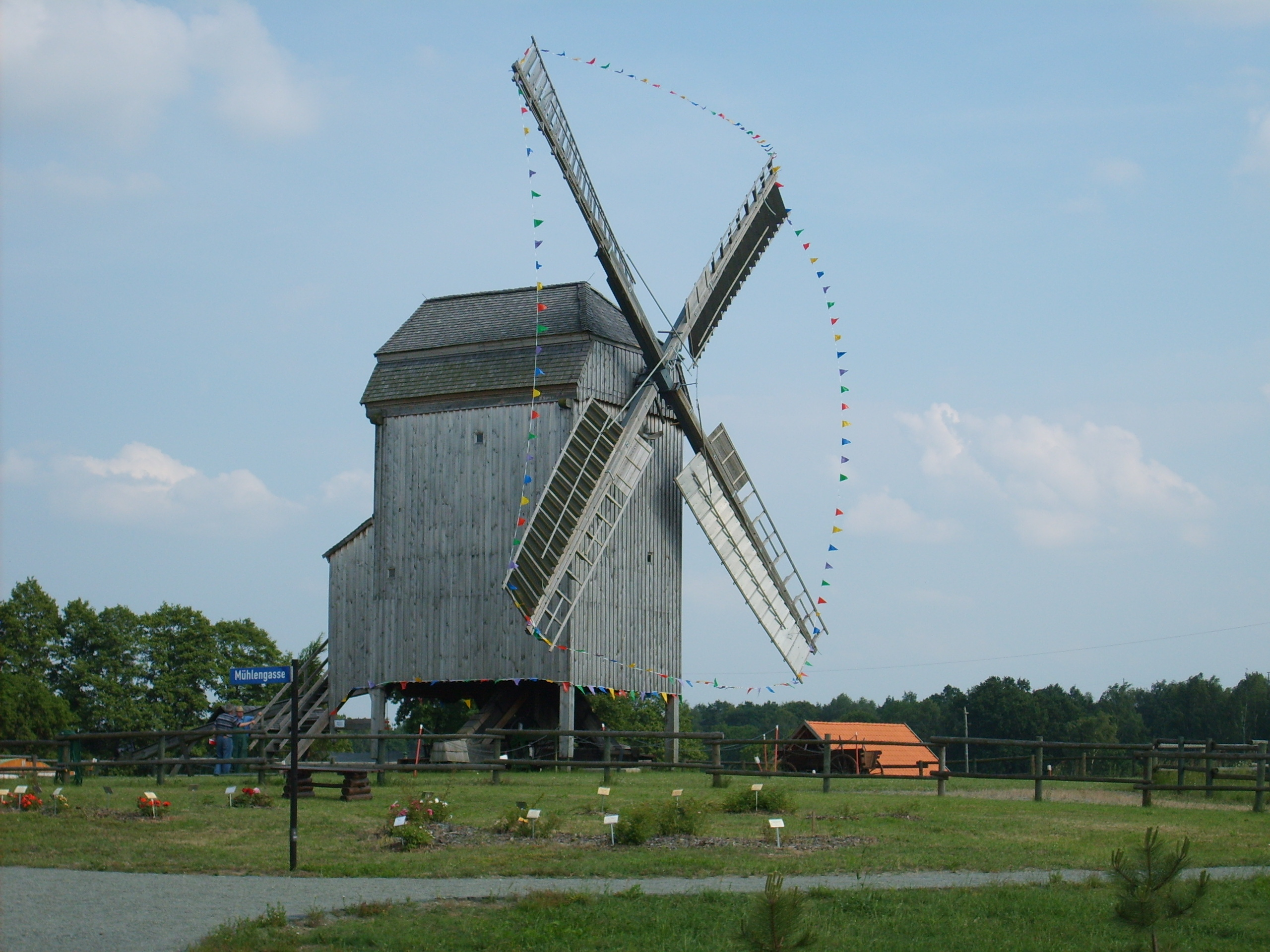
Windmill

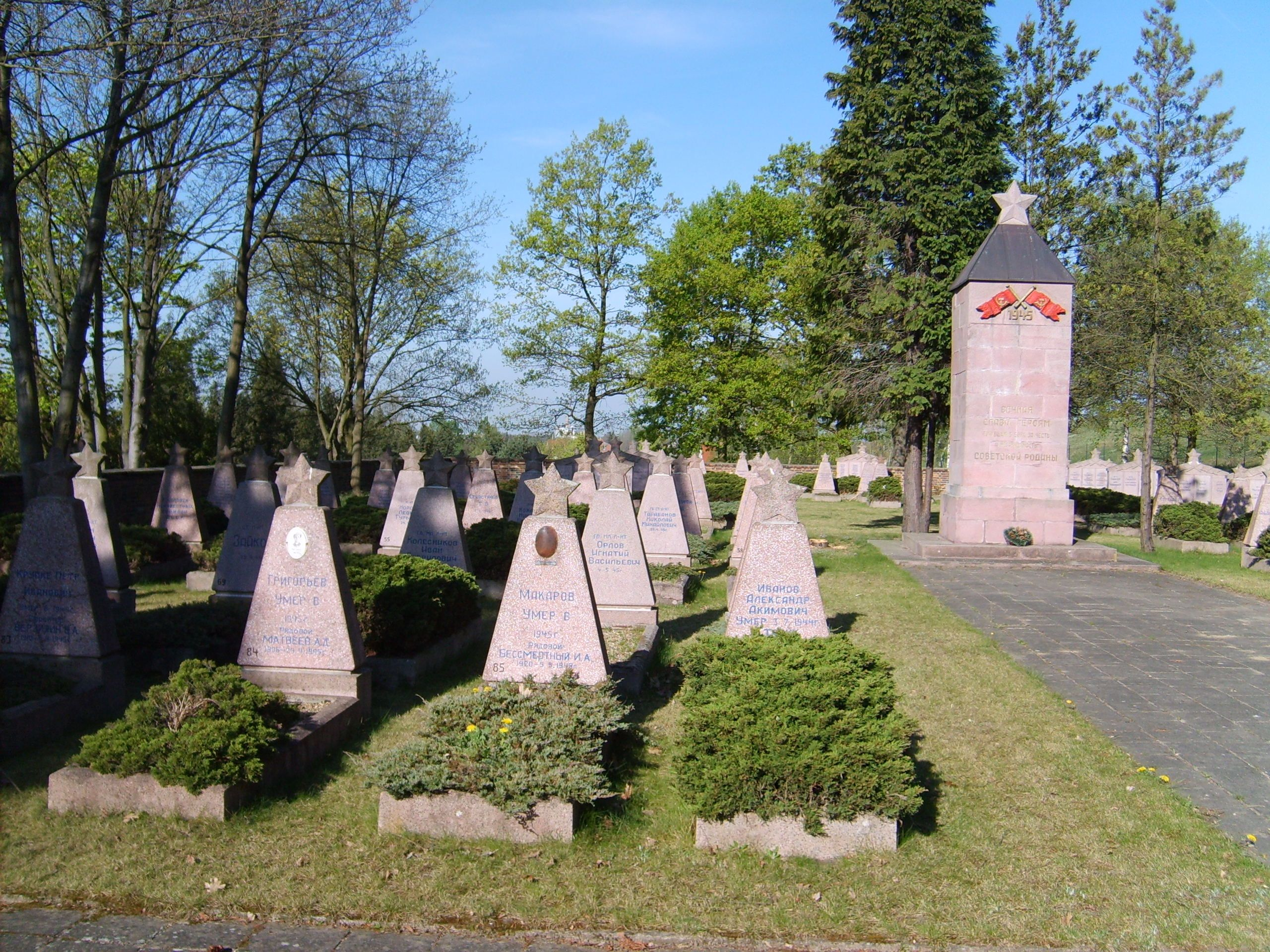
War memorial

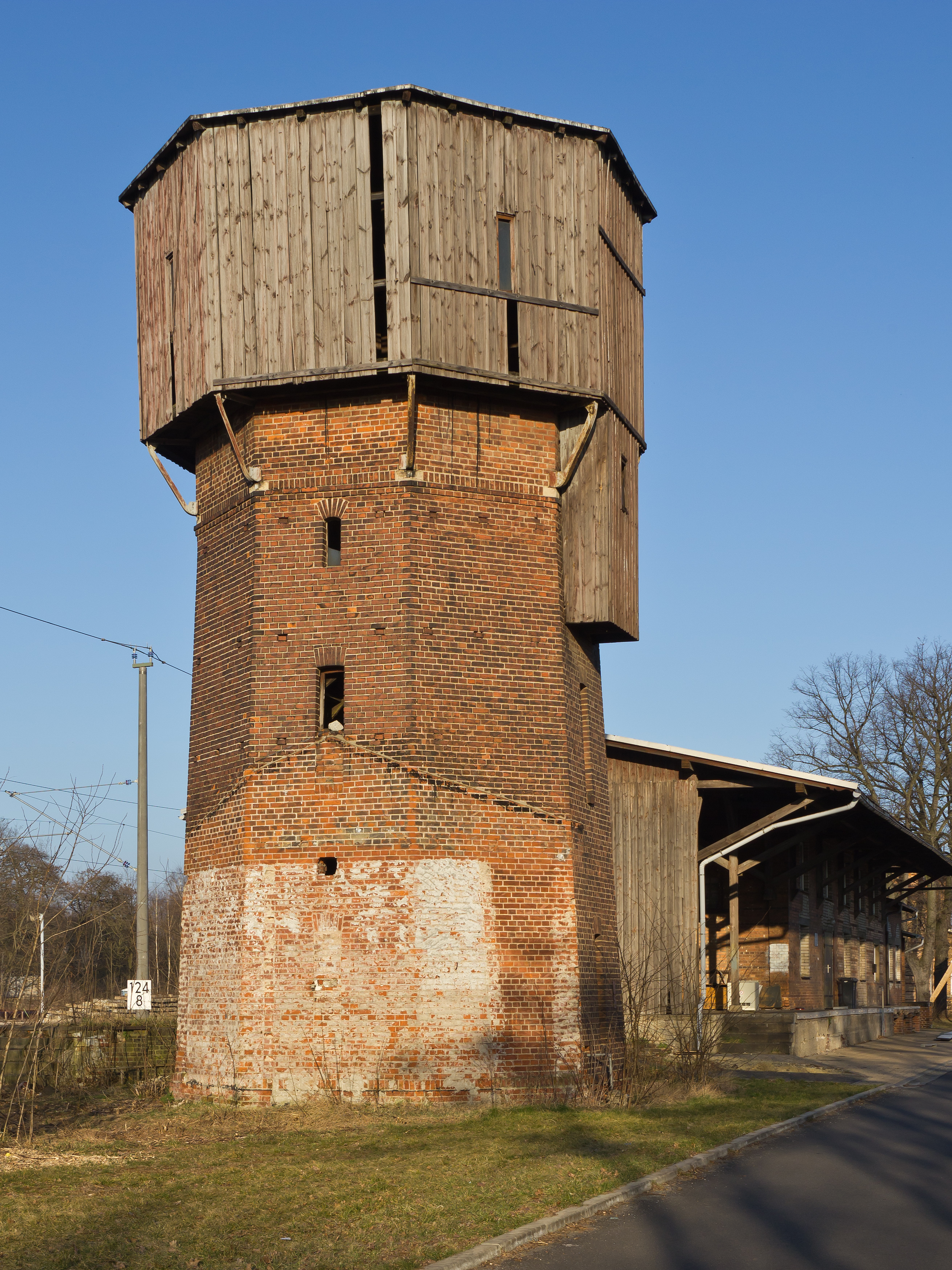
Water tower

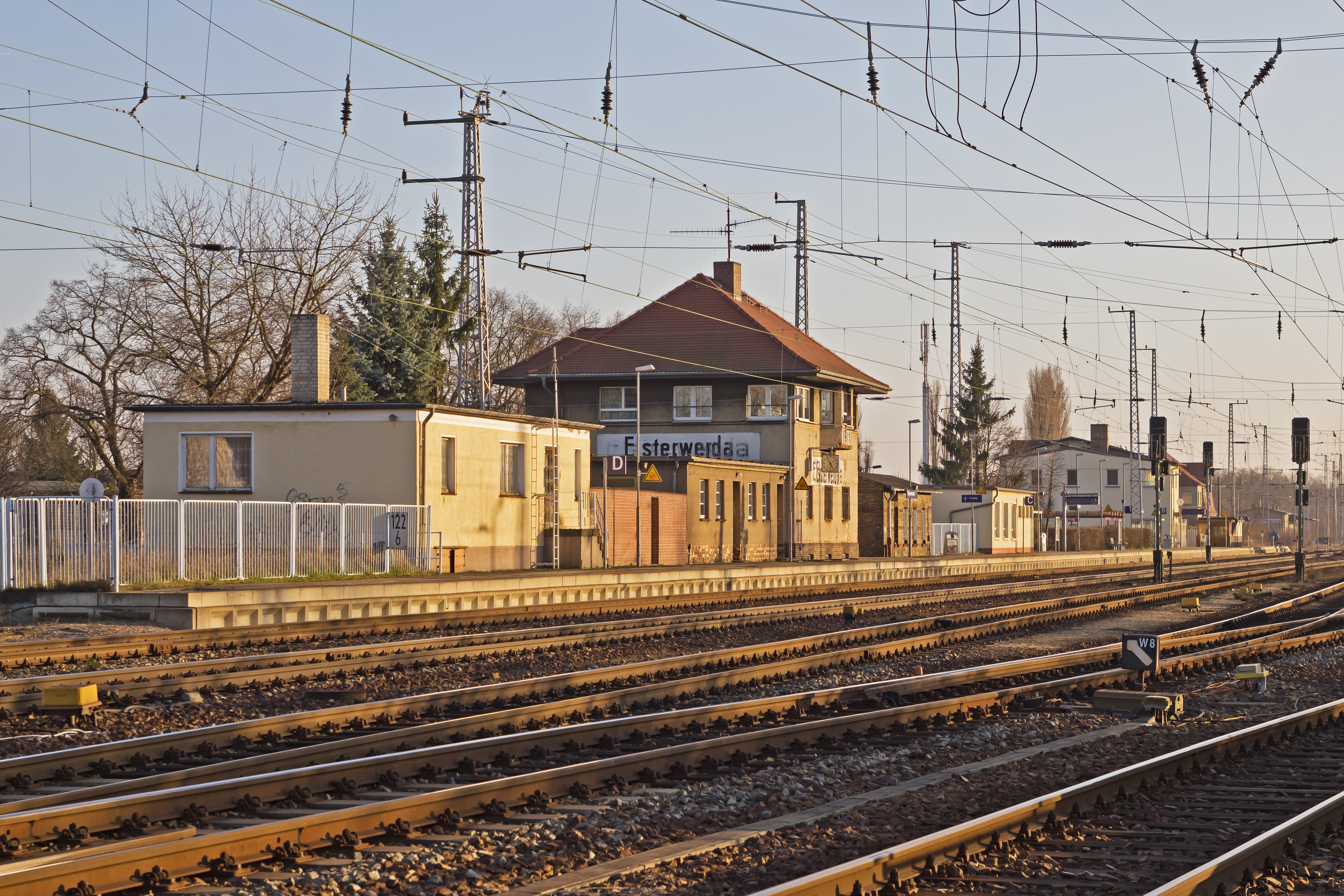
Railway station

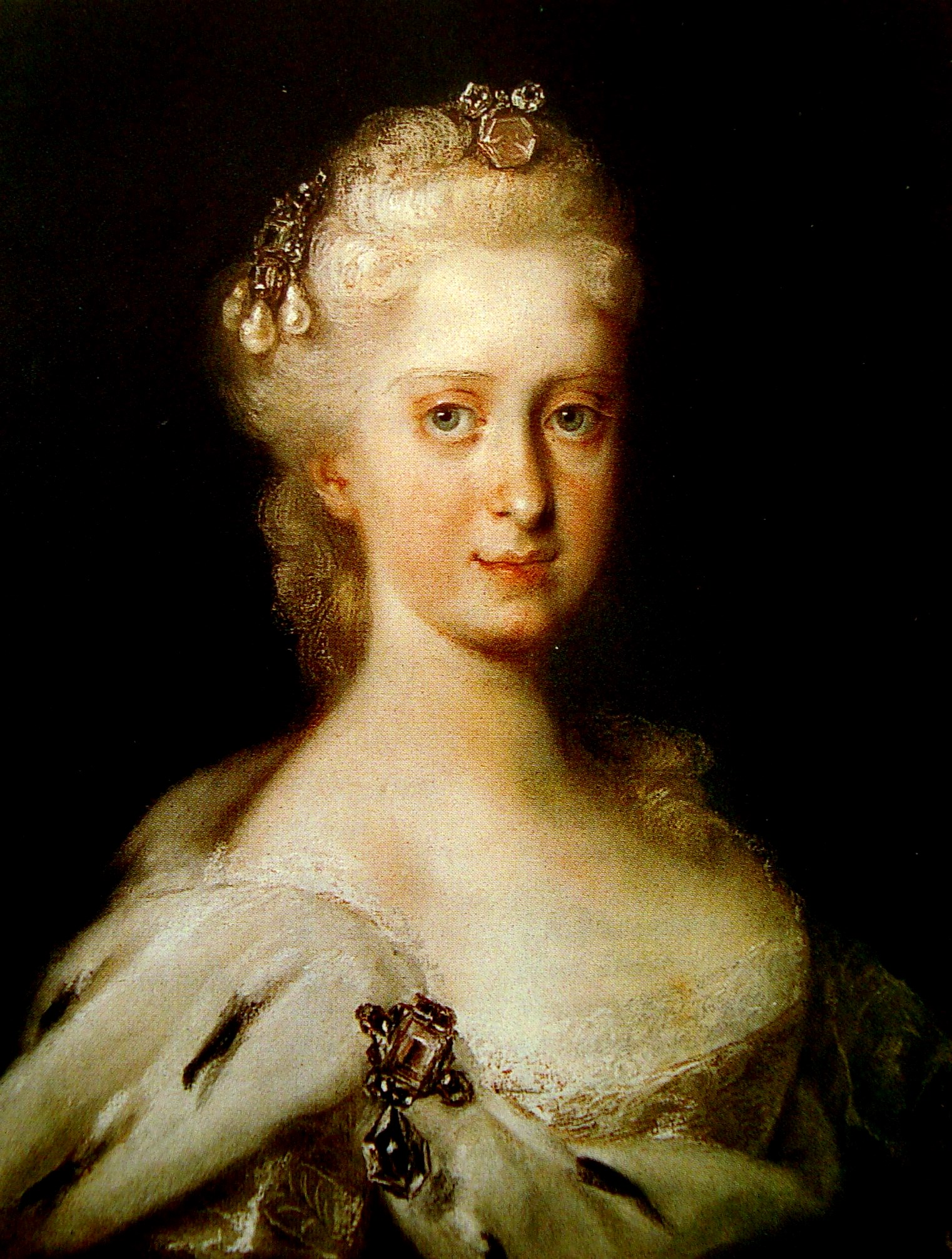
Maria Josepha of Austria, Queen of Poland

== Notable people ==
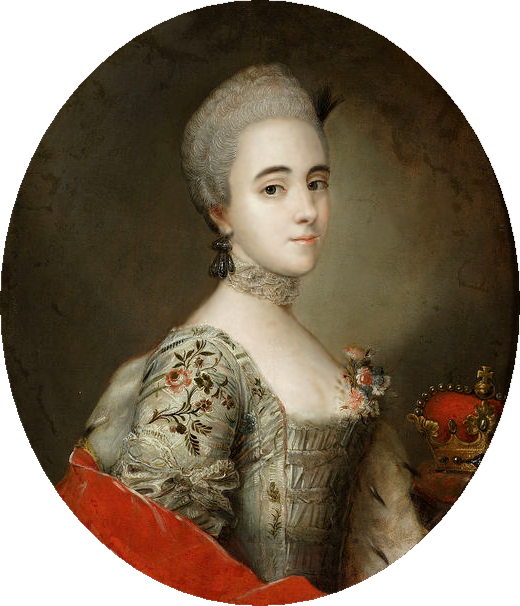
Franciszka Korwin-Krasińska by Krafft the Elder

- Maria Josepha of Austria (1699–1757), Austrian princess and Queen of Poland
- Hartmut Buschbacher (born 1958), international rowing coach
- Charles of Saxony, Duke of Courland (1733–1796), Saxon prince
- Franciszka Krasińska (1742–1796), Polish noblewoman and morganatic wife of the above
- Johann Gottlob Theaenus Schneider (1750–1822), classicist and naturalist, spent his childhood in Elsterwerda
- Johannes Gillhoff (1861–1930), teacher and author
- Erich Straube (1887–1971), officer in WW I and WW II
- Richard Markert (1891–1957), senate president and mayor of Bremen
- Bernd Martin (born 1940), historian, grew up in Elsterwerda
- Siegbert Horn (1950–2016), canoeist, Olympic and World Champion
- Ralf Minge (born 1960), football player and coach

== See also ==
- Elsterwerda-Grödel raft canal
- Holzhof Elsterwerda
