= Thomas Kirste =

German politician (born 1977)

Member of the Landtag of Saxony
- Incumbent
- Assumed office 1 October 2019
- Preceded by: Daniela Kuge
- Constituency: Meißen 3

Personal details
- Born: 1977 (age 48–49) Meißen
- Party: Alternative for Germany (since 2015)

Thomas Kirste (born 1977 in Meissen) is a German politician serving as a member of the Landtag of Saxony since 2019. In the 2020 local elections, he was a candidate for Landrat of Meissen.
