= Albrechtsburg =

Castle in Saxony, Germany

Coordinates: 51°09′58″N 13°28′15″E

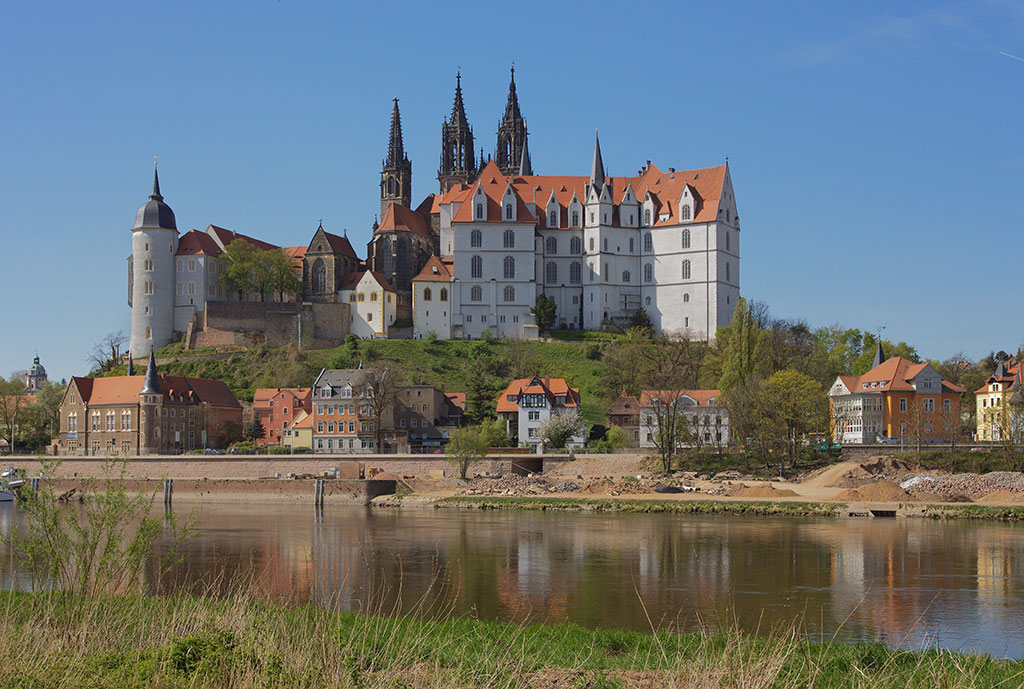
Albrechtsburg and Meissen Cathedral on the Elbe river

The Albrechtsburg is a Late Gothic castle erected from 1471 till about 1495. It is located in the town centre of Meissen in the German state of Saxony. It is situated on a hill above the river Elbe, adjacent to the Meissen Cathedral.

== History ==
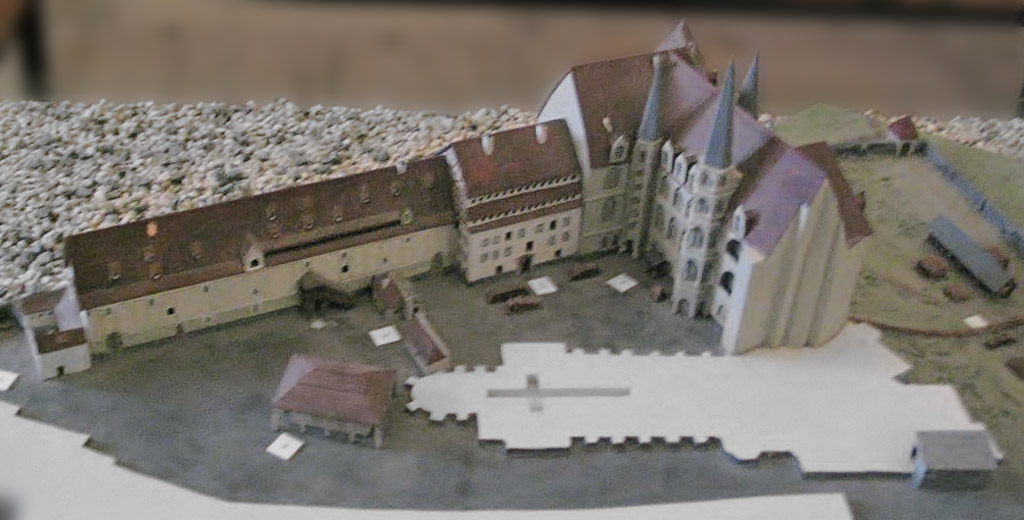
Earlier model of the castle

In 929 King Henry I of Germany subdued the Slavic Glomacze tribe at the Siege of Gana and built a fortress within their settlement area, situated on a rock high above the Elbe river. This castle, called Misnia after a nearby creek, became the nucleus of the town and from 965 the residence of the Margraves of Meissen, who in 1423 acquired the Electorate of Saxony.

In 1423 Frederick I was appointed Elector of Saxony. His grandsons, Ernst and Albrecht, ruled over Saxony and Thuringia together from 1464 to 1485 and commissioned the master builder Arnold von Westfalen to build the first German palace on the site of the old margravial castle in 1471.

Albrechtsburg Castle never actually became a centre of Wettin's court. While construction was still in progress, the builders agreed in 1485 on a division of their territory. The joint government of the two brothers was abolished and the land was divided into two parts. Albrecht received essentially the Margraviate of Meissen with the newly built castle and the later Thuringian district, his brother Ernst the remaining Thuringian areas and the Duchy of Saxony with Wittenberg, to which the electorate was bound.. Between 1495 and 1500, construction work was halted during the interior finishing work in the upper northern parts. It was not until 1521 that the son of Duke Albrecht, Duke Georg (1500-1539), these areas were completed by Jakob Heilmann. From this period are the loop ribbed vault in the style of Benedikt Ried, who worked in Prague, on the first floor of the north-eastern building and a fireplace in the room above. At that time the sculptor Christoph Walther I was also commissioned to create figural reliefs for the balustrades of the Great Staircase Tower, the frames of which show typical early Renaissance forms.

The castle was christened "Albrechtsburg" in 1676 after one of its first lords. But it was Albrecht's son, Georg the Bearded, who first took possession of Albrechtsburg Castle as his residence. During the Thirty Years' War the castle was badly damaged. Since then it has stood empty.

It was not until the beginning of the 18th century that Albrechtsburg Castle received more attention again, thanks to Augustus II the Strong, when he had the Meissen porcelain manufactory set up in the castle in 1710. Two years earlier Johann Friedrich Böttger and Ehrenfried Walther von Tschirnhaus had invented European porcelain. At first, Dresden was intended to be the manufactory, but Augustus the Strong chose the empty castle, isolated because of its location, because nowhere else would the secret of porcelain production have been so certain. On 6 June 1710, the porcelain manufactory began operations in the former princely residence, which was to make the "white gold" world-famous.

In the middle of the 19th century, the manufactory was moved to the newly built factory building and the castle stood empty again. Between 1864 and 1870, the old factory buildings were removed and the castle was rebuilt architecturally. The missing furniture was replaced by elaborate paintings on the late Gothic walls. The later well-known artist Alexander Linnemann from Frankfurt was also active in this process, e.g. in designing the new doors. At the end of the 19th century Albrechtsburg Castle was also made accessible to the public and still delights many visitors from home and abroad.

== Architectural structure ==
The former electoral castle rises above a hook-shaped ground plan on a rocky plateau steeply sloping towards the Elbe north of Meissen Cathedral. All storeys are vaulted, a great peculiarity of German palace construction, which required an immense financial and design effort. The high substructures of the core building are followed by a low ground floor and two main floors open with unusually large so-called curtain arch windows. Another storey, which was also used by the nobility, is already located within the roof zone and is lit through the windows of the Lucerne row.

The tower-like character of Meissen Castle, which is still so striking from all sides, is probably a well-calculated image of political significance. Albrechtsburg Castle was not only to become a residential palace that was particularly comfortable to live in, but also an unmistakable sign of the increasingly consolidating territorial rule of the Wettins, which was gaining in imperial, administrative and economic importance. For this purpose Arnold von Westfalen was probably expected to formulate a new architectural language.

While the architectural decoration belongs to the Late Gothic period, the structure of the building forms already leads to the culture of the European Renaissance. The ground plan of Albrechtsburg Castle, which was already proportioned like a tower, was divided into individual tower figures; all the strips of the façade tend to be upright rectangular in format; in the effect of light and shade, the core building presents itself like a crystal with a multiply folded surface. Apart from the Staircase tower on the courtyard side, however, only one building, arranged in the central zone on the Elbe side, develops into a real tower; all other buildings are bound together again by the mighty roof. In the roof zone, however, the lucarnes, high-rectangular roof dormers resting on the eaves line, form a wreath of tower figures surrounding the building. The lucarne in its typical design as a window bay window originates from France, but it was only in isolated cases (e.g. in the castles of Baugé and Le Rivau) that it was used in such a systematic and consistent manner around 1470.

Another momentous adaptation of French building culture in Meissen was the use of the lofty staircase tower, as it had been formulated as a type in 1365 with the - later demolished - Great Spiral Staircase in the courtyard of the Louvre. The large main staircase to the south, which provides access to the upper floors used for stately purposes, is a masterpiece of stonemasonry with intricately curved steps winding up around an open eye in the centre. Its windows were originally open and allowed a variety of views between those walking on the stairs and spectators in the courtyard. However, the overall shape of the gallery in front of the Meissen staircase tower and the neighbouring section of the façade has no direct French model. A smaller stair tower is also located on the courtyard façade in the corner between the north and east wings.

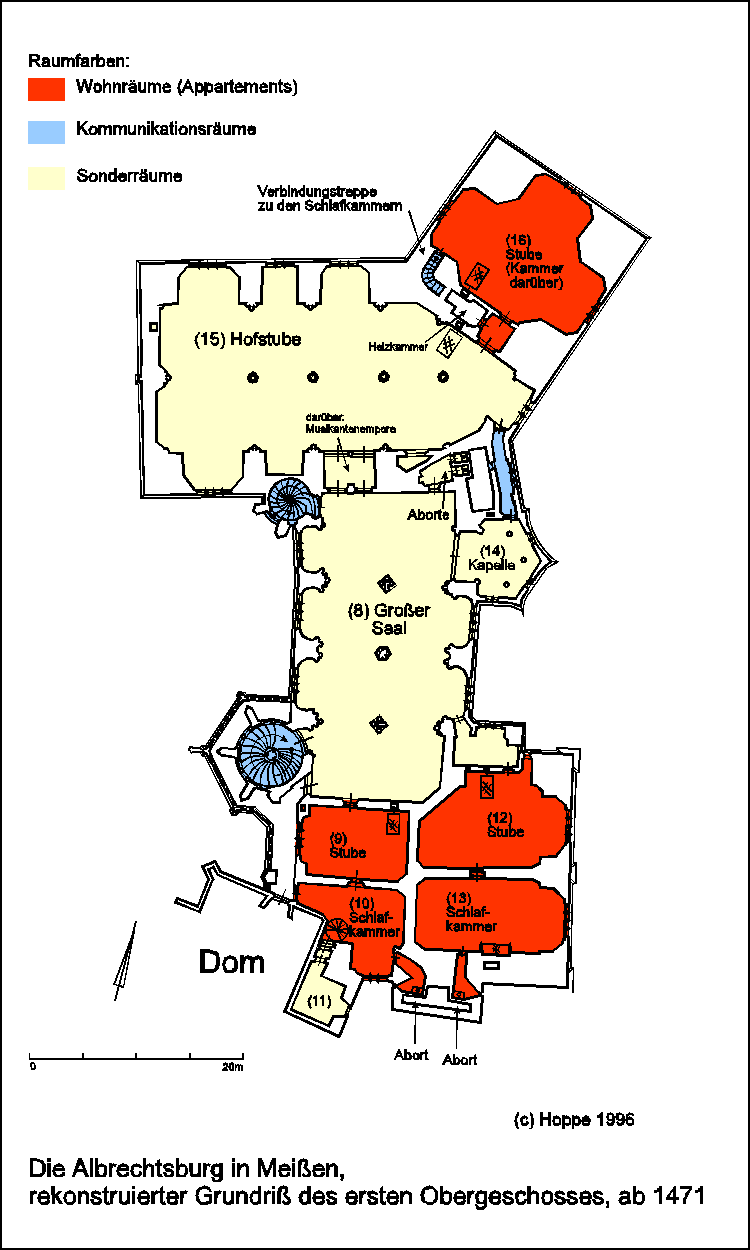
Reconstruction of the room functions of the first floor around 1500

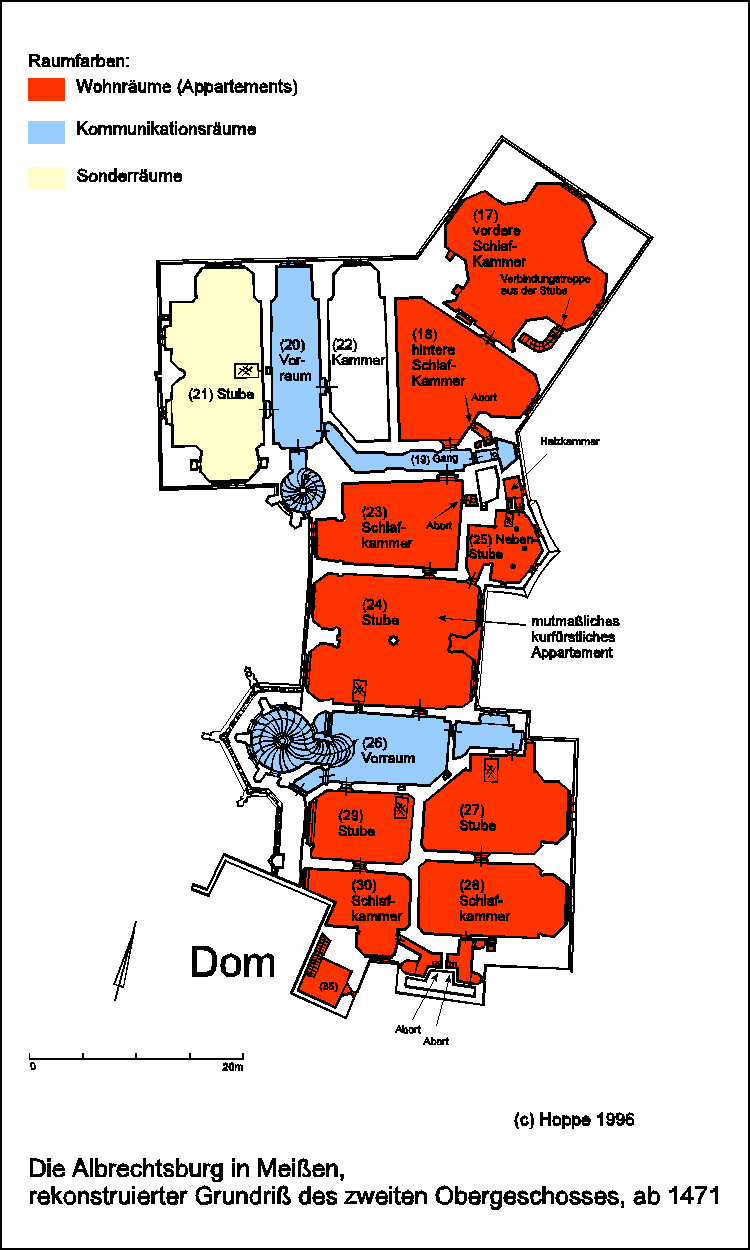
Reconstruction of the room functions of the second floor around 1500

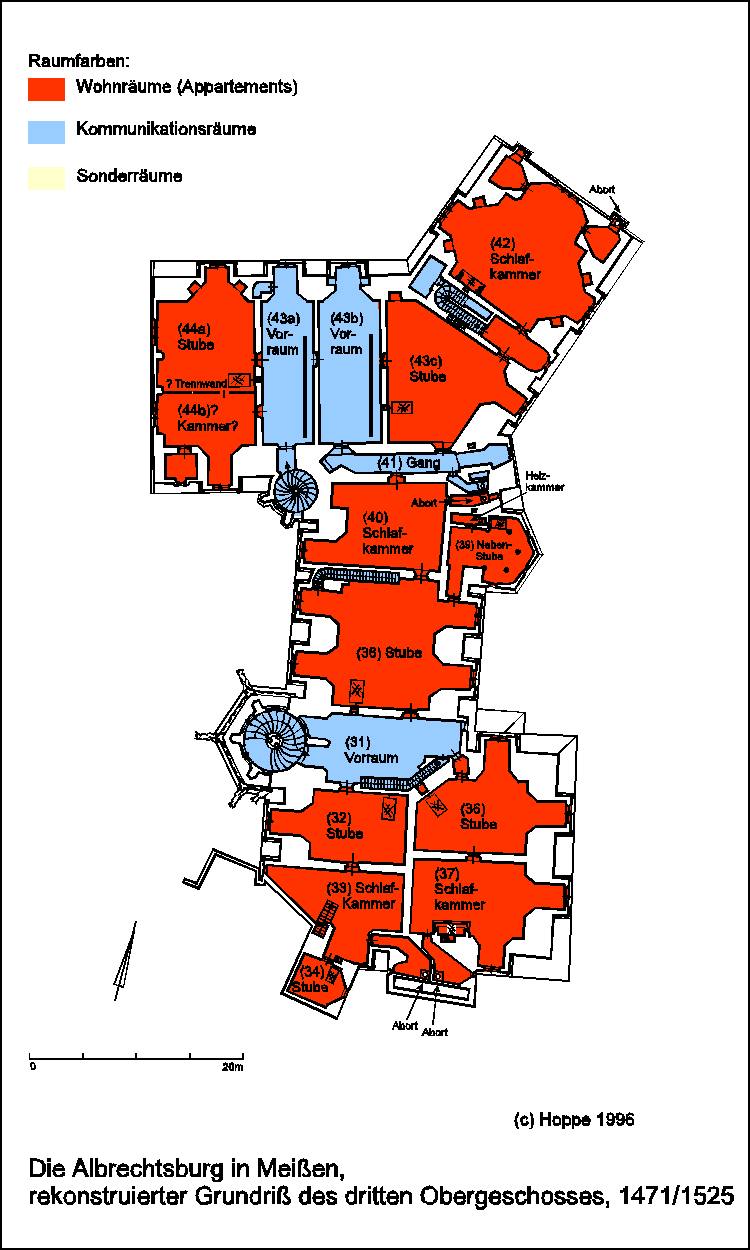
Reconstruction of the room functions of the third floor (attic) around 1500

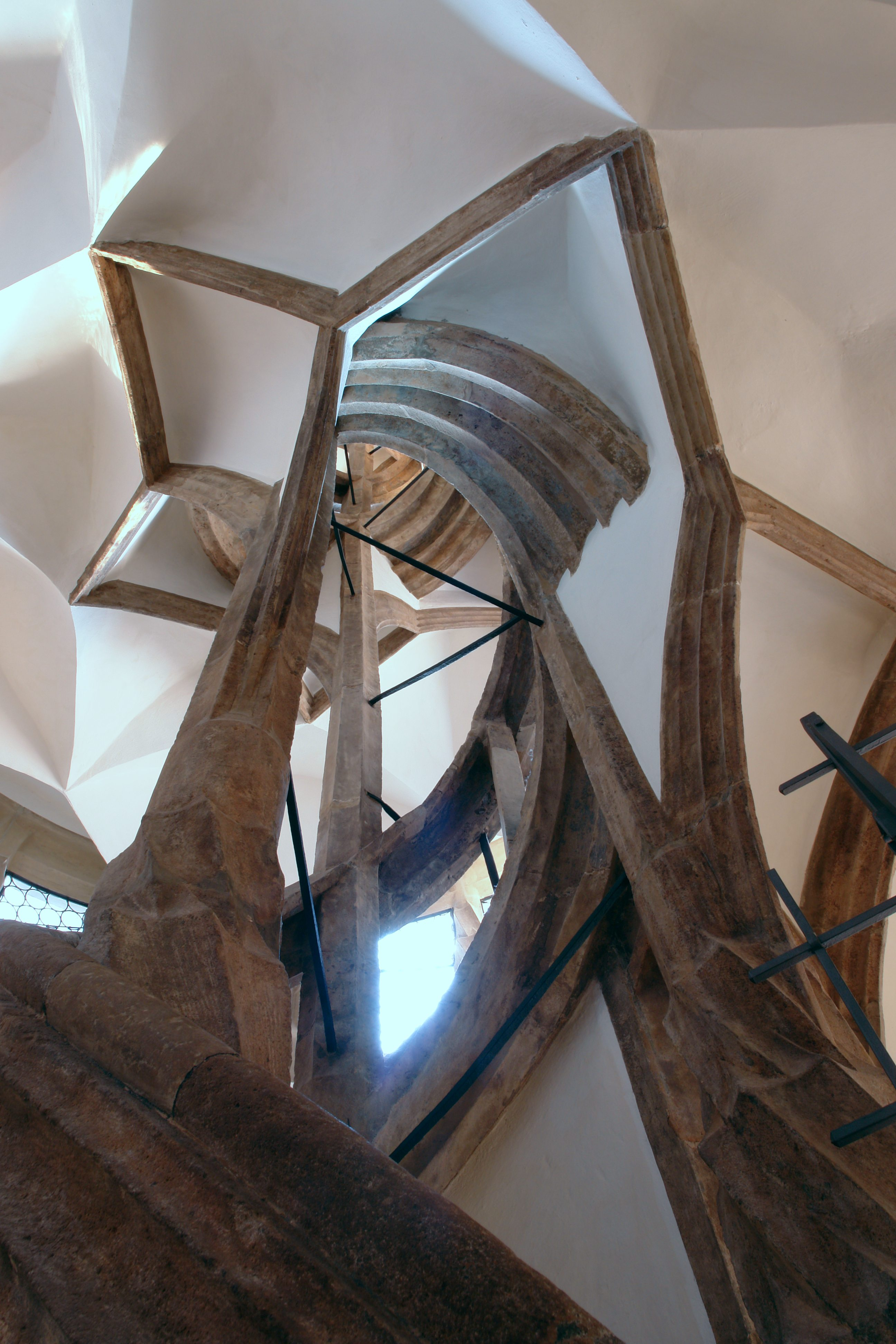
Main staircase tower

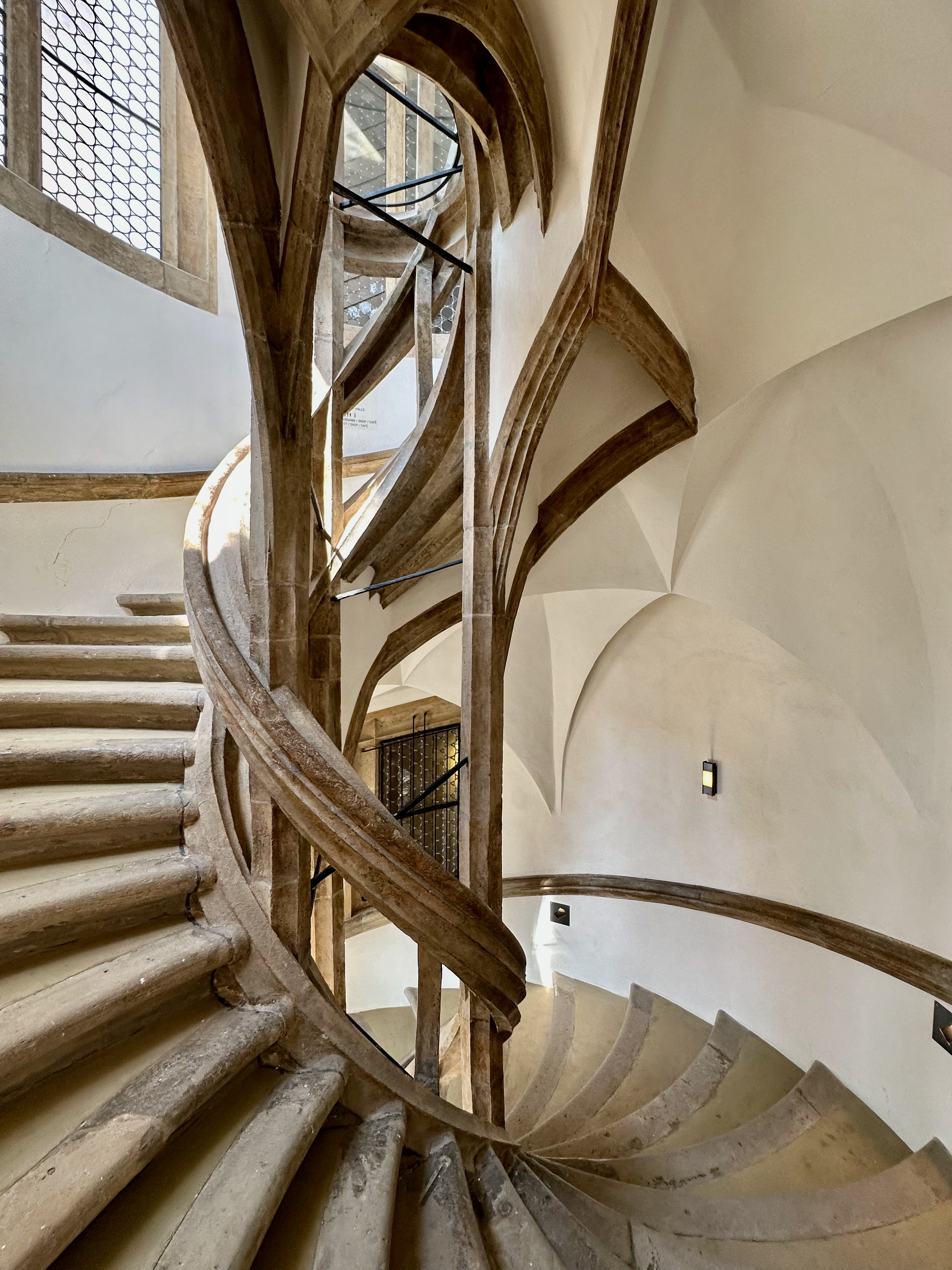
Head on view of spiral staircase in Albrechtsburg

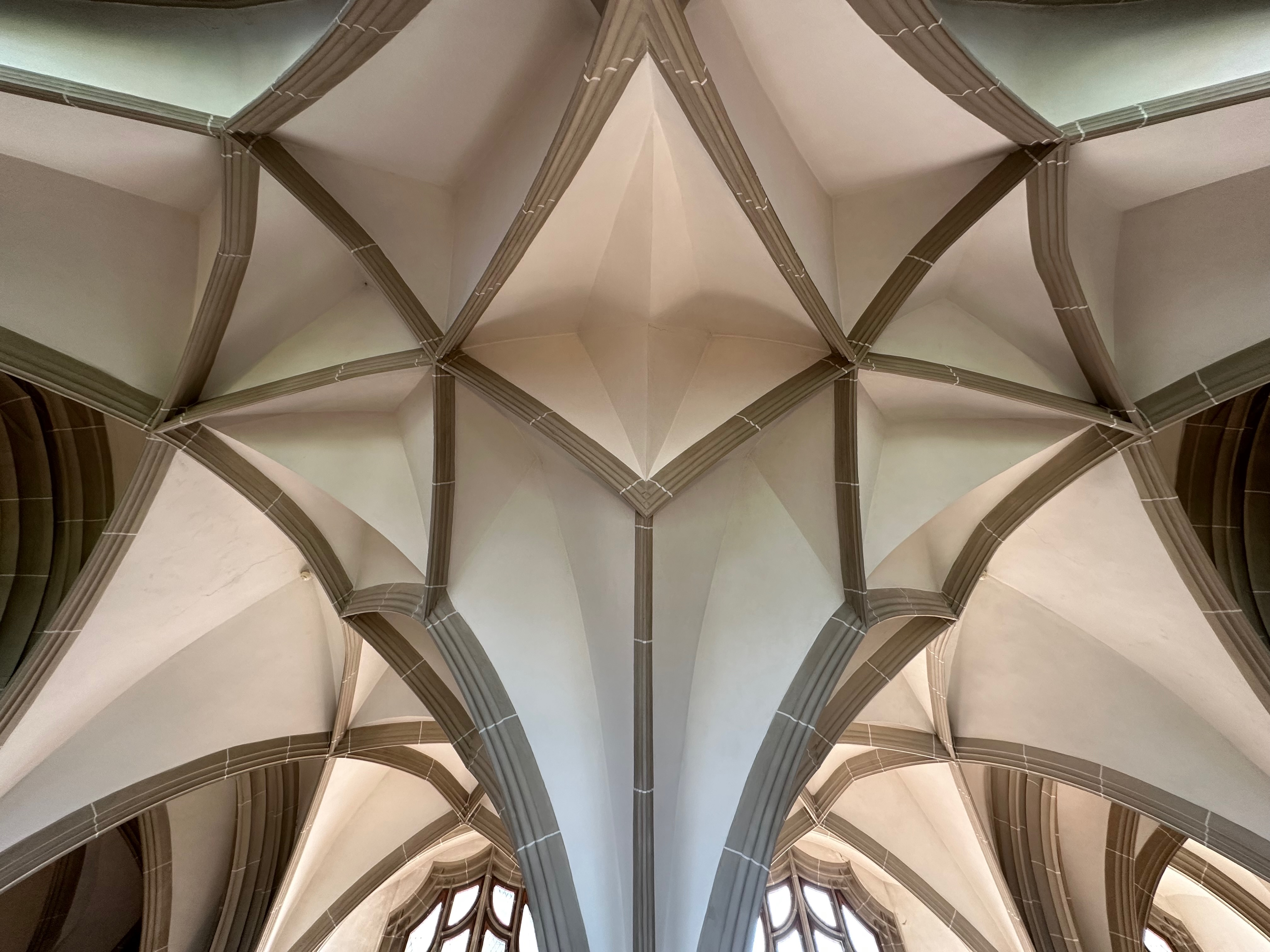
Detail of vaulting in Great Hall

== Interior design ==
Inside Albrechtsburg Castle the master builder had to implement a highly complex spatial programme.

Large areas of the first floor are taken up by two large halls. Both are generously windowed on several sides, have two naves and are vaulted like the other rooms on the floor. The centrally located hall to which the main entrance of the Great Staircase Tower leads was the large dancing hall of the palace, which was used occasionally. It was not heatable and in everyday life it fulfilled the function of a communication area between the surrounding staircases and rooms, including a chapel.

In contrast, the North Hall was the banqueting hall (Hofstube), heated by a large tiled stove formerly placed at the north-east corner, in which the entire male court household, including the princes, was to meet twice a day for main meals. Between the two rooms there is a musician's gallery above the connecting door, which could serve both rooms as required.

Around these two large rooms are grouped three independent apartments as living and office areas, each consisting of an oven-heated parlour as the main room and one or more subordinate chambers as sleeping and storage rooms. The most elaborate architectural design is that of the flat adjoining the banqueting hall (Hofstube) in the north-east. Its parlour and the unheated bed chamber above it, which can be reached directly via a wall staircase, take up the building, which is turned by 45 degrees from the main building line and rises like a tower with three free-standing sides above the Elbe valley. Above the elaborate and costly substructures of the basement floors, the architect has created rooms here that allow a panoramic view to three sides.

The architecturally staged panoramic view itself was already valued in palace construction throughout Europe at that time. However, the multi-view "fan view" in Meissen differs fundamentally from the view guides that were common in France or Italy at that time, where the optical reference to the surroundings was almost always formulated in the form of a directed uniform image. In the following period, such spatial formations were to become a characteristic feature of elaborate Central European palace construction in Wittenberg, Torgau, Neuburg a. d. Donau or Heidelberg, among others. The large northeast apartment was probably originally intended for high-ranking guests, but in the course of the 16th century the princes retreated there to a separate table during the main meals. At the time of construction, separation from the total meal was only customary for the female members of the court, the so-called Frauenzimmer. The master builder also designed a room with three window fronts for them, but on the first floor, where this group of people was somewhat separated from the courtly activities.

On the second floor, in addition to the Frauenzimmertafelstube and two other smaller apartments on the south side, the three-roomed apartment of the Elector was furnished as a centre between the Elbe and courtyard front. In addition to the parlour with windows on two sides as the main reception room and the more intimate bedroom on the other side, the elector was to have a small adjoining room on the valley side. The typological models for such a retreat room are the "estudes" or "cabinets" in French castles, or the studioli propagated by Italian humanists. A famous Italian example, almost contemporaneous, was installed between 1472 and 1476 in the Ducal Palace of Urbino. The small room of the Elector's apartment in Meissen is architecturally designed to be a real showpiece, offering multiple views across the Elbe valley in various directions. In its position away from the hustle and bustle of the palace courtyard, it corresponds exactly to the advice of the influential Renaissance theorist Leon Battista Alberti (1404-1472) for the construction of such rooms.

The ground plan of the second floor is repeated in essential aspects on the third floor above in the Lucerne zone. Here one can assume that the Electrice's flat with an internal staircase to the rooms of her entourage is located one floor higher in the roof.

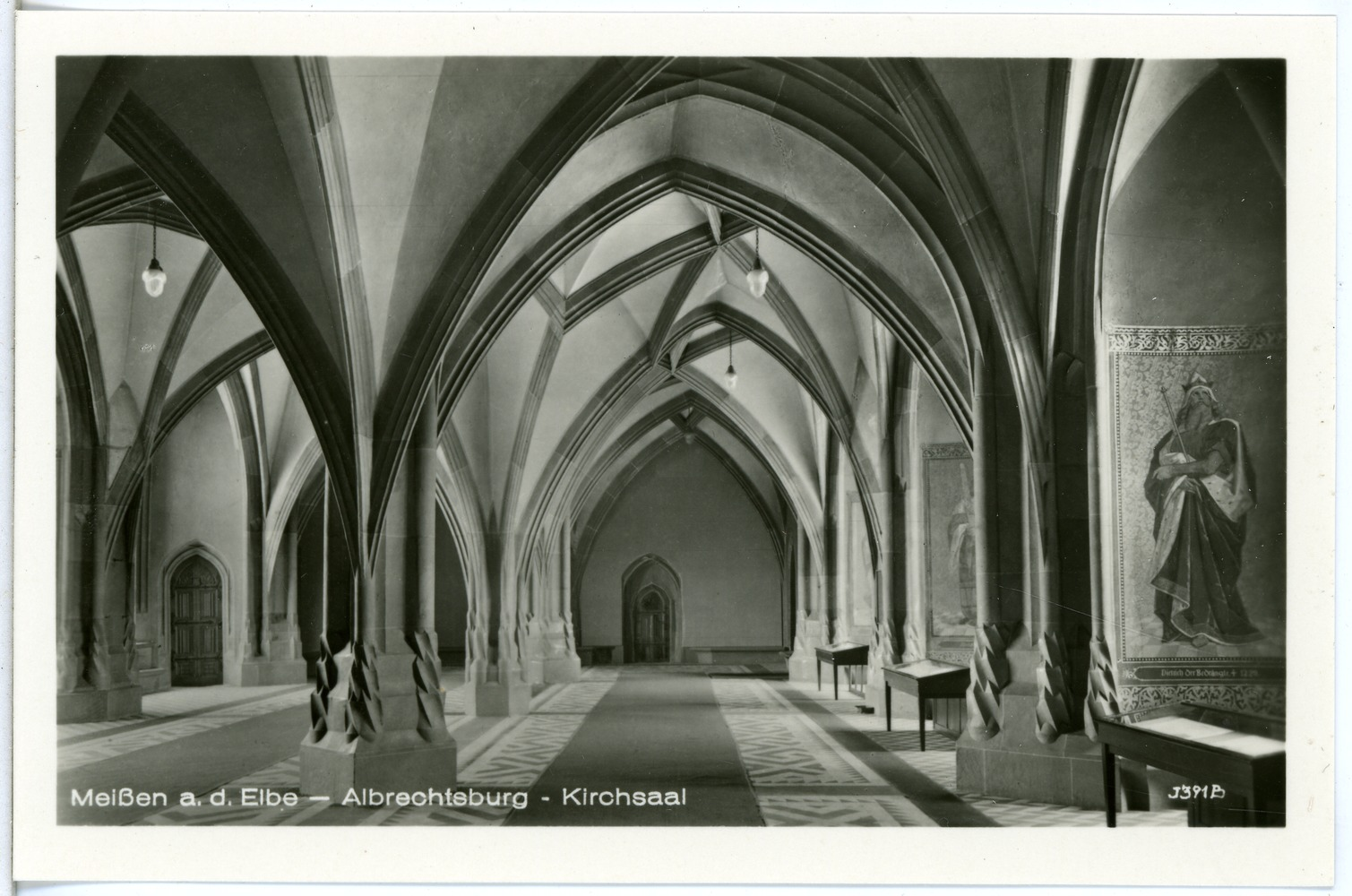
The Great Hall on the first floor as a festival and dance hall

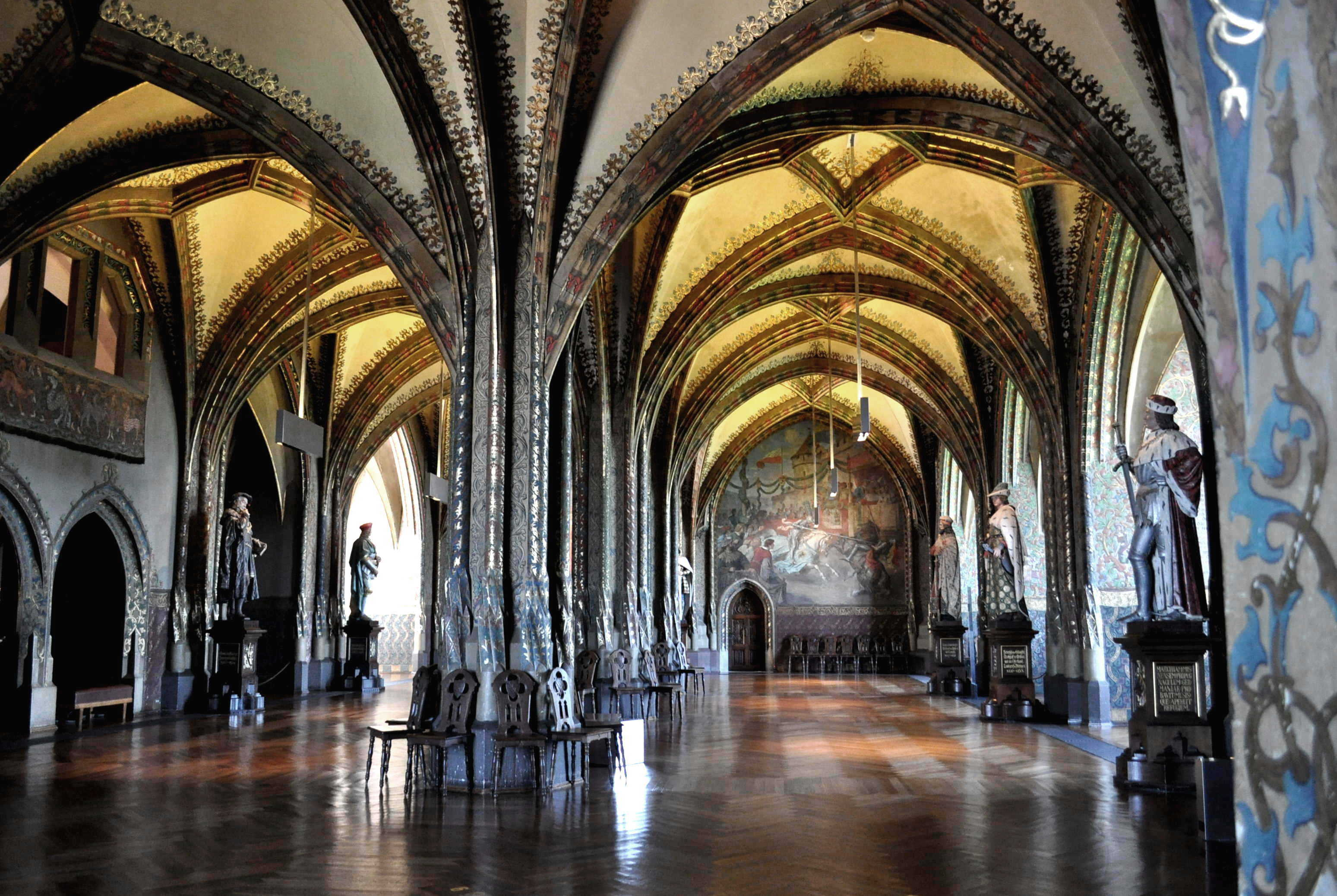
"Große Hofstube" as the main dining room of the Court Society

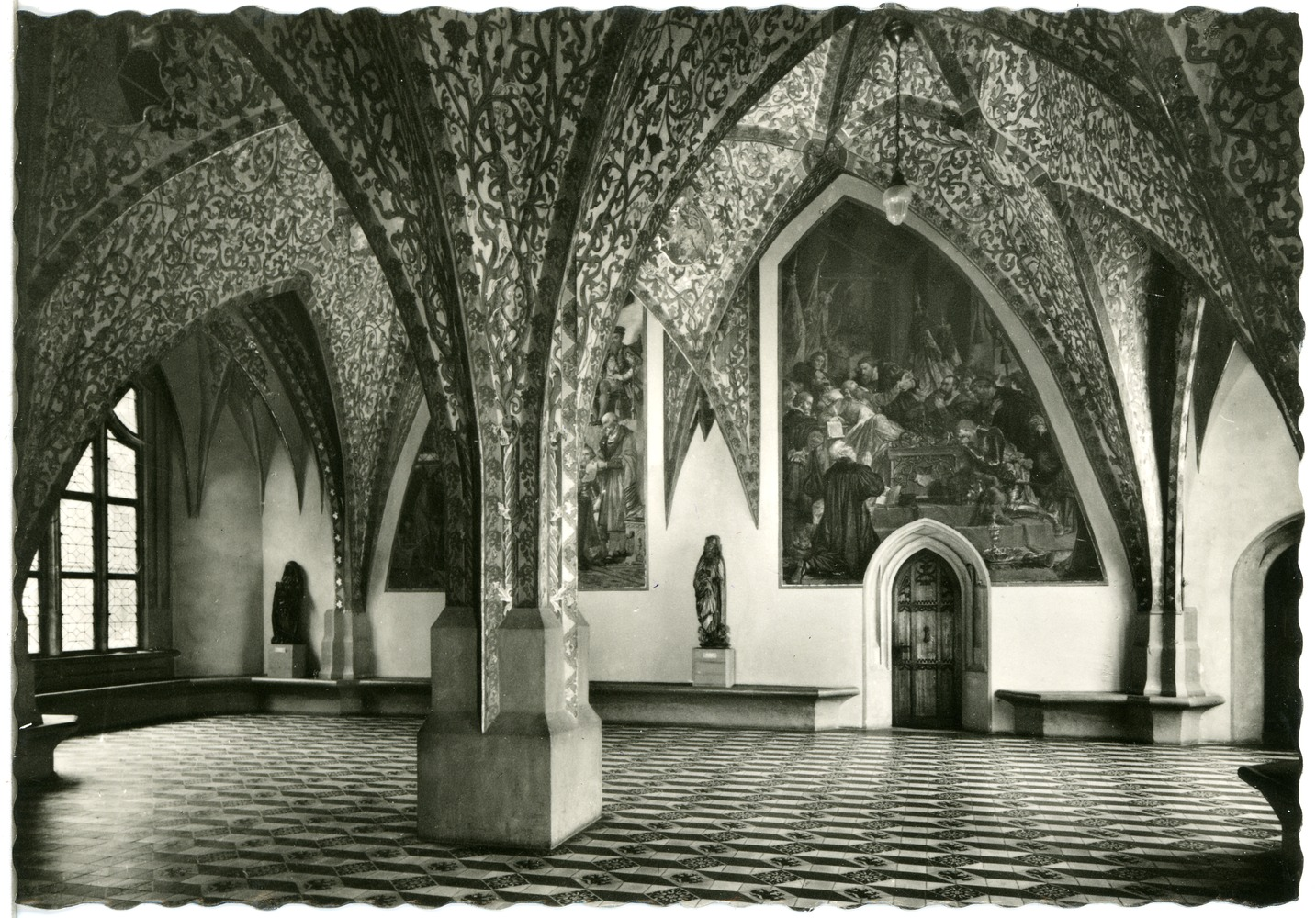
The former electoral presence room (Stube) on the second floor

== Artistic principles ==
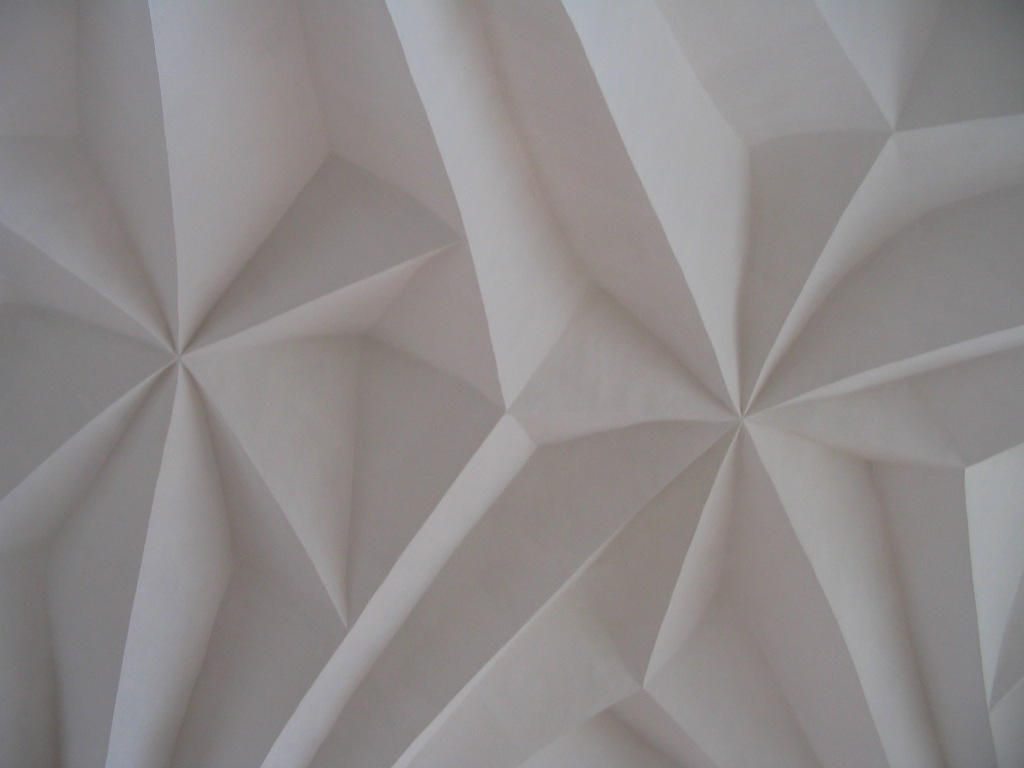
Typical cellular vault (Zellengewölbe), invented by Arnold von Westfalen

The extraordinarily complex construction task of Albrechtsburg Castle required the establishment and constant operation of a large workshop, which under Master Arnold and his closest students became a centre of architectural development and education with supra-regional charisma, as was previously typical only of the large church building lodges. The cellular vaulting developed in Albrechtsburg Castle and the curtain-like upper finishes of the main windows were copied over a wide area; in some cases, the forms initially created for the profane area were subsequently even introduced into sacred buildings.

Here, a reversal of the traditional artistic gradient is indicated, as was to become increasingly evident in the course of the 16th century. In 1471 Arnold von Westfalen was also given the newly created office of a sovereign master builder, so that he, as a former representative of the modern profession of the court artist, was able to assert his influence under the roof of the early modern territorial state that was forming.

== General and cited references ==
- Bachrach, David (1 August 2013). "Henry I of Germany's 929 Military Campaign in Archaeological Perspective". Early Medieval Europe. 21 (3). Oxford: Wiley Blackwell: 307–337. doi:10.1111/emed.12020.
- Stefan Bürger (2011): MeisterWerk. Von fürstlichen Ideen, faszinierenden Formen und flinken Händen. Katalog zur Dauerausstellung auf der Albrechtsburg Meissen. Dresden.
- Hans-Joachim Mrusek (ed.) (1972): Die Albrechtsburg zu Meißen. Leipzig.
