= Backofen =

Backofen means oven in German-language. It is also a German surname. Notable people with the surname include:

- Eva Backofen (born 1949), German graphic artist and sculptor
- Hans Backoffen (?–1519), or Backofen, German sculptor
- Johann Georg Heinrich Backofen (1768–1830?), German clarinetist and composer
- Jonas Backofen (born 2001), Austrian curler
