= Nordsachsen (electoral district) =

Federal electoral district of Germany

150 Nordsachsen
- Electoral district for the Bundestag
- Nordsachsen in 2025
- State: Saxony
- Population: 197,700 (2019)
- Electorate: 161,279 (2021)
- Major settlements: Delitzsch; Torgau; Schkeuditz
- Area: 2,028.6 km^{2}

Current electoral district
- Created: 1990
- Party: AfD
- Member: René Bochmann
- Elected: 2021, 2025

Nordsachsen (English: North Saxony) is an electoral constituency (German: Wahlkreis) represented in the Bundestag. It elects one member via first-past-the-post voting. Under the current constituency numbering system, it is designated as constituency 150. It is located in northern Saxony, comprising the district of Nordsachsen.

Nordsachsen was created for the inaugural 1990 federal election after German reunification. Since 2021, it has been represented by René Bochmann of Alternative for Germany (AfD).

== Geography ==
Nordsachsen is located in northern Saxony. As of the 2021 federal election, it is coterminous with the district of Nordsachsen.

== History ==
Nordsachsen was created after German reunification in 1990, then known as Delitzsch – Eilenburg – Torgau – Wurzen. In the 2002 and 2005 elections, it was named Delitzsch – Torgau-Oschatz – Riesa. It acquired its current name in the 2009 election. In the 1990 through 1998 elections, it was constituency 308 in the numbering system. From 2002 through 2009, it was number 152. In the 2013 through 2021 elections, it was number 151. From the 2025 election, it has been number 150.

Originally, the constituency comprised the districts of Delitzsch, Eilenburg, Torgau, and Wurzen. In the 2002 and 2005 elections, it comprised the districts of Delitzsch and Torgau-Oschatz as well as the municipalities of Hirschstein, Riesa, Stauchitz, Strehla, and Zeithain from the Riesa-Großenhain district. It acquired its current borders in the 2009 election.

Election	No.	Name	Borders
1990	308	Delitzsch – Eilenburg – Torgau – Wurzen	Delitzsch district; Eilenburg district; Torgau district; Wurzen district
1994	308	Delitzsch – Eilenburg – Torgau – Wurzen	Delitzsch district; Eilenburg district; Torgau district; Wurzen district
1998	308	Delitzsch – Eilenburg – Torgau – Wurzen	Delitzsch district; Eilenburg district; Torgau district; Wurzen district
2002	152	Delitzsch – Torgau-Oschatz – Riesa	Delitzsch district; Torgau-Oschatz district; Riesa-Großenhain district (only Hirschstein, Riesa, Stauchitz, Strehla, and Zeithain municipalities)
2005	152	Delitzsch – Torgau-Oschatz – Riesa	Delitzsch district; Torgau-Oschatz district; Riesa-Großenhain district (only Hirschstein, Riesa, Stauchitz, Strehla, and Zeithain municipalities)
2009	152	Nordsachsen	Nordsachsen district
2013	151	Nordsachsen	Nordsachsen district
2017	151	Nordsachsen	Nordsachsen district
2021	151	Nordsachsen	Nordsachsen district
2025	150	Nordsachsen	Nordsachsen district

== Members ==
The constituency was first represented by Angelika Pfeiffer of the Christian Democratic Union (CDU) from 1990 to 1998. It was won by Richard Schuhmann of the Social Democratic Party (SPD) in 1998 and served until 2002, when it was won Manfred Kolbe of the CDU. Marian Wendt was elected in 2013 and re-elected in 2017. René Bochmann won the constituency for the AfD in 2021.

Election	Member	Party	%
1990	Angelika Pfeiffer	CDU	48.2
1994	Angelika Pfeiffer	CDU	49.3
1998	Richard Schuhmann	SPD	35.2
2002	Manfred Kolbe	CDU	38.7
2005	Manfred Kolbe	CDU	36.5
2009	Manfred Kolbe	CDU	40.9
2013	Marian Wendt	CDU	45.6
2017	Marian Wendt	CDU	32.8
2021	René Bochmann	AfD	27.8
2025	René Bochmann	AfD	43.8

== Election results ==
=== 2025 election ===
Federal election (2025): Nordsachsen
Notes:	Blue background denotes the winner of the electorate vote. Pink background denotes a candidate elected from their party list. Yellow background denotes an electorate win by a list member, or other incumbent. A ✓ or ✗ denotes status of any incumbent, win or lose respectively.						
Party	Candidate	Votes	%	±%	Party votes	%	±%
AfD	✓ René Bochmann	55,022	43.8	▲16.0	53,909	42.8	▲15.5
CDU	Christiane Schenderlein	31,395	25.0	▲2.1	26,170	20.8	▲1.2
BSW					10,946	8.7	New
SPD	Heiko Wittig	12,555	10.0	▼8.9	10,562	8.4	▼12.6
Left	Peter Neßmann	10,501	8.4	▲0.3	10,081	8.0	▲0.5
FW	Mike Kühne	7,092	5.6	▲1.6	2,754	2.2	▼0.7
Greens	Kai-Uwe Tüchler	3,090	2.5	▼2.5	4,308	3.4	▼1.2
FDP	Laurenz Frenzel	2,684	2.1	▼6.6	4,012	3.2	▼7.4
Tierschutzpartei					1,486	1.2	▼0.8
PARTEI	Alexander Sucker	1,523	1.2	▼0.5	666	0.5	▼0.6
BD	Mike Scharsich	953	0.8	New	350	0.3	New
Volt	Falk Fiebig	907	0.7	New	483	0.4	▲0.2
Pirates					173	0.1	▼0.2
Humanists					104	0.1	0.0
MLPD					52	<0.1	0.0
Informal votes		1,183			849		
Total valid votes		125,722			126,056		
Turnout		126,905	80.1	▲6.2			
AfD hold	Majority	23,627	18.8	▲13.8			

=== 2021 election ===
Federal election (2021): Nordsachsen
Notes:	Blue background denotes the winner of the electorate vote. Pink background denotes a candidate elected from their party list. Yellow background denotes an electorate win by a list member, or other incumbent. A ✓ or ✗ denotes status of any incumbent, win or lose respectively.						
Party	Candidate	Votes	%	±%	Party votes	%	±%
AfD	René Bochmann	32,702	27.8	▲1.0	32,066	27.2	▲0.4
CDU	Christiane Schenderlein	26,883	22.8	▼10.0	23,000	19.5	▼9.9
SPD	Rüdiger Kleinke	22,257	18.9	▲5.0	24,732	21.0	▲8.5
FDP	Martin Richter	10,251	8.7	▲2.1	12,476	10.6	▲2.7
Left	Philipp Rubach	9,446	8.0	▼9.2	8,868	7.5	▼7.2
Greens	Denis Korn	5,883	5.0	▲2.4	5,462	4.6	▲2.0
FW	Chris Daiser	4,707	4.0		3,346	2.8	▲1.7
Tierschutzpartei					2,311	2.0	▲0.5
PARTEI	Karsten Gutjahr	2,069	1.8		1,333	1.1	▲0.4
dieBasis	Doreen Klinger	1,716	1.5		1,363	1.2	
Independent	Sandro Oschkinat	1,112	0.9				
Gesundheitsforschung					598	0.5	
NPD					473	0.4	▼1.1
Pirates					404	0.3	0.0
The III. Path					268	0.2	
ÖDP	Uta Strenger	416	0.4		240	0.2	▲0.1
Independent	Sven Asmus	223	0.2				
Team Todenhöfer					196	0.2	
Volt					170	0.1	
Humanists					137	0.1	
DKP					89	0.1	
Bündnis C					88	0.1	
MLPD					76	0.1	0.0
V-Partei3					61	0.1	▲0.1
Informal votes		1,541			1,449		
Total valid votes		117,665			117,757		
Turnout		119,206	73.9	▲1.8			
AfD gain from CDU	Majority	5,819	5.0				

=== 2017 election ===
Federal election (2017): Nordsachsen
Notes:	Blue background denotes the winner of the electorate vote. Pink background denotes a candidate elected from their party list. Yellow background denotes an electorate win by a list member, or other incumbent. A ✓ or ✗ denotes status of any incumbent, win or lose respectively.						
Party	Candidate	Votes	%	±%	Party votes	%	±%
CDU	✓ Marian Wendt	38,207	32.8	▼12.8	34,321	29.4	▼15.5
AfD	Detlev Spangenberg	31,244	26.8		31,301	26.9	▲20.7
Left	Susanna Karawanskij	20,028	17.2	▼4.6	17,173	14.7	▼5.9
SPD	Rüdiger Kleinke	16,248	14.0	▼6.4	14,519	12.5	▼2.9
FDP	Christoph Waitz	7,641	6.6	▲4.5	9,189	7.9	▲5.2
Greens	Jörg Bornack	3,070	2.6	▼0.5	3,021	2.6	▼0.3
NPD					1,789	1.5	▼2.3
Tierschutzpartei					1,714	1.5	
FW					1,273	1.1	0.0
PARTEI					891	0.8	
Pirates					397	0.3	▼1.6
BGE					340	0.3	
ÖDP					167	0.1	
DiB					155	0.1	
V-Partei³					154	0.1	
MLPD					99	0.1	0.0
BüSo					60	0.1	▼0.1
Informal votes		1,732			1,607		
Total valid votes		116,438			116,563		
Turnout		118,170	72.1	▲5.7			
CDU hold	Majority	6,963	6.0	▼17.8			

=== 2013 election ===
Federal election (2013): Nordsachsen
Notes:	Blue background denotes the winner of the electorate vote. Pink background denotes a candidate elected from their party list. Yellow background denotes an electorate win by a list member, or other incumbent. A ✓ or ✗ denotes status of any incumbent, win or lose respectively.						
Party	Candidate	Votes	%	±%	Party votes	%	±%
CDU	Marian Wendt	49,906	45.6	▲4.7	49,473	44.9	▲9.3
Left	Susanna Karawanskij	23,843	21.8	▼4.0	22,696	20.6	▼5.1
SPD	Heiko Wittig	22,316	20.4	▲5.7	16,970	15.4	▼0.3
AfD					6,762	6.1	
NPD	Jens Gatter	5,572	5.1	▲0.4	4,272	3.9	▼0.8
Greens	Bernd Brandtner	3,399	3.1	▼0.9	3,144	2.9	▼1.6
FDP	Jutta Kreitz	2,276	2.1	▼7.8	2,912	2.6	▼10.1
Pirates	Henny Kellner	2,149	2.0		2,141	1.9	
FW					1,158	1.1	
PRO					394	0.4	
BüSo					137	0.1	▼0.4
MLPD					104	0.1	▼0.1
Informal votes		2,610			1,908		
Total valid votes		109,461			110,163		
Turnout		112,071	66.4	▲5.0			
CDU hold	Majority	26,063	23.8	▲8.6			

=== 2009 election ===
Federal election (2009): Nordsachsen
Notes:	Blue background denotes the winner of the electorate vote. Pink background denotes a candidate elected from their party list. Yellow background denotes an electorate win by a list member, or other incumbent. A ✓ or ✗ denotes status of any incumbent, win or lose respectively.						
Party	Candidate	Votes	%	±%	Party votes	%	±%
CDU	✓ Manfred Kolbe	44,147	40.9	▲4.0	38,440	35.6	▲4.6
Left	Peter Porsch	27,760	25.7	▲2.8	27,765	25.7	▲1.5
SPD	Jens Kabisch	15,860	14.7	▼11.9	16,927	15.7	▼9.8
FDP	Rainer Horbas	10,611	9.8	▲4.7	13,747	12.7	▲3.8
NPD	Mirko Beier	5,108	4.7	▼0.3	5,069	4.7	▼0.2
Greens	Peter Hettlich	4,357	4.0	▲1.8	4,783	4.4	▲1.0
BüSo					583	0.5	▲0.1
REP					381	0.4	0.0
MLPD					261	0.2	▲0.1
Informal votes		1,785			1,672		
Total valid votes		107,843			107,956		
Turnout		109,628	61.4	▼12.9			
CDU hold	Majority	16,387	15.2	▲4.9			

=== 2005 election ===
Federal election (2005):Delitzsch – Torgau-Oschatz – Riesa
Notes:	Blue background denotes the winner of the electorate vote. Pink background denotes a candidate elected from their party list. Yellow background denotes an electorate win by a list member, or other incumbent. A ✓ or ✗ denotes status of any incumbent, win or lose respectively.						
Party	Candidate	Votes	%	±%	Party votes	%	±%
CDU	✓ Manfred Kolbe	60,846	36.5	▼2.2	50,650	30.4	▼2.8
SPD	Gabriele Hertel	43,336	26.0	▼8.9	42,124	25.3	▼10.7
Left	Thomas Kind	38,591	23.2	▲5.7	40,895	24.5	▲8.1
NPD	Jürgen Gansel	8,783	5.3		8,591	5.2	▲3.7
FDP	Johannes Müller	8,584	5.2	▼1.3	14,960	9.0	▲1.9
Greens	Thoralf Koß	4,349	2.6	▲0.1	5,820	3.5	▲0.3
BüSo	Andreas Lelke	1,426	0.9		857	0.5	▲0.4
Alliance for Health, Peace and Social Justice					1,127	0.7	
Independent	Stefan Spaarmann	646	0.4				
REP					594	0.4	▼0.4
SGP					392	0.2	
PBC					362	0.2	0.0
MLPD					224	0.1	
Informal votes		3,404			3,369		
Total valid votes		166,561			166,596		
Turnout		169,965	74.3	▲3.0			
CDU hold	Majority	17,510	10.5				
