= Meißen 3 =

State electoral district of Germany

38: Meißen 3
- Electoral district for the Landtag of Saxony
- Meißen 3 in 2024
- District: Meissen
- Electorate: 50,723 (2024)
- Major settlements: Meißen and Nossen

Current electoral district
- Party: AfD
- Member: Thomas Kirste

Meißen 3 is an electoral constituency (German: Wahlkreis) represented in the Landtag of Saxony. It elects one member via first-past-the-post voting. Under the constituency numbering system, it is designated as constituency 38. It is within the district of Meissen.

== Geography ==
The constituency comprises the towns of Meißen and Nossen, and the municipalities ofKlipphausen, Niederau, and Weinböhla within the district of Meissen.

There were 50,723 eligible voters in 2024.

== Members ==
Election	Member	Party	%
2014	Daniela Kuge	CDU	39.4
2019	Thomas Kirste	AfD	34.2
2024	Thomas Kirste	AfD	40.0

== Election results ==
=== 2024 election ===
State election (2024): Meißen 3
Notes:	Blue background denotes the winner of the electorate vote. Pink background denotes a candidate elected from their party list. Yellow background denotes an electorate win by a list member, or other incumbent. A ✓ or ✗ denotes status of any incumbent, win or lose respectively.						
Party	Candidate	Votes	%	±%	Party votes	%	±%
AfD	✓ Thomas Kirste	14,696	40.0	▲5.8	13,756	37.4	▲3.8
CDU	Daniela Kuge	12,013	32.7	▲1.5	11,700	31.8	▲0.8
BSW	Werner Lutz Thieme	3,713	10.1		4,204	11.4	
SPD	Frank Richter	2,205	6.0	▼4.1	2,096	5.7	▼1.3
FW	André Langerfeld	903	2.5	▼2.6	602	1.6	▼1.7
FDP	Martin Bahrmann	864	2.4	▼4.1	447	1.2	▼3.9
Left	Stefan Hartmann	842	2.3	▼6.0	791	2.1	▼5.7
Greens	Heiko Reinhold	804	2.2	▼2.5	1,190	3.2	▼2.9
Freie Sachsen	A. Frank Sadowski	288	0.8		870	2.4	
APT					357	1.0	
Independent	Thomas Ender	268	0.7				
PARTEI					251	0.7	▼0.6
BD					117	0.3	
Values					99	0.3	
Pirates					97	0.3	
dieBasis					73	0.2	
ÖDP	Steffen Frank Förster	138	0.4		62	0.2	
V-Partei3					55	0.1	
Bündnis C					28	0.1	
BüSo					22	0.1	
Informal votes		411			328		
Total valid votes		36,734			36,817		
Turnout		37,145	73.2	▲8.8			
AfD hold	Majority	2,683	7.3				

=== 2019 election ===
State election (2019): Meißen 3
Notes:	Blue background denotes the winner of the electorate vote. Pink background denotes a candidate elected from their party list. Yellow background denotes an electorate win by a list member, or other incumbent. A ✓ or ✗ denotes status of any incumbent, win or lose respectively.						
Party	Candidate	Votes	%	±%	Party votes	%	±%
AfD	Thomas Kirste	11,542	34.2	▲22.4	11,321	33.5	▲21.4
CDU	✗ Daniela Kuge	10,532	31.2	▼8.2	10,472	31.0	▼8.4
SPD	Frank Richter	3,396	10.1	▼1.2	2,370	7.0	▼5.1
Left	Tilo Hellmann	2,788	8.3	▼10.1	2,646	7.8	▼8.5
FDP	Martin Bahrmann	2,185	6.5	▲0.2	1,740	5.2	▲0.5
FW	Brit Reimann-Bernhardt	1,692	5.0		1,133	3.4	▲2.0
Greens	Martin Wengenmayr	1,576	4.7	▼0.5	2,056	6.1	▲0.9
APT					556	1.6	▲0.3
PARTEI					440	1.3	▲0.9
NPD					207	0.6	▼4.6
Verjüngungsforschung					170	0.5	
ÖDP					151	0.4	
Awakening of German Patriots - Central Germany					128	0.4	
Pirates					122	0.4	▼0.7
The Blue Party					117	0.3	
PDV					66	0.2	
Humanists					37	0.1	
DKP					28	0.1	
BüSo					15	0.0	▼0.4
Informal votes		422			358		
Total valid votes		33,711			33,775		
Turnout		34,133	66.2	▲17.7			
AfD gain from CDU	Majority	1,010	3.0				

=== 2014 election ===
State election (2014): Meißen 3
Notes:	Blue background denotes the winner of the electorate vote. Pink background denotes a candidate elected from their party list. Yellow background denotes an electorate win by a list member, or other incumbent. A ✓ or ✗ denotes status of any incumbent, win or lose respectively.						
Party	Candidate	Votes	%	±%	Party votes	%	±%
CDU	Daniela Kuge	9,792	39.4		9,834	39.4	
Left		4,570	18.4		4,068	16.3	
AfD		2,929	11.8		3,016	12.1	
SPD		2,802	11.3		3,008	12.1	
FDP		1,567	6.3		1,161	4.7	
Greens		1,280	5.2		1,237	5.0	
NPD		1,189	4.8		1,286	5.2	
FW					338	1.4	
APT					320	1.3	
Pirates		343	1.4		263	1.1	
Pro Germany Citizens' Movement					149	0.6	
PARTEI					112	0.4	
BüSo		236	0.9		95	0.4	
DSU		144	0.6		68	0.3	
Informal votes		463			360		
Total valid votes		24,852			24,955		
Turnout		25,315	48.5	▼2.1			
CDU win new seat	Majority	5,222	21.0				

== See also ==
- Politics of Saxony
- Landtag of Saxony
