= Marian Wendt =

German politician

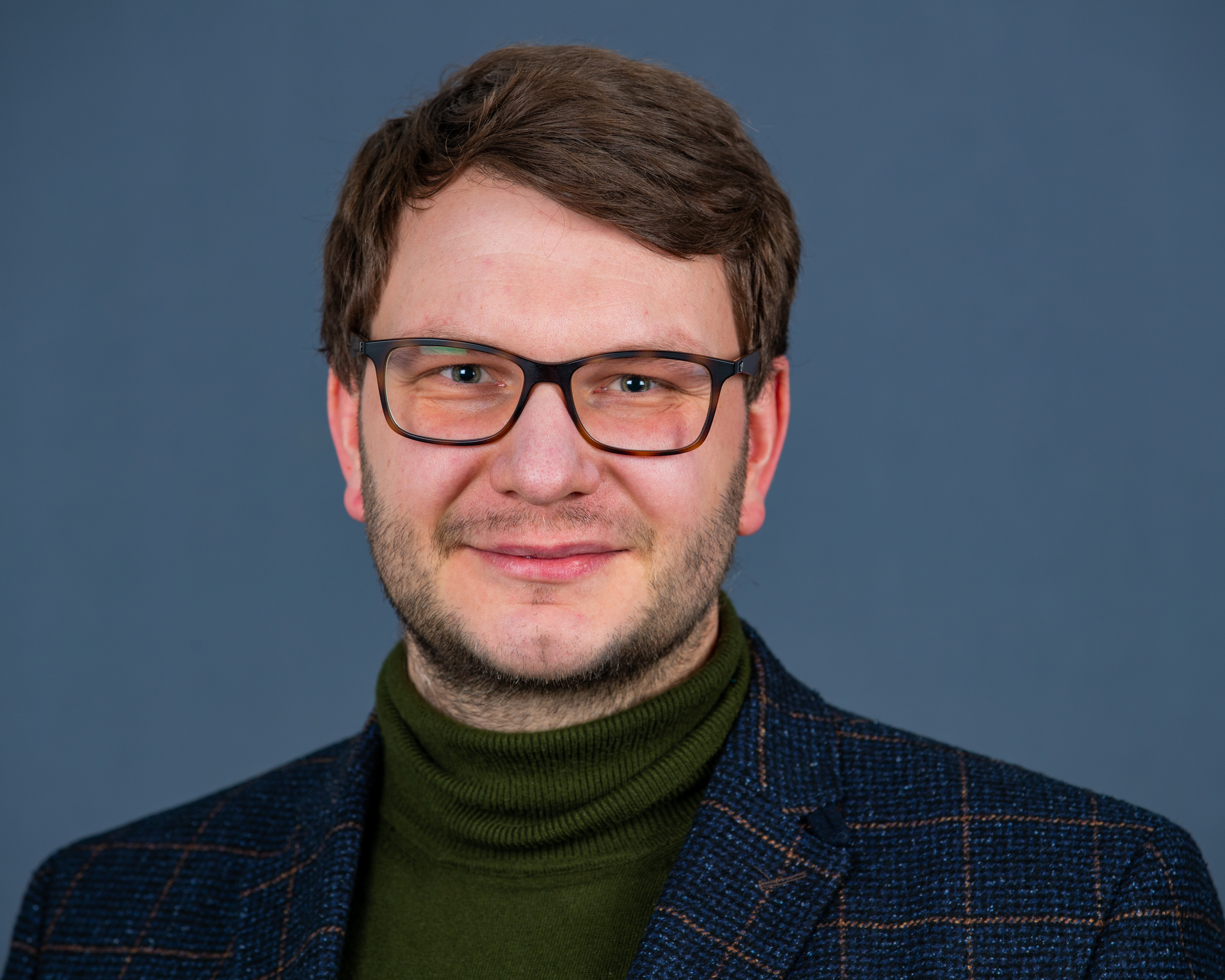
- Marian Wendt in 2020

Member of the Bundestag
- In office 2013–2021
- Preceded by: Manfred Kolbe
- Succeeded by: René Bochmann
- Constituency: North Saxony

Personal details
- Born: 9 June 1985 (age 41) Torgau, East Germany (now Germany)
- Party: CDU

Marian Wendt (born 9 June 1985) is a German politician of the Christian Democratic Union (CDU) who served as a member of the Bundestag from the state of Saxony from 2013 until 2021.

== Political career ==
Wendt became a member of the Bundestag in the 2013 German federal election, representing North Saxony. He was a member of the Committee on Petitions and the Committee on Internal Affairs. From 2018, he was also a member of the Committee for the Scrutiny of Acoustic Surveillance of the Private Home. He served as his parliamentary group’s rapporteur on political extremism and the EU–US Privacy Shield.

In addition to his committee assignments, Wendt was part of the German-Italian Parliamentary Friendship Group, the German Parliamentary Friendship Group for Relations with the States of South-Eastern Europe and the Berlin-Taipei Parliamentary Circle of Friends.

In September 2020, Wendt announced that he would not stand in the 2021 federal elections but instead resign from active politics by the end of the parliamentary term.

== Political positions ==
Ahead of the Christian Democrats’ leadership election in 2018, Wendt publicly endorsed Friedrich Merz to succeed Angela Merkel as the party’s chair. For the 2021 national elections, he later endorsed Markus Söder as the Christian Democrats' joint candidate to succeed Merkel as Germany's chancellor.
