= Siege of Gana =

929 German-Slavic battle

Date	Early 929
Location	Hof/Stauchitz
Result	German victory

Belligerents
Kingdom of Germany	Glomacze

Commanders and leaders
Henry the Fowler	Unknown

Strength
Unknown	Unknown

Casualties and losses
~1,000 killed or wounded	All Survivors Executed; Young boys and girls enslaved

The siege of Gana was a twenty-day campaign by a German army led by King Henry the Fowler against a Slavic Glomacze fortification. It took place in early 929 at the fortress of Gana, named after the nearby Jahna river.

In early 929, King Henry launched a campaign along his eastern frontier against numerous Slavic strongholds. After capturing Brandenburg, he seized several more forts and constructed German ones to secure control of the territory. His second major target was the Glomacze fort at Gana, near modern‑day Hof/Stauchitz. Henry's army overcame the defenses after expending at least 110,000 man‑hours filling in part of the protective ditch. Upon its capture, the garrison was killed on Henry’s orders, while the young boys and girls were enslaved by his professional soldiers (milites).

The subsequent establishment of a German fort at Meissen ensured lasting dominance along the middle Elbe and led to the creation of the Marca Geronis to administer the conquests. The siege of Gana, together with the many other sieges of Henry's 929 campaign, demonstrates the considerable resources the German kingdom could mobilize for extended warfare to conquer, control, and annex new territory.

== Background ==
In the winter of 928, King Henry the Fowler of Germany launched a military expedition along his eastern frontier against a series of Slavic fortifications. His first objective was the princely seat of the Hevelli tribe at Brandenburg, situated on the Havel River. After weakening Hevelli military power through multiple engagements, the Germans stormed the Brandenburg fortress and occupied it. Upon occupation of the fort, Henry proceeded to take over all of Hevelli territory. With its capture, Henry extended control over all Hevelli territory. The next German campaign target was the Glomacze fortress of Gana near the Jahna river.

The next target was the Glomacze stronghold of Gana near the Jahna River. En route, Henry's forces advanced through the Plane valley and into the Fläming hills, seizing additional Slavic forts at Belzig, Mörz, Niemegk, and Zahna. To consolidate these gains, German forts were established in 929 at Strehla—commanding a key ford across the Elbe—as well as at Osterburg and Dahlen, securing the newly conquered region.

== Siege ==
Archaeological excavations in the 1990s and again in 2003 uncovered a fortress in the Jahna River valley near Hof/Stauchitz that may be identified with the Gana site. The fort's walls measured 15 meters thick at the foundation and rose to a height of 6 meters. It was surrounded by a ditch 15 meters wide and 5 meters deep. The circuit of the walls extended 700 meters, enclosing an area of 4 hectares, not including a possible outer fort.

To storm the stronghold, Henry's men had to fill in a 200‑meter section of the ditch. This required excavating some 15,000 tons of earth, a task demanding at least 50,000 man‑hours. The soil then had to be transported and dumped into the ditch using wagons. Estimates suggest 750 carts and 30,000 wagon‑loads of earth were needed, requiring an additional 60,000 man‑hours of loading, transport, and unloading. With only eight hours of daylight in winter, 1,000 men would have needed two weeks to complete the operation.

When Gana finally fell at the end of the 20‑day siege, Henry ordered the defenders killed and the young boys and girls enslaved by his professional soldiers (milites). The ferocity of the conquest suggests the Germans suffered heavy losses. Bachrach estimates more than 1,000 killed or wounded, based on a mathematical siege model applied to the Brandenburg fortification.

== Aftermath ==
After the conquest of Gana, Henry advanced up the Elbe to pursue his ultimate objective: the siege of Prague and the subjugation of Duke Wenceslaus I's Duchy of Bohemia. Along the way, he ordered the construction of a fortress at Meissen. Dendrochronological analysis of its wooden structures confirms an early building stage in 929. Meissen secured German control over the middle Elbe and was soon followed by the creation of the Marca Geronis to administer and defend the new frontier. With reinforcements from Duke Arnulf of Bavaria, Henry invaded Bohemia with a force of 12,000–15,000 men, combining professional soldiers with militia levies. The campaign culminated in the surrender of heavily fortified Prague, marking a decisive success and establishing German dominance in the region.

=== Analysis ===
The scale and success of the German siege operations in 928–929 demonstrate that Henry and the German kingdom possessed the capacity to mobilize thousands of soldiers and sustain them over extended campaigns. Supplying these forces required not only manpower but also transport animals, food, and fodder, indicating a sophisticated logistical network. Such organization reflects the growing ability of the early German monarchy to coordinate resources across its realm, a capability that distinguished it from many contemporary polities and enabled the conquest and permanent control of new territories.

== Bibliography ==
- Bachrach, David (1 August 2013). "Henry I of Germany's 929 military campaign in archaeological perspective". Early Medieval Europe. 21 (3). Oxford: Wiley Blackwell: 307–337. doi:10.1111/emed.12020.
- Pech, Edmund (2015). "Milzener, Lusizer und Glomaci-Daleminzer Kontroversen zur frühen Geschichte der Sorben" [Milceni, Luzici and Glomaci-Daleminci. Controversies concerning the early History of the Sorbs]. LĚTOPIS. Zeitschrift für sorbische Sprache, Geschichte und Kultur. Časopis za rěč, stawizny a kulturu Łužiskich Serbow (2).
- Strobel, Michael; Westphalen, Thomas (2014-02-05). "Die frühmittelalterliche Burganlage von Hof/Stauchitz ist akut gefährdet" [The early medieval castle complex of Hof/Stauchitz is in acute danger] (in German). Dresden: Landesamt für Archäologie Sachsen.
