= Glomatians =

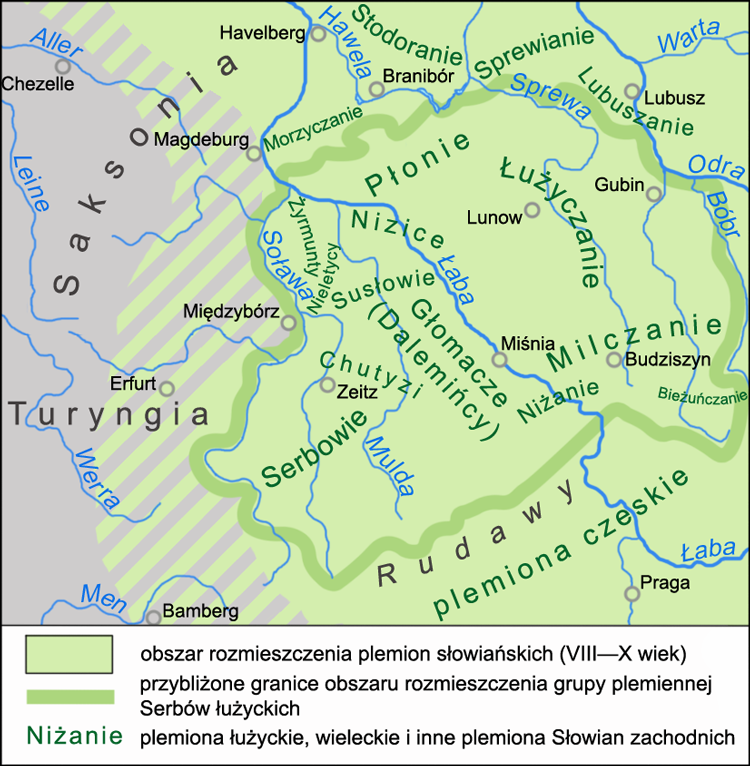
Glomatians (Głomacze) and other Sorbian tribes in the Early Middle Ages

The Glomatians, also known as the Daleminzi (Upper Sorbian: Głomačenjo; Lower Sorbian: Głomacany), were a West Slavic tribe belonging to the Polabian Slavs. They inhabited the middle Elbe valley in what is now Saxony, Germany. According to the early 11th‑century chronicler Thietmar of Merseburg, the tribe was referred to by the German‑Latin name Daleminzi; their Slavic endonym is reconstructed as Glomačane. Mentioned in sources since the beginning of the 9th century, the Glomatians formed part of the Sorbian tribal group and are considered ancestors of the modern Sorbs. Their main settlement was centred on the fortress of Gana, near present‑day Stauchitz in the Meissen district, which was destroyed by King Henry I (Henry the Fowler) in 929 during his campaigns to secure Saxony. Following their defeat, the Glomatians were gradually assimilated into the expanding German population, although Sorbian identity persisted in Lusatia.

== Etymology ==
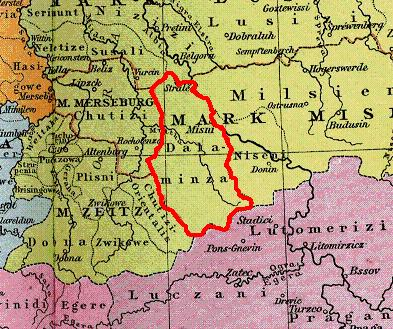
Meissen Gau Dalaminza about 1000, 19th century reconstruction

Scholars found similarity and often considered to be evidence of Slavic north-south migration the Polabian ethnonym of Glomatians and high medieval South Slavic noble tribe Glamočani/Dlamozani and toponym Glamoč in Croatia and Bosnia and Herzegovina.

== History ==
In the mid-9th century the Bavarian Geographer located a Talaminzi (Dala-Daleminzi) settlement area with 14 civitates east of the Sorbs, while according to Alfred the Great's Geography of Europe (888–893) relying on Orosius, "to the north-east of the Moravians are the Dalamensae; east of the Dalamensians are the Horithi, and north of the Dalamensians are the Servians". Scholars often consider them as part of the core Sorbian tribes, but "it is not clear whether they were independent of the Sorbs, subject to them or part of the Sorbic confederation".

The first known account about the Glomatians is from 805, when they were raided by the Saxon troops of Frankish king Charles the Younger on his way to Bohemia. The primary source for those events is the Chronicle of Moissac, that narrates the course and outcome of Frankish campaigns against Daleminzi, noting that their ruler Semil was subjugated and obligated to send two sons as hostages (Latin: "tertium vero transmisit cum Saxonibus super Hwerenofelda et Demelchion. Et ibi pugnaverunt contra regem eorum nomine Semela, et vicerunt eum, et ille dedit duos filios ejus pro fidelitate; et tunc perrexerunt super Fergunna").

In 856, Daleminzi were defeated in battle, some taken hostages, and "made to pay tribute" by king Louis the German who was aided by Sorbian forces. After the Viking raids in the Rhineland against the Saxons in 880, joint forces of the Sorbs, Daleminzi, Bohemians and other near tribes attacked the Slavs around Saale river "faithful to the Thuringians with plunder and burning. Count Poppo, dux of the Sorbian march, came against them with the Thuringians, and with God's help so defeated them that not one out of a great multitude remained".

In the early 10th century, Widukind of Corvey reported, Glomatians long fought against German duke Otto the Illustrious, but not withstanding the attack of his son and new king Henry the Fowler, were responsible in calling the Hungarians fighting against the king. Led by the Slavs, the first army of Hungarians made much waste in Saxony, using the land of Dalamantia as resting place, where waited them second Hungarian army and then ravaged for a second time.

After king Henry arranged peace with Hungarians in c. 924, he started to prepare for the conquest of the tribe, which started in early 929. The king seized and destroyed their main castle called Gana at the 20-day siege of Gana (located near present-day Hof/Stauchitz), exterminated the defenders and had a fortress erected on the hill of Meissen (Mišno), making the subdued tribes his tributaries.

Their settlement area was incorporated into the large Saxon Marca Geronis and in 965 became part of the Margraviate of Meissen.

== Sources ==
- Althoff, Gerd (1999). "Saxony and the Elbe Slavs in the Tenth Century". The New Cambridge Medieval History. Vol. 3. Cambridge: Cambridge University Press. pp. 267–292.
- Bachrach, David S. (2013). "Henry I of Germany's 929 military campaign in archaeological perspective". Early Medieval Europe. 21 (3): 307–337.
- Bachrach, David S. (2020). "The Eastern Campaigns of King Henry II of Germany, 1003–17". Journal of Medieval Military History. 18: 1–36.
- Bachrach, Bernard S.; Bachrach, David S., eds. (2014). Widukind of Corvey: Deeds of the Saxons. Washington: The Catholic University of America Press.
- Dvornik, Francis (1949). The Making of Central and Eastern Europe. London: Polish Research Centre Ltd.
- Hardt, Matthias (2001). "Hesse, Elbe, Saale and the Frontiers of the Carolingian empire". The Transformation of Frontiers: From Late Antiquity to the Carolingians. Leiden: Brill. pp. 219–232.
- Havlíková, Lubomíra (2016). "What was the location of Serbia mentioned in the Cosmas Chronicle of the Czechs?". Споменица др Тибора Живковића. Београд: Историјски институт. pp. 185–191.
- Pech, Edmund (2015). "Milzener, Lusizer und Glomaci-Daleminzer: Kontroversen zur frühen Geschichte der Sorben". Lětopis: Zeitschrift für sorbische Sprache, Geschichte und Kultur: Časopis za rěč, stawizny a kulturu Łužiskich Serbow. 62 (2): 119–132.
- Pertz, Georg Heinrich, ed. (1826). "Chronicon Moissiacense". Monumenta Germaniae Historica: Scriptores. Vol. 1. Hannoverae: Impensis Bibliopolii Aulici Hahniani. pp. 280–313.
- Pertz, Georg Heinrich, ed. (1829). "Ex Chronico Moissiacensi". Monumenta Germaniae Historica: Scriptores. Vol. 2. Hannoverae: Impensis Bibliopolii Aulici Hahniani. pp. 257–259.
- Reuter, Timothy, ed. (1992). The Annals of Fulda. Manchester: Manchester University Press.
- Stieldorf, Andrea (2026) [2012]. Marken und Markgrafen: Studien zur Grenzsicherung durch die fränkisch-deutschen Herrscher (2nd ed.). Wiesbaden: Harrassowitz Verlag.
- Strobel, Michael; Westphalen, Thomas (2014-02-05). "Die frühmittelalterliche Burganlage von Hof/Stauchitz ist akut gefährdet" [The early medieval castle complex of Hof/Stauchitz is in acute danger] (in German). Dresden: Landesamt für Archäologie Sachsen.
