= Susanna Karawanskij =

German politician

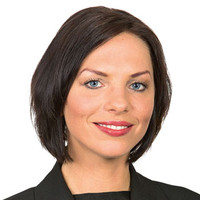

Minister of Infrastructure and Agriculture
- Incumbent
- Assumed office September 9, 2021

President of People's Solidarity
- Incumbent
- Assumed office October, 2020

Personal details
- Born: May 7, 1980 (age 45) Leipzig, East Germany
- Party: The Left
- Education: University of Leipzig
- Occupation: Politician

Susanna Karawanskij (born in May 7, 1980, in Leipzig, East Germany) is a German politician of the party The Left and since September 9, 2021 Minister of Infrastructure and Agriculture in Thuringia. Previously, she was State Secretary in the same ministry from March 4, 2020. She has also been president of People's Solidarity since October 2020. Prior to that, she was Minister of Labor, Social Affairs, Health, Women and Family in the state of Brandenburg from 2018 to 2019.

== Biography ==
She studied political and cultural sciences at the University of Leipzig and subsequently worked as a research assistant at the Institute for Political Science at the University of Leipzig. On December 11, 2015, she was elected to the board of the German Children's Fund. She is married to the chairman of the Left Party of Saxony, Stefan Hartmann.

== Political career ==
Susanna Karawanskij has been a member of Die Linke party since 2008. She has been a member of the state executive committee of Die Linke Sachsen since 2009. Since 2012, she has been chairwoman of her party's district association in the district of North Saxony. In the 2013 federal election, she was a candidate in the constituency of North Saxony and was number 3 on the state list of the Left Party in Saxony. She succeeded in entering the Bundestag via the state list. She was one of seven parliamentary executives of the Left Party in the German Bundestag. Since September 19, 2016, Karawanskij has been her parliamentary group's representative for eastern Germany. In the 2017 Bundestag election, she ran again in the constituency of North Saxony and in 7th place on the Left Party's state list for Saxony, but did not win another mandate.

On September 19, 2018, Karawanskij was sworn in as Brandenburg Minister of Labor, Social Affairs, Health, Women and Family Affairs in the Woidke II cabinet, succeeding Diana Golze, who had resigned from her post in the wake of the Lunapharm scandal involving inadequate cancer drugs. On November 20, 2019, she left her government post with the formation of the Woidke III cabinet.

On March 4, 2020, she was appointed State Secretary in the Thuringian Ministry of Infrastructure and Agriculture in the Ramelow II cabinet, responsible for housing, construction, and transportation.

On September 9, 2021, she took over from Benjamin-Immanuel Hoff as minister in that ministry.
