= People's Solidarity =

German welfare organization

Volkssolidarität
- Founded: 17 October 1945
- Type: gemeinnütziger, eingetragener Verein
- Purpose: social welfare
- Location: Berlin
- Region served: Neue Bundesländer and Berlin (Germany)
- Services: Charitable services
- Members: 109,000 (2021)
- Key people: Susanna Karawanskij (president)
- Revenue: €500 million (2006)
- Employees: 19,000
- Volunteers: 13,000
- Website: www.volkssolidaritaet.de

People's Solidarity (German: Volkssolidarität) is an organisation for elderly people in the new states of Germany, founded 1945. It was one of many important non-parliamentary mass organisations in the former socialist country, East Germany. The organisation required that members pay a "certain amount of money to support senior homes and organized cultural events for seniors." Within the Politics of the German Democratic Republic, People's Solidarity "nevertheless played a key role in East German society." It had 2.15 million members as of 1988.

In "Civil Society in Transition: The East German Third Sector Ten Years After Unification", Anheier, Priller, and Zimmer state, "Unlike Diakonie and Caritas, the Volkssolidarität, a genuine welfare organisation of the former GDR without any counterpart in West Germany and the Red Cross had a more difficult time adjusting to the new political and social environment after unification. The local population, at first largely rejected the Volkssolidarität burdened with leaders with an SED (Socialist Unity Party of Germany) past. Nevertheless, Volkssolidarität and the Red Cross successfully managed to democratize and establish a new image. Both organisations have become fairly established social service providers (Tangemann, 1995)."
