= René Bochmann =

German politician

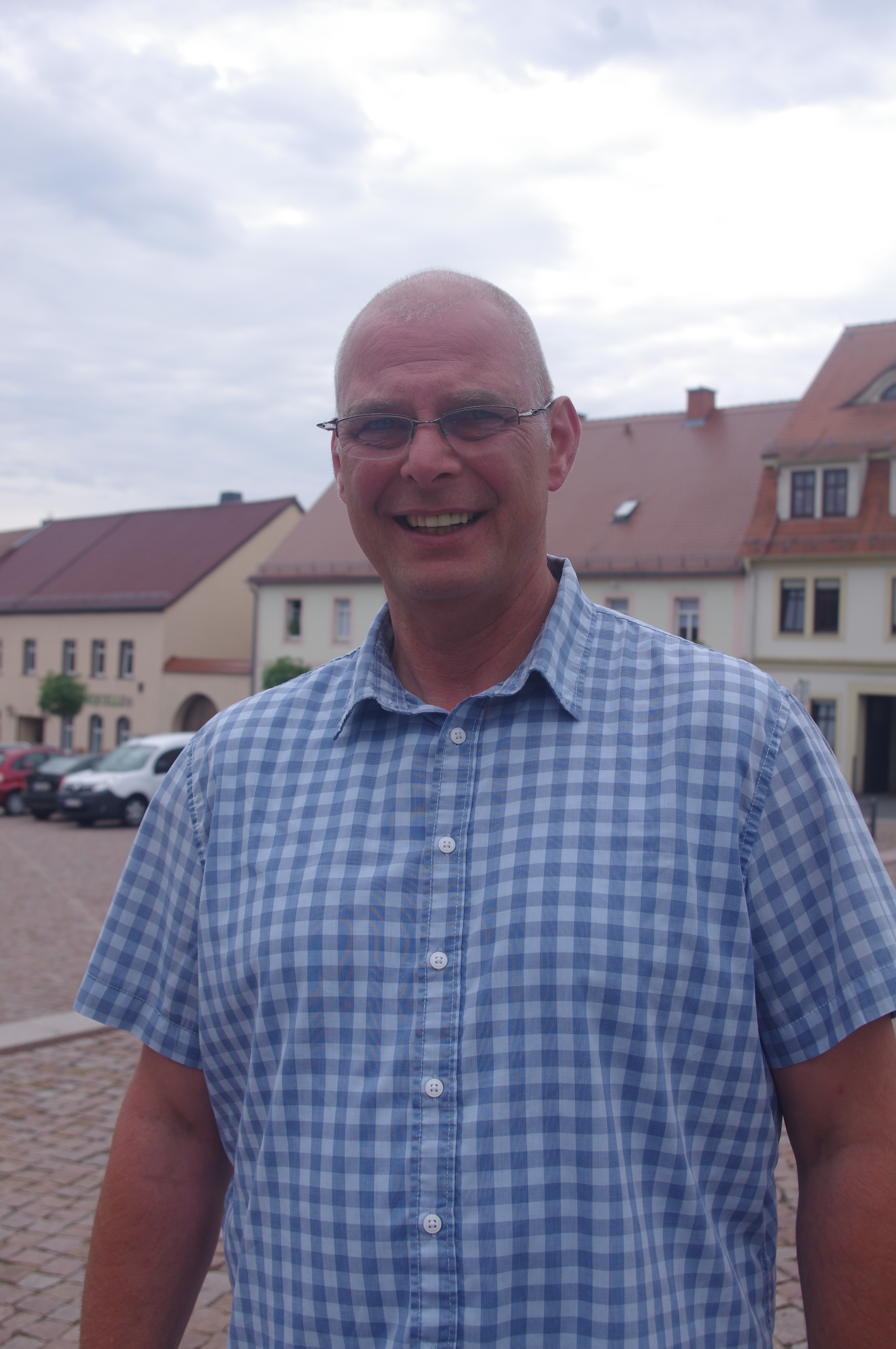
- Bochmann in 2023

Member of the Bundestag for North Saxony
- Incumbent
- Assumed office 27 September 2021
- Preceded by: Marian Wendt

Personal details
- Born: 4 February 1969 (age 57)
- Party: AfD
- Other political affiliations: SED (1987-1990)

René Bochmann (born 4 February 1969 in Markranstädt) is a German politician for the right-wing Alternative for Germany and since 2021 member of the Deutsche Bundestag, the German federal diet.

== Life and politics ==
Bochmann was born in East Germany on 4 February 1969. Between 1987 and 1990 Bochmann was a member of the Socialist Unity Party of Germany (SED). Until 1987 he did an apprenticeship as construction worker at VEB Verkehrs- und Tiefbaukombinat Leipzig, later working in a number of different fields. In 1987, Bochmann was voluntarily deployed with the Border Troops of the German Democratic Republic, his service ending with German reunification in 1990.

He became member of AfD in 2016. In 2021 Bochmann was elected into the Bundestag.
