= Eva Backofen =

German artist and sculptor

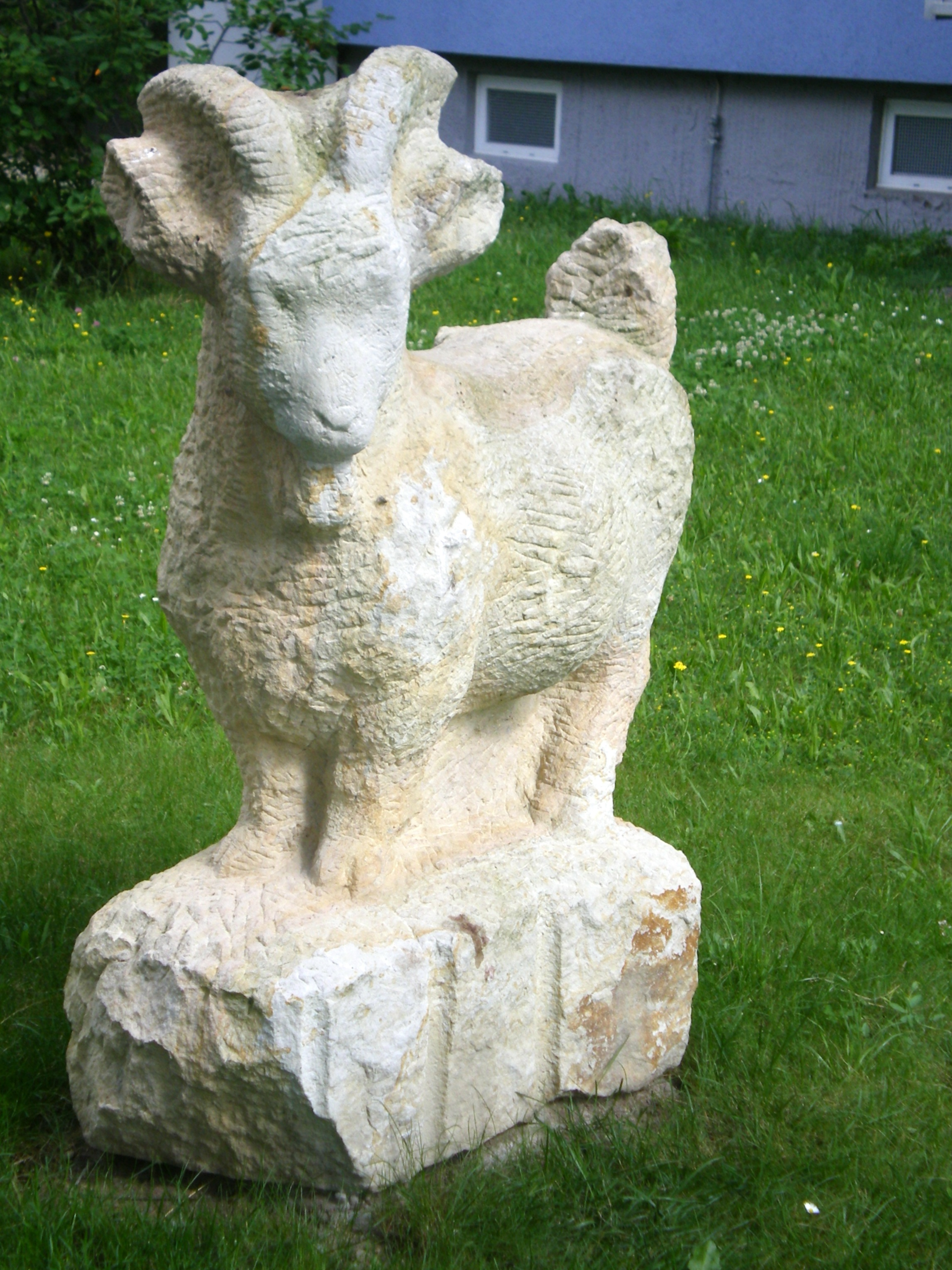
Die Ziege Wohnungsgenossenschaft Johannstadt (WGJ) Dresden 2007

Eva Backofen (born 31 October 1949 in Meissen; between 1980 and 2007 Eva Anderson) is a German freelance graphic artist and sculptor living and working since 1980 in Dresden.

== Life ==
=== Provenance, education and training ===
Eva Backofen was born in Meissen (a short distance down-river of Dresden. When she was not quite three the family moved to Berlin where she grew up and attended primary and middle schools, between 1956 and 1968 in Berlin-Köpenick. Eva Backofen had been born in the same month as the formal launch of the German Democratic Republic (East Germany), the separate German state in which she lived and made her life till reunification in 1990. The country had embarked on a switch to a system of comprehensive secondary schools at the end of the 1950s, and in 1964 Backofen moved on to the "EOS Berlin-Mitte" (formerly the "Evangelisches Gymnasium zum Grauen Kloster"), a four hundred year old former church secondary school which seems to have been in the process of switching to a less classical approach at the time. Here, in 1968, she passed her school final exams ("Abitur"), which in her case included a special skilled-workers' qualification as a dealer ("Handelskauffrau") in laboratory and fine chemicals ("Labor- und Feinchemikalien"). Because of her artistic talent Backofen now took a job as a stage assistant and sculptor behind the scenes at the Berlin Comic Opera in 1968. She combined this with a part time study course at the Berlin-Weissensee arts academy. Between 1973 and 1975 she studied "Theatre sculpture" ("Theaterplastik") at the Dresden Academy of Fine Arts, which she followed up by studying visual arts (Plastic arts department) at the same institution between 1975 and 1980. She concluded her time at the Fine Arts Academy under the supervision of Gerd Jaeger, receiving her degree in 1980.

=== Sascha Anderson ===
By this time she was living in Dresden with the "alternative" author-artist, Sascha Anderson, their daughter and Anderson's son. She supported herself as a freelance sculptor in Dresden and, after the young family had, in 1981, accepted an invitation from the singer-journalist Ekkehard Maaß (whose wife was a ceramics artist) to move to the capital, Berlin. It was only some years later that it emerged that by the time Anderson and Backofen got together, Sascha Anderson had been active as an informant for the detested Ministry for State Security (Stasi) since 1975.) At some point during the 1980s the close relationship with Anderson seems to have ended, however, since after he crossed to West Berlin in 1986 Eva Anderson continued to live and work in East Berlin and Dresden.

=== Professional ===
In 1984 Eva Anderson (known since 2007 by her maiden name as Eva Backofen) became a member of the Verband Berliner Künstler (loosely, "Berlin Artists' Association "). She then in 1989, joined the "Sächsische Künstlerbund" ("Saxony Artists' Association"). The imperative to participate in membership of professional associations as part of any career plan changed in various ways after 1989, and the reunification that followed in 1990. In 1991 Eva Anderson became involved with "Künstlergruppe Kartoffel" (literally, "Potato Artists' Group"), described in sources as "a kind if communication based public project (Note: "...ein Kommunikativ Art Offenes Projekt".) Backofen's website lists many exhibitions in which she has participated since 1983.

== Notes ==
Media related to Eva Backofen at Wikimedia Commons
