= Daniela Kuge =

German politician (born 1975)

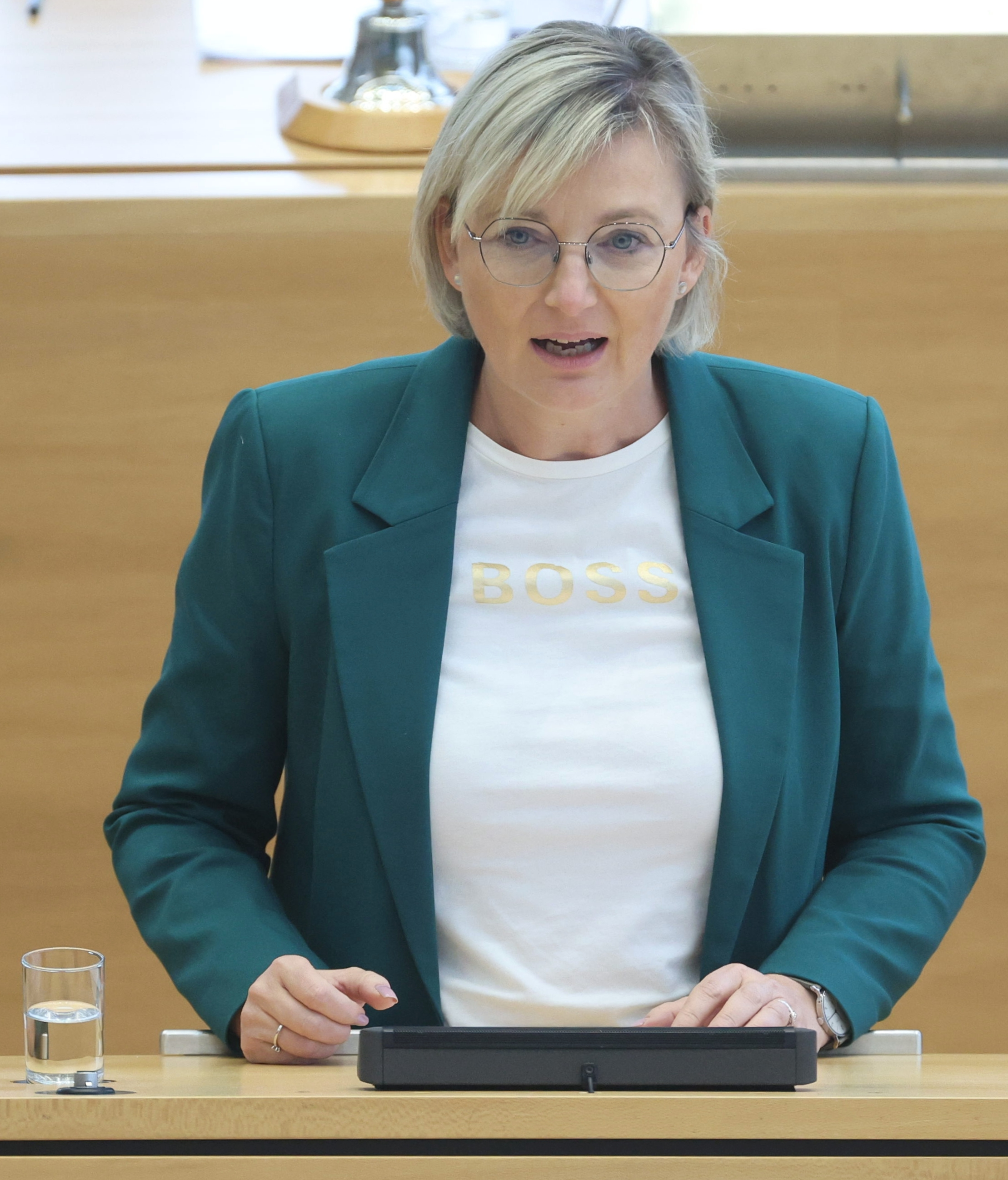
- Kuge in 2024

Member of the Landtag of Saxony
- Incumbent
- Assumed office 29 September 2014
- Preceded by: Karin Strempel
- Constituency: Meißen 3 (2014–2019)

Personal details
- Born: 29 June 1975 (age 50) Meißen
- Party: Christian Democratic Union (since 2011)

Daniela Kuge (born 29 June 1975 in Meißen) is a German politician serving as a member of the Landtag of Saxony since 2014. She has served as chairwoman of the petitions committee since 2025.
