= Meissen =

Town in Saxony, Germany

Meissen Meißen
- Town
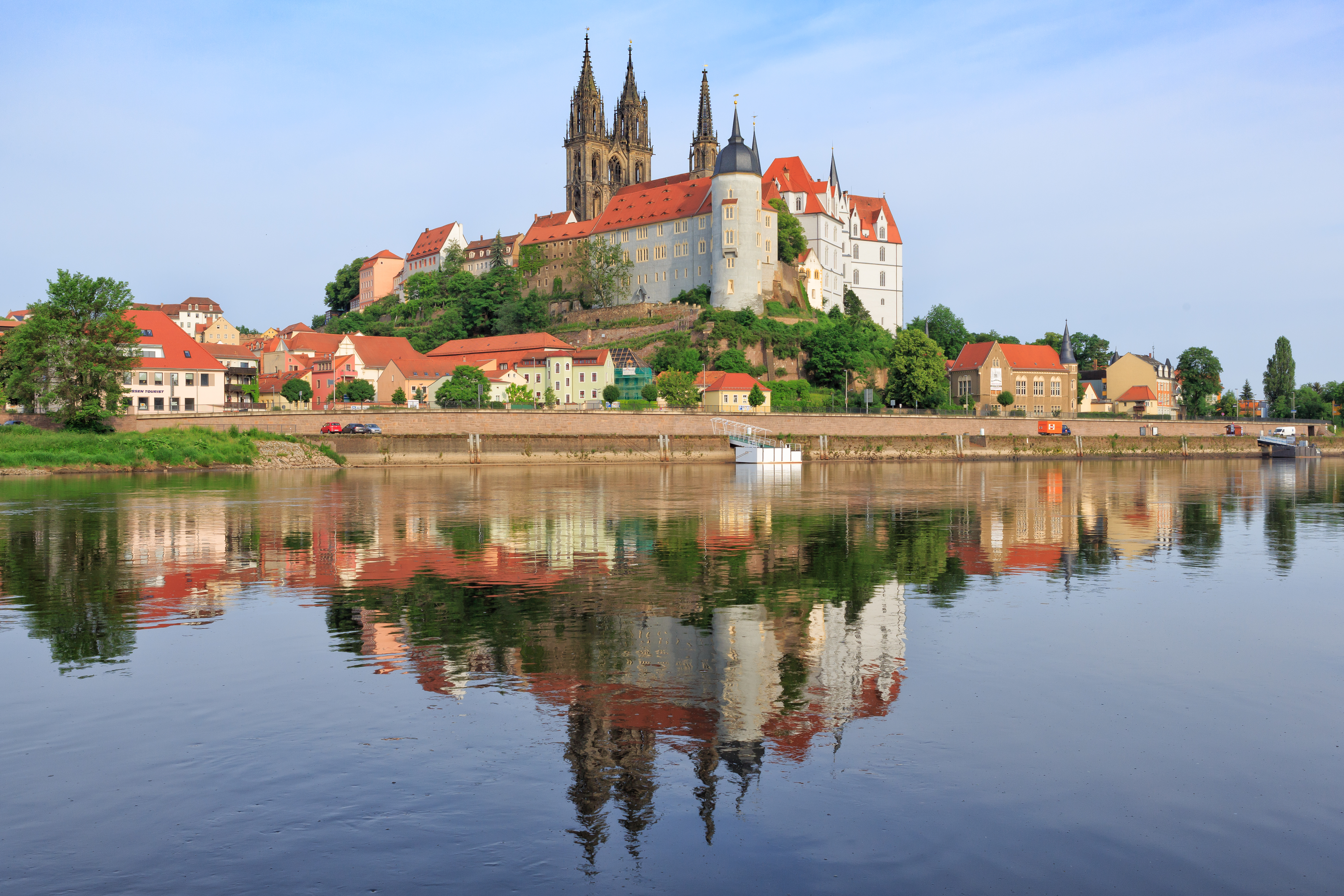
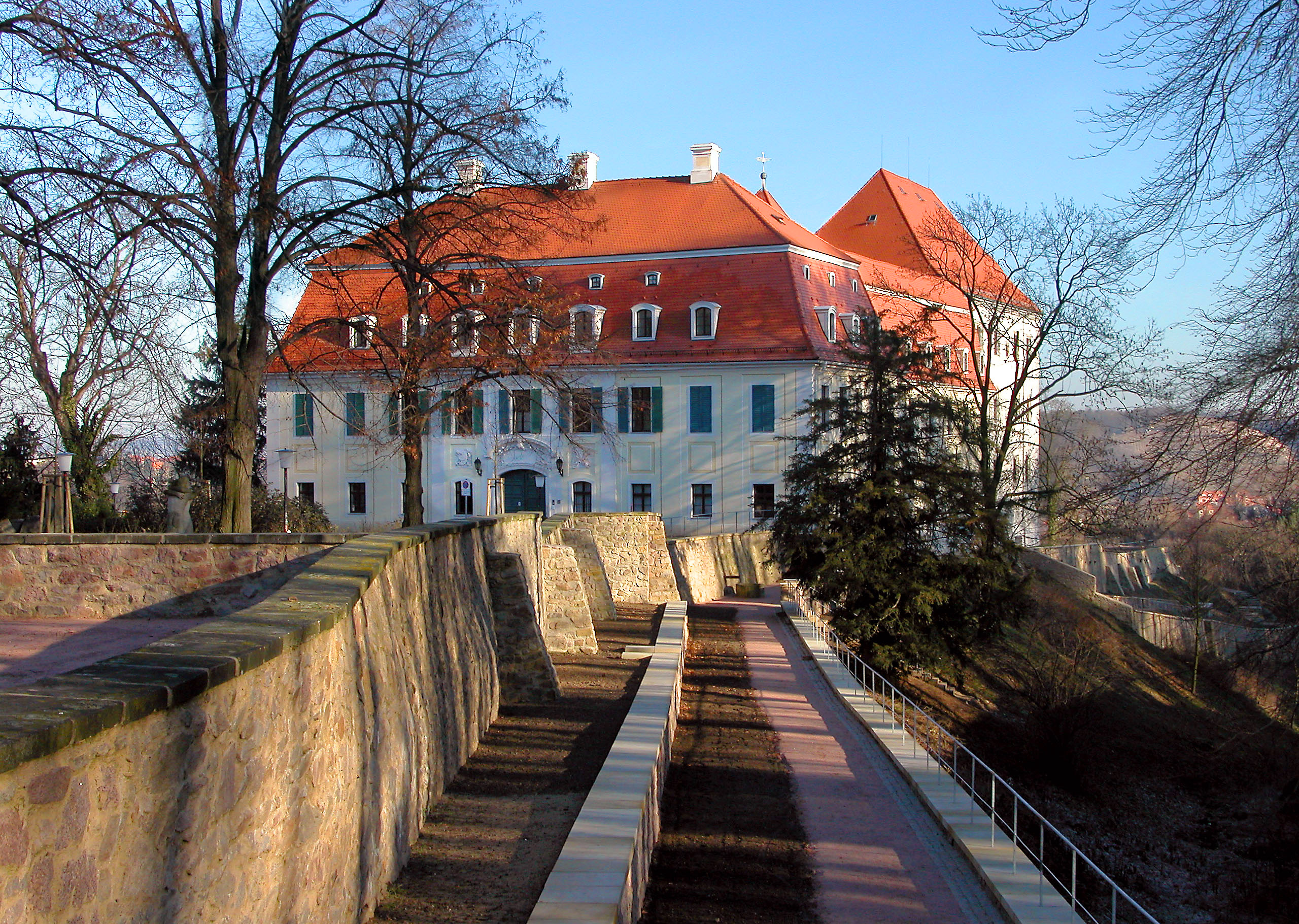
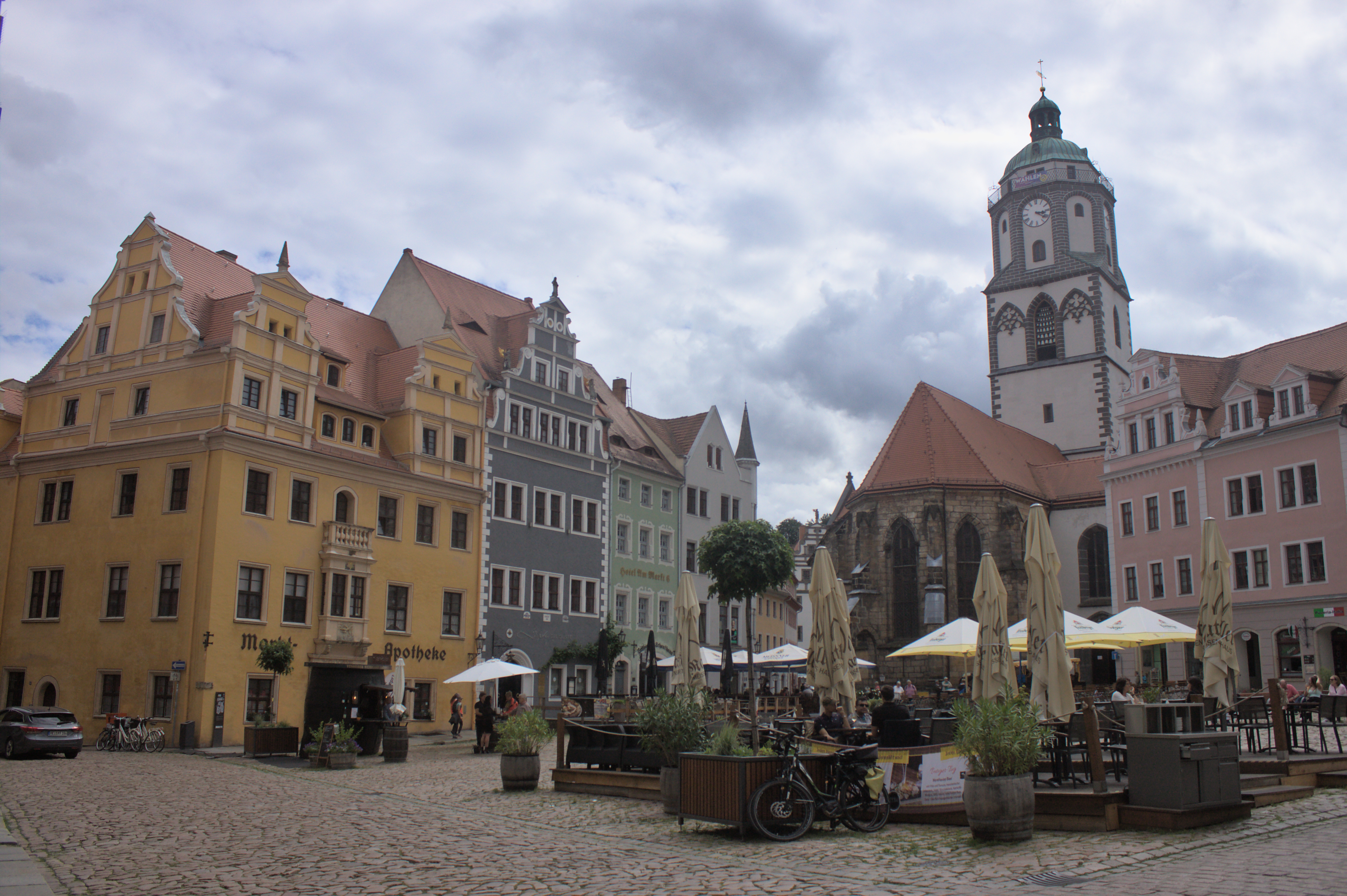
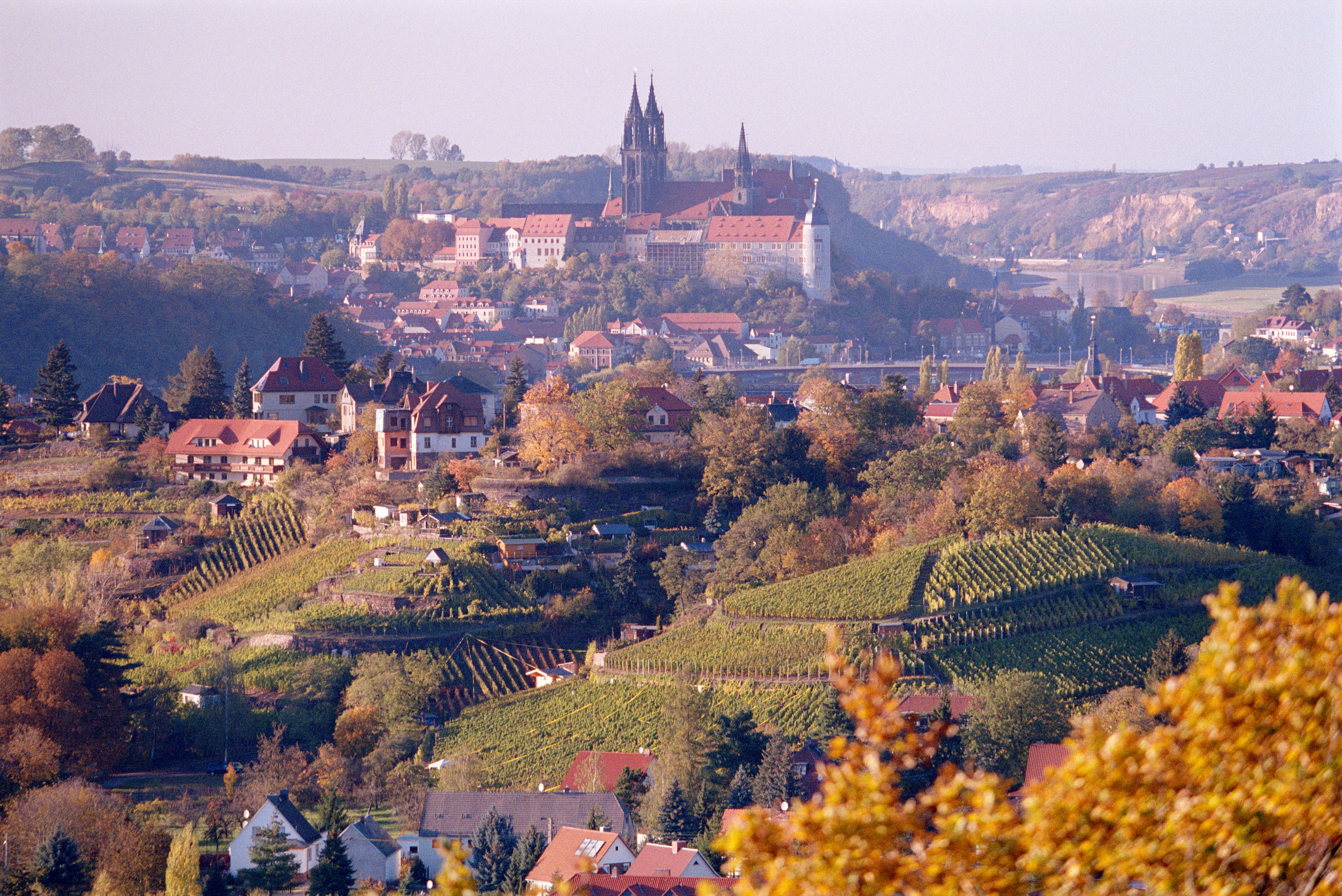
- Albrechtsburg Siebeneichen castle Market square with church View over Meißen with its vineyards

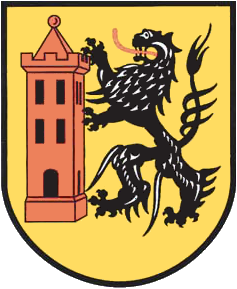
- Coat of arms

- Location of Meissen within Meißen district
- Interactive map of Meissen
- Location within Germany Location within Saxony
- Coordinates: 51°10′N 13°29′E
- Country: Germany
- State: Saxony
- District: Meißen
- Subdivisions: 12 Stadtteile/Stadtbezirke

Government
  - Mayor (2018–25): Olaf Raschke (CDU)

Area
  - Total: 30.92 km^{2} (11.94 sq mi)
- Elevation: 106 m (348 ft)

Population (2025-12-31)
  - Total: 28,863
  - Density: 933.5/km^{2} (2,418/sq mi)
- Time zone: UTC+01:00 (CET)
  - Summer (DST): UTC+02:00 (CEST)
- Postal codes: 01654–01662
- Dialling codes: 03521
- Vehicle registration: MEI, GRH, RG, RIE
- Website: www.stadt-meissen.de

Meissen (German: Meißen [ˈmaɪsn̩]; Upper Sorbian: Mišno; Latin: Misnia, Misena) is a town of approximately 30,000 inhabitants, situated about 25 km (16 mi) north‑west of Dresden and 75 km (47 mi) west of Bautzen, on both banks of the River Elbe in the Free State of Saxony, in eastern Germany. Meissen is renowned as the home of Meissen porcelain, the Albrechtsburg castle, the Gothic Meissen Cathedral, and the Meissen Church of Our Lady. The town of Meissen, designated as a Große Kreisstadt, serves as the administrative seat of the Meissen district.

In Germany, the name Meissen is the legally registered trademark of the State Porcelain Manufactory (Staatliche Porzellan-Manufaktur Meissen GmbH), while Meißen refers specifically to the city and municipality.

== History ==
Historical affiliations

Margraviate of Meissen 965–1002
Duchy of Poland 1002
Margraviate of Meissen 1002–1423
Electorate of Saxony 1423–1806
Kingdom of Saxony 1806–1871
German Empire 1871–1918
Weimar Republic 1918–1933
Nazi Germany 1933–1945
Allied-occupied Germany 1945–1949
East Germany 1949–1990
Germany since 1990

It grew out of the early Polabian Slavic settlement of Meisa, situated on the stream of the same name and inhabited by the Glomacze (a Polabian Sorbian tribe). In 929, King Henry the Fowler besieged and destroyed the Glomacze fortress of Gana (Siege of Gana), and later founded the fortress of Misnia, around which the German town of Meissen (Meißen) developed. In 968, the Diocese of Meissen was established, and the town became the episcopal see. The Catholic bishopric was suppressed in 1581 after the diocese accepted the Protestant Reformation in 1559, but was re‑created in 1921, with its seat first at Bautzen and now at the Katholische Hofkirche in Dresden.

The origins of Meissen as a political stronghold reach back to 965, when Emperor Otto I founded the Margraviate as a frontier march of the Holy Roman Empire, with Meissen as its capital. By the year 1000, it had grown into a market town of strategic importance. In 1002, Bolesław I the Brave of Poland briefly seized Meissen, though Emperor Henry II reclaimed it within months. The fortress was again tested in 1015, when the Poles under the future King Mieszko II laid siege, though without success. In 1089, the margraviate passed into the hands of the House of Wettin, whose dynasty would rule Meissen and later Saxony for centuries, making the stronghold a cornerstone of their power.

In 1241, the town was attacked during the Mongol raid on Meissen. A small force under Orda Khan overcame the defenders, and much of the settlement was destroyed. The Mongols withdrew from Germany following the death of Ögedei Khan, sparing the region from further devastation.

Meissen was at the forefront of the Ostsiedlung — the intensive German settlement of the rural Slavic lands east of the Elbe — and its reception of town rights dates to 1332. Construction of Meissen Cathedral commenced in 1260 on the same hill as the Albrechtsburg castle. The limited space resulted in one of the smallest cathedrals in Europe, yet it remains celebrated as one of the purest examples of Gothic architecture.

In 1423, Meissen became the capital of the Electorate of Saxony, though the seat was transferred to Dresden in 1464. The town later witnessed the Battle of Meissen in 1759, when Austrian forces defeated the Prussians during the Seven Years' War.

During the Second World War, a subcamp of the Flossenbürg concentration camp was established in Meissen. In 1988, the town again assumed a place of significance in religious dialogue, hosting the signing of the agreement on mutual recognition between the German Evangelical Church — both East and West — and the Church of England.

== Porcelain ==
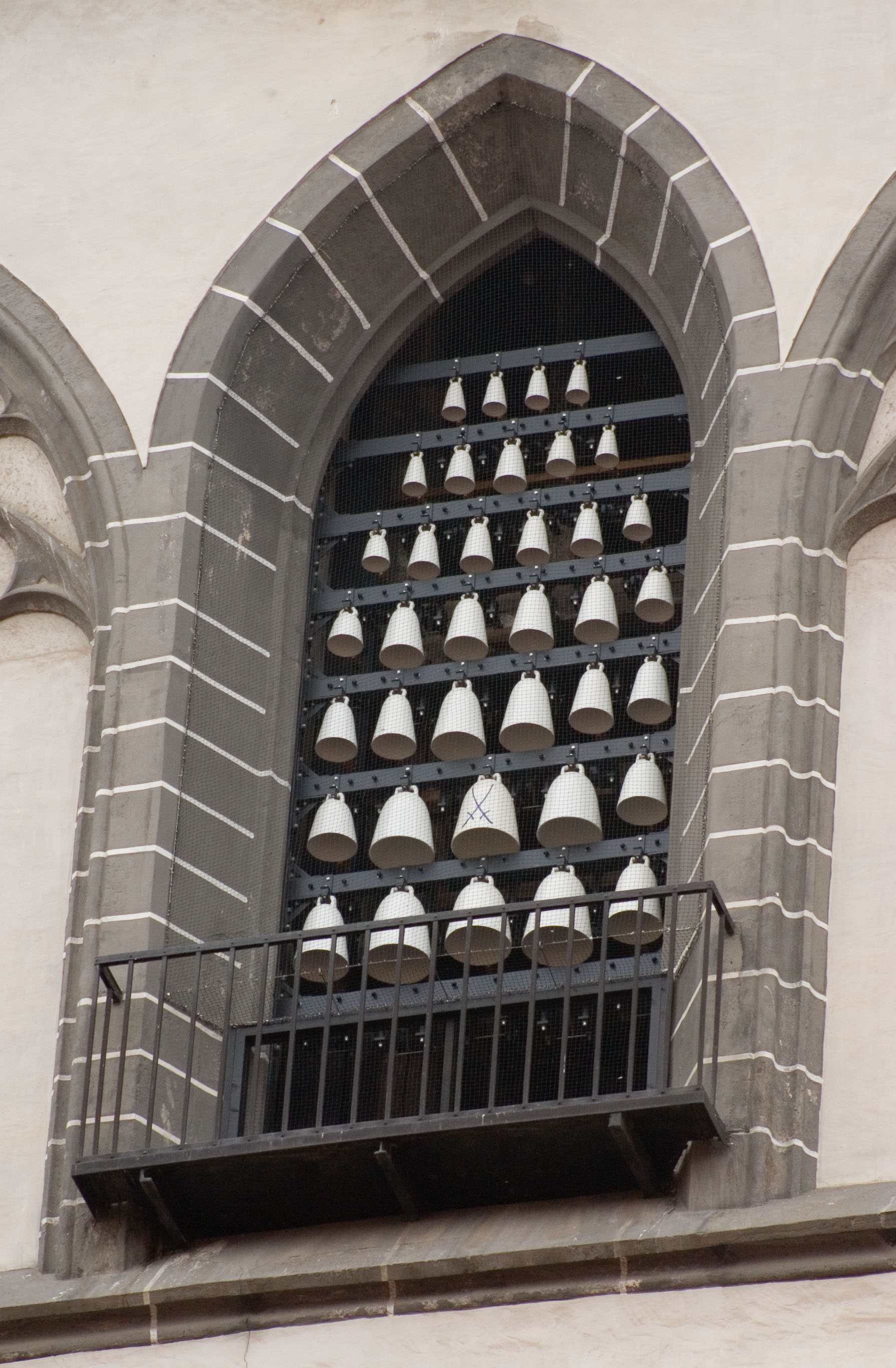
Porcelain bells at the Frauenkirche

Meissen is renowned for its manufacture of porcelain, drawing upon extensive local deposits of china clay (kaolin) and potter's clay. Meissen porcelain was the first high‑quality porcelain to be produced outside the Orient.

The first European porcelain was manufactured in Meissen in 1710, when, by decree of King Augustus II the Strong, the Royal-Polish and Electoral-Saxon Porcelain Factory (Königlich-Polnische und Kurfürstlich-Sächsische Porzellan-Manufaktur) was established in the Albrechtsburg. In 1861, production was transferred to the Triebisch river valley of Meissen, where the porcelain manufactory remains to this day. Alongside porcelain, other ceramics continue to be produced in the town. Within the streets of the old town, numerous porcelain shops have been established, many specialising in antique Meissen porcelain and occasionally offering repair services for damaged pieces. In Meissen and its surrounding area, several former painters from the manufactory have founded porcelain‑painting workshops and galleries, presenting their own works of porcelain art.

== Main sights ==
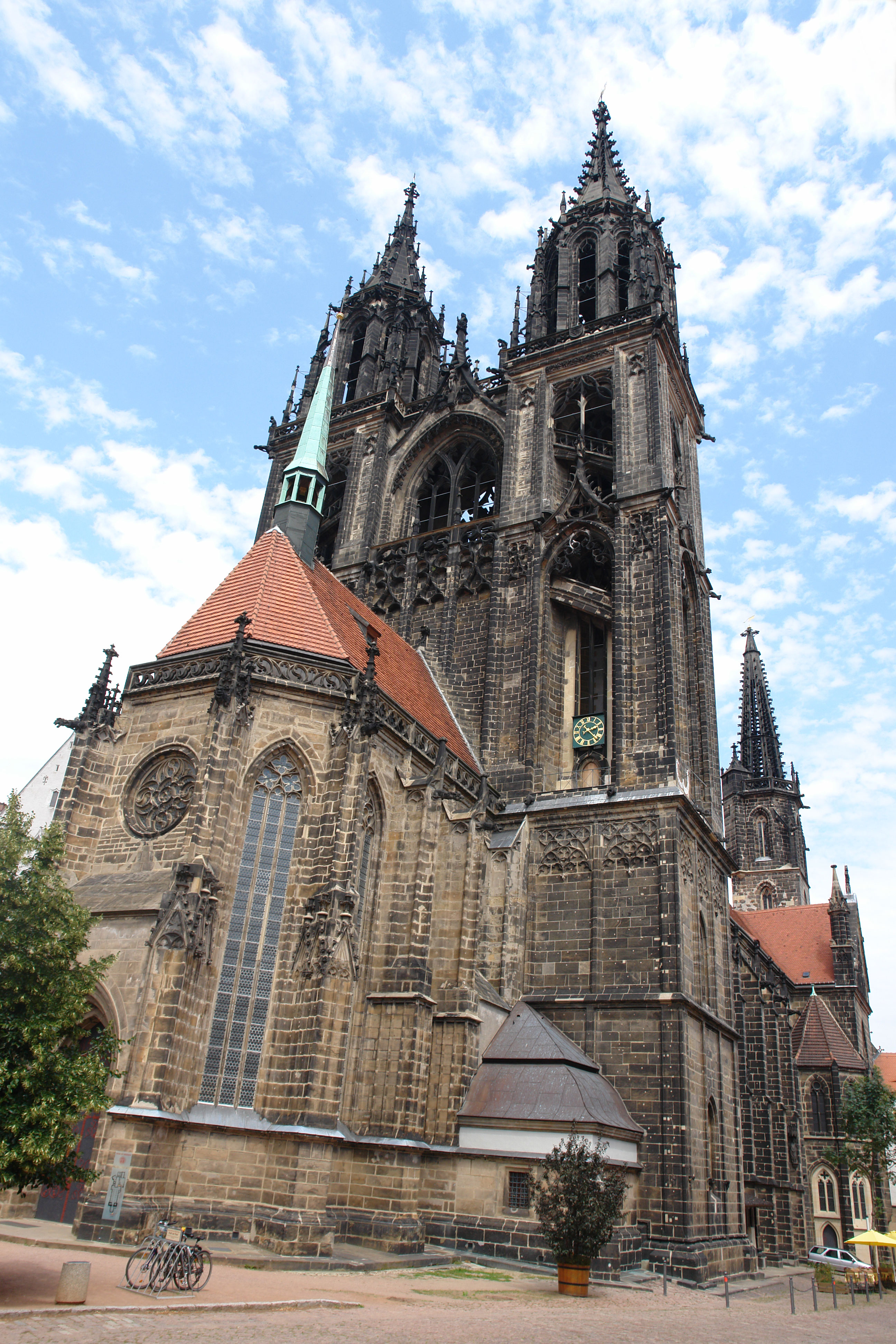
Cathedral

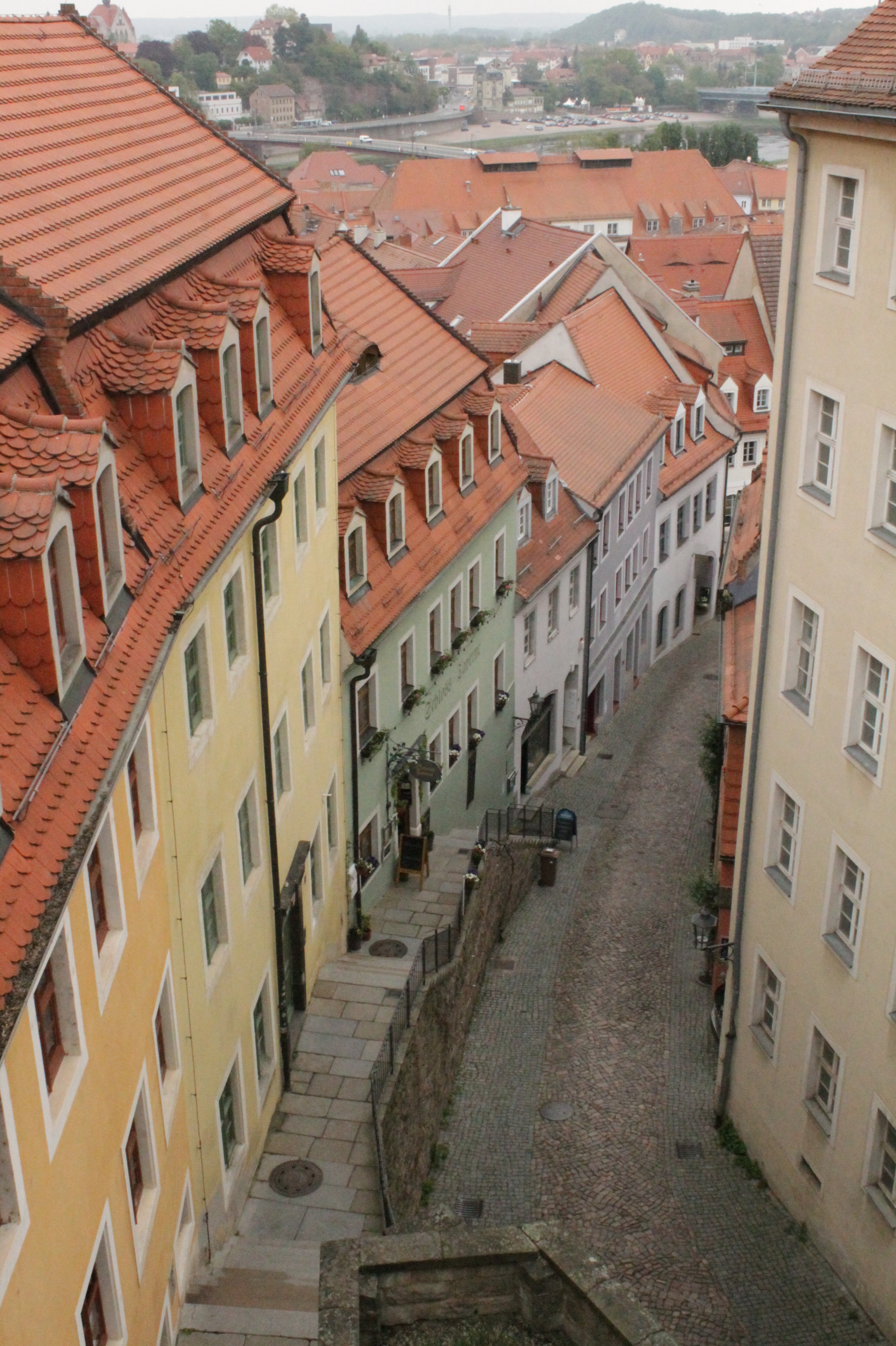
Hohlweg from the bridge to Meissen Castle

The Albrechtsburg, former residence of the House of Wettin, is regarded as the first castle to be used as a royal residence in the German‑speaking world. Built between 1472 and 1525, it is a fine example of the late Gothic style. In the 19th century it was redecorated with a series of murals depicting Saxon history, and today the castle functions as a museum. Nearby stands the 13th‑century Gothic Meissen Cathedral (Meißner Dom), whose chapel is among the most notable burial places of the Wettin family. The hill on which the castle and cathedral rise affords views over the roofs of the old town.

Meissen’s historical district lies chiefly around the market square at the foot of the castle hill and contains many buildings of Renaissance architecture. Equally striking is the view from the 57‑metre tower of the Frauenkirche (Church of Our Lady), situated in the old market‑place. This church, not to be confused with the Dresden Frauenkirche (Dresden Church of Our Lady), was first mentioned in a deed of 1205 issued by Bishop Dietrich II, and after a blaze around 1450 was rebuilt in the late Gothic style as a hall church. Its tower houses the world’s first porcelain carillon, manufactured in 1929 to mark the town’s millennial jubilee. Another major attraction is the world‑famous Meissen porcelain manufactory.

From spring to autumn, several festivals are held in Meissen, including the pottery market and the Weinfest, which celebrates the wine harvest. Meissen wine is produced in the vineyards of the Elbe valley (Elbtal) surrounding the town, part of the Saxon wine region — one of the northernmost in Europe.

== Educational institutions ==
Meissen is home to the Saxon public elite college, the Sächsisches Landesgymnasium Sankt Afra zu Meißen (St. Afra State Grammar School). In addition, the town hosts the Saxon Civil Servants Academy and the Academy of the Evangelical Church of Saxony.

== Sport ==
The Meissen Speedway Stadium is situated on the eastern side of the town, along the Zaschendorfer Straße. It hosted a round of the Speedway World Team Cup in 1965 and has since staged multiple qualifying rounds of the Speedway World Championship, the first of which took place in 1966.

== Notable people ==
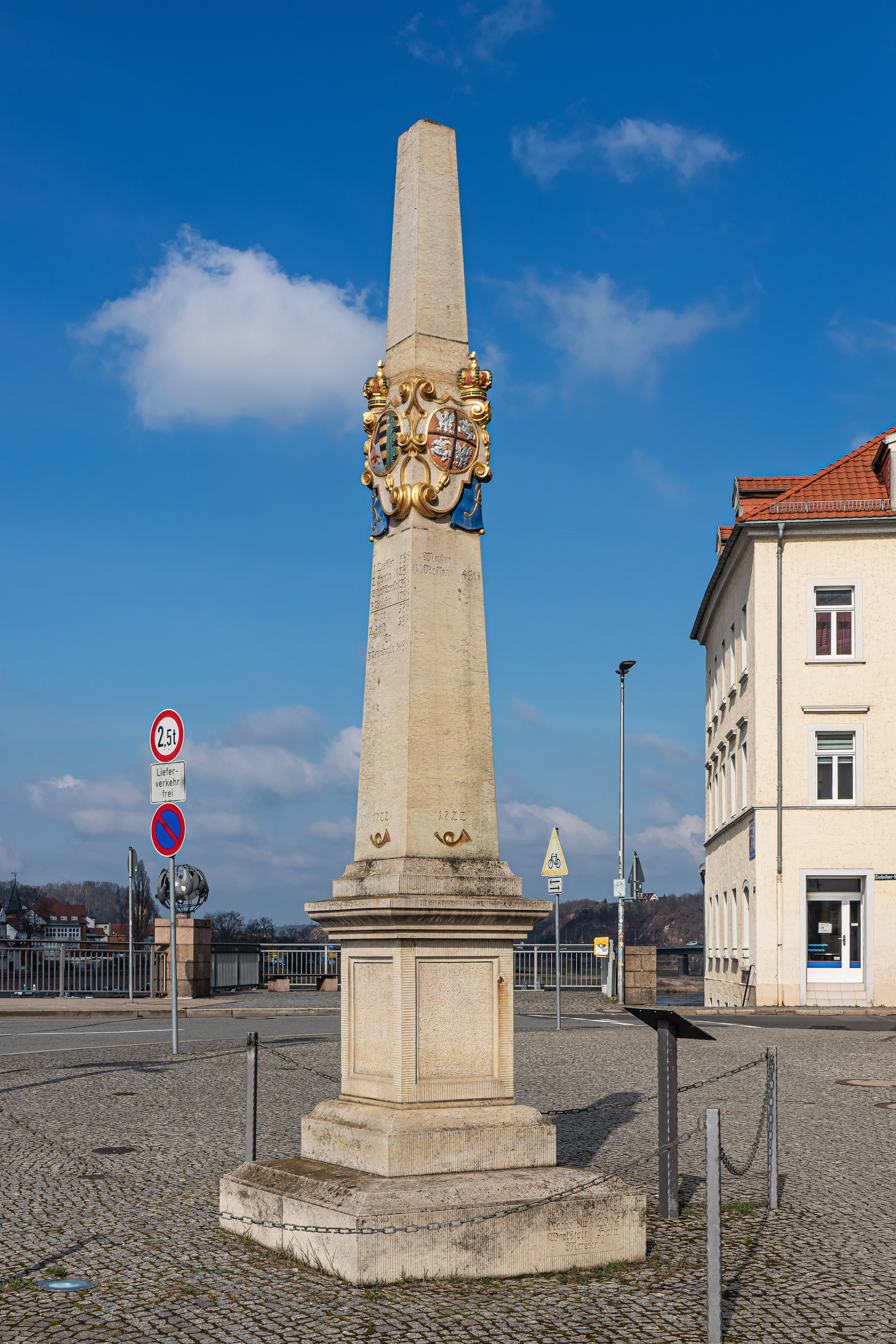
Polish-Saxon post milestone

- Saint Benno (c. 1010–1106), Bishop of Meissen
- Adam of Bremen (before 1050 – 1081/1085), medieval chronicler
- Heinrich Frauenlob (1250/60–1318), poet
- Anna of Saxony, Landgravine of Hesse (1420–1462)
- Heinrich von Sachsen (1422–1435), Margrave of Meissen and Duke of Saxony
- Johann Klaj (1616–1656), poet
- Johann Elias Schlegel (1719–1749), critic and poet
- Johann Adolf Schlegel (1721–1793), poet and clergyman
- Samuel Hahnemann (1755–1843), physician and founder of Homoeopathy
- Louise Otto-Peters (1819–1895), suffragist and women's rights movement activist
- Karl G. Maeser (1828–1901), Mormon academic
- Paul Bang (1879–1945), lawyer, politician and author
- Erich Naumann (1905–1951), Nazi SS-Brigadeführer and Einsatzgruppe commander, executed for war crimes
- Hans Philipp (1917–1943), combat pilot
- Karl-Heinz Rosch (1926–1944), soldier
- Peter Schreier (1935–2019), opera singer and conductor
- Roland Göhler (1943–2025), rower
- Eva Backofen (born 1949), artist and sculptor
- Stefan Schuster (born 1961), biophysicist and bioinformatician
- Ralf Schumann (born 1962), shooter, Olympic winner
- Jörg Urban (born 1964), politician (AfD)
- Stephan Matthias Lademann, classical pianist
- Daniela Kuge (born 1975), German politician (CDU)

=== Worked in the town ===
- Kaspar Eberhard (1523–1575), superintendent of Meissen 1564–1574
- Johann Friedrich Böttger (1682–1719), co-inventor of the European porcelain
- Johann Gregor Herold (1696–1775), porcelain painter and superintendent of the factory
- Johann Joachim Kändler (1706–1775), porcelain modeller
- Gotthold Ephraim Lessing (1729–1781), writer, pupil of the Sächsisches Landesgymnasium
- Willy Ascherl (1902–1929), footballer
- Erich Schmidt (1910–2005), church musician, in 1950–1980 Domkantor in Meissen
- Hans-Ulrich Thomale (born 1944), football player and manager
- Matthias Müller (born 1954), football player and manager

== Names ==
- German: Meißen
- Polish: Miśnia
- Latin: Misnia, Misena, Misnensium
- Czech: Míšeň
- Upper Sorbian: Mišno
- Lower Sorbian: Mišnjo

== Twin towns – sister cities ==
Meissen is twinned with:

- Vitry-sur-Seine, France (1973)
- Arita, Japan (1979)
- Fellbach, Germany (1987)
- Litoměřice, Czech Republic (1996)
- Corfu, Greece (1996)
- Provo, United States (2001)
- Legnica, Poland (2017)

== See also ==
- List of margraves of Meissen
- Proschwitz
- Rulers of Saxony
- Saxon Switzerland
- Meissen groschen
