= Stauchitz =

- Municipality
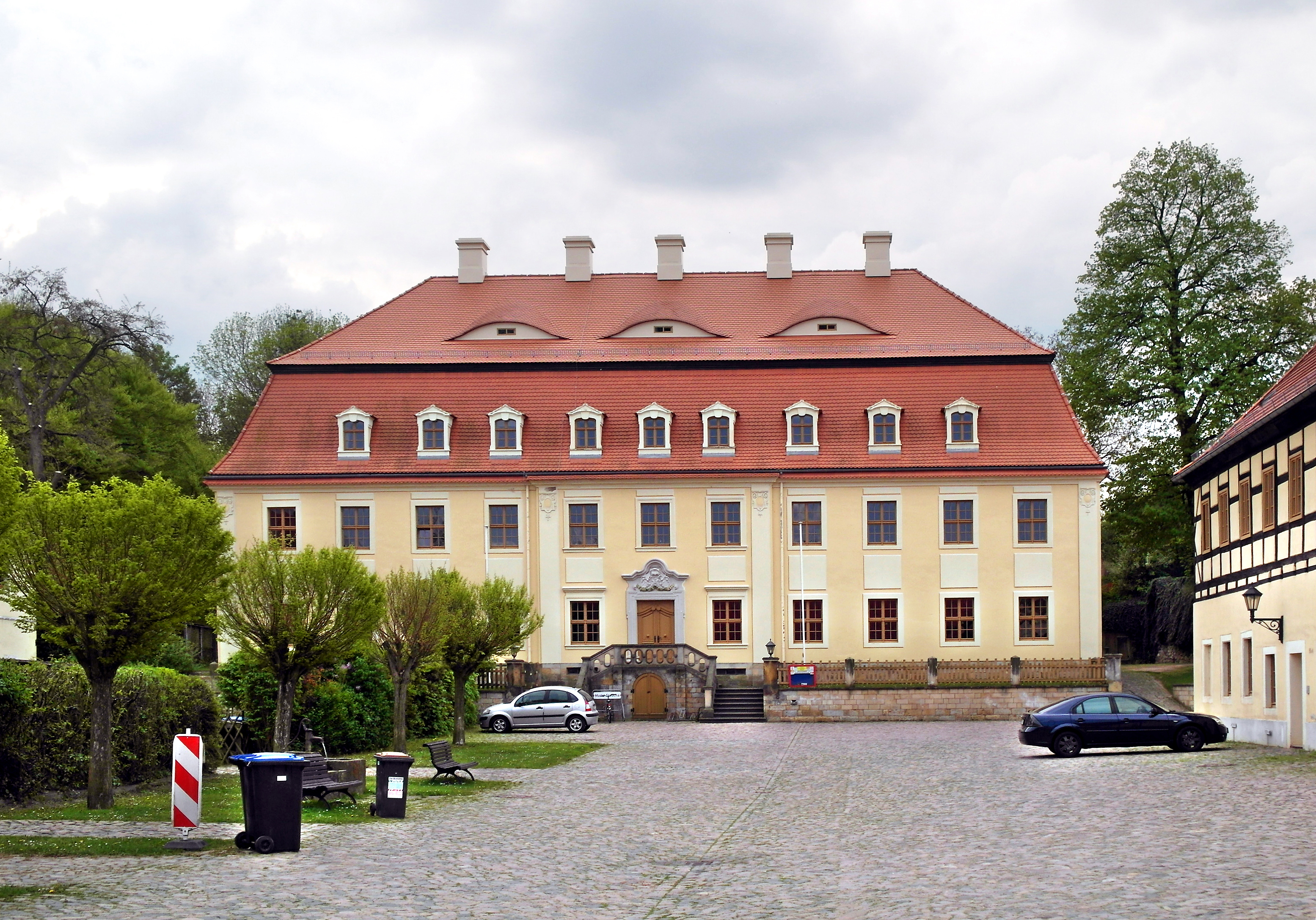
- Manor in Staucha, Stauchitz

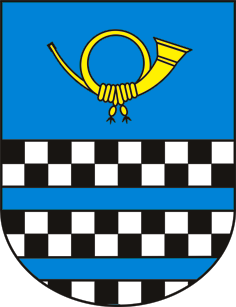
- Coat of arms

- Location of Stauchitz within Meißen district
- Interactive map of Stauchitz
- Location within Germany Location within Saxony
- Coordinates: 51°15′N 13°13′E
- Country: Germany
- State: Saxony
- District: Meißen
- Subdivisions: 21

Government
  - Mayor (2020–27): Dirk Zschoke (Ind.)

Area
  - Total: 33.05 km^{2} (12.76 sq mi)
- Elevation: 124 m (407 ft)

Population (2025-12-31)
  - Total: 2,931
  - Density: 88.68/km^{2} (229.7/sq mi)
- Time zone: UTC+01:00 (CET)
  - Summer (DST): UTC+02:00 (CEST)
- Postal codes: 01594
- Dialling codes: 035268
- Vehicle registration: MEI, GRH, RG, RIE
- Website: www.stauchitz.de

Stauchitz is a municipality in the district of Meißen, in Saxony, Germany.

== Municipality subdivisions ==
Stauchitz includes the following subdivisions:

- Bloßwitz
- Dobernitz
- Dösitz
- Gleina
- Groptitz
- Grubnitz
- Hahnefeld
- Ibanitz
- Kalbitz
- Panitz
- Plotitz
- Pöhsig
- Prositz
- Ragewitz
- Seerhausen
- Staucha
- Steudten
- Stösitz
- Treben
- Wilschwitz

== People ==
- Hanns Johst (1890-1978), German writer
