= Riesa-Großenhain =

Coordinates: 51°17′N 13°33′E

- District
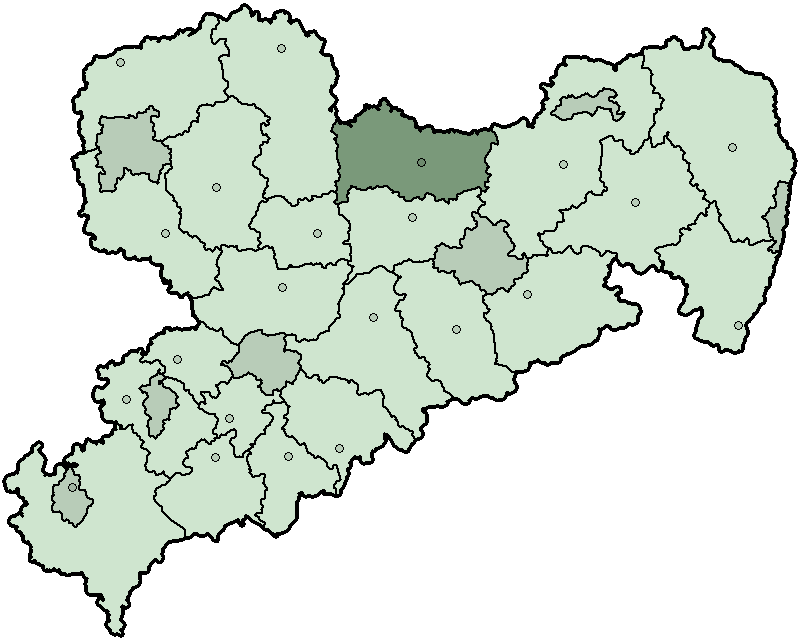
- Country: Germany
- State: Saxony
- Adm. region: Dresden
- Disbanded: 2008-08-01
- Capital: Großenhain

Area
  - Total: 820.51 km^{2} (316.80 sq mi)

Population (2001)
  - Total: 120,539
  - Density: 150/km^{2} (380/sq mi)
- Time zone: UTC+01:00 (CET)
  - Summer (DST): UTC+02:00 (CEST)
- Vehicle registration: RG
- Website: www.riesa-grossenhain.de

Riesa-Großenhain was a district in Saxony, Germany. It was bounded by (from the north and clockwise) the districts of Elbe-Elster and Oberspreewald-Lausitz in Brandenburg, Kamenz, Meißen, Döbeln and Torgau-Oschatz.

== History ==
The district was created in 1994 by merging the two previous districts Riesa and Großenhain. In August 2008, it was incorporated into the district of Meißen.

== Geography ==
The district is situated in the plain countryside north of the virtual line connecting Leipzig and Dresden. The main river is the Elbe which runs through the district from south to northwest.

== Coat of arms ==
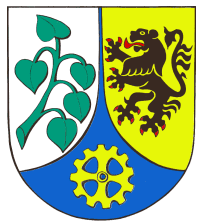
The linden branch in the left of the coat of arms symbolizes the nature in the district, and is also a symbol for Riesa as it was present in the coat of arms of Riesa since 1623. The black lion on yellow ground stands for Großenhain, as it is also present in then coat of arms of the city Großenhain. The cogwheel in the bottom symbolizes the industrial tradition of the district, mostly iron and steel production, engineering and textile production.

== Towns and municipalities ==
Towns
1. Gröditz
2. Großenhain
3. Riesa
4. Strehla
Municipalities
1. Ebersbach
2. Glaubitz
3. Hirschstein
4. Lampertswalde
5. Nauwalde
6. Nünchritz
7. Priestewitz
8. Röderaue
9. Schönfeld

10. Stauchitz
11. Tauscha
12. Thiendorf
13. Weißig am Raschütz
14. Wildenhain
15. Wülknitz
16. Zabeltitz
17. Zeithain
