= Kleine Röder (Black Elster) =

River in Germany

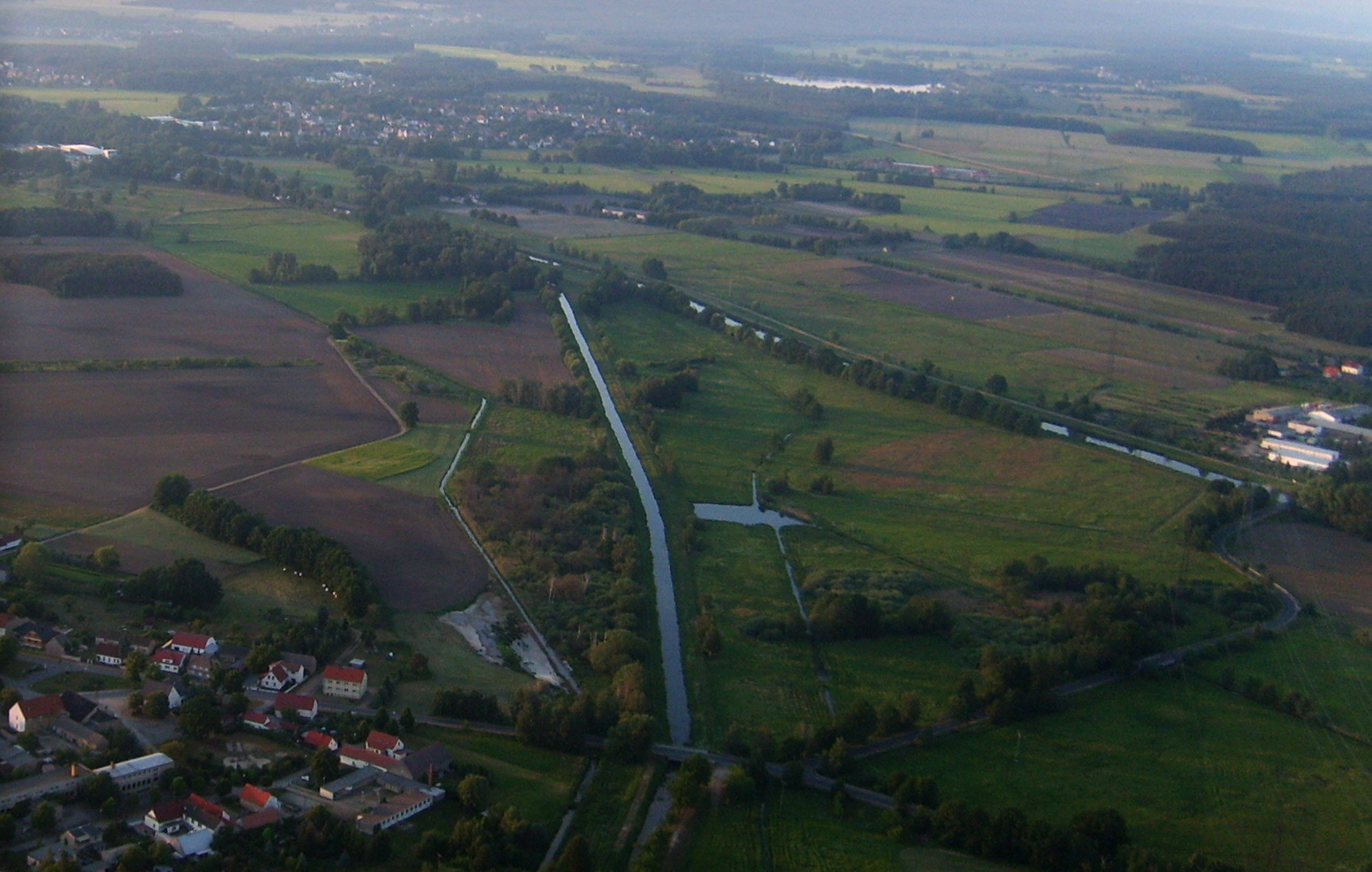
- Confluence of the Kleine Röder and Black Elster

Location
- Country: Germany
- States: Saxony and Brandenburg
- Reference no.: DE: 53852

Physical characteristics
- Source
  - location: branches off the Große Röder near Zabeltitz
  - coordinates: 51°20′45″N 13°29′15″E
  - elevation: 107 m above sea level (NN)
- Mouth
  - location: near Zobersdorf (part of Bad Liebenwerda) into the Black Elster
  - coordinates: 51°30′23″N 13°24′49″E
  - elevation: 86 m above sea level (NN)
- Length: 40 km

Basin features
- Progression: Black Elster→ Elbe→ North Sea
- Landmarks: Small towns: Großenhain, Gröditz, Bad Liebenwerda; Villages: Röderaue, Tiefenau

The Kleine Röder, also called the Schwarzgraben, is a river in Saxony and Brandenburg, Germany.

It branches off the Große Röder near Zabeltitz. It flows into the Black Elster near Zobersdorf (a district of Bad Liebenwerda).

== See also ==
- List of rivers of Saxony
- List of rivers of Brandenburg
