= Saxon Elbeland =

Region of the Upper Elbe in Germany

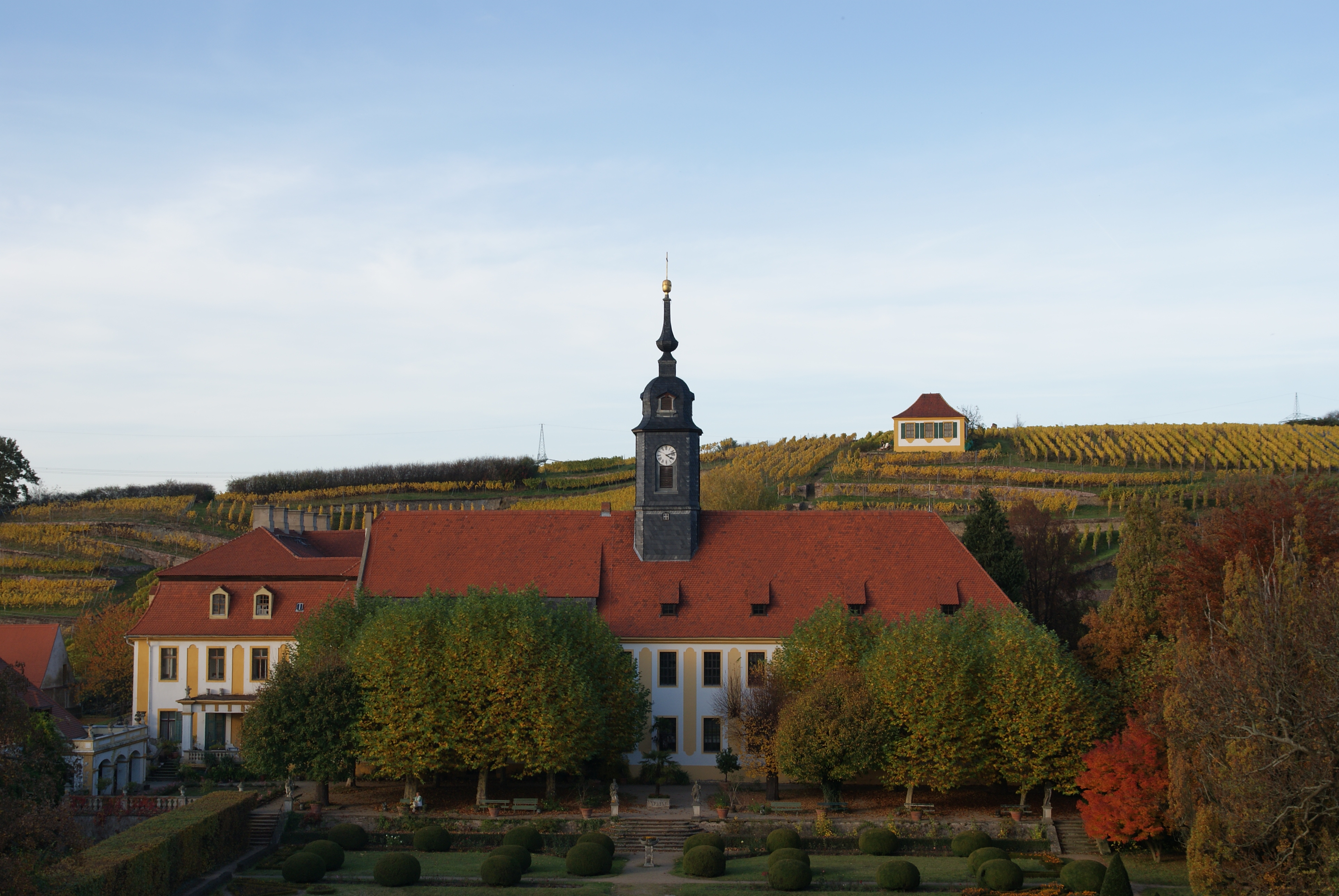
Diesbar-Seußlitz

The Saxon Elbeland (German: Sächsisches Elbland) is a term used in more recent times which describes a region along the Elbe, whose boundaries are not clearly defined, but which extends roughly from the Elbe Sandstone Mountains to Torgau. The best-known cities and town in this area are Dresden, Meißen, Riesa and Torgau. The term is largely synonymous with the region along the river known as the Upper Elbe (Oberelbe), i.e. the German section of the Elbe River nearest its source region.

The tourist association of the same name encompasses the city of Dresden, the northern part of the district of Sächsische Schweiz-Osterzgebirge including Freital and Tharandt, the district of Meißen including Nossen, Lommatzsch, Coswig, Radebeul, Weinböhla, Moritzburg, Riesa, Großenhain and Radeburg, the western part of Bautzen District including Radeberg and Ottendorf-Okrilla and a narrow, strip of land along the river including Torgau, Strehla and Belgern.

The landscape is home to one of the most northerly wine-growing areas in Europe. Here, Saxon wine is produced on the south-facing slopes on the right-hand bank of the Elbe near Dresden-Pillnitz and between Radebeul and the Elbe wine villages around Diesbar-Seußlitz. The vineyards produce just 1% of Germany's total volume of wine.

The Saxon Elbeland also forms the northern part of the Upper Elbe Valley - Eastern Ore Mountains (Oberes Elbtal - Osterzgebirge) regional planning region. This incorporates the districts of Sächsische Schweiz, Meißen and Riesa-Großenhain. As a result, the landscape is also an important part of the Elbe-Labe Euroregion.

The philharmonic orchestra, the New Elbeland Philharmonia, is named after the region.

== Sources ==
- Matthias Donath: Sächsisches Elbland. Edition Leipzig, Leipzig 2009, ISBN 978-3-361-00639-3 (Kulturlandschaften Sachsens 1).
