= Tausche =

Tausche is a surname. Notable people with the surname include:

- Anton Tausche (1838–1898), Czech teacher and politician
- Gerhard Tausche (born 1957), German archivist and author
- Kayla Tausche (born c. 1986), American broadcast journalist

== See also ==
- Tausch (disambiguation)
- Tauche
- Tauschia
- Tauscha
- Tauscher (disambiguation)
- Tauscheria, another name for the genus of moths Estigena
