= Tausch =

Tausch may refer to:

== People ==
- Tutush I (died in 1095), Seljuk ruler of Damascus
  - Radwan ibn Tausch or Fakhr al-Mulk Radwan, his son
- Franz Tausch (1762–1817), a German musician
- Ignaz Friedrich Tausch (1793–1848), a Bohemian botanist
- Lindsay Tausch, American politician
- Terry Tausch (1959–2020), an American football player

== Places ==
- Nyírtass, formerly Tass (German: Tausch), a town in Hungary

== See also ==
- Tausche (disambiguation)
- Tauche
- Tauschia
- Tauscha
- Tauscher (disambiguation)
