= Hirschenstein =

Hirschenstein may refer to the mountains in Germany:

- Hirschenstein (Bavarian Forest), in Bavaria
- Hirschenstein (Ore Mountains), in, Saxony

== See also ==
- Hirschstein
