= Tauscher =

Tauscher is a surname. Notable people with the surname include:

- Alexander Tauscher (born 2002), German racing driver
- Anna Maria Taucher (Maria Teresa of St. Joseph) (1855–1938), German religious
- Ellen Tauscher (1951–2019), American politician
- Hans Tauscher (1867–1941), German army officer
- Hansjörg Tauscher (born 1967), German alpine skier
- Johann Tauscher (1909–1979), Austrian field handball player
- Mark Tauscher (born 1977), American football player
- Walt Tauscher (1901–1992), American baseball player

== See also ==
- Tausch (disambiguation)
- Tauche
- Tauschia
- Tauscha
- Tausche (disambiguation)
- Tauscheria (disambiguation)
