= Kleinnaundorf =

Kleinnaundorf is a municipality subdivision of

- Tauscha (Saxony, Germany)
- Freital (Saxony, Germany)
