= Wilhelm Philipp =

German fighter ace and Knight's Cross recipient (1916–1986)

- Born: 31 January 1916; Böhla, Kingdom of Saxony, German Empire
- Died: 10 January 1986 (aged 69); Duisburg, North Rhine-Westphalia, West Germany
- Military career
- Allegiance: Nazi Germany
- Branch: Luftwaffe
- Service years: ?–1945
- Rank: Oberfeldwebel (staff sergeant)
- Units: JG 26; JG 54
- Conflicts: World War II: Eastern Front; Defence of the Reich
- Awards: Knight's Cross of the Iron Cross

Wilhelm Philipp (31 January 1916 – 10 January 1986) was a Luftwaffe ace and recipient of the Knight's Cross of the Iron Cross during World War II. The Knight's Cross of the Iron Cross, and its variants were the highest awards in the military and paramilitary forces of Nazi Germany during World War II. During his career Wilhelm Philipp was credited with 81 aerial victories in 500+ missions.

== Career ==
Philipp was born on 31 January 1916 in Böhla, present-day part of Priestewitz, at the time in the Kingdom of Saxony, part of the German Empire.

World War II in Europe began on Friday 1 September 1939 when German forces invaded Poland. On 31 October 1939, Unteroffizier Philipp joined Jagdgeschwader 26 "Schlageter" (JG 26—26th Fighter Wing), which had been named after Albert Leo Schlageter on 1 May 1939. On 27 May 1940 during the Battle of Dunkirk, II. Gruppe reported combat with Royal Air Force (RAF) Supermarine Spitfire fighters over Ostend. This encounter is not matched with British records. However, the combat may have been with Hawker Hurricane fighters from No. 17 and No. 605 Squadron. That day at 17:30, Philipp claimed a Spitfire fighter shot down over Ostend.

On 7 June 1940, Philipp was forced to bail out of his Messerschmitt Bf 109 E-3 following combat with Hurricane fighters near Dieppe.

=== At the Channel and over England ===
On 17 August 1942, his Focke-Wulf Fw 190 A-3 (Werknummer 5405—factory number) suffered engine fire resulting in an emergency landing at Ligescourt.

During the Dieppe Raid on 19 August, on II. Gruppe's second combat air patrol of the day, at 08:37, Philipp was credited with the destruction of a Spitfire southwest of Dieppe, the aircraft coming from either the United States Army Air Forces (USAAF) 31st Fighter Group or the RAF No. 350 Squadron. At 17:32, a 4. Staffel Schwarm (flight) intercepted withdrawing Allied aircraft. In this encounter, Philipp claimed a Spitfire fighter west of Dieppe for his 20th aerial victory. For his achievements to date, Philipp was awarded the Honor Goblet of the Luftwaffe (Ehrenpokal der Luftwaffe) on 24 August.

In November 1942, Philipp was transferred to Jagdgeschwader 54 (JG 54—54th Fighter Wing) which was fighting on the Eastern Front.

=== War against the Soviet Union ===
Philipp claimed his first aerial victory on the Eastern Front on 15 January 1943. He had been assigned to 3. Staffel of JG 54 which at the time was commanded by Hauptmann Gerhard Koall. The Staffel was subordinated to I. Gruppe of JG 54 headed by Hauptmann Hans Philipp and was based at Krasnogvardeysk, present-day Gatchina. The Gruppe supported German forces of Army Group North fighting against the Soviet Operation Iskra which aimed to break the Wehrmacht's siege of Leningrad. On 15 January, Philipp was credited with shooting down a Lavochkin La-5 fighter.

On 22 February, his Fw 190 A-4 suffered engine failure resulting in a forced landing at Krasnogvardeysk. On 7 September, Philipp was wounded in combat when his Fw 190 A-6 (Werknummer 550501—factory number) was shot up by Yakovlev Yak-9 fighters resulting in an emergency landing.

== Summary of career ==
=== Aerial victory claims ===
According to US historian David T. Zabecki, Philipp was credited with 81 aerial victories. Spick also lists him with 81 aerial victories claimed in over 500 combat missions. Of his 81 aerial victories, 22 were claimed during the Battle of France and Battle of Britain, 55 on the Eastern Front, and four on the Western Front. Mathews and Foreman, authors of Luftwaffe Aces — Biographies and Victory Claims, researched the German Federal Archives and state that he claimed at least 79 claims. This figure includes 54 claims on the Eastern Front, and over 24 claims on the Western Front.

Victory claims were logged to a map-reference (PQ = Planquadrat), for example "PQ 10243". The Luftwaffe grid map (Jägermeldenetz) covered all of Europe, western Russia and North Africa and was composed of rectangles measuring 15 minutes of latitude by 30 minutes of longitude, an area of about 360 square miles (930 km^{2}). These sectors were then subdivided into 36 smaller units to give a location area 3 km × 4 km (1.9 mi × 2.5 mi) in size.

Chronicle of aerial victories
This and the ? (question mark) indicates information discrepancies listed by Caldwell, Prien, Stemmer, Rodeike, Bock, Mathews and Foreman.
Claim	Date	Time	Type	Location	Claim	Date	Time	Type	Location
– 4. Staffel of Jagdgeschwader 26 "Schlageter" – Battle of France — 10 May – 25 June 1940
1	27 May 1940	17:30	Spitfire	Ostend	3	29 May 1940	18:45	Spitfire	Dover
2	28 May 1940	12:30	Spitfire	east-southeast of Dover; English Channel	4	7 June 1940	19:30	Hurricane	east of Dieppe
– 4. Staffel of Jagdgeschwader 26 "Schlageter" – Action at the Channel and over England — 26 June 1940 – 21 June 1941
5	16 August 1940	14:06? (Note: According to Mathews and Foreman claimed at 14:00.)	Spitfire	Dover west of Dover	7	8 November 1940	17:40	Spitfire	Tonbridge
6	22 August 1940	20:05	Spitfire	Dover north-northeast of Dover	8	5 February 1941	14:15	Spitfire	Neufchâtel
– 2. Ergänzungsjagdgruppe of Jagdgeschwader 26 "Schlageter" – Western Front — 22 June – 31 December 1941
9	12 August 1941	—	Blenheim		10	12 August 1941	—	Blenheim	
– 4. Staffel of Jagdgeschwader 26 "Schlageter" – On the Western Front — 1 January – November 1942
11	9 March 1942	16:45	Spitfire	Boulogne-sur-Mer	17	31 July 1942	15:13	Spitfire	west of Berck
12	17 May 1942	11:37	Spitfire	3 km (1.9 mi) northeast of Calais	18	17 August 1942	19:06	Spitfire	west of Dieppe
13	2 June 1942	11:05	Spitfire	middle of the English Channel, west of Berck; Bay du Somme, Berck-sur-Mer	19	19 August 1942	08:37	Spitfire	southwest of Dieppe
14	8 June 1942	13:58	Spitfire	west-northwest of Dunkirk	20	19 August 1942	17:32	Spitfire	west of Dieppe
15	13 July 1942	15:10	Spitfire	middle of the English Channel	21	24 August 1942	17:35	Spitfire	northwest of Fécamp; 25 km (16 mi) northwest of Fécamp
16	26 July 1942	13:47	Spitfire	off the English Coast	22	29 August 1942	12:53	Mosquito	southeast of Hastings; 15–20 km (9.3–12.4 mi) southeast of Hastings
– 3. Staffel of Jagdgeschwader 54 – Eastern Front — November 1942 – 3 February 1943
23	15 January 1943	09:37	La-5	PQ 10243; 25 km (16 mi) east-southeast of Shlisselburg	26	23 January 1943	14:10	Il-2	PQ 00234; 10 km (6.2 mi) west of Shlisselburg
24	15 January 1943	12:40	Yak-4	PQ 00282; 20 km (12 mi) west of Mga	27	24 January 1943	09:15	MiG-3	PQ 00264
25	23 January 1943	13:51	Il-2	PQ 10151 southeast of Shlisselburg	28	24 January 1943	09:40	Yak-1	PQ 10183 east of Mga
– 3. Staffel of Jagdgeschwader 54 – Eastern Front — 4 February – 7 September 1943
29	10 February 1943	12:41	LaGG-3	PQ 36 Ost 00412; 10 km (6.2 mi) east of Pushkin	46	23 August 1943	07:39	Pe-2	PQ 35 Ost 40292; 10 km (6.2 mi) southwest of Shlisselburg
30	10 February 1943	15:14	La-5	PQ 36 Ost 00414; 10 km (6.2 mi) east of Pushkin	47	25 August 1943	05:15	LaGG-3	PQ 35 Ost 41691
31	14 February 1943	15:10? (Note: According to Mathews and Foreman claimed at 15:11.)	Il-2	PQ 36 Ost 00254; Pushkin-Mga	48	26 August 1943	18:20	La-5	PQ 35 Ost 51741; 20 km (12 mi) southeast of Okhtyrka
32	14 February 1943	15:14	LaGG-3	PQ 36 Ost 00283; 20 km (12 mi) west of Mga	49	28 August 1943	11:36	Boston	PQ 35 Ost 43674; 15 km (9.3 mi) northeast of Sevsk
33	19 February 1943	07:55	Il-2	PQ 36 Ost 10414; 40 km (25 mi) northeast of Lyuban	50	29 August 1943	06:43	P-39	PQ 35 Ost 43681; 20 km (12 mi) northeast of Sevsk
34	19 February 1943	07:58	LaGG-3	PQ 36 Ost 10533; 10 km (6.2 mi) northeast of Lyuban	51	1 September 1943	18:08	Il-2	PQ 35 Ost 25454; 25 km (16 mi) northwest of Yelnya
35	21 February 1943	11:45	Il-2	PQ 36 Ost 10473; 25 km (16 mi) northeast of Lyuban	52	1 September 1943	18:10	Il-2	PQ 35 Ost 25424; 25 km (16 mi) northwest of Yelnya
36	21 February 1943	11:47	Il-2	PQ 36 Ost 10442; 30 km (19 mi) southeast of Mga	53	1 September 1943	18:12	Il-2	PQ 35 Ost 25424; 25 km (16 mi) northwest of Yelnya
37	23 February 1943	10:02? (Note: According to Mathews and Foreman claimed at 10:03.)	Il-2	PQ 36 Ost 10144 south of Shlisselburg	54	1 September 1943	18:14	Il-2	PQ 35 Ost 25452; 25 km (16 mi) northwest of Yelnya
38	23 February 1943	10:05	Il-2	PQ 36 Ost 10142 south of Shlisselburg	55	2 September 1943	17:20	Pe-2	PQ 35 Ost 25732; 20 km (12 mi) south of Schatalowka
39	7 March 1943	11:13? (Note: According to Mathews and Foreman claimed at 11:03.)	Il-2	PQ 35 Ost 18382; 45 km (28 mi) north of Kholm	56	4 September 1943	06:40	Boston	northeast of Roslavl
40	15 March 1943	09:23	Pe-2	PQ 35 Ost 19734; 20 km (12 mi) north of Staraya Russa	57	4 September 1943	10:55	LaGG-3	PQ 35 Ost 26674; 25 km (16 mi) northeast of Moschna
41	15 March 1943	09:24	LaGG-3	PQ 35 Ost 19734; Lake Ilmen	58	5 September 1943	11:18	Il-2	PQ 35 Ost 25463; 20 km (12 mi) west of Yelnya
42	15 March 1943	09:29	LaGG-3	PQ 35 Ost 19683; 30 km (19 mi) southeast of Novgorod	59	5 September 1943	11:20	Il-2	PQ 35 Ost 35341; 5 km (3.1 mi) southwest of Yelnya
43? (Note: This claim is not listed by Mathews and Foreman.)	15 March 1943	16:13	La-5	PQ 35 Ost 18252	60	5 September 1943	11:21	Il-2	PQ 35 Ost 25462; 20 km (12 mi) west of Yelnya
44	20 March 1943	09:07	MiG-3	PQ 36 Ost 00442; 10 km (6.2 mi) southeast of Slutsk	61	6 September 1943	14:03	Yak-9	PQ 35 Ost 26653; 40 km (25 mi) north of Yartsevo
45	20 March 1943	09:10	P-40	PQ 36 Ost 00274; 15 km (9.3 mi) northeast of Pushkin					

=== Awards ===
- Iron Cross (1939) 2nd and 1st Class
- Honor Goblet of the Luftwaffe on 24 August 1942 as Oberfeldwebel and pilot
- German Cross in Gold on 27 October 1942 as Oberfeldwebel in the 4./Jagdgeschwader 26
- Knight's Cross of the Iron Cross on 26 March 1944 as Oberfeldwebel and pilot in the 3./Jagdgeschwader 54 (Note: According to Scherzer as pilot in the I./Jagdgeschwader 54.)
