= Johann Samuel Arnhold =

German painter

Johann Samuel Arnhold (22 December 1766 – 1 January 1828) was a German painter.

He was born at Heinitz (now part of Käbschütztal), a village near Meissen, and studied in the Art School of the Porcelain factory of Meissen, of which he subsequently became professor. He was also court painter in Dresden. He painted in oil and water-colours, and on porcelain and enamel. His pictures sometimes represented landscapes and hunting scenes, but he is chiefly famous for his fruit and flower pieces.

== See also ==
- List of German painters
