= Umbrellawort =

Umbrellawort is a common name for several flowering plants and may refer to:

- Mirabilis, a genus of plants in the family Nyctaginaceae
- Tauschia, a genus of flowering plants in the carrot family
