= Oelsnitz =

Olsnitz, Ölsnitz or Oelsnitz may refer to:

- Olsnitz, German name for Murska Sobota, a city in northeastern Slovenia
- Oelsnitz, Vogtland, in the Vogtlandkreis district, Saxony, Germany
- Oelsnitz, Erzgebirge, in the district of Stollberg, Saxony, Germany
- Oelsnitz, a village in Lampertswalde municipality, Meißen district, Saxony, Germany
- Kreis Oelsnitz, a former Landkreis in Bezirk Karl-Marx-Stadt, East Germany (1952–1996)
