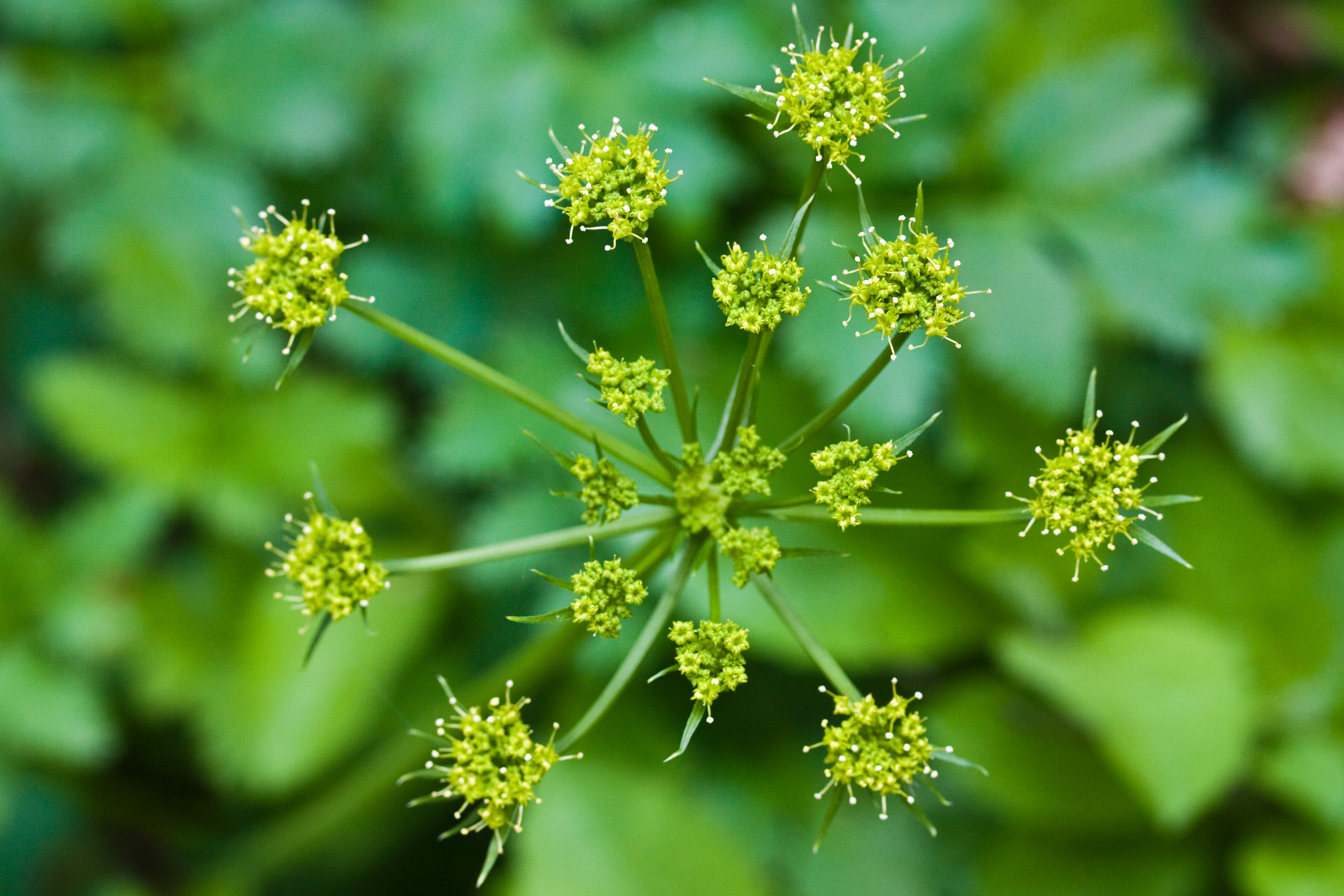

Scientific classification
- Kingdom: Plantae
- Clade: Tracheophytes
- Clade: Angiosperms
- Clade: Eudicots
- Clade: Asterids
- Order: Apiales
- Family: Apiaceae
- Genus: Tauschia
- Species: T. hartwegii

Binomial name
- Tauschia hartwegii (A.Gray) J.F.Macbr.

= Tauschia hartwegii =

Species of plant

Tauschia hartwegii is a species of flowering plant in the carrot family known by the common name Hartweg's umbrellawort. It is endemic to California, where it is known from the Sierra Nevada foothills and some of the Central Coast Ranges. Its habitat includes coniferous woodlands and chaparral. It is a perennial herb growing 30 centimeters to one meter tall. It is coated in short, rough hairs. The leaves have blades which are divided into oval leaflets with serrated edges and borne on long petioles. The inflorescence is a compound umbel of yellow flowers with up to 30 unequal rays measuring 2 to 12 centimeters long each. The fruit is somewhat rounded in shape, ribbed, and under a centimeter long.
