= Geiswiller =

Commune in Bas-Rhin, France

Geiswiller Gäiswiller
- Part of Geiswiller-Zœbersdorf
- Coat of arms
- Location of Geiswiller
- Location within France Location within Grand Est
- Coordinates: 48°47′19″N 7°30′14″E
- Country: France
- Region: Grand Est
- Department: Bas-Rhin
- Arrondissement: Saverne
- Canton: Bouxwiller
- Commune: Geiswiller-Zœbersdorf
- Area^{1}: 3.2 km^{2} (1.2 sq mi)
- Highest elevation: 253 m (830 ft)
- Lowest elevation: 195 m (640 ft)
- Population (2022): 215
  - Density: 67/km^{2} (170/sq mi)
- Time zone: UTC+01:00 (CET)
  - Summer (DST): UTC+02:00 (CEST)
- Postal code: 67270
- ^{1} French Land Register data, which excludes lakes, ponds, glaciers > 1 km^{2} (0.386 sq mi or 247 acres) and river estuaries.

Geiswiller (French pronunciation: [ɡaisvilɛʁ]; German: Geisweiler; Alsatian: Gäiswiller) is a former commune in the Bas-Rhin department in Grand Est in north-eastern France. On 1 January 2018, it was merged into the new commune of Geiswiller-Zœbersdorf.

== See also ==
- Communes of the Bas-Rhin department
