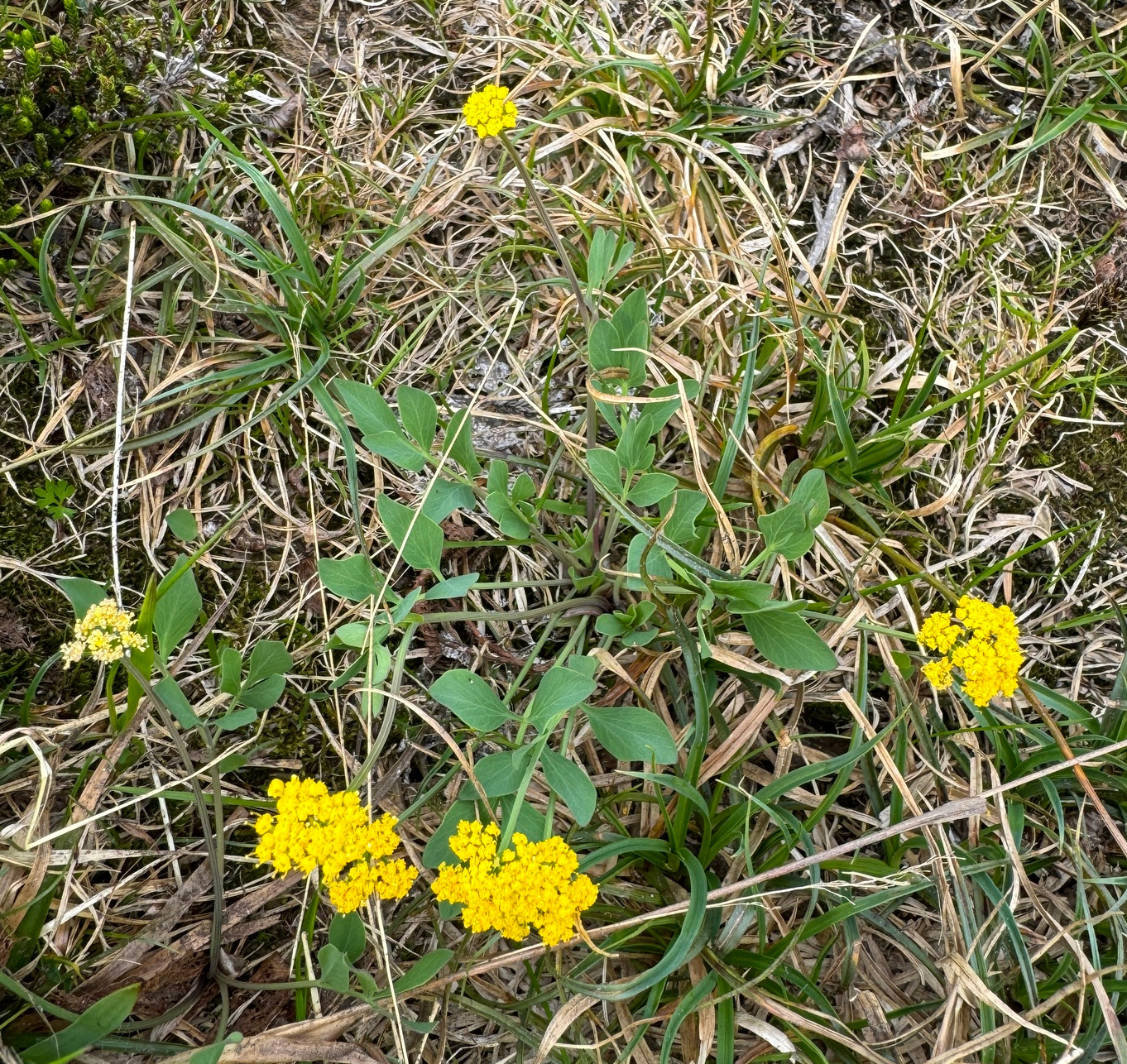

Scientific classification
- Kingdom: Plantae
- Clade: Embryophytes
- Clade: Tracheophytes
- Clade: Angiosperms
- Clade: Eudicots
- Clade: Asterids
- Order: Apiales
- Family: Apiaceae
- Genus: Tauschia
- Species: T. stricklandii

Binomial name
- Tauschia stricklandii (J.M.Coult. & Rose) Mathias & Constance

Synonyms
- Hesperogenia stricklandii J.M.Coult. & Rose; Zizia stricklandii (J.M.Coult. & Rose) Koso-Pol.

= Tauschia stricklandii =

Species of plant

Tauschia stricklandii is a perennial herb in the Apiaceae family with the common name Strickland's umbrella-wort. It is a narrow endemic that is found mostly in meadows around Mount Rainier.

== Description ==
Tauschia stricklandii is a glabrous herb usually less than 30 cm (12 in) tall. A small number of compound leaves arise from the base and each is divided into leaflet segments that are lanceolate to elliptic and up to 3 cm (1.2 in) long and 1 cm (0.4 in) wide. There are sometimes much reduced cauline leaves low on the flower stem. The tiny yellow flowers are held well above the foliage in a compound umbel that arises from the base of the plant. The flowers have yellow anthers and are very similar in appearance to those of Lomatium species. The fruit is a slightly elongated sphere that acquires prominent ridges as it matures and is 2 to 3 mm (0.08 to 0.12 in) long.

== Range and habitat ==
Tauschia stricklandii is abundant in certain seasonally wet meadows around Mount Rainier in Washington state, notably in Grand Park and Spray Park. It is also found in a few other Mount Rainier meadows and there are apparently disjunct populations in a few isolated meadows in northern and western Oregon.

== Taxonomy ==
The taxonomy of this genus is unsettled, with many species having been transferred to Lomatium, with likely additional changes to be made following DNA sequence analysis.

== Gallery ==
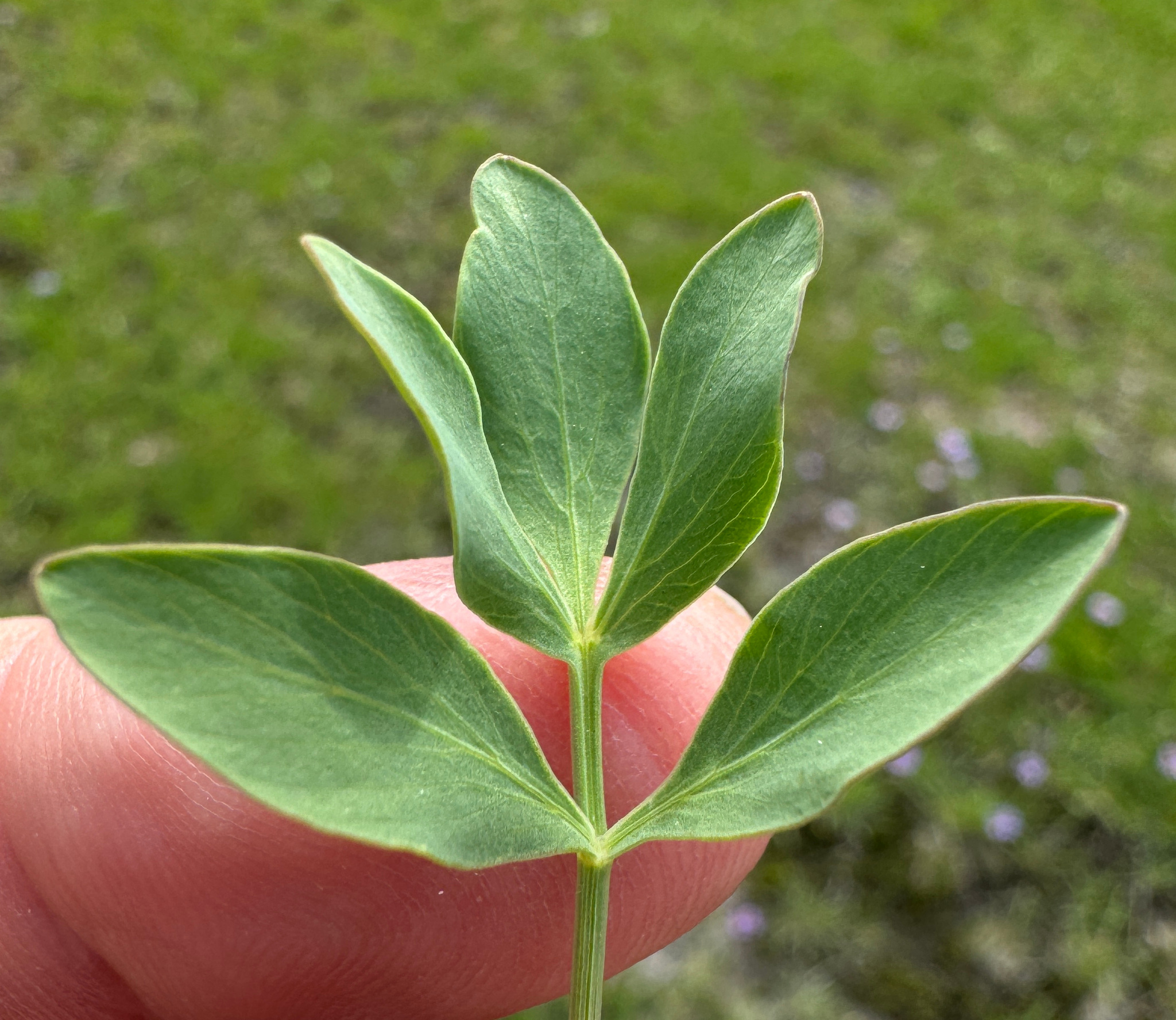
Leaf

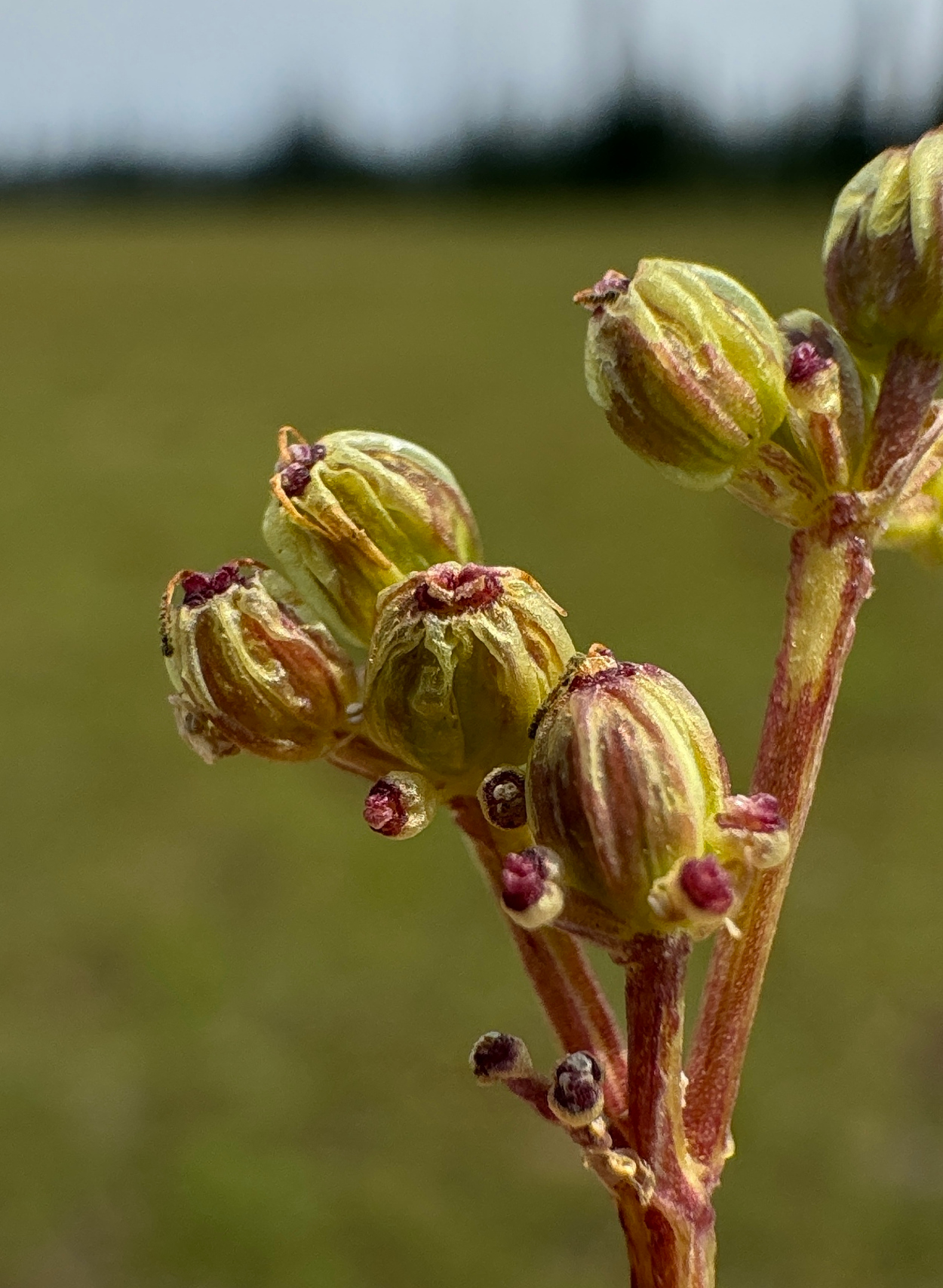
Fruits
