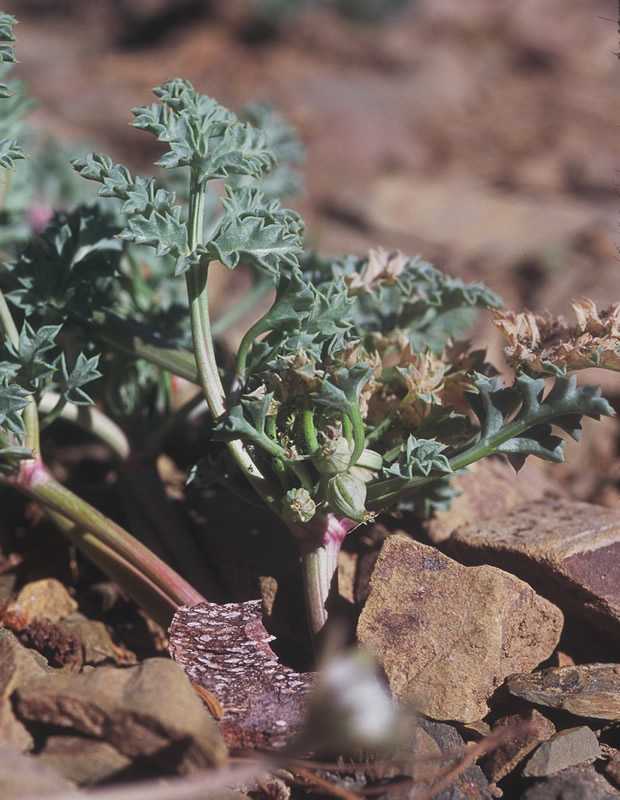

Conservation status
- Imperiled (NatureServe)

Scientific classification
- Kingdom: Plantae
- Clade: Tracheophytes
- Clade: Angiosperms
- Clade: Eudicots
- Clade: Asterids
- Order: Apiales
- Family: Apiaceae
- Genus: Tauschia
- Species: T. howellii

Binomial name
- Tauschia howellii (J.M.Coult. & Rose) J.F.Macbr.

= Tauschia howellii =

Species of plant

Tauschia howellii is a rare species of flowering plant in the carrot family known by the common names Howell's umbrellawort and Howell's tauschia. It is endemic to the Klamath Mountains of far southern Oregon and far northern California, where it is limited to nine occurrences in the Siskiyou Mountains. It grows in mountain forests on gravelly granite soils, often among stands of Shasta red fir (Abies magnifica var. shastensis). Despite its rarity it is stable and not considered very endangered. It is a perennial herb growing 30 to 80 centimeters tall. It is hairless in texture. The thick leaves have blades which are divided into leaflets large, sharp teeth and edges curved up, and borne on long petioles. The short inflorescence is a compound umbel of yellow flowers on a few short rays. The fruit is oblong, ribbed, and just a few millimeters long.
