= Tauschia parishii =

Scientific classification
- Kingdom: Plantae
- Clade: Tracheophytes
- Clade: Angiosperms
- Clade: Eudicots
- Clade: Asterids
- Order: Apiales
- Family: Apiaceae
- Genus: Tauschia
- Species: T. parishii

Binomial name
- Tauschia parishii (J.M.Coult. & Rose) J.F.Macbr.

Species of plant

Tauschia parishii is a species of flowering plant in the carrot family known by the common name Parish's umbrellawort. It is endemic to California.

== Distribution ==
The plant occurs in several mountain ranges, including the Sierra Nevada, White and Inyo Mountains, the Tehachapi Mountains, the San Gabriel and San Bernardino Mountains, the western Transverse Ranges, and the San Jacinto Mountains and other northern Peninsular Ranges.

Its habitats include: chaparral, Yellow pine forest, Red fir forest, and Pinyon-juniper woodland.

== Description ==
Tauschia parishii is a low-lying perennial herb growing 10 to 40 centimeters tall. The leaves have blades which are divided into elongated leaflets, which are subdivided into toothed or lobed segments.

The inflorescence is a compound umbel of yellow flowers with 12 to 18 rays each a few centimeters long.

The fruit is oblong with prominent ribs and measures between one half and one centimeter long.
