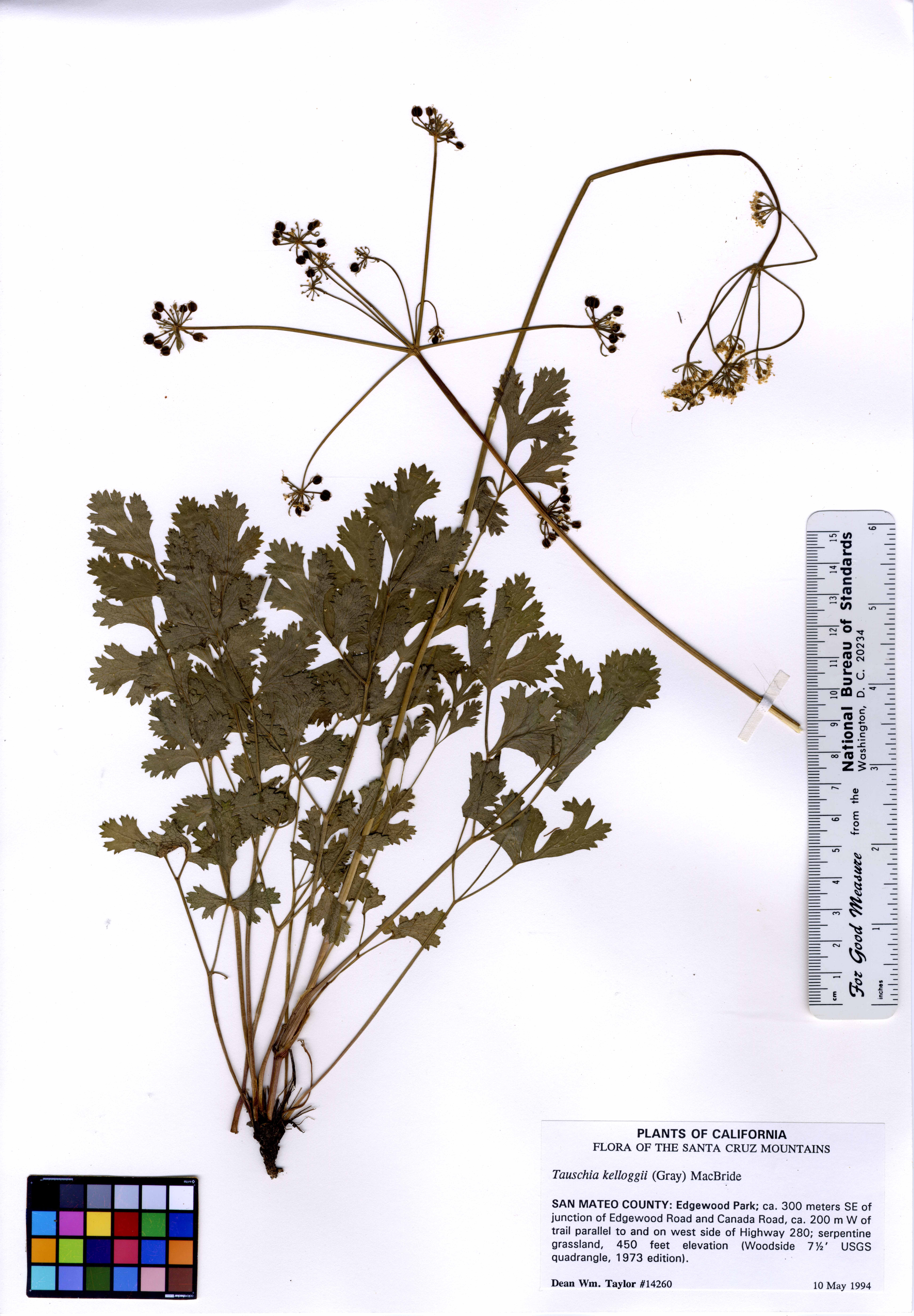

Conservation status
- Secure (NatureServe)

Scientific classification
- Kingdom: Plantae
- Clade: Tracheophytes
- Clade: Angiosperms
- Clade: Eudicots
- Clade: Asterids
- Order: Apiales
- Family: Apiaceae
- Genus: Tauschia
- Species: T. kelloggii

Binomial name
- Tauschia kelloggii (A.Gray) J.F.Macbr.

= Tauschia kelloggii =

Species of plant

Tauschia kelloggii is a species of flowering plant in the carrot family known by the common name Kellogg's umbrellawort. It is native to the mountains of Oregon and the northern half of California, where it grows in chaparral, woodlands, forest, and other types of habitat. It is a perennial herb growing up to 70 centimeters tall. The leaves have blades which are divided into toothed or serrated leaflets, and sometimes subdivided further. The inflorescence is a compound umbel of yellow flowers with 10 to 20 rays measuring 2 to 12 centimeters long each. The fruit is somewhat rounded in shape, ribbed, and up to half a centimeter long.
