= Tauschia glauca =

Conservation status
- Apparently Secure (NatureServe)

Scientific classification
- Kingdom: Plantae
- Clade: Tracheophytes
- Clade: Angiosperms
- Clade: Eudicots
- Clade: Asterids
- Order: Apiales
- Family: Apiaceae
- Genus: Tauschia
- Species: T. glauca

Binomial name
- Tauschia glauca (J.M.Coult. & Rose) Mathias & Constance

Species of plant

Tauschia glauca is a species of flowering plant in the carrot family known by the common name glaucous umbrellawort, or glaucous tauschia. It is native to the forests of Oregon and northern California, where it can often be found on serpentine soils. It is a perennial herb growing 20 to 40 centimeters tall. The leaves have blades which are divided into three-lobed leaflets and borne on long, thin petioles. The inflorescence is a compound umbel of yellow flowers with up to 12 unequal rays measuring up to 6 centimeters long each. The fruit is rounded, ribbed, and only 2 or 3 millimeters long.
