= Geiswiller-Zœbersdorf =

- Commune
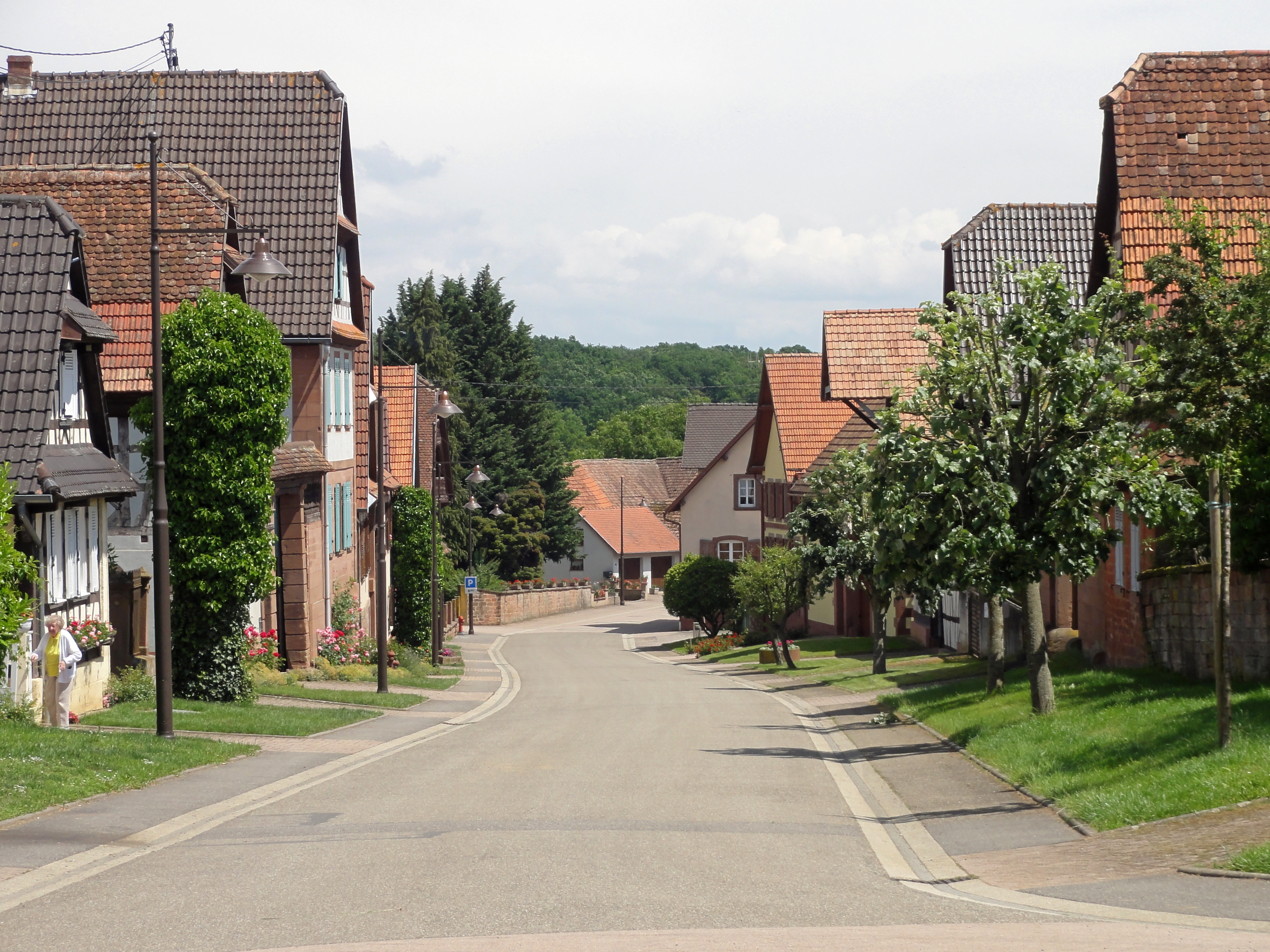
- Rue Principale (Geiswiller)

- Coat of arms
- Location of Geiswiller-Zœbersdorf
- Location within France Location within Grand Est
- Coordinates: 48°47′19″N 7°30′14″E
- Country: France
- Region: Grand Est
- Department: Bas-Rhin
- Arrondissement: Saverne
- Canton: Bouxwiller
- Intercommunality: C.C. du Pays de la Zorn

Government
  - Mayor (2020–2026): Jean-Georges Hammann
- Area^{1}: 5.05 km^{2} (1.95 sq mi)
- Population (2023): 383
  - Density: 75.8/km^{2} (196/sq mi)
- Time zone: UTC+01:00 (CET)
  - Summer (DST): UTC+02:00 (CEST)
- INSEE/Postal code: 67153 /67270
- ^{1} French Land Register data, which excludes lakes, ponds, glaciers > 1 km^{2} (0.386 sq mi or 247 acres) and river estuaries.

Geiswiller-Zœbersdorf is a commune in the department of Bas-Rhin, northeastern France. The municipality was established on 1 January 2018 by merger of the former communes of Geiswiller (the seat) and Zœbersdorf.

== See also ==
- Communes of the Bas-Rhin department
