= Weißig am Raschütz =

- Ortsteil of Lampertswalde
- Interactive map of Weißig am Raschütz
- Location within Germany Location within Saxony
- Coordinates: 51°21′N 13°39′E
- Country: Germany
- State: Saxony
- District: Meißen
- Municipality: Lampertswalde
- Subdivisions: 4

Area
  - Total: 34.46 km^{2} (13.31 sq mi)
- Elevation: 152 m (499 ft)

Population (2010-12-31)
  - Total: 915
  - Density: 26.6/km^{2} (68.8/sq mi)
- Time zone: UTC+01:00 (CET)
  - Summer (DST): UTC+02:00 (CEST)
- Postal codes: 01561
- Dialling codes: 035248
- Vehicle registration: MEI, GRH, RG, RIE

Weißig am Raschütz is a former municipality in the district of Meißen, in Saxony, Germany. With effect from 1 January 2012, it has been incorporated into the municipality of Lampertswalde.

== Municipality subdivisions ==
Weißig am Raschütz includes the following subdivisions:

- Blochwitz
- Brößnitz
- Oelsnitz-Niegeroda
