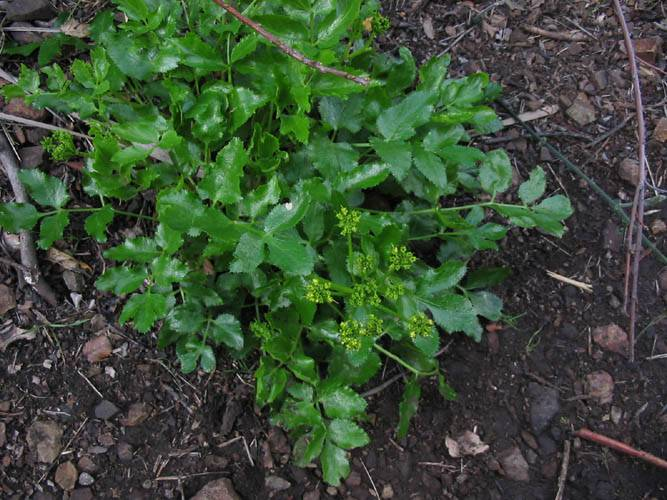

Conservation status
- Apparently Secure (NatureServe)

Scientific classification
- Kingdom: Plantae
- Clade: Embryophytes
- Clade: Tracheophytes
- Clade: Spermatophytes
- Clade: Angiosperms
- Clade: Eudicots
- Clade: Asterids
- Order: Apiales
- Family: Apiaceae
- Genus: Tauschia
- Species: T. arguta

Binomial name
- Tauschia arguta (Torr. & A.Gray) J.F.Macbr.

= Tauschia arguta =

Species of plant

Tauschia arguta is a species of flowering plant in the carrot family known by the common name southern umbrellawort. It is native to the mountains of southern California and Baja California, where it grows in local habitat types such as woodlands and chaparral.

== Description ==
Tauschia arguta is a perennial herb growing 30 to 70 centimeters tall. The leaves have blades which are divided into several toothed leaflets and borne on long petioles. The inflorescence is a compound umbel of yellow flowers with up to 25 rays measuring 2 to 12 centimeters long each. The fruit is almost a centimeter long and has deep longitudinal ribs.
