= Thiendorf =

- Municipality
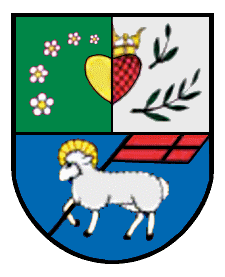
- Coat of arms

- Location of Thiendorf within Meißen district
- Interactive map of Thiendorf
- Location within Germany Location within Saxony
- Coordinates: 51°18′N 13°45′E
- Country: Germany
- State: Saxony
- District: Meißen
- Subdivisions: 14

Government
  - Mayor (2021–28): Dirk Mocker

Area
  - Total: 74.48 km^{2} (28.76 sq mi)
- Elevation: 153 m (502 ft)

Population (2025-12-31)
  - Total: 3,793
  - Density: 50.93/km^{2} (131.9/sq mi)
- Time zone: UTC+01:00 (CET)
  - Summer (DST): UTC+02:00 (CEST)
- Postal codes: 01561
- Dialling codes: 035248 (Sacka and Stölpchen: 035240)
- Vehicle registration: MEI, GRH, RG, RIE
- Website: www.thiendorf.de

Thiendorf (German pronunciation: [ˈtiːndɔʁf]) is a municipality in the district of Meißen, in Saxony, Germany. It is located near Dresden.

== Municipality subdivisions ==
On 1 January 2016, the former municipality Tauscha became part of Thiendorf. Thiendorf includes the following subdivisions (the former subdivisions of Tauscha are marked with a star):

- Dobra *
- Kleinnaundorf *
- Lötzschen
- Lüttichau
- Lüttichau/Anbau
- Naundorf bei Ortrand
- Ponickau
- Sacka
- Stölpchen
- Tauscha *
- Thiendorf
- Welxande
- Würschnitz *
- Zschorna *
