= Zœbersdorf =

Commune in Bas-Rhin department, France

- Part of Geiswiller-Zœbersdorf
- Coat of arms
- Location of Zœbersdorf
- Location within France Location within Grand Est
- Coordinates: 48°47′39″N 7°31′30″E
- Country: France
- Region: Grand Est
- Department: Bas-Rhin
- Arrondissement: Saverne
- Canton: Bouxwiller
- Commune: Geiswiller-Zœbersdorf
- Area^{1}: 1.85 km^{2} (0.71 sq mi)
- Elevation: 220 m (720 ft)
- Highest elevation: 228 m (748 ft)
- Lowest elevation: 176 m (577 ft)
- Population (2021): 173
  - Density: 93.5/km^{2} (242/sq mi)
- Time zone: UTC+01:00 (CET)
  - Summer (DST): UTC+02:00 (CEST)
- Postal code: 67270
- ^{1} French Land Register data, which excludes lakes, ponds, glaciers > 1 km^{2} (0.386 sq mi or 247 acres) and river estuaries.

Zœbersdorf (German: Zöbersdorf, Alsatian: Zäwerschdorf) is a former commune in the Bas-Rhin department in Grand Est in north-eastern France. On 1 January 2018, it was merged into the new commune of Geiswiller-Zœbersdorf. Most of the houses lie along a single street. Zœbersdorf has no direct connections to routes départementales. The surrounding land is primarily utilized for agriculture.

== Population ==
Historical population
Year	Pop.	±% p.a.
2006	181	—
2011	173	−0.90%
2015	178	+0.71%
2021	173	−0.47%
Source: INSEE

== See also ==
- Communes of the Bas-Rhin department
