= Zeithain =

- Municipality
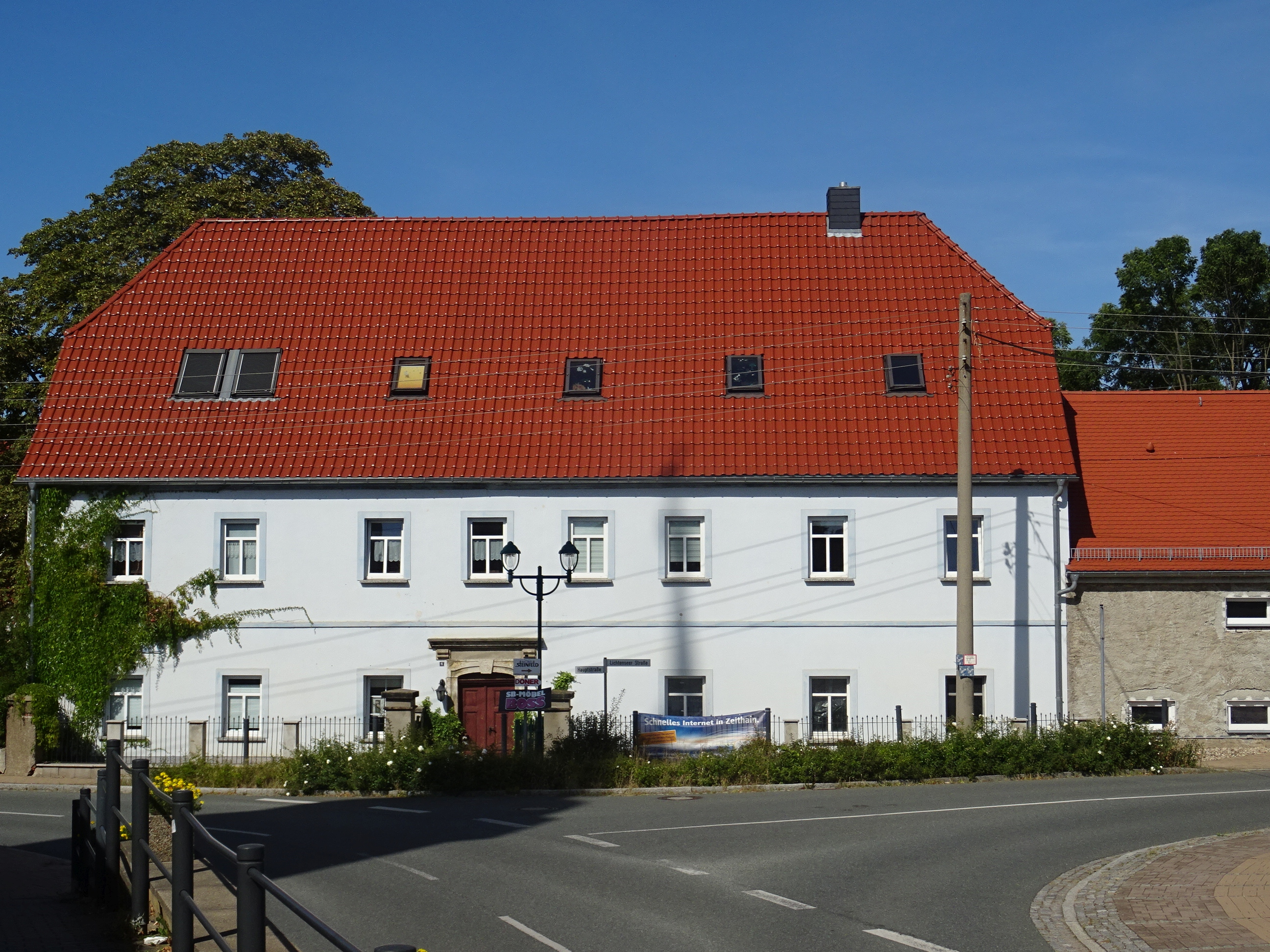

- Coat of arms

- Location of Zeithain within Meißen district
- Interactive map of Zeithain
- Location within Germany Location within Saxony
- Coordinates: 51°20′N 13°21′E
- Country: Germany
- State: Saxony
- District: Meißen
- Subdivisions: 11

Government
  - Mayor (2021–28): Mirko Pollmer

Area
  - Total: 81.49 km^{2} (31.46 sq mi)
- Elevation: 98 m (322 ft)

Population (2025-12-31)
  - Total: 5,527
  - Density: 67.82/km^{2} (175.7/sq mi)
- Time zone: UTC+01:00 (CET)
  - Summer (DST): UTC+02:00 (CEST)
- Postal codes: 01619
- Dialling codes: 03525
- Vehicle registration: MEI, GRH, RG, RIE
- Website: www.zeithain.de

Zeithain is a municipality in the district of Meißen, in Saxony, in eastern Germany.

== History ==
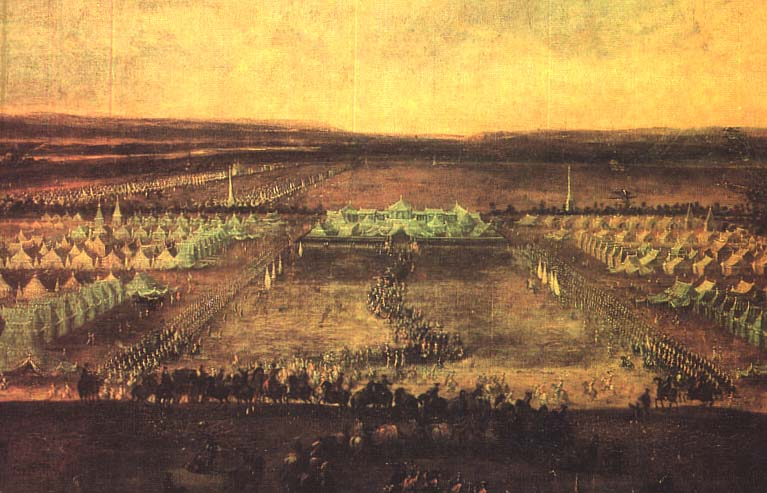
The Zeithain Encampment of June 1730, by Johann Alexander Thiele

Historically, it is known for the Zeithain Encampment (Zeithainer Zeltlager or Zeithainer Lustlager, i. e. the pleasure camp of Zeithain), which was a huge agglomeration of tents and troops, involving the army of Augustus II the Strong between the towns of Zeithain and Glaubitz. This event took place from 1 to 26 June 1730. After the conclusion of the Great Northern War, the Polish-Saxon king had his army reorganized and equipped and presented it in a large maneuver, organized by Field Marshal Count August Christoph von Wackerbarth, to the Prussian king present, Frederick William I, and invited 48 European princes with their military officers as well as envoys of the European powers. It was not only the largest troop show in Europe, proving military capabilities, it was also considered the most gigantic baroque festival of its time, the “military spectacle of the century”, with great festivities, showcasing the high level of Saxon art and culture, concluded with a 23 feet long and 10 feet wide Dresden Stollen. A five-hour fireworks display on June 24 bathed the river and the town of Riesa in bright colors. For this purpose, a "fairy palace" measuring 80 x 230 feet was built from scaffolding and canvases, opposite the specially converted Promnitz Castle on the banks of the Elbe River. At the same time, a fleet illuminated to the top of the masts, led by fire-breathing whales and dolphins, sailed past the guests gathered in front of the castle, whose glory and splendor were praised with songs of praise from the royal chapel on the main ship. Captured Ottoman state tents were also used, two of which can now be viewed in the Türckische Kammer (Turkish Chamber) in the Dresden Palace.

During World War II, in the spring of 1941, the Stalag 304/IV-H and Stalag 329 prisoner-of-war camps were established in Zeithain. Stalag 329 was relocated to Zhmerynka in August 1941, and Stalag 304 was relocated to Leuven in September 1942, and replaced by the Stalag IV-B/Z camp, a subcamp of the Stalag IV-B camp. A memorial and museum commemorate it.

The first encounter of US and Soviet troops on German soil occurred on Elbe Day, 25 April 1945, at 12 p.m. on the banks of the Elbe in the village of Lorenzkirch, Zeithain. There is a memorial stone commemorating this event.

== Municipality subdivisions ==
Zeithain includes the following subdivisions:

- Cottewitz
- Gohlis
- Jacobsthal
- Kreinitz
- Lorenzkirch
- Moritz
- Neudorf
- Promnitz
- Röderau-Bobersen
- Zschepa

== Mayor ==
In 2021, Mirko Pollmer was elected mayor.

== Gallery ==
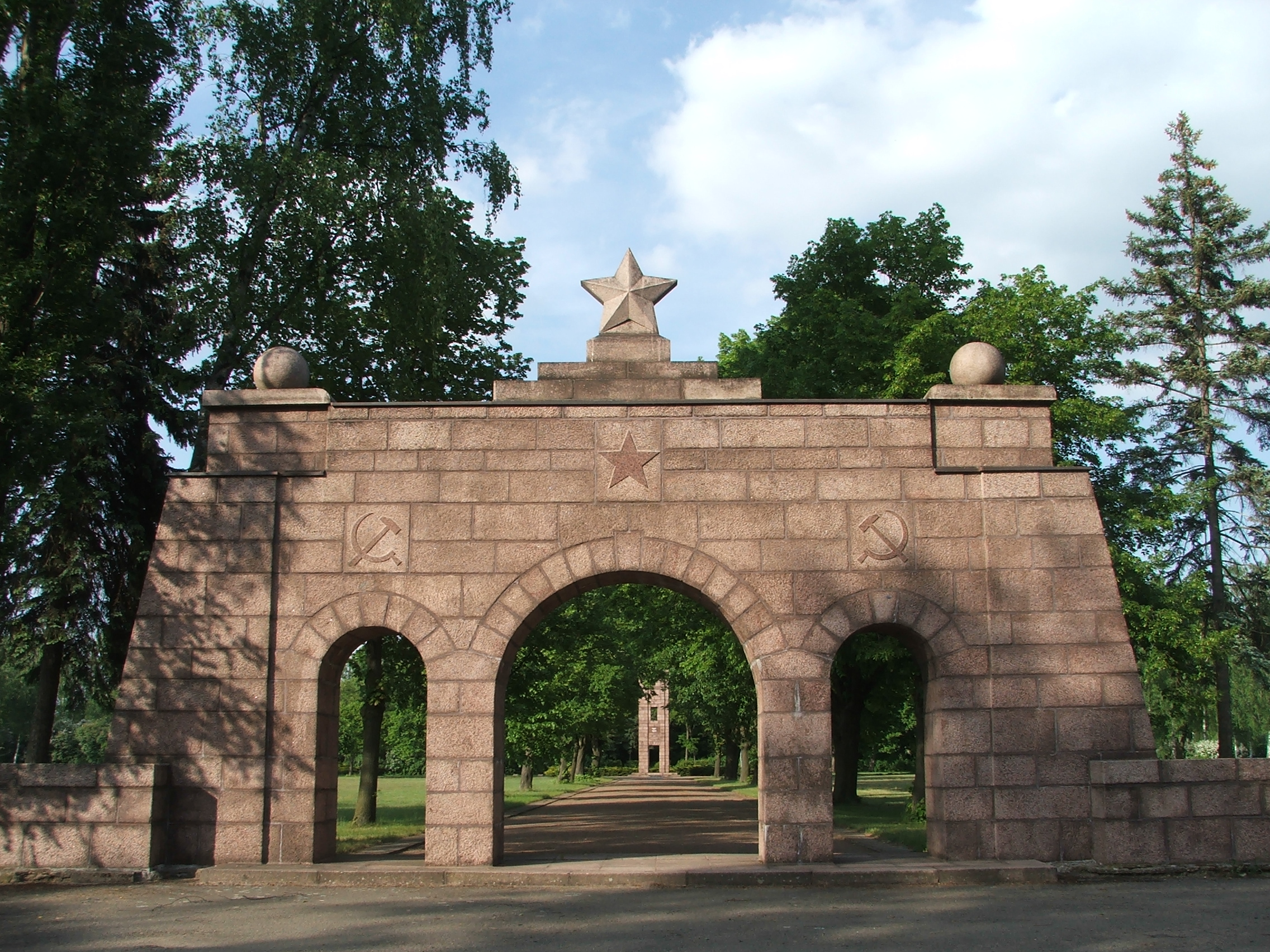
Memorial Ehrenhain, Zeithain

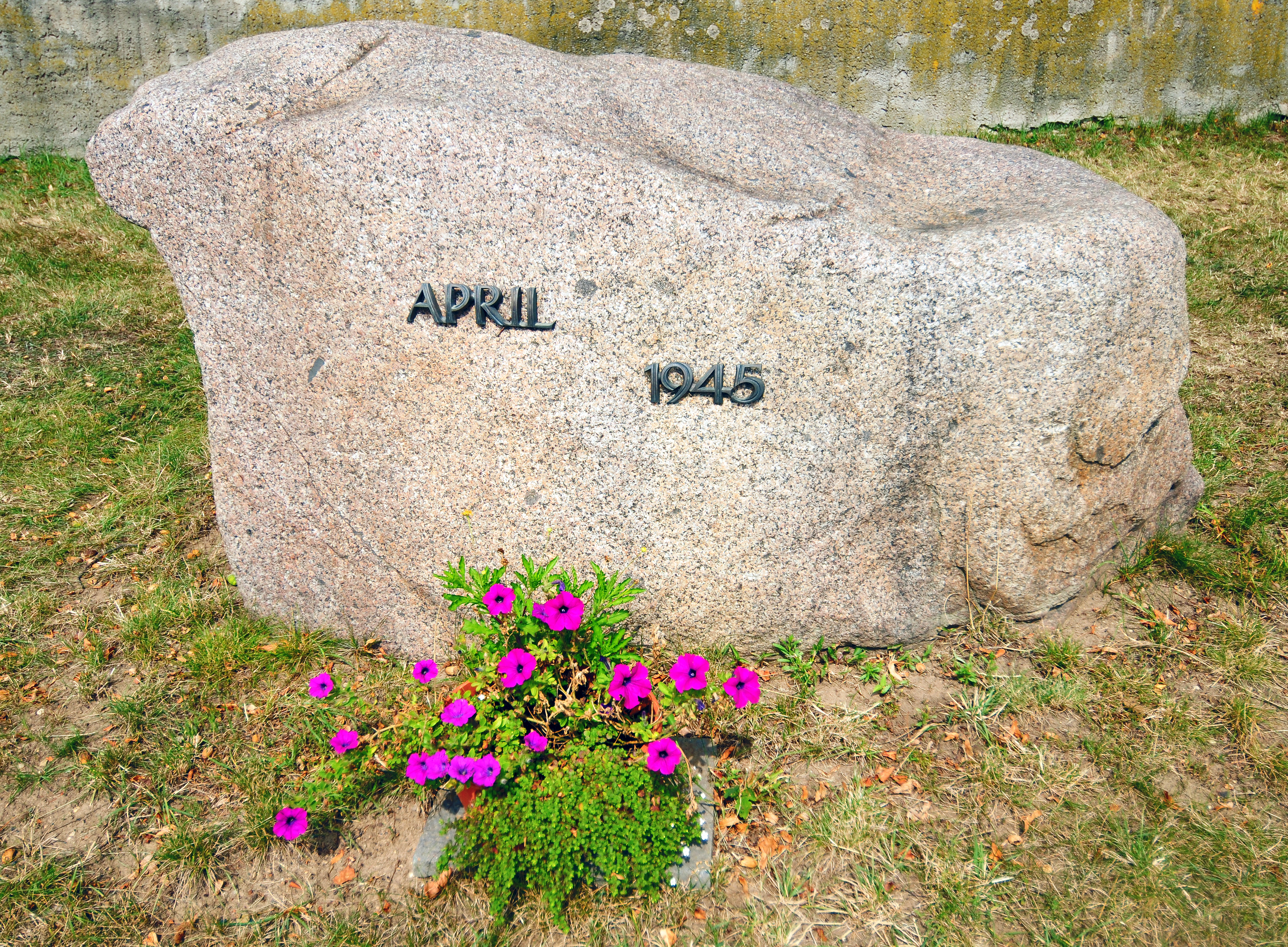
Memorial stone April 1945 in Lorenzkirch

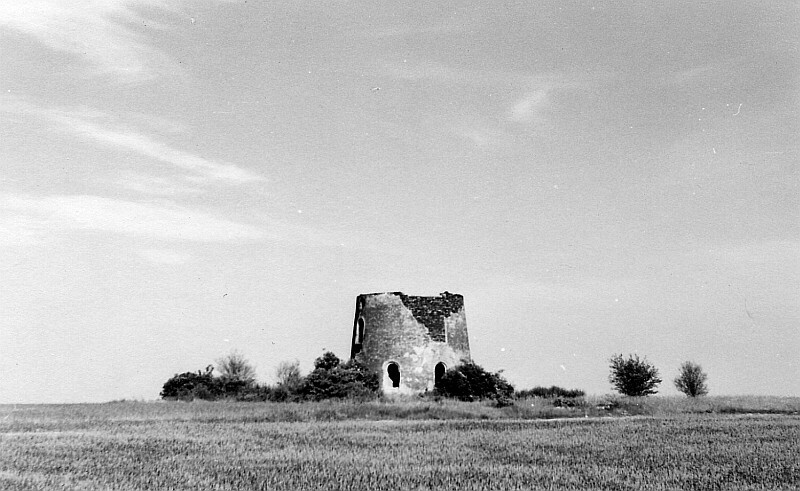
Ruin of the Holländermühle in Lorenzkirch, Zeithain

== Twin towns ==
Teningen, Germany
