= Ebersbach, Meissen =

Ebersbach
- Municipality
- Location of Ebersbach within Meißen district
- Interactive map of Ebersbach
- Location within Germany Location within Saxony
- Coordinates: 51°14′26″N 13°39′36″E
- Country: Germany
- State: Saxony
- District: Meißen
- Subdivisions: 13

Government
  - Mayor (2017–24): Falk Hentschel

Area
  - Total: 84.38 km^{2} (32.58 sq mi)
- Elevation: 238 m (781 ft)

Population (2025-12-31)
  - Total: 4,282
  - Density: 50.75/km^{2} (131.4/sq mi)
- Time zone: UTC+01:00 (CET)
  - Summer (DST): UTC+02:00 (CEST)
- Postal codes: 01561
- Dialling codes: 035208
- Vehicle registration: MEI, GRH, RG, RIE

Ebersbach (German pronunciation: [ˈeːbɐsbax]) is a municipality in the district of Meißen, in Saxony, Germany.

== Municipality subdivisions ==
Ebersbach includes the following subdivisions:

- Beiersdorf
- Bieberach
- Cunnersdorf
- Ermendorf
- Freitelsdorf
- Göhra
- Hohndorf
- Kalkreuth
- Lauterbach
- Marschau
- Naunhof
- Reinersdorf
- Rödern
