= Schönfeld, Saxony =

Schönfeld
- Municipality
- Location of Schönfeld within Meißen district
- Interactive map of Schönfeld
- Location within Germany Location within Saxony
- Coordinates: 51°17′N 13°41′E
- Country: Germany
- State: Saxony
- District: Meißen
- Subdivisions: 5

Government
  - Mayor (2022–29): Falk Lindenau

Area
  - Total: 39.14 km^{2} (15.11 sq mi)
- Elevation: 319 m (1,047 ft)

Population (2025-12-31)
  - Total: 1,678
  - Density: 42.87/km^{2} (111.0/sq mi)
- Time zone: UTC+01:00 (CET)
  - Summer (DST): UTC+02:00 (CEST)
- Postal codes: 01561
- Dialling codes: 035248
- Vehicle registration: MEI, GRH, RG, RIE

Schönfeld is a municipality in the district of Meißen, in Saxony, Germany.
