= Hirschenstein (Ore Mountains) =

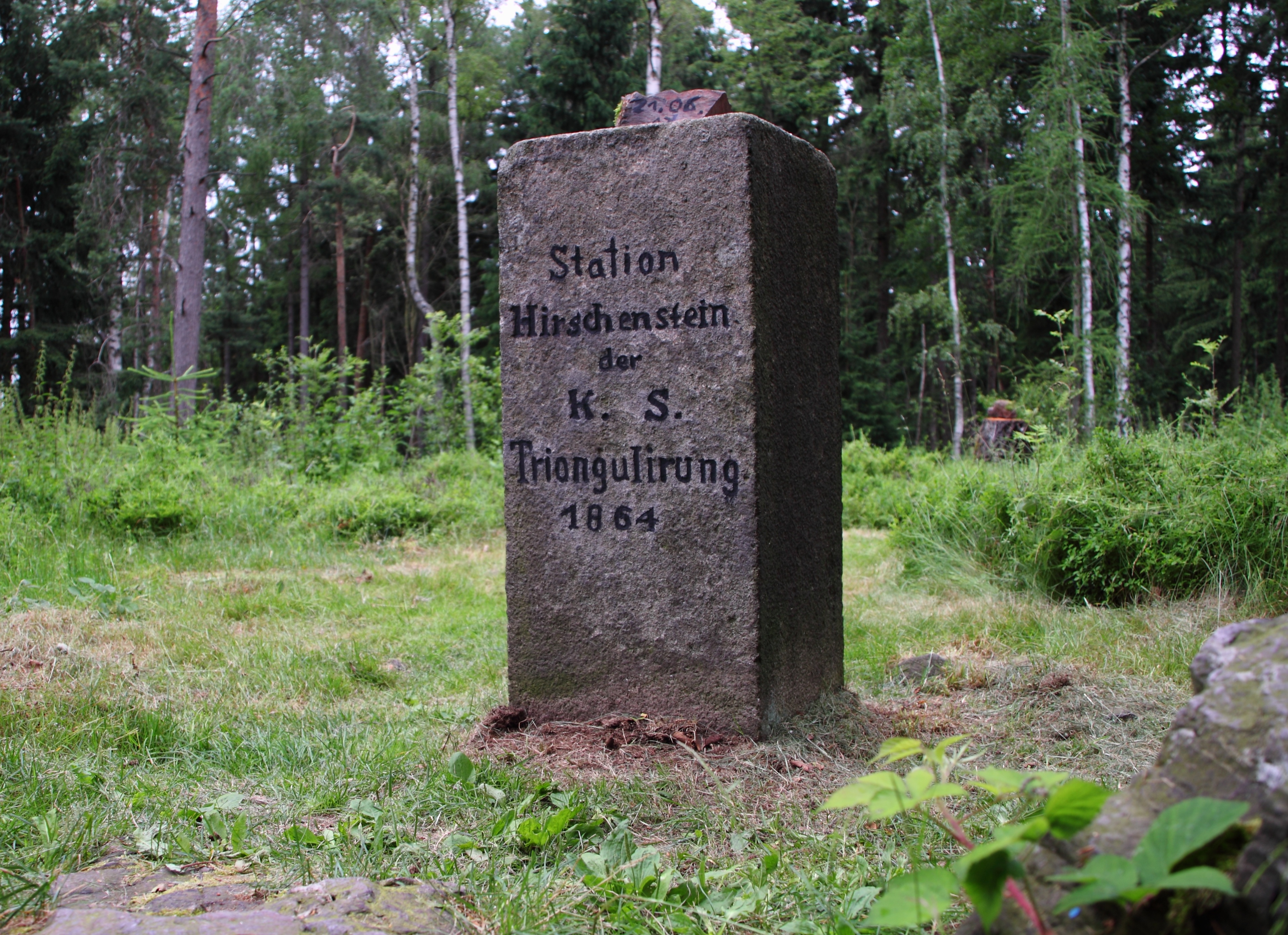

Highest point
- Elevation: 610.4 m (2,003 ft)
- Coordinates: 50°35′35″N 12°34′21″E

Geography
- Location within Saxony
- Location: Saxony, Germany
- Parent range: Ore Mountains

The Hirschenstein is a mountain in the Ore Mountains in Saxony, Germany. It lies about 4 kilometres west of Schneeberg. On the summit is an historic trig point set up as part of the Royal Saxon Triangulation Network.

== History ==
Even before it was settled by Franks the summit was known to the Sorbs who called it the Recma. In 1864 state surveyors erected a granite column at the top with the inscription "Hirschenstein Station of the Royal Saxon Survey" (Station Hirschenstein der königlich-sächsischen Triangulation).

In the years 1940/41 a 60-metre-high (200 ft) wooden tower was erected over the survey point, which was also used as an observation tower. However just 10 years later the stability of the tower could no longer be guaranteed and it was taken down.

In 1964 the Hartmannsdorf Forest (Hartmannsdorfer Wald) that surrounded the summit became a military out-of-bounds zone. No until the disbandment of the Schneeberg mountain infantry battalion in March 2008 did the 1,600 hectare area of woodland become accessible again.

The Hirschenstein is the highest point in the district of Zwickau.
