= Käbschütztal =

- Municipality
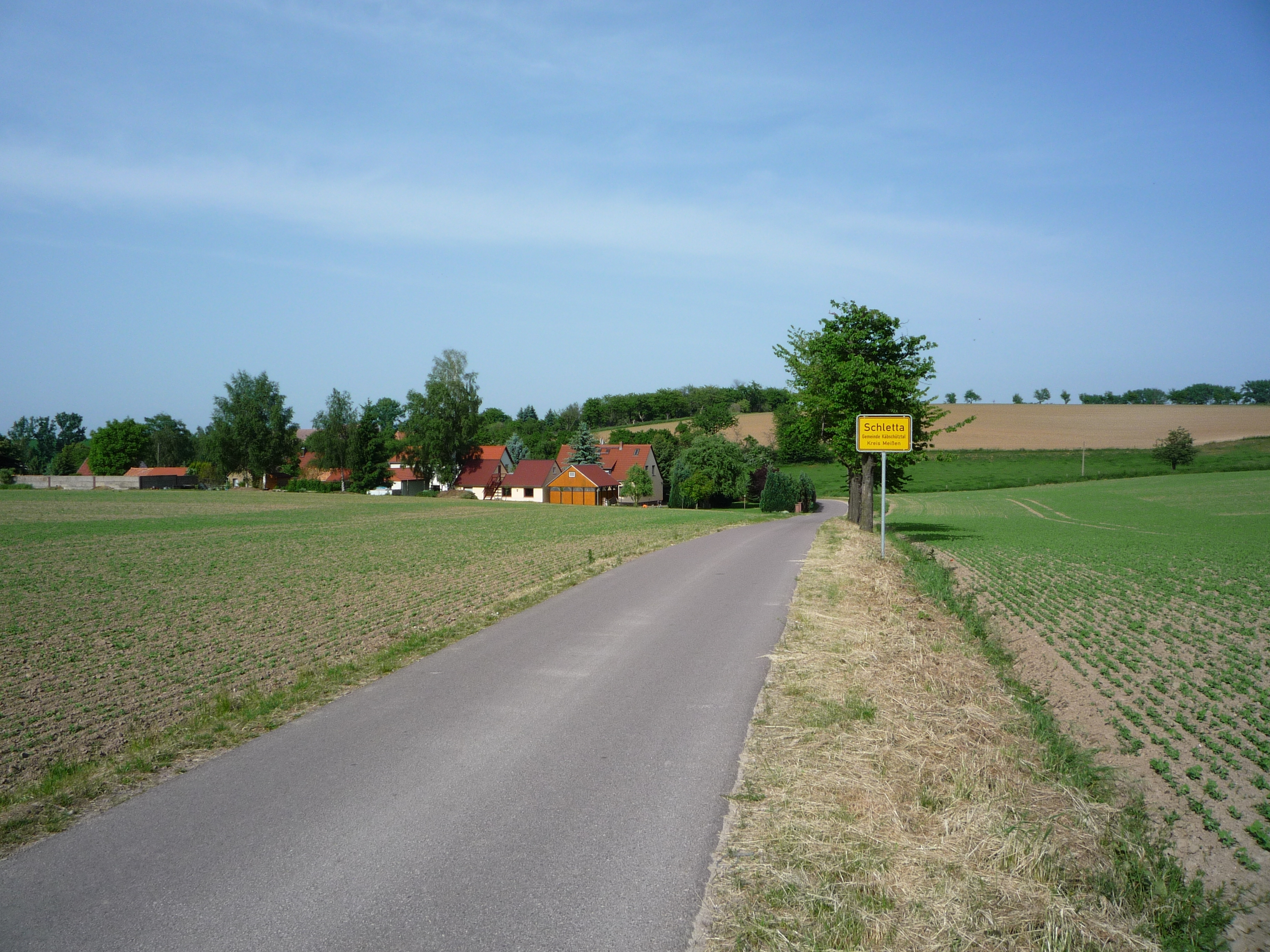
- Access road to Käbschütztal-Schletta

- Location of Käbschütztal within Meißen district
- Interactive map of Käbschütztal
- Location within Germany Location within Saxony
- Coordinates: 51°9′N 13°23′E
- Country: Germany
- State: Saxony
- District: Meißen
- Subdivisions: 37

Government
  - Mayor (2022–29): Frank Müller

Area
  - Total: 50.45 km^{2} (19.48 sq mi)
- Elevation: 209 m (686 ft)

Population (2025-12-31)
  - Total: 2,725
  - Density: 54.01/km^{2} (139.9/sq mi)
- Time zone: UTC+01:00 (CET)
  - Summer (DST): UTC+02:00 (CEST)
- Postal codes: 01665
- Dialling codes: 035244
- Vehicle registration: MEI, GRH, RG, RIE
- Website: www.gemeinde-kaebschuetztal.de

Käbschütztal is a municipality in the district of Meißen, in Saxony, Germany.
