= Wülknitz =

- Municipality
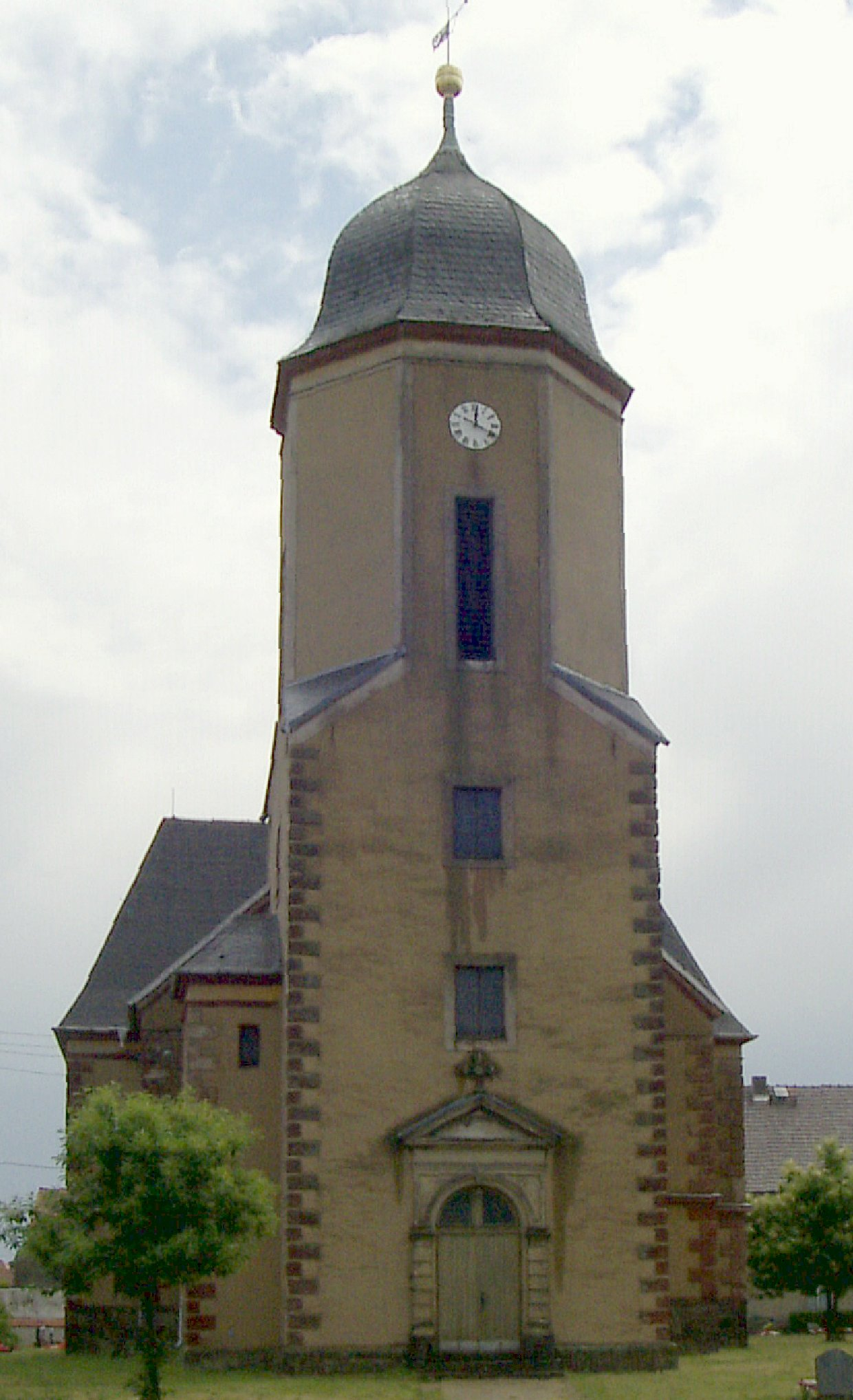
- Lichtensee church

- Coat of arms

- Location of Wülknitz within Meißen district
- Interactive map of Wülknitz
- Location within Germany Location within Saxony
- Coordinates: 51°22′N 13°24′E
- Country: Germany
- State: Saxony
- District: Meißen
- Subdivisions: 6

Government
  - Mayor (2022–29): Rico Weser

Area
  - Total: 27.77 km^{2} (10.72 sq mi)
- Elevation: 95 m (312 ft)

Population (2025-12-31)
  - Total: 1,550
  - Density: 55.8/km^{2} (145/sq mi)
- Time zone: UTC+01:00 (CET)
  - Summer (DST): UTC+02:00 (CEST)
- Postal codes: 01609
- Dialling codes: 035263
- Vehicle registration: MEI, GRH, RG, RIE
- Website: www.gemeinde-wuelknitz.de

Wülknitz is a municipality in the district of Meißen, in Saxony, Germany.

== History ==
Wülknitz was the first time in 1262, Lichtensee in 1032, Tiefenau in 1013 and Peritz mentioned in records in 1266.

In 1730 August the Strong held a grand military exercise near Zeithain. At this occasion an opera house was built in Streumen.

On 1 January 1994 joined the current districts Heidehäuser, Lichtensee, Peritz, Streumen, Tiefenau (since November 1, 1952 by incorporation of a district Lichtensee) and Wülknitz to present Wülknitz community together.
