= Weinböhla =

- Municipality
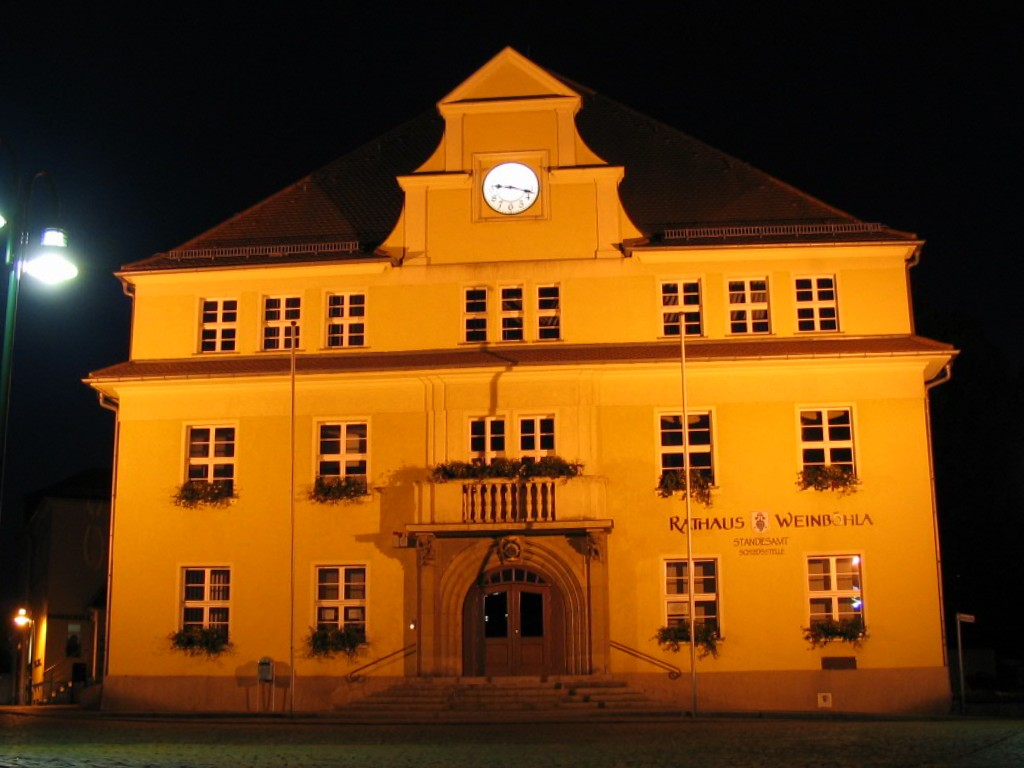
- Guildhall of Weinböhla

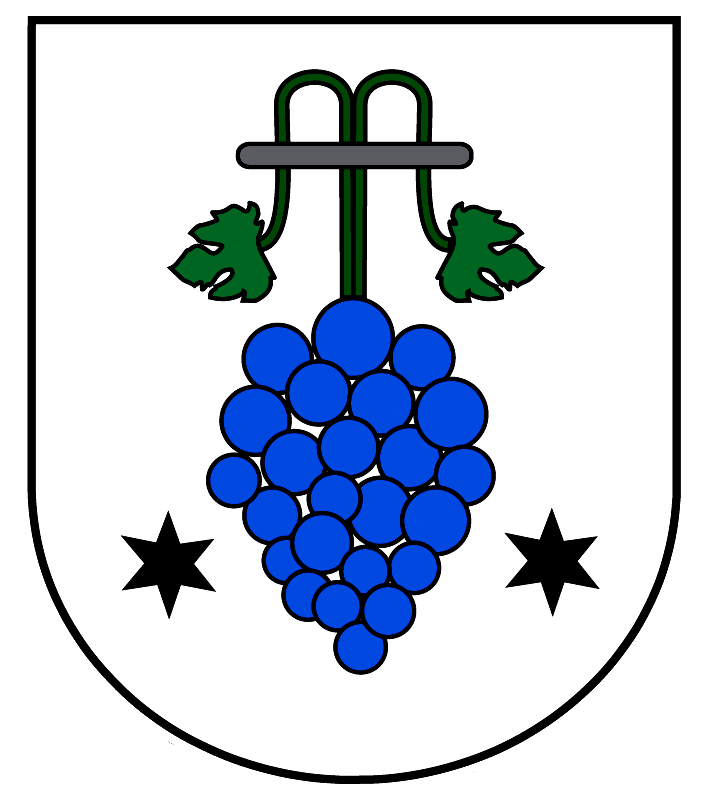
- Coat of arms

- Location of Weinböhla within Meißen district
- Interactive map of Weinböhla
- Location within Germany Location within Saxony
- Coordinates: 51°10′N 13°34′E
- Country: Germany
- State: Saxony
- District: Meißen
- Subdivisions: 2

Government
  - Mayor (2022–29): Siegfried Zenker (CDU)

Area
  - Total: 19.01 km^{2} (7.34 sq mi)
- Elevation: 148 m (486 ft)

Population (2025-12-31)
  - Total: 10,660
  - Density: 560.8/km^{2} (1,452/sq mi)
- Time zone: UTC+01:00 (CET)
  - Summer (DST): UTC+02:00 (CEST)
- Postal codes: 01686–01689
- Dialling codes: 035243
- Vehicle registration: MEI, GRH, RG, RIE
- Website: www.weinboehla.de

Weinböhla is a municipality in the district of Meißen, in Saxony, Germany. It is situated 7 km east of Meißen, and 17 km northwest of Dresden.

The municipality can be reached from Dresden by Dresdner Verkehrsbetriebe tram route 4.
