= Hirschstein =

- Municipality
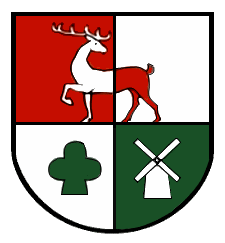
- Coat of arms

- Location of Hirschstein within Meißen district
- Interactive map of Hirschstein
- Location within Germany Location within Saxony
- Coordinates: 51°15′45″N 13°23′38″E
- Country: Germany
- State: Saxony
- District: Meißen

Government
  - Mayor (2022–29): Conrad Seifert (CDU)

Area
  - Total: 34.46 km^{2} (13.31 sq mi)
- Elevation: 129 m (423 ft)

Population (2025-12-31)
  - Total: 1,924
  - Density: 55.83/km^{2} (144.6/sq mi)
- Time zone: UTC+01:00 (CET)
  - Summer (DST): UTC+02:00 (CEST)
- Postal codes: 01594
- Dialling codes: 035266
- Vehicle registration: MEI, GRH, RG, RIE
- Website: www.hirschstein.de

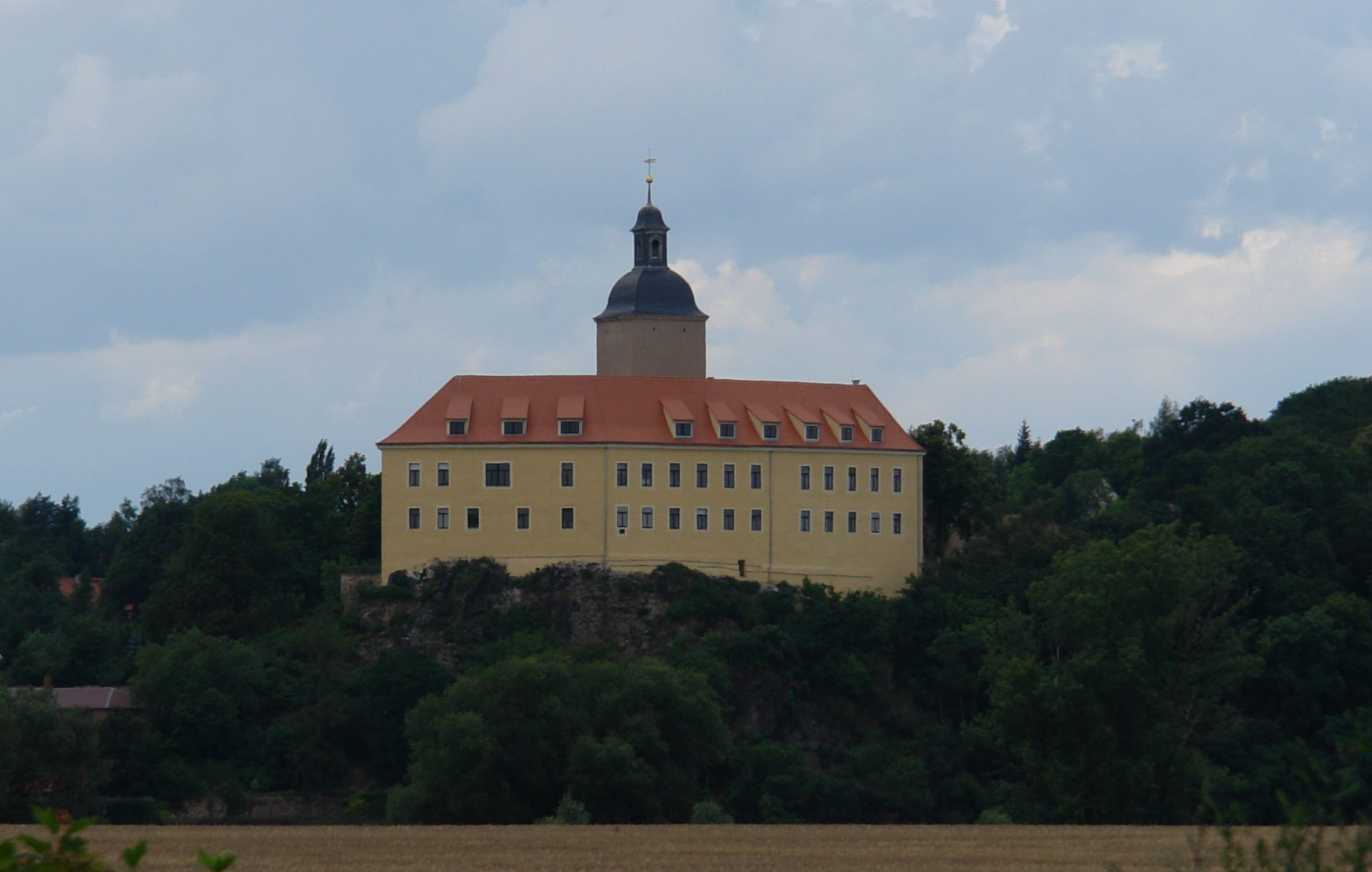
Castle Hirschstein

Hirschstein is a municipality in the district of Meißen, in Saxony, Germany.

The following villages belong to Hirschstein: Althirschstein, Bahra, Böhla, Boritz, Heyda, Kobeln, Mehltheuer, Neuhirschstein, Pahrenz, Prausitz and Schänitz.

Leopold III of Belgium and his family were held in Castle Hirschstein from June 1944 to March 1945 by the Nazis.
