= Glaubitz =

- Municipality
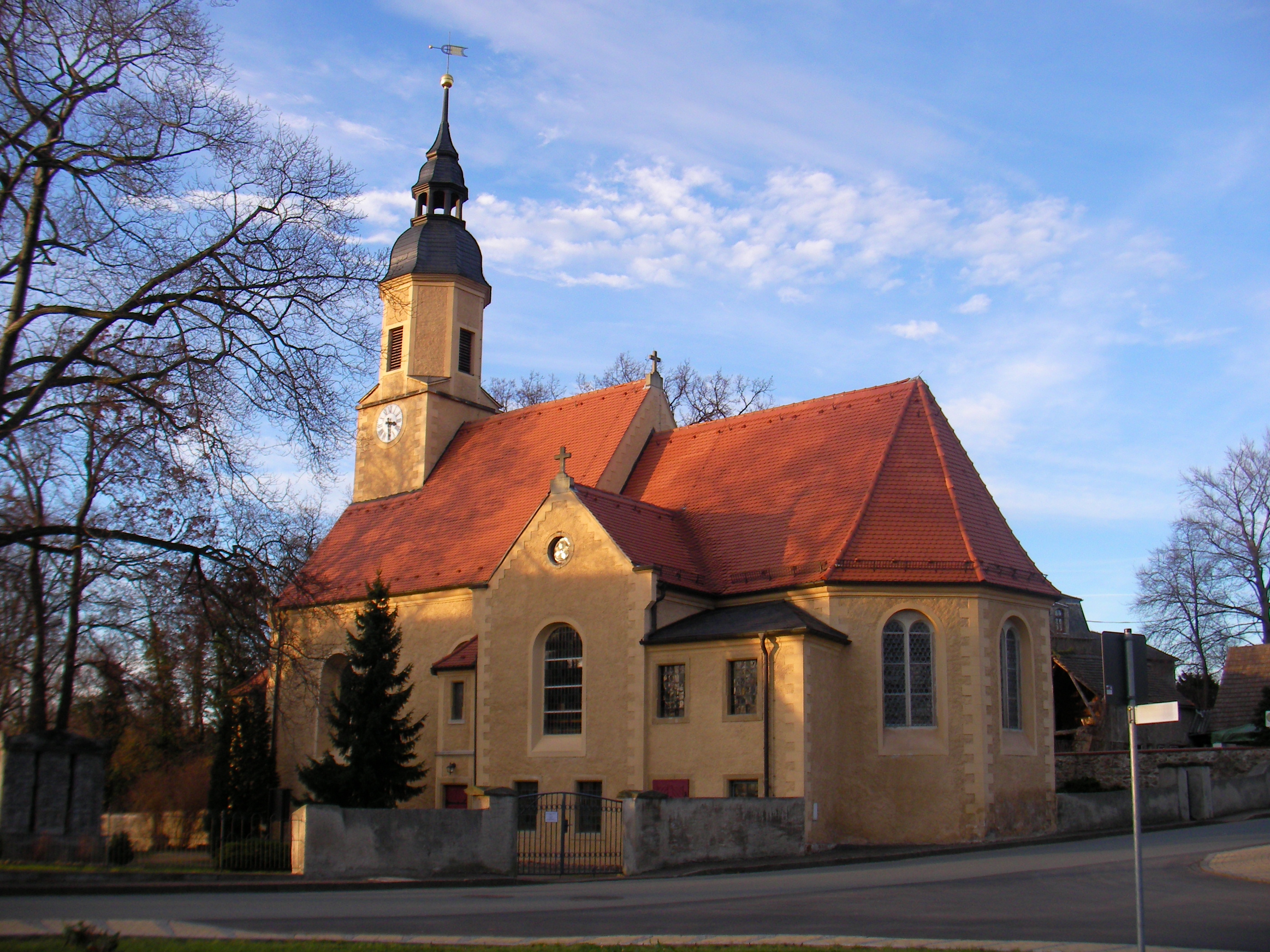
- Glaubitz church

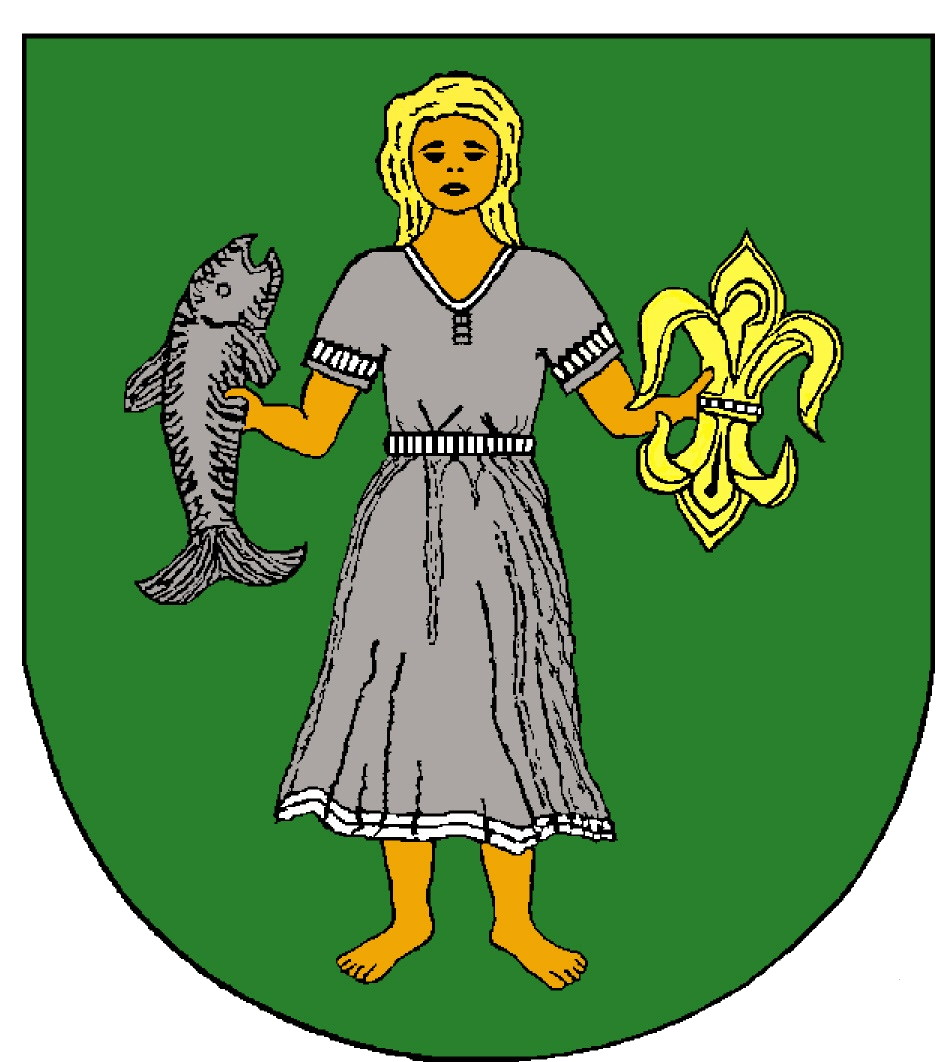
- Coat of arms

- Location of Glaubitz within Meißen district
- Interactive map of Glaubitz
- Location within Germany Location within Saxony
- Coordinates: 51°19′N 13°23′E
- Country: Germany
- State: Saxony
- District: Meißen
- Subdivisions: 3

Government
  - Mayor (2022–29): Lutz Thiemig

Area
  - Total: 13.97 km^{2} (5.39 sq mi)
- Elevation: 119 m (390 ft)

Population (2025-12-31)
  - Total: 1,942
  - Density: 139.0/km^{2} (360.0/sq mi)
- Time zone: UTC+01:00 (CET)
  - Summer (DST): UTC+02:00 (CEST)
- Postal codes: 01612
- Dialling codes: 035265
- Vehicle registration: MEI, GRH, RG, RIE

Glaubitz is a municipality in the district of Meißen, in Saxony, Germany. In the town there is a monument to the victims of the S.S.

== History ==
Glaubitz is derived from the Slavic words glubka and glubiza which mean small deep place. The place was in the settlement area of the Daleminzier.

The place Glaubitz was first mentioned in 1271, then under the Slavic name "Glubozk". In 1319 a church was first mentioned. In 1408 Poppe is located on Glaubitz of Köckeritz and Glaubitz was a castle besieged by the Margrave of Brandenburg. In 1585, the Bush Mill (Grützmühle), a water mill with two grinding passes arose. Four years later, the construction of the church took place. The rule was exercised by inheritance and upper courts.

In 1642, during the Thirty Years War, the Swedish main army moved through Lennart Torstensson Glaubitz towards a large grove. During the Seven Years' War on November 17, 1757, a cavalry engagement occurred between Glaubitz and a wild grove. In 1781 for the first time a school is mentioned. 1886 a new school was built, which had to be enlarged in 1905 due to increased student enrollment. In 1904 the volunteer fire brigade was founded. In 1934/35, the settlement was built on the road of youth, then the channel complex. The First and the Second World War had many victims in Glaubitz.

The Memorial Stone for the Victims of Fascism in the Glaubitz Forest.

On April 17, 1945, a column of concentration camp prisoners reached Glaubitz. During a break on the sports field, many prisoners escaped during an air raid. The recaptured in space Glaubitz of the Hitler Youth prisoners were shot and buried in Glaubitzer forest. A monument commemorates it today. On April 24, 1945, Hitler's army was defeated in this area.

On November 4, 1945, the committee for mutual aid, Bauer, was established and distributed 399 acres of land from expropriation of 73 new farmers under the land reform. 1953 the LPG 4 farmers was established, some of the LPG operating channel region was later.

In 1967, the residential blocks built "On Robbery castle". Today houses dot the village. After the turn of the streets "Stephan Poschingerstraße" and "Seebergblick" were built.

Time direction grove was a new industrial park, where many industries have settled.
