= Priestewitz =

- Municipality
- Location of Priestewitz within Meißen district
- Interactive map of Priestewitz
- Location within Germany Location within Saxony
- Coordinates: 51°15′13″N 13°30′33″E
- Country: Germany
- State: Saxony
- District: Meißen
- Subdivisions: 21

Government
  - Mayor (2017–24): Manuela Gajewi

Area
  - Total: 61.20 km^{2} (23.63 sq mi)
- Elevation: 145 m (476 ft)

Population (2025-12-31)
  - Total: 3,070
  - Density: 50.2/km^{2} (130/sq mi)
- Time zone: UTC+01:00 (CET)
  - Summer (DST): UTC+02:00 (CEST)
- Postal codes: 01561
- Dialling codes: 03522, 035249, 035267
- Vehicle registration: MEI, GRH, RG, RIE
- Website: https://www.priestewitz.de/

Priestewitz is a municipality in the district of Meißen, in Saxony, Germany.

== History ==
Priestewitz is first documented in 1350 as Pristanewicz. The name is probably from the altsorbischen Pristańovica, "dock", so to interpret PRISTAN "settlement with a jetty." It could also be the derivative of a personal name. Then the interpretation of the basic form of private / Prestanovici as a "settlement of the primary / Prestan" would understand. Other forms of the name were Pristanewicz 1350, 1378 and Prystinwicz Prystenewicz, 1406 Brostelwicz 1418 Brestenewicz, 1420 Prüstewicz, Pruschtewitz 1535, 1547/1551 and 1648 Brostewicz Pristewiz and Bristytz. From 1791, the name was used Priestewitz.

In 1378, Priestewitz belonged to the administrative castle district (castellany) of Großenhain. In 1511, mentioned as a manor. In the northern part of the corridor there is the deserted village of the town Kunnershain. Another deserted village is Breßnitz. Until the Reformation, the monastery had Seusslitz parts of the village. Then the Prokuraturamt Meissen, Meissen, the Office of Education and the Office Hayn Priestewitz shared interests in the village. 1547 includes seven hooves of the school and a further seven hoofs the Council of the Great City grove. Priestewitz had to provide three bushels of wheat and wax tributes annually to the district office Meissen, freight for official grain supplies to the Elbe, provide construction services and provide a Corporal for Helgeland. In 1821 a windmill is mentioned.

The construction of the first German long-distance railway line Leipzig–Dresden 1839 Priestewitz got its own railway station. Its geographical proximity to Meissen and Großenhain brought rapid economic development for the town, which gained some importance as an important transportation hub. [3]

In the fall of 1843, the Royal Saxon Army led large maneuvers in the area around Priestewitz through, while the occupation and conquest was of strategic importance to the railway station.

== Municipality subdivisions ==
Priestewitz includes the following subdivisions:

- Altleis
- Baselitz
- Baßlitz
- Blattersleben
- Böhla
- Döschütz
- Gävernitz
- Geißlitz
- Kmehlen
- Kottewitz
- Laubach
- Lenz
- Medessen
- Nauleis
- Piskowitz
- Porschütz
- Stauda
- Strießen
- Wantewitz
- Zottewitz
