= Röderaue =

- Municipality
- Coat of arms

- Location of Röderaue within Meißen district
- Interactive map of Röderaue
- Location within Germany Location within Saxony
- Coordinates: 51°23′15″N 13°27′30″E
- Country: Germany
- State: Saxony
- District: Meißen
- Subdivisions: 5

Government
  - Mayor (2022–29): Bernd Schuster

Area
  - Total: 28.94 km^{2} (11.17 sq mi)
- Elevation: 104 m (341 ft)

Population (2025-12-31)
  - Total: 2,377
  - Density: 82.14/km^{2} (212.7/sq mi)
- Time zone: UTC+01:00 (CET)
  - Summer (DST): UTC+02:00 (CEST)
- Postal codes: 01609
- Dialling codes: 035263
- Vehicle registration: MEI, GRH, RG, RIE
- Website: www.roederaue.de

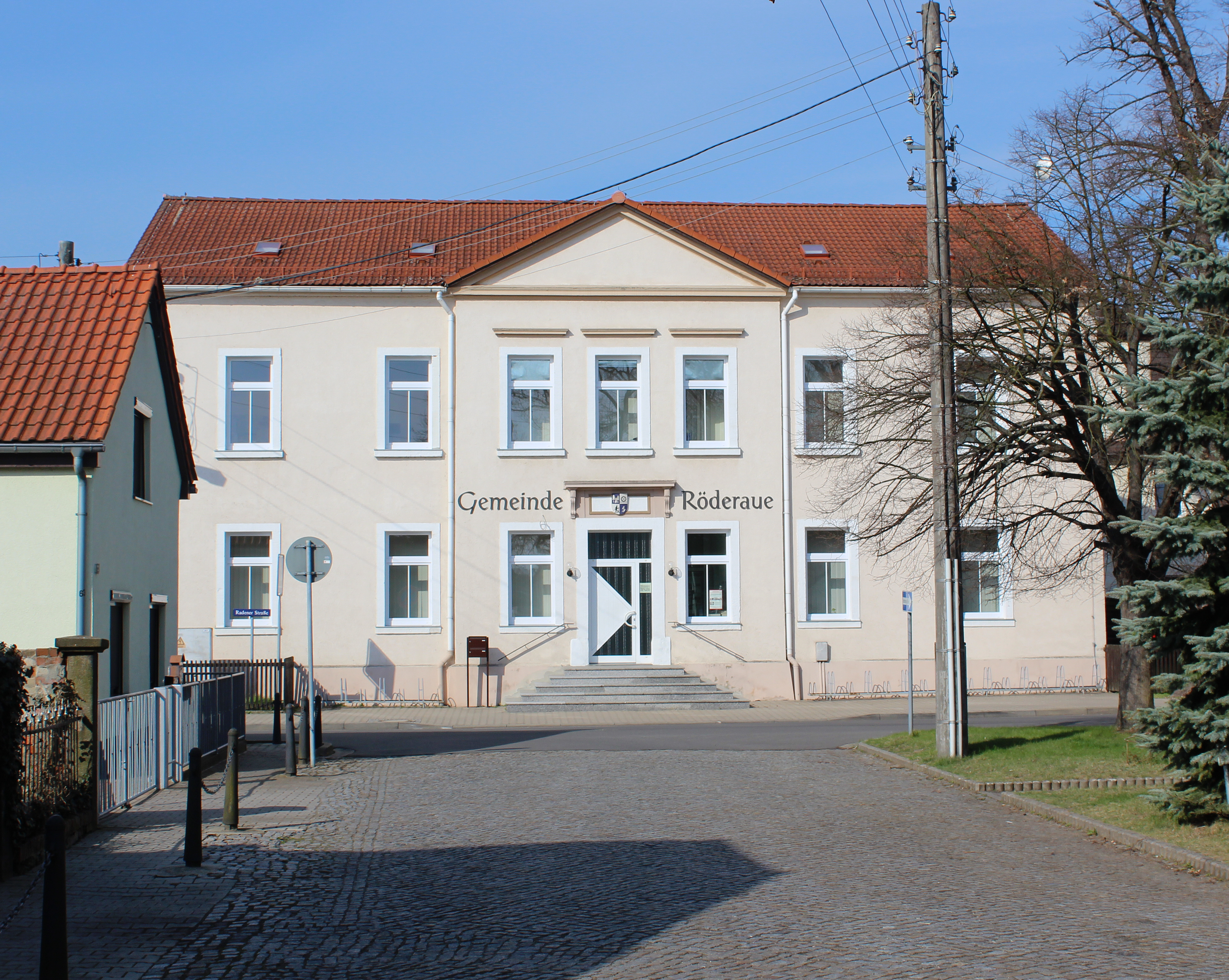
Frauenhain (Röderaue) Gemeindeam

Röderaue is a municipality in the district of Meißen (Meissen), in Saxony, Germany.

Röderaue includes the following subdivisions:

- Frauenhain
- Koselitz
- Pulsen
- Raden
