= Lampertswalde =

- Municipality
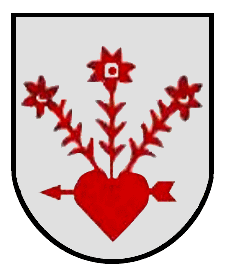
- Coat of arms

- Location of Lampertswalde within Meißen district
- Interactive map of Lampertswalde
- Location within Germany Location within Saxony
- Coordinates: 51°19′N 13°40′E
- Country: Germany
- State: Saxony
- District: Meißen

Government
  - Mayor (2019–26): René Venus

Area
  - Total: 63.52 km^{2} (24.53 sq mi)
- Elevation: 152 m (499 ft)

Population (2025-12-31)
  - Total: 2,476
  - Density: 38.98/km^{2} (101.0/sq mi)
- Time zone: UTC+01:00 (CET)
  - Summer (DST): UTC+02:00 (CEST)
- Postal codes: 01561
- Dialling codes: 035248
- Vehicle registration: MEI, GRH, RG, RIE
- Website: www.gemeinde-lampertswalde.de

Lampertswalde is a municipality in the district of Meißen, in Saxony, Germany.

== Municipality subdivisions ==
Lampertswalde includes the following subdivisions:

- Adelsdorf (formerly Dorf der Jugend)
- Blochwitz
- Brockwitz
- Brößnitz
- Mühlbach
- Oelsnitz
- Niegeroda
- Quersa
- Schönborn
- Weißig am Raschütz
