= Meissen (district) =

Coordinates: 51°13′N 13°31′E

Meissen (Meißen)
- District
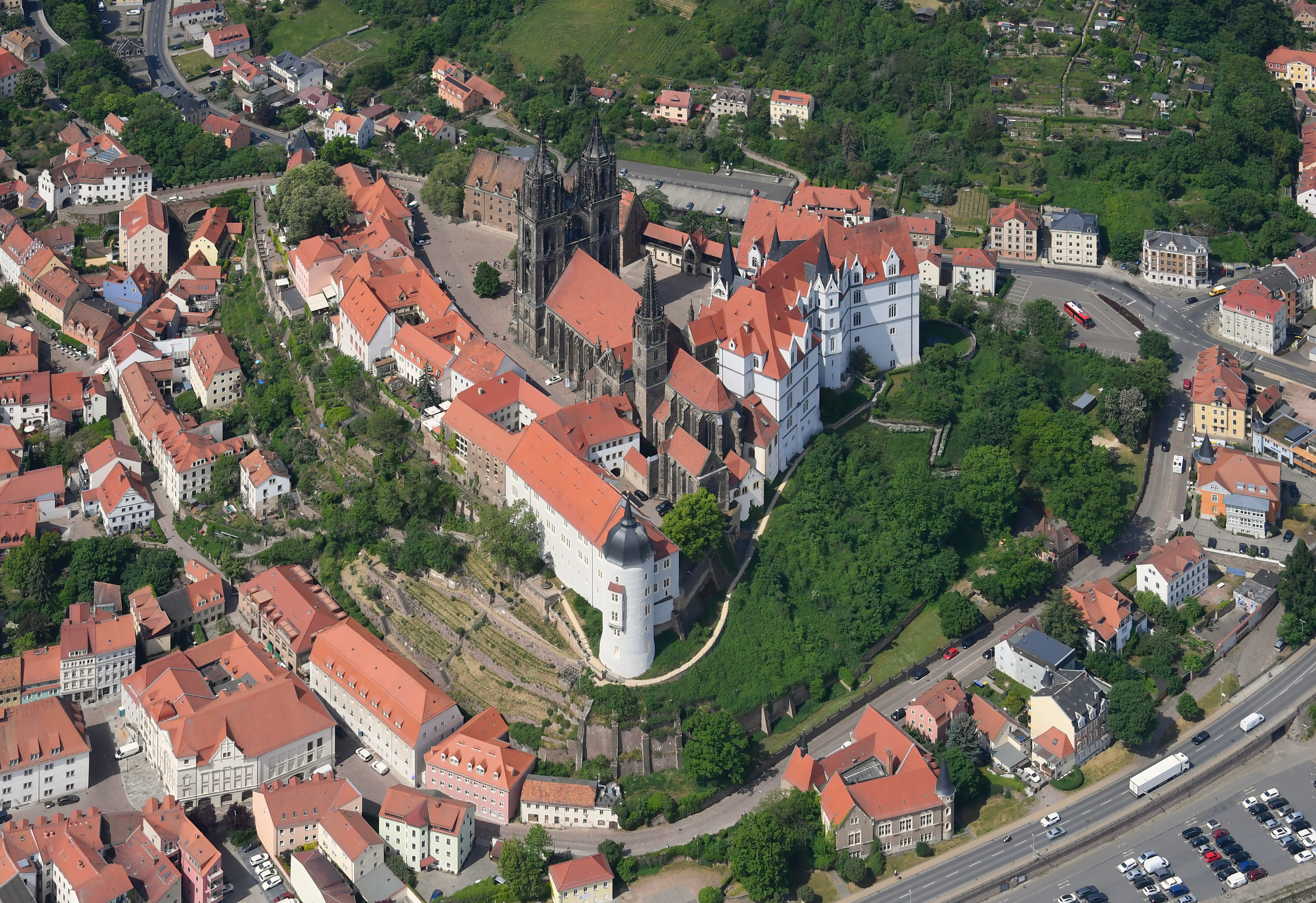
- Ariel view of Meißen, the seat and most populous town in the district.

- Flag Coat of arms
- Country: Germany
- State: Saxony
- Capital: Meissen

Government
  - District admin.: Ralf Hänsel (CDU)

Area
  - Total: 1,453 km^{2} (561 sq mi)

Population (31 December 2024)
  - Total: 239,221
  - Density: 164.6/km^{2} (426.4/sq mi)
- Time zone: UTC+01:00 (CET)
  - Summer (DST): UTC+02:00 (CEST)
- Vehicle registration: MEI, GRH, RG, RIE
- Website: www.kreis-meissen.org

Meissen (German: Meißen) is a district (Kreis) in Saxony, Germany. It is bounded by (from the north and clockwise) the state of Brandenburg, the district of Bautzen, the urban district Dresden, the districts Sächsische Schweiz-Osterzgebirge, Mittelsachsen and Nordsachsen.

== History ==
The district dates back to the Amt Meißen, which was first mentioned in 1334. The district was ruled by the Wettin dynasty. The Margraves of what then became the Margravate of Meissen created the administrative division (Amt) in the 13th century. In 1835 the Amt was converted into an Amtshauptmannschaft, with the area of the current district covered by the Amtshauptmannschaften Meissen, Dresden and Großenhain. In 1939, these were renamed Landkreise (districts). In the administrative reform of 1952, several municipalities were transferred to the districts of Freiberg and Döbeln. In 1990, the old district borders were restored, and in 1996 parts of the district Dresden-Land were added. In August 2008 the district of Riesa-Großenhain was added to the district to give it its current size.

== Geography ==
The main river of the district is the Elbe, which also flows through the town of Meissen.

== Towns and municipalities ==
Clickable map of municipalities in the district

Towns
Municipalities
1. Coswig
2. Gröditz
3. Großenhain
4. Lommatzsch
5. Meissen
6. Nossen
7. Radebeul
8. Radeburg
9. Riesa
10. Strehla
1. Diera-Zehren
2. Ebersbach
3. Glaubitz
4. Hirschstein
5. Käbschütztal
6. Klipphausen
7. Lampertswalde
8. Moritzburg
9. Niederau
10. Nünchritz
11. Priestewitz
12. Röderaue
13. Schönfeld
14. Stauchitz
15. Thiendorf
16. Weinböhla
17. Wülknitz
18. Zeithain

== Politics ==
Meißen (electoral district)

== Transportation ==
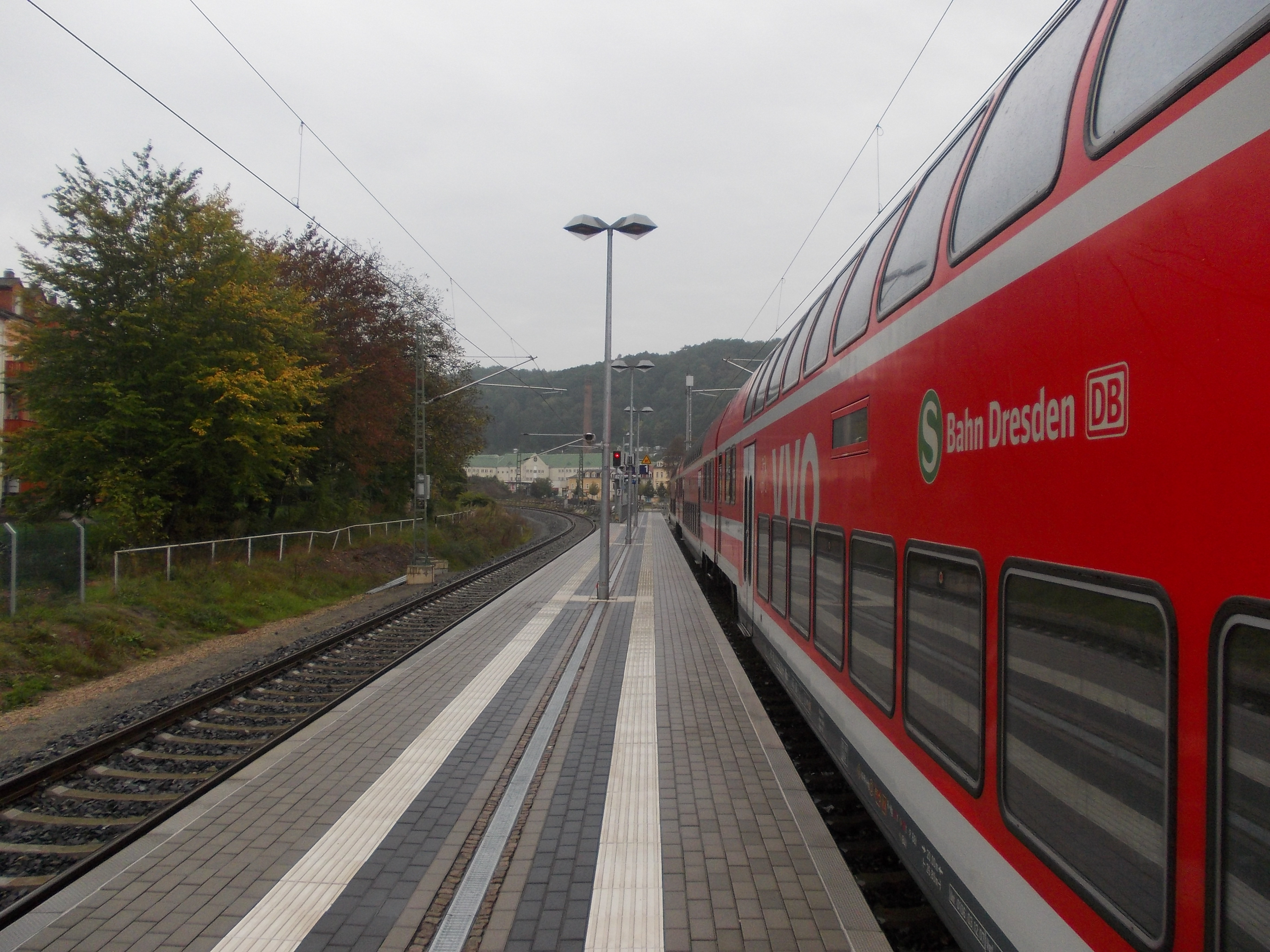
Meissen Triebischtal Station, the terminus of the S1 line of the Dresden S-Bahn

Meißen district is served by many regional and long distance train services as well as the Dresden S-Bahn. Major stations include Meißen Triebischtal, Riesa station and Coswig station.

The district is also served by many major highways including Bundesautobahn 13, Bundesautobahn 14 and Bundesautobahn 4.
