= Tauscha =

- Ortsteil of Thiendorf
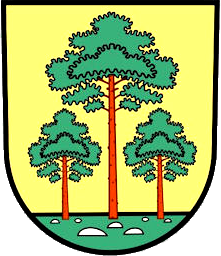
- Coat of arms
- Interactive map of Tauscha
- Location within Germany Location within Saxony
- Coordinates: 51°16′N 13°48′E
- Country: Germany
- State: Saxony
- District: Meißen
- Municipality: Thiendorf
- Subdivisions: 5

Area
  - Total: 23.88 km^{2} (9.22 sq mi)
- Elevation: 167 m (548 ft)

Population (2014-12-31)
  - Total: 1,454
  - Density: 60.89/km^{2} (157.7/sq mi)
- Time zone: UTC+01:00 (CET)
  - Summer (DST): UTC+02:00 (CEST)
- Postal codes: 01561
- Dialling codes: 035240
- Vehicle registration: MEI, GRH, RG, RIE
- Website: www.tauscha-online.de

Tauscha (German pronunciation: [ˈtaʊʃa]) is a former municipality in the district of Meißen, in Saxony, Germany. Since 1 January 2016 it is part of the municipality Thiendorf.

== Municipality subdivisions ==
Tauscha includes the following subdivisions:

- Dobra
- Kleinnaundorf
- Würschnitz
- Zschorna
