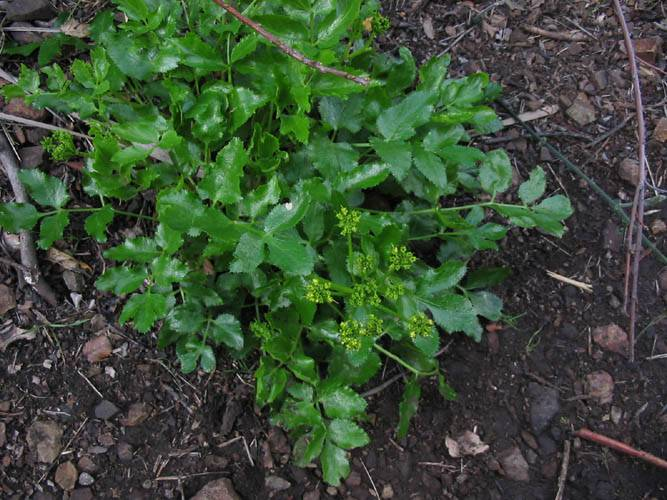
- Tauschia arguta

Scientific classification
- Kingdom: Plantae
- Clade: Tracheophytes
- Clade: Angiosperms
- Clade: Eudicots
- Clade: Asterids
- Order: Apiales
- Family: Apiaceae
- Subfamily: Apioideae
- Tribe: Selineae
- Genus: Tauschia; Schlecht.

Species
- About 35, see text.

= Tauschia =

Genus of plants

Tauschia is a genus of flowering plants in the carrot family which are known as umbrellaworts. These are perennial plants with taproots or tubers and foliage generally resembling that of relatives parsley and carrot. Tauschia are native to the Americas.

Selected species:

- Tauschia arguta – southern umbrellawort
- Tauschia glauca – glaucus umbrellawort
- Tauschia hartwegii – Hartweg's umbrellawort
- Tauschia howellii – Howell's umbrellawort
- Tauschia kelloggii – Kellogg's umbrellawort
- Tauschia parishii – Parish's umbrellawort
- Tauschia stricklandii – Strickland's umbrellawort
- Tauschia tenuissima – Leiberg's umbrellawort
- Tauschia texana – Texas umbrellawort
