= The cathedral in Halle =

Painting by Lyonel Feininger in the Moritzburg Art Museum

The cathedral in Halle (German: Der Dom in Halle)
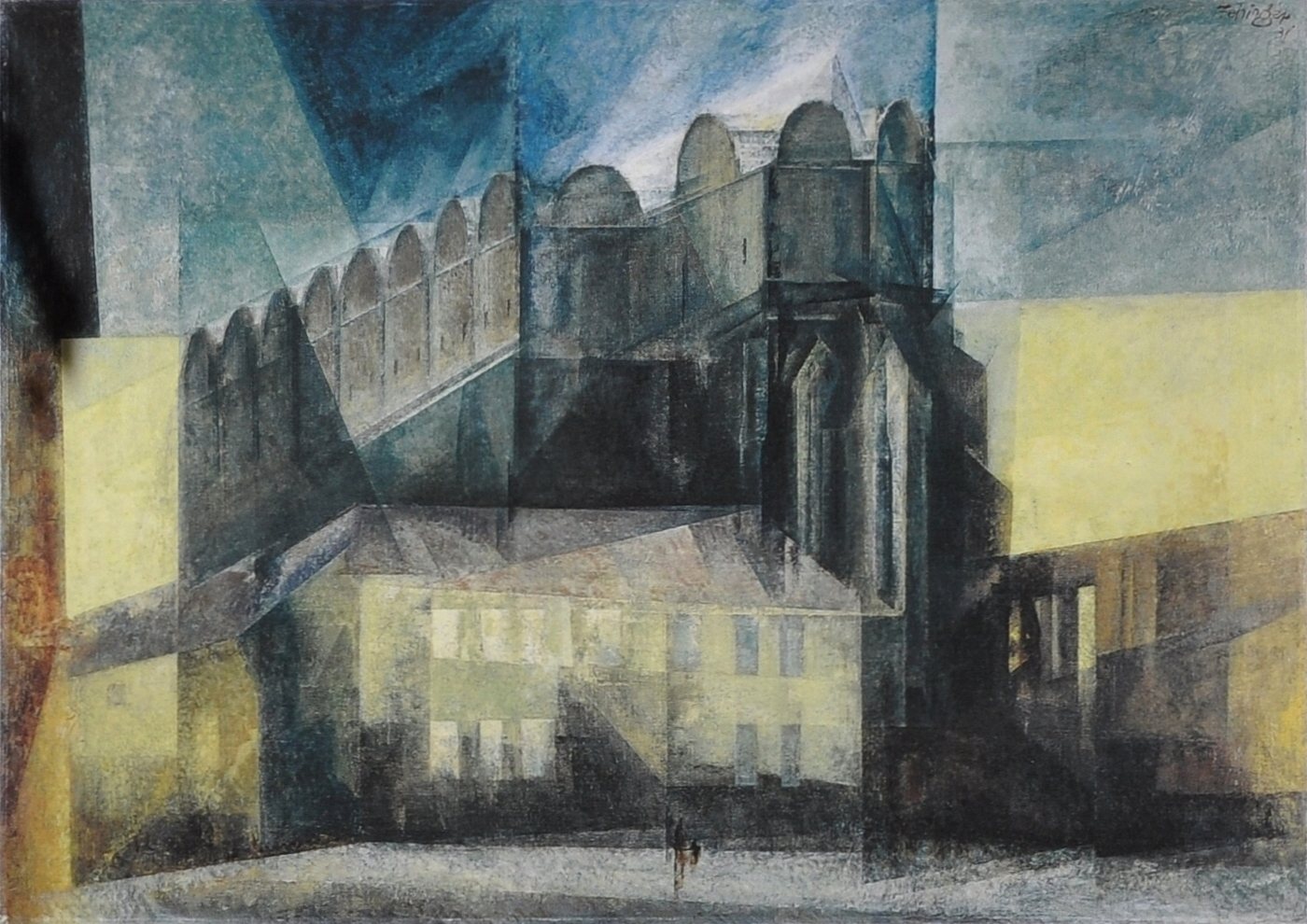
- Artist: Lyonel Feininger
- Year: 1931
- Type: Oil on canvas
- Dimensions: 86.5 cm × 124.5 cm (34.1 in × 49.0 in)
- Location: Kunstmuseum Moritzburg, Halle (Saale), Germany

The cathedral in Halle (German: Der Dom in Halle) is an oil painting by Lyonel Feininger from 1931. It is now in the Kunstmuseum Moritzburg in Halle (Saale) as part of the collection presentation Wege der Moderne (English: Paths of Modernism). It depicts the Halle Cathedral with the sexton's house in the foreground.

== Beginnings ==
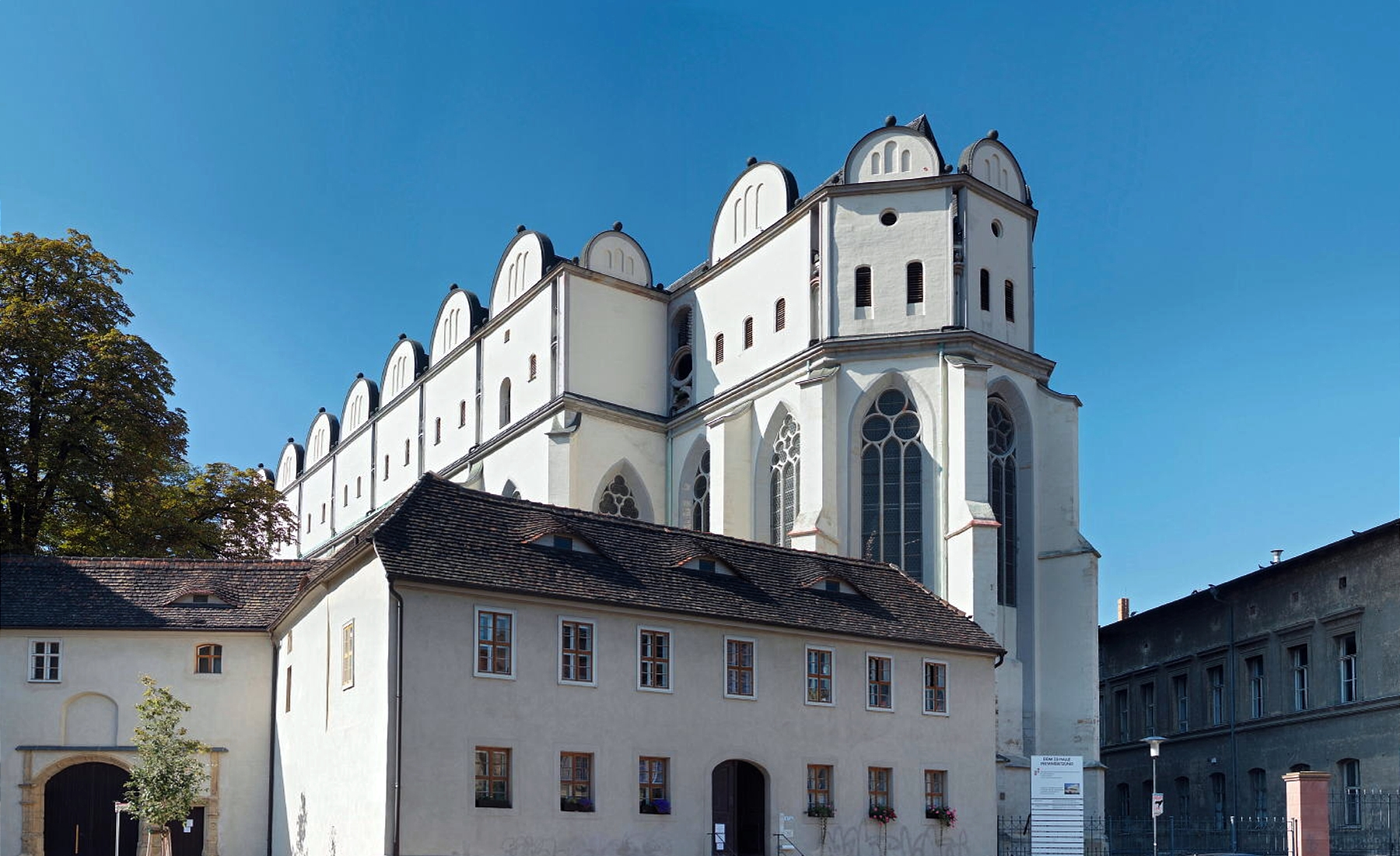
The Halle Cathedral with sexton's house

In 1928, Alois Schardt, then director of the Moritzburg Art Museum (German: Kunstmuseum Moritzburg), organized a Feininger exhibition in the chapel of the New Residence in Halle and acquired two paintings by the painter. In 1929, Schardt was commissioned by Halle's Mayor Richard Robert Rive to win over the artist to paint a view of the city, which was intended as a gift for the Oberpräsidium in Magdeburg. Feininger was provided with a studio on the top floor of the gate tower of the Moritzburg for this purpose. In the months that followed, he explored the city and made numerous photographs and sketches, which became the basis for a total of eleven paintings of the city, which Feininger made between 1929 and 1931. Three of the eleven paintings are now on display in the collection presentation Paths of Modernism at the Kunstmuseum Moritzburg Halle.

== Origin ==
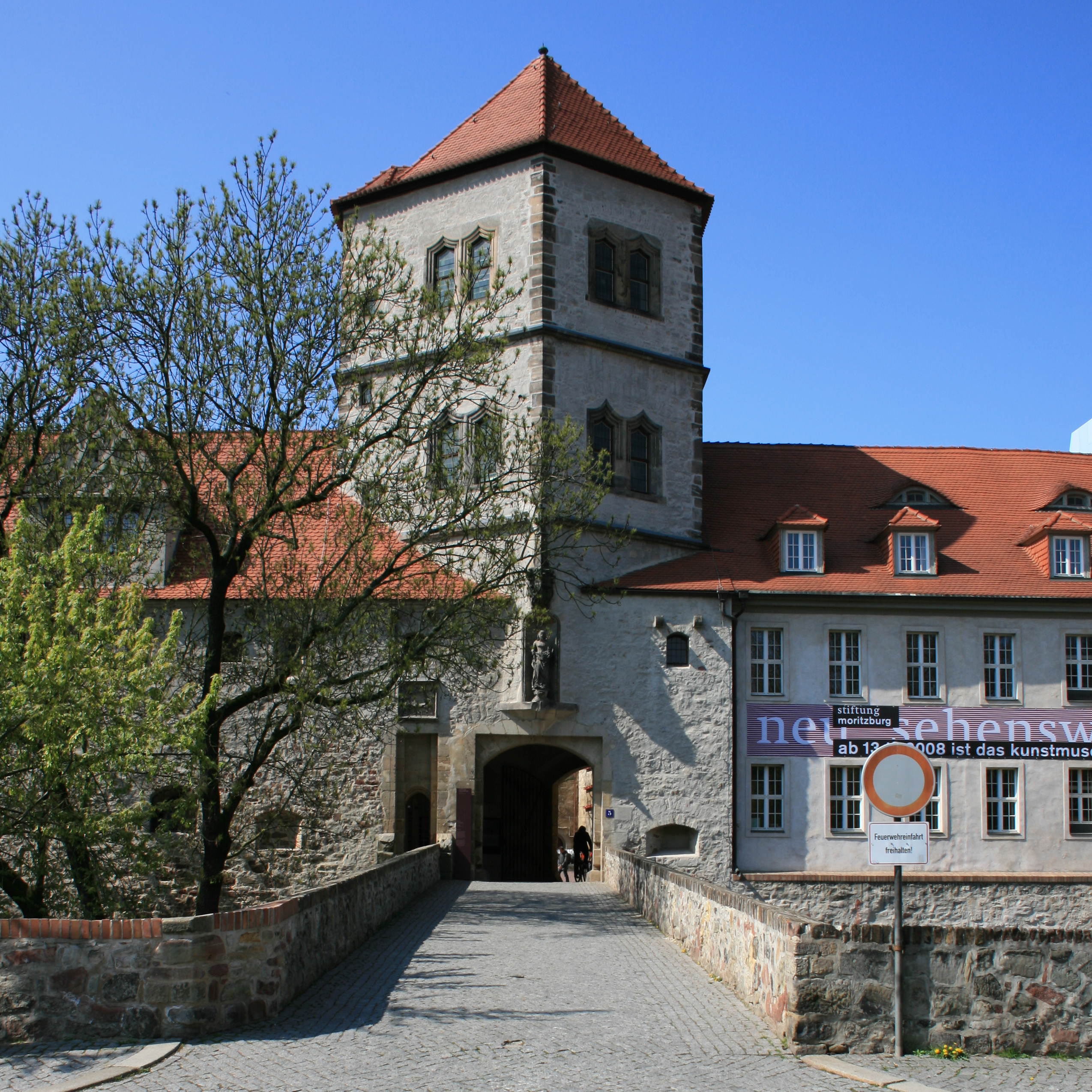
Gate tower of Moritzburg Castle

Feininger began his work on the image of Halle Cathedral in October 1929. From his studio in the gate tower of the Moritzburg, he could view it from the north and was always impressed by its idiosyncratic shape.

The completion of the painting took over two years. Feininger repeatedly scraped layers of paint off the canvas and revised his design. In April 1931, he finally removed so much paint with turpentine that only the contours of his previous work could be seen. This pale and reduced image became the basis of the final work.

== The painting ==
Feininger depicts the cathedral as a huge dark shadow that seems to move forward from the background of the picture. He emphasizes the strict regularity of the church architecture with its high choir windows. The cathedral presents itself as a massive, closed structure that at the same time strives towards the sky. The sexton's house in the foreground of the picture, with its brightly lit windows, contrasts with the dark, massive cathedral and takes away some of its heaviness.

The painting is crisscrossed by vertical, horizontal and diagonal lines that run across the entire surface of the picture and seem to form geometric shapes as a whole. The colour scheme includes heavy earth tones as well as blue and yellow tones. This light-shadow rhythm gives the picture a dramatic dynamic. The cathedral looks like a large ship moving from the sea towards the coast.

In Feininger's architectural paintings, people play only a subordinate role. Here, individual people in the middle of the foreground of the picture can only be seen dimly. Its small size seems to indicate the insignificance of human life and stands in contrast to the apparent immortality of architecture.

== Background ==
In 1931, Halle's Mayor Richard Robert Rive acquired the eleven views of Halle made by Feininger, together with 29 charcoal drawings, for the then municipal art museum in the Moritzburg. In 1932, they were integrated into the museum's collection presentation.

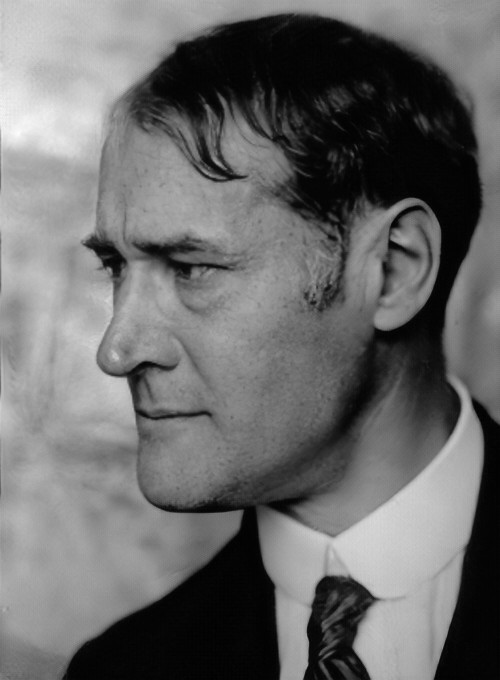
Hugo Erfurth: Lyonel Feininger (1941)

Feininger wanted to settle in Halle with his family, but the seizure of control by the Nazi Party prevented this. From then on, his paintings were considered "degenerate art". 400 of his works were removed from German museums, including all works from the Halle Art Museum. In 1937, two of the Halle paintings were defamatorily shown in the Munich exhibition "Degenerate Art". In the same year, Feininger left Germany and returned to his hometown of New York.

After the Second World War, "The Cathedral in Halle" and "The St. Mary's Church with the Arrow" were reacquired from private collections. The painting "The Red Tower I", which was thought to be lost, was purchased in 2009, so that today three of the former eleven paintings can be seen permanently at the place where they were created. The remaining paintings are distributed among various public collections in Germany, including Munich, Cologne, Hamburg, Mannheim and Berlin.
