= Halle Cathedral =

Church in Halle, Germany

Coordinates: 51°29′03″N 11°57′52″E

- Dom zu Halle
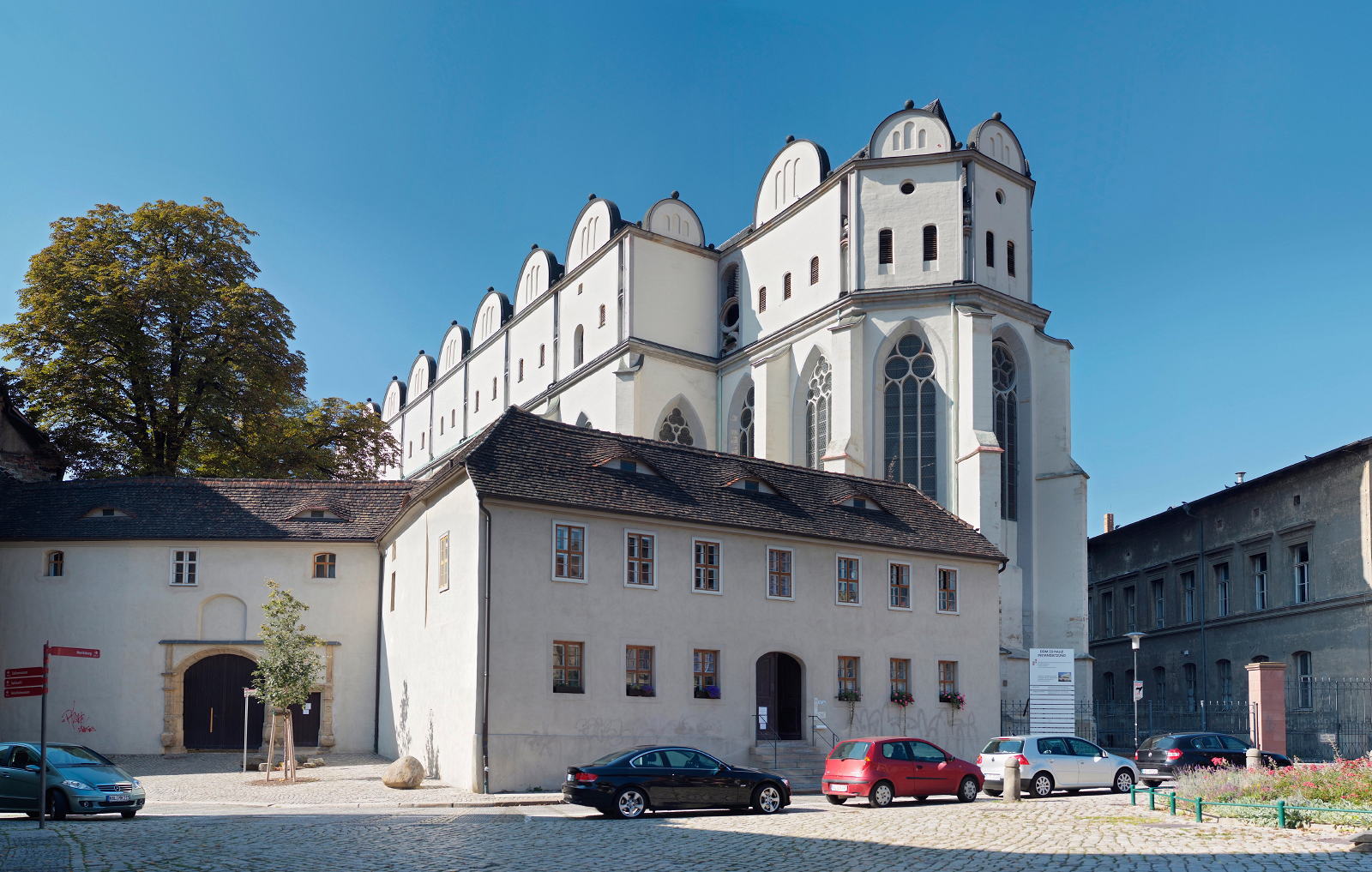
- Halle Cathedral
- Location: Halle
- Denomination: Evangelical
- Previous denomination: Roman Catholic

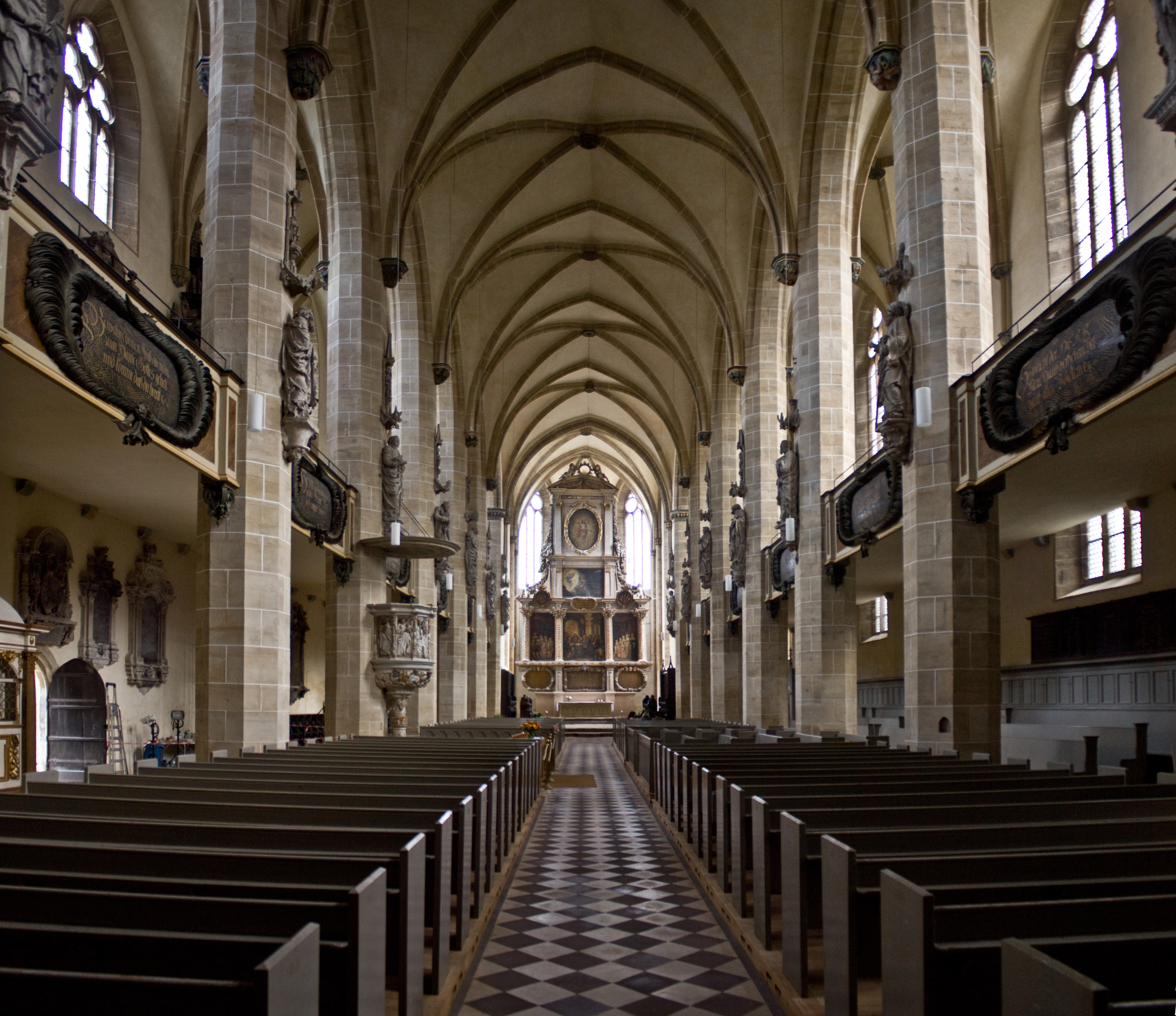
Interior

Halle Cathedral (German: Dom zu Halle) is an Evangelical Reformed Church, and is the oldest surviving church in the old part of the city Halle, Saale. Beside it resided the Archbishop of Magdeburg, who ruled the city for a long period. Albert of Brandenburg remodelled the church's exterior from 1520 onwards and built the neighbouring Neue Residenz, aiming to make the church one of the most influential and powerful monasteries north of the Alps.

== History ==
It was founded as a Dominican monastery in 1271 and completed in 1330, with a simple three-aisle abbey church dedicated to Sankt Paul zum heiligen Kreuz (the order's rules prohibited a tower or a separate choir).

Around 1520 the then-archbishop Albert of Brandenburg had Bastian Binder remodel the church's exterior, adding rounded gables. It was reconsecrated in 1523 as the Stiftskirche of the Archdiocese. It was probably first referred to as a 'Dom' or cathedral at that time, although it was never the seat of the archbishopric. From 1523 onwards Albert also took on artists to improve the interior, commissioning The Meeting of St Erasmus and St Maurice from Matthias Grünewald, altarpieces from Lucas Cranach the Elder and stone sculptures by Peter Schro. Between 1519 and 1525 Cranach and his workshop produced 16 altarpieces for the church with a total of 140 panels, though only two central panels, some wings and a few sketches survive. These alterations led to a church whose overall appearance was late Gothic and early Renaissance, an outstanding work of the Saxon Renaissance.

As an opponent of Martin Luther, Albert was forced out of Halle in 1541 and took the church's portable fittings with him to Aschaffenburg, where they remain. His secular successors as rulers of the area used the church as a chapel for their court and palace. The last such ruler, Augustus, Duke of Saxe-Weissenfels, added galleries and a larger altar in the mid 17th century, altering the church's style to early Baroque. In 1680 Frederick William, Elector of Brandenburg made it a parish church (by then the area was Protestant-Reformed) and in 1702 a young Georg Friedrich Händel was employed there for a year's probationary period.

The first abbess of the 'Freiweltliches adeliges von Jena’sches Fräuleinstift' was appointed in the church in 1703, the order having been founded by Gottfried von Jena with royal Prussian approval the previous year. The abbesses were also buried in the church. The interior was 're-Gothicised' between 1883 and 1896 and the outer walls and interior were restored by the Denkmalpflege between 1957 and 1959. The Domstiftung Sachsen-Anhalt began a full renovation of the church in 1996, with work largely completed by 2005.

== Organs ==
=== Main organ ===
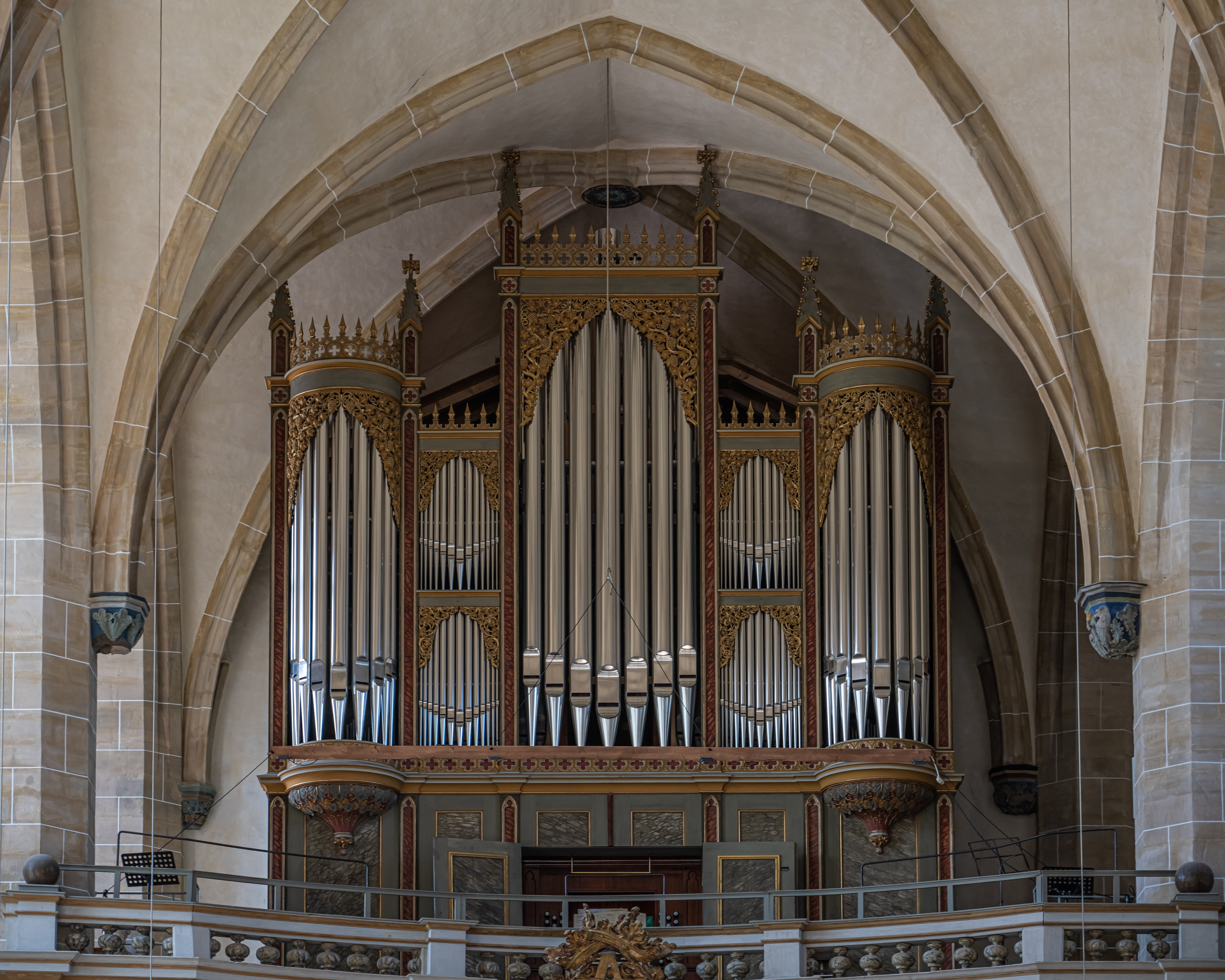
The Wäldner organ

In 1851 the parish replaced the church's baroque organ with a new instrument built by Friedrich Wilhelm Wäldner and August Ferdinand Wäldner, who had begun work on the instrument four years earlier. This instrument was used by a young George Frideric Handel shortly after beginning his education at University of Halle.

== See also ==
- The cathedral in Halle, painting by Lyonel Feininger, 1931

== Bibliography (in German) ==
- Heinrich L. Nickel: Der Dom zu Halle. Schnell und Steiner, München u. Zürich 1991. Ohne ISBN.
- Holger Brülls / Thomas Dietsch: Architekturführer Halle an der Saale. Dietrich Reimer, Berlin 2000, ISBN 3496012021.
- Achim Todenhöfer: Steinernes Gotteslob. Die mittelalterlichen Kirchen der Stadt Halle. In: Geschichte der Stadt Halle, Bd. 1, Halle im Mittelalter und der Frühen Neuzeit. Mitteldeutscher Verlag, Halle 2006, ISBN 978-3-89812-512-3. S. 207–226.
- Peggy Grötschel / Matthias Behne: Die Kirchen der Stadt Halle. Mitteldeutscher Verlag, Halle 2006, ISBN 3898123529.
- Martin Filitz: Halle Dom. Schnell und Steiner, Regensburg 2006, ISBN 978-3-7954-5675-7.
- Ellen Horstup: Halle Dom. In: Christian Antz (editor): Sieben Dome. Architektur und Kunst mittelalterlicher Kathedralen. Verlag Janos Stekovics, Dößel 2009, ISBN 978-3-89923-231-8, Seite 188–213.
- Achim Todenhöfer: Kirchen der Bettelorden. Die Baukunst der Dominikaner und Franziskaner in Sachsen-Anhalt. Dietrich Reimer Verlag, Berlin 2010, ISBN 978-3-496-01396-9. S. 81–91.
- Matthias Hamann: Der Liber Ordinarius Hallensis 1532. (Staatsbibliothek Bamberg, Msc. Lit. 119). Liturgische Reformen am Neuen Stift in Halle an der Saale unter Albrecht Kardinal von Brandenburg (Jerusalemer Theologisches Forum 27). Aschendorff, Münster 2014. ISBN 978-3-402-11028-7.
