= Zabeltitz =

- Stadtteil of Großenhain
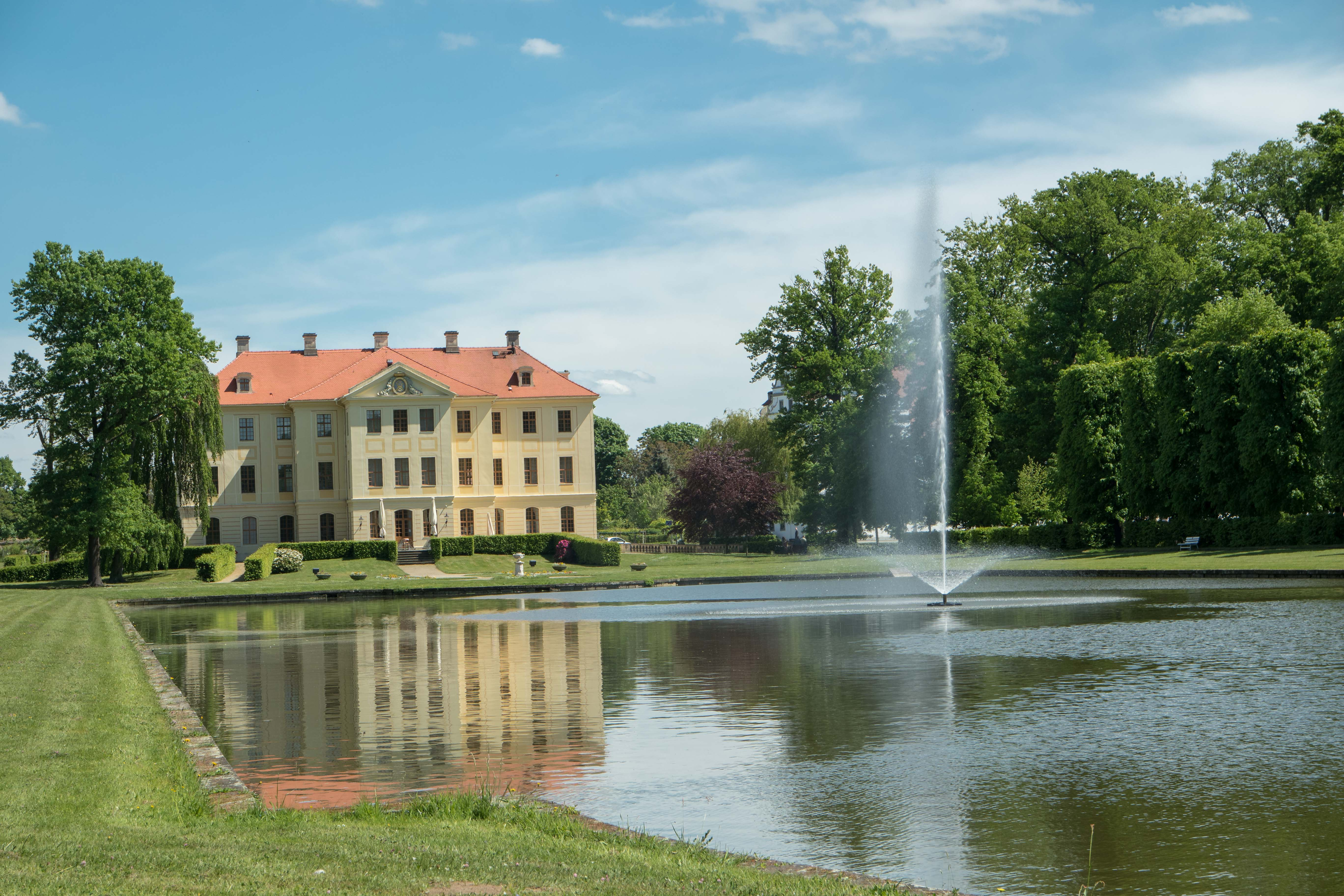
- Zabeltitz Palace

- Coat of arms
- Interactive map of Zabeltitz
- Location within Germany Location within Saxony
- Coordinates: 51°21′N 13°30′E
- Country: Germany
- State: Saxony
- District: Meißen
- Town: Großenhain
- Subdivisions: 10

Area
  - Total: 52.81 km^{2} (20.39 sq mi)
- Elevation: 113 m (371 ft)

Population (2006-12-31)
  - Total: 2,899
  - Density: 54.89/km^{2} (142.2/sq mi)
- Time zone: UTC+01:00 (CET)
  - Summer (DST): UTC+02:00 (CEST)
- Postal codes: 01561
- Dialling codes: 03522
- Vehicle registration: MEI
- Website: www.zabeltitz.de

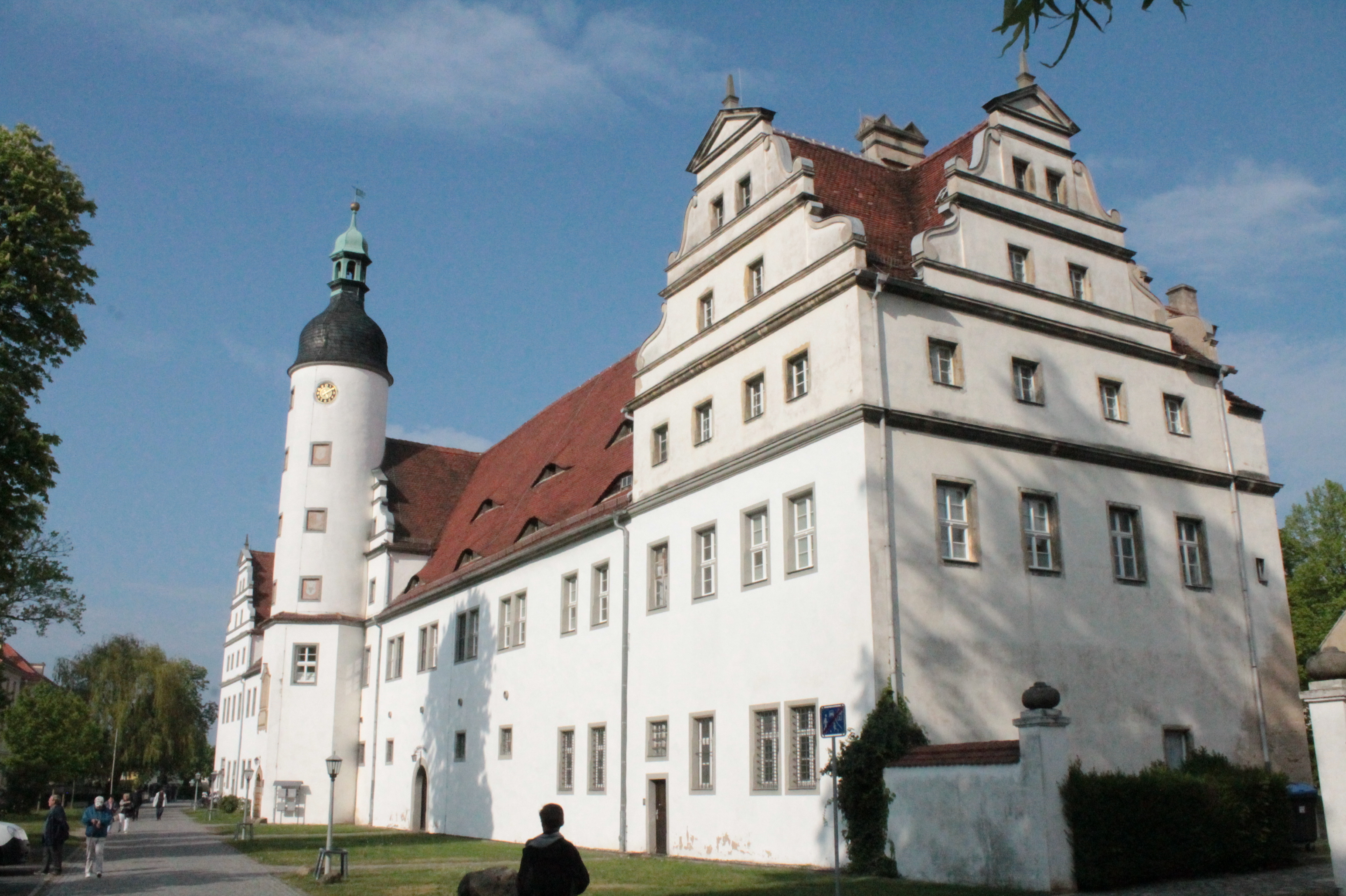
Schloss Zabeltitz

Zabeltitz is a former municipality in the district of Meißen, in Saxony, Germany. Since 1 January 2010, it is part of the town Großenhain.

It lies north of Meissen and Dresden and east of Leipzig. It is west of autobahn 101. It is served by a small railway which has a platform but no station building (around 1 km (0.62 mi) east of the village).

== Villages ==
Zabeltitz includes the following subdivisions:

- Görzig
- Krauschütz
- Nasseböhla
- Skäßchen
- Skaup
- Strauch
- Stroga
- Treugeböhla
- Uebigau

== History ==
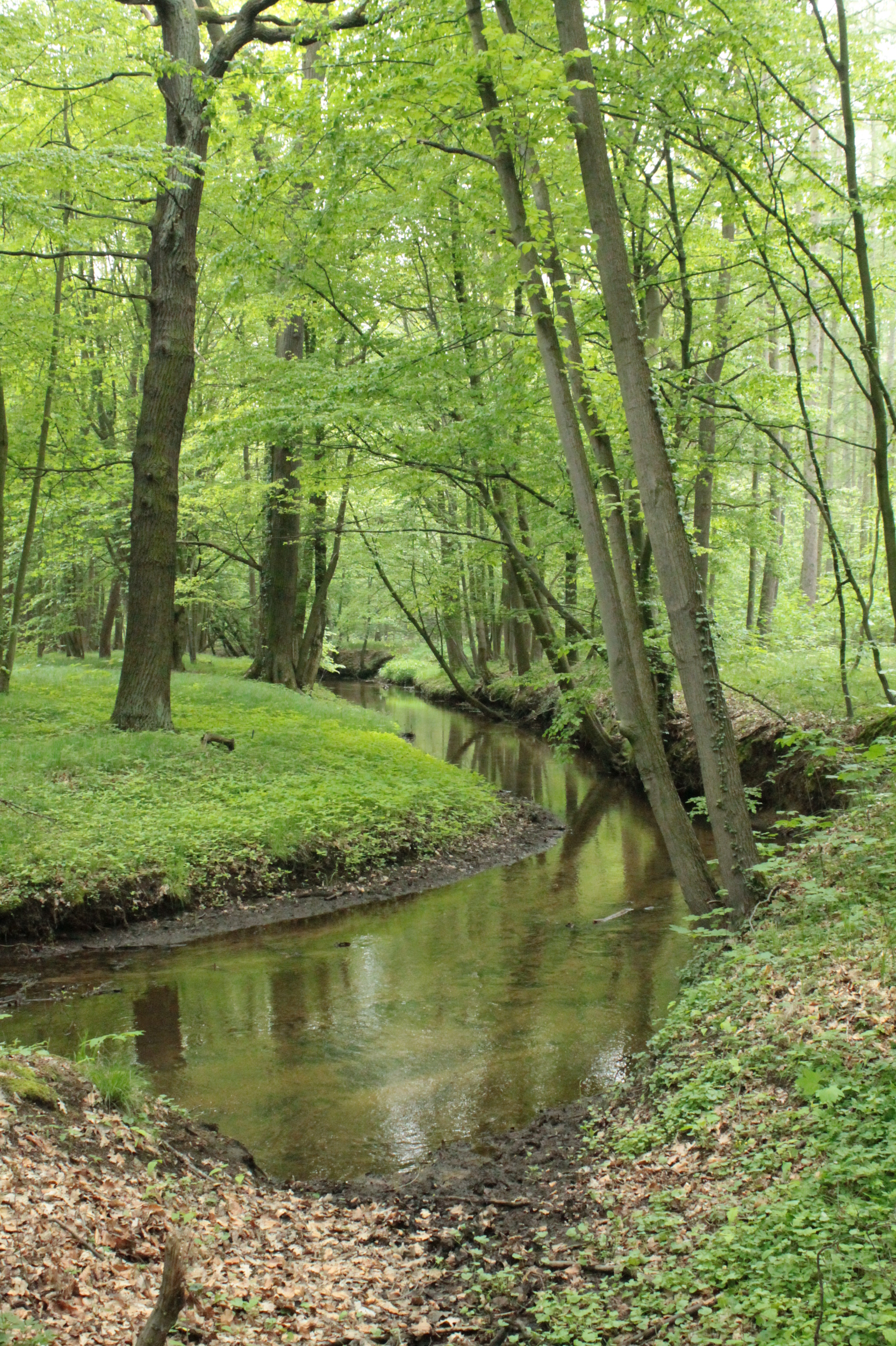
The woods at Zabeltitz in springtime

Zabeltitz was mentioned the first time in the year 1207. As with most surrounding settlements, the name of the village comes from Old Sorbian. It means "beyond the swamps."

In 1588 the estates of Schloss Zabeltitz were acquired by Christian I, Elector of Saxony who remodelled the castle to its current form in the Saxon Renaissance style. The castle was greatly damaged by the Swedish forces in 1637 during the Thirty Years War.

In 1728 the Zabeltitz Palais was built in the Baroque style, replacing an older Gothic castle, and formal ponds, fountains and gardens were added to the west. The gardens are known as the Barockgarten.

The railway was brought past the village in 1875.

== Sights ==
Tourist highlights are the "Barockgarten" and the "Bauernmuseum"; the church St. George and the old castle "Altes Schloß" of Zabeltitz, both built in gothic architecture style are also locations that are worth a visit, just as the Palais, which belongs to the "Barockgarten".

Extensive woods lie to the south west of the village and are fully accessible to the public. The waterways in the woods contain river otters and beavers.
