= II. documenta =

1959 art exhibition in Kassel, West Germany

II. documenta was the second edition of documenta, a quinquennial contemporary art exhibition. It was held between 11 July and 1 October 1959 in Kassel, West Germany. The artistic director was Arnold Bode in collaboration with art historian Werner Haftmann.

== Participants ==
A
René Acht	Henri-Georges Adam	Hans Aeschbacher	Afro (Afro Basaldella)	Gerhard Altenbourg
Karel Appel	Mordecai Ardon	Kenneth Armitage	Hans Arp
B
Francis Bacon	Vojin Bakić	Eduard Bargheer	Heinz Battke	Eugen Batz
Willi Baumeister	Jean Bazaine	William Baziotes	André Beaudin	Gustav Kurt Beck
Max Beckmann	Hans Bellmer	Anna-Eva Bergman	Hubert Berke	Gaston Bertrand
Max Bill	Renato Birolli	Julius Bissier	Roger Bissière	André Bloc
Norman Bluhm	Umberto Boccioni	Walter Bodmer	Anne Bonnet	Constantin Brâncuși
Georges Braque	Theo Braun	Victor Brauner	James Brooks	Peter Brüning
Carl Buchheister	Alberto Burri	Jan Burssens	Reg Butler
C
Alexander Calder	Alexander Camaro	Massimo Campigli	Giuseppe Capogrossi	Carmelo Cappello
Bruno Cassinari	Sergio de Castro	César Baldaccini	Lynn Chadwick	Marc Chagall
Bernard Childs	Eduardo Chillida	Giorgio de Chirico	Emil Cimiotti	Antoni Clavé
Henry Cliffe	Otto Coester	Pietro Consagra	Constant Nieuwenhuys	Corneille Guillaume Beverloo
Antonio Corpora	Pierre Courtin	Harold B. Cousins	Modest Cuixart
D
Karl Fred Dahmen	Alan Davie	Jean Degottex	Jacques Charles Delahaye	Robert Delaunay
Paul Delvaux	André Derain	Jean Deyrolle	Eugène Dodeigne	Piero Dorazio
Gianni Dova	Jean Dubuffet	Bernard Dufour
E
Theo Eble	Max Ernst	Maurice Estève	Merlyn Oliver Evans
F
Joseph Fassbender	Jean Fautrier	Pericle Fazzini	Franz Fedier	Luis Feito
Herbert Ferber	Lucio Fontana	Nino Franchina	Sam Francis	Helen Frankenthaler
Othon Friesz
G
Naum Gabo	Winfried Gaul	Rupprecht Geiger	Claude Georges	Jacques Germain
Alberto Giacometti	Émile Gilioli	Werner Gilles	Roger-Edgar Gillet	Michael Goldberg
Bruno Goller	Julio González	Arshile Gorky	Adolph Gottlieb	Karl Otto Götz
Otto Greis	HAP Grieshaber	Juan Gris	Marcel Gromaire	Philip Guston
H
Terry Haass	Roel D’Haese	Étienne Hajdú	Otto Herbert Hajek	Simon Hantaï
Fritz Harnest	Grace Hartigan	Hans Hartung	Karl Hartung	Rudolf Hausner
Stanley William Hayter	Bernhard Heiliger	Werner Heldt	Barbara Hepworth	Auguste Herbin
Peter Herkenrath	Ernst Hermanns	Anton Heyboer	Roger Hilton	Gerhard Hoehme
Rudolf Hoflehner	Hans Hofmann
I
Yūichi Inoue	Rolf Iseli
J
Robert Jacobsen	Franz M. Jansen	Guido Jendritzko	Asger Jorn
K
Wassily Kandinsky	Tadeusz Kantor	Zoltán Kemény	Eugène de Kermadec	Ernst Ludwig Kirchner
Heinrich Kirchner	Paul Klee	Franz Kline	Fritz Koenig	Max Kohler
Oskar Kokoschka	Willem de Kooning	Norbert Kricke	Rudolf Kügler
L
Wifredo Lam	Octave Landuyt	André Lanskoy	Peter Lanyon	Berto Lardera
Ibram Lassaw	Ger Lataster	Henri Laurens	Jan Lebenstein	Le Corbusier
Fernand Léger	Heinz Leinfellner	Jean Le Moal	Osvaldo Licini	Walter Linck
Jacques Lipchitz	Morice Lipsi	Seymour Lipton	Lucebert	Jean Lurçat
M
Alberto Magnelli	René Magritte	Kazimir Malevich	Alfred Manessier	Giacomo Manzù
Franz Marc	Conrad Marca-Relli	Gerhard Marcks	Adam Marczyński	André Marfaing
Marino Marini	Albert Marquet	André Masson	Umberto Mastroianni	Ewald Mataré
Georges Mathieu	Henri Matisse	Roberto Matta	Bernard Meadows	Matschinsky-Denninghoff
Georg Meistermann	Marc Mendelson	Ludwig Merwart	Hans Mettel	Henri Michaux
Leone Minassian	Luciano Minguzzi	Mirko Basaldella	Joan Miró	Joan Mitchell
Piet Mondrian	Henry Moore	Giorgio Morandi	Mattia Moreni	Ennio Morlotti
Richard Mortensen	Robert Motherwell	Max von Mühlenen	Robert Müller	Willi Müller-Hufschmid
Edo Murtić	Zoran Mušič
N
Ernst Wilhelm Nay	Renee Nele	Endre Nemes	Rolf Nesch	Barnett Newman
Ben Nicholson	Isamu Noguchi	Sidney Nolan	Emil Nolde
O
Richard Oelze	Christian d’Orgeix	Fayga Ostrower
P
Eduardo Paolozzi	Victor Pasmore	Alicia Penalba	Achille Perilli	Antoine Pevsner
Jean Piaubert	Pablo Picasso	Édouard Pignon	Arthur Luiz Piza	Hans Platschek
Serge Poliakoff	Jackson Pollock	Arnaldo Pomodoro	Giò Pomodoro	Piotr Potworowski
Richard Pousette-Dart	Mario Prassinos
R
Robert Rauschenberg	Paul Rebeyrolle	Germaine Richier	Fritz Riedl	Jean-Paul Riopelle
Günter Ferdinand Ris	Otto Ritschl	Kurt Roesch	Gerburg Rohde	Hans Rompel
Theodore Roszak	Mark Rothko	Georges Rouault
S
Rolf Sackenheim	Giuseppe Santomaso	Antonio Saura	Emilio Scanavino	Karl Schaper
Edwin Scharff	Oskar Schlemmer	Gérard Ernest Schneider	Nicolas Schöffer	Bernard Schultze
Emil Schumacher	Kurt Schwitters	Toti Scialoja	William Scott	André Dunoyer de Segonzac
Gustav Seitz	Jaroslaw Serpan	Michel Seuphor	Ben Shahn	Josef Šíma
Gustave Singier	Mario Sironi	David Smith	K.R.H. Sonderborg	Pierre Soulages
Luigi Spazzapan	Ferdinand Springer	Toni Stadler	Nicolas de Staël	François Stahly
Theodoros Stamos	Clyfford Still	Gabrijel Stupica	Kumi Sugai	Graham Sutherland
Arpad Szenès
T
Shinkichi Tajiri	Pierre Tal-Coat	Rufino Tamayo	Yves Tanguy	Dorothea Tanning
Antoni Tàpies	Yūkei Tejima	Fred Thieler	Mark Tobey	Bradley Walker Tomlin
Hann Trier	Heinz Trökes	Drago Tršar	Giulio Turcato	Ann Twardowicz
Jack Tworkov
U
Raoul Ubac	Hans Uhlmann
V
Louis Van Lint	Victor Vasarely	Emilio Vedova	Geer van Velde	Alberto Viani
Maria Helena Vieira da Silva	Jacques Villon	Friedrich Vordemberge-Gildewart
W
Gerhard Wendland	Hans Werdehausen	Theodor Werner	Gerhard Wind	Fritz Winter
Karl Anton Wolf	Wols	Fritz Wotruba	Woty Werner	Bryan Wynter
Y
Taihô Yamazaki
Z
Ossip Zadkine	Mac Zimmermann	Unica Zürn
