= Bernard Childs =

American painter (1910–1985)

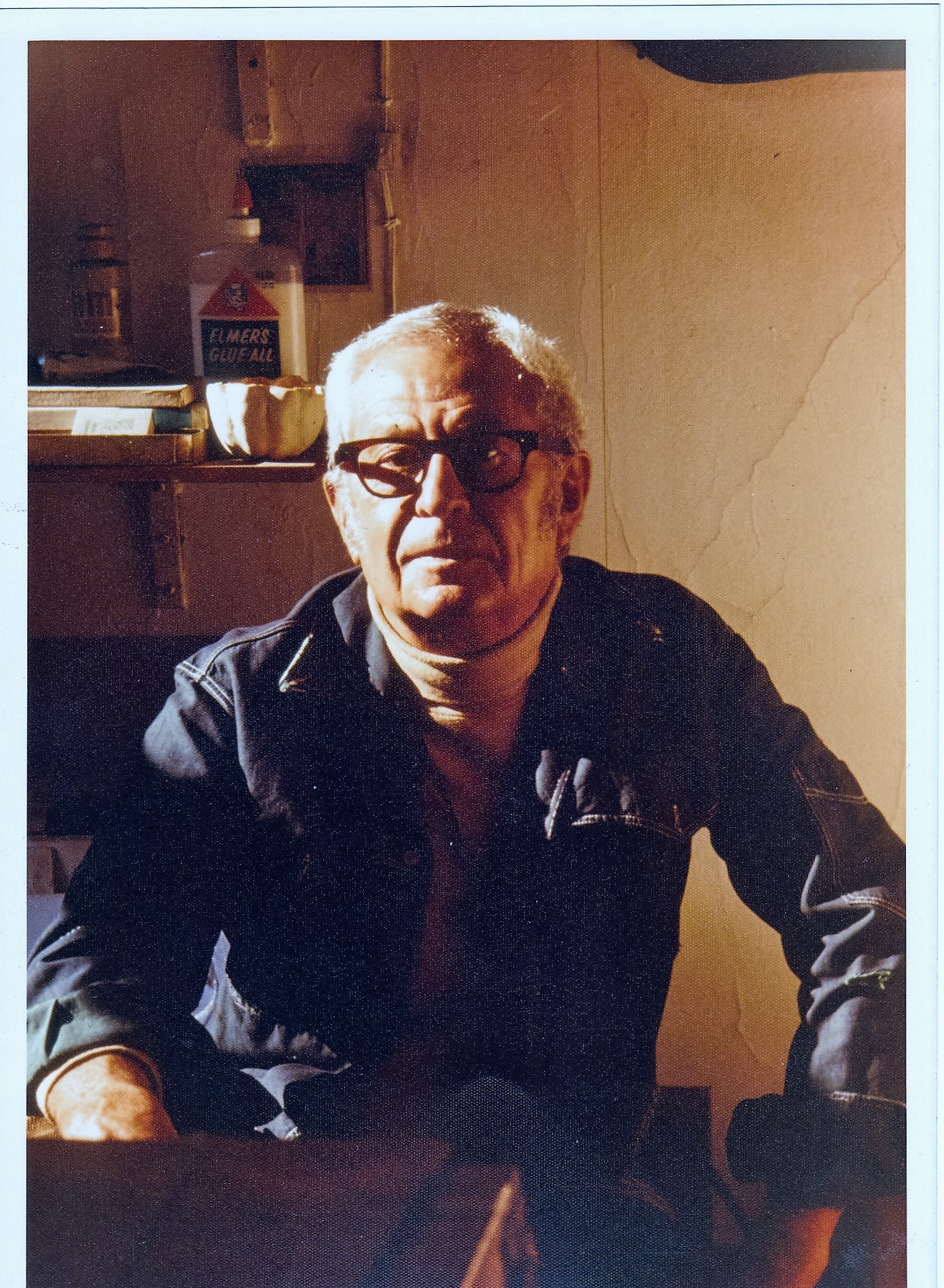
- Bernard Childs, Hotel Chelsea, 1977

Bernard Childs (1910–1985) was an artist who worked in Paris and New York. He was primarily a painter and printmaker, and pioneered the direct engraving of metal plates with power tools. As a kind of counterpoint to his many-layered work, which is often symbolic and a fusion of abstraction and figuration, in 1959 he also started painting portraits. Childs' formal interests were line and space, light and color, and the dialogue of contrasting elements.

== Life ==
He first found his vocation in high school, in Harrisburg, Pennsylvania where his Russian immigrant parents had moved the family from his birthplace, Brooklyn. During her last days, his mother told him he was the seventh generation of artists in the family, his forebears having been painters of icons in the churches of Yaroslav.

In 1928, a scholarship took him to the University of Pennsylvania. He left two years later for New York where he worked by day and studied at night with Kimon Nicolaїdes at The Art Students League in New York. He also had the luck to meet the great Danish silversmith Peer Smed, from whom he learned his love of metal.

The economic and social problems of the 1930s took Childs away from his work as an artist, until he began drawing again in the South Pacific while serving as a quartermaster aboard the destroyer escort USS Wesson, during World War II. Childs survived a Kamikaze attack and, at war's end, two years of intermittent hospitalization after returning to New York. His recovery was complete by 1947, the year he studied with Amédée Ozenfant, who became a good friend. In 1951, thanks to the G.I. Bill, he sailed for Italy where he began his full-time life as an artist. It was there that he met and became friends with Alberto Burri and Enrico Baj.

Following a year in Perugia and in Rome and his first solo exhibition, at the venerable Galleria dell'Obellisco, Childs settled in Paris, realizing his first mature painting at age 42 and quickly becoming part of the European vanguard. He was included in many exhibitions of the Paris salons, various galleries such as Ariel and Iris Clert, Galerie Parnass in Wuppertal and the free floating group Phases along with Alechinsky, Baj, Cousins, Ernst, Fahlström, Fontana, Lam, Jaffe, Pederson, Soulages, Yasse Tabuchi, and Tajiri. He was championed by the French art critics Pierre Restany and Édouard Jaguer, and the Swedish art historian and curator Ragnar von Holten.

Bernard Childs, The Critic (Portrait of Pierre Restany), 1959, Oil on canvas.

By 1959 he was in Documenta II and had his first solo museum exhibition, of paintings and prints, at the Stedelijk Museum in Amsterdam. It was in early 1955, after a month in December 1954 at Atelier 17, that he had signed his first editions of prints and begun pioneering the direct engraving of metal plates with power tools for which he is well recognized. Childs was also one of the first post World War II Western artists invited to show in Japan where he had two exhibitions, of paintings and of prints in 1960 and 1961 respectively at the Tokyo Gallery, and received the Museum of Western Art Award at the 1961 Tokyo International Print Biennial.

From 1966 to 1977, Childs commuted between his Paris studio and his New York studio at the Hotel Chelsea. In 1969, a retrospective of his 1960's paintings, prints and engraved acrylic light sculptures was held at the Storm King Art Center in Mountainville, NY. This exhibition was the occasion for the first public view of his light sculptures – laminates of engraved sheets of acrylic lit from below – an experiment with light and color that he began the same year and continued through part of the 1970s. Although a stroke in 1978 interrupted his career, Childs never stopped drawing and soon resumed painting, remaining in New York until his death at age 74 in March 1985.

Although he exhibited extensively in group shows, Childs was a loner. A renowned curator once called him a "rogue artist", one who cannot be defined by a category, a group, or a decade. Often a fusion of abstraction and figuration, at times paralleled by portraiture, his is a body of work rooted in the second half of the 20th century and whose ongoing appeal defies time.

Bernard Childs, How Green Is My Belly, 1965, Oil and graphite on linen, 24 x 19 inches

== Formal interests and underlying stories ==
Themes of survival, including war and environmental disaster were recurrent in Childs' work. Ancient insect species became a recurring motif, symbolizing survival. He drew their movements and strength up close and in his 1970's paintings depicted them exploring outer space for a new home, should planet Earth no longer support life. His work reflected his interest in the survival of the planet and life, as well as, in creation myths, world mytholoogy, and literary myths.

Childs' formal concerns were line and space, light and color, and the dialogue of contrasting elements related in time but often projecting different spatial environments. Portraiture and figuration of one kind or another are ever present, overtly or woven into abstractions. Childs took a sensual pleasure in his materials and a sensual, witty approach to many of the visual stories he told. His erotic stories of love are tender and sometimes funny. Danger is reflected in both his memories of war and his warnings of future dangers such as nuclear holocaust.

== Most influential travels ==
- South Pacific and Hawaii in WWII
- Italy, 1951–1952
- France, 1952–1977
- Spain, several visits beginning in 1957
- Hawaii, Japan, Far East, Asia, Egypt 1960–1961
- Germany, 1957–1966
- Sweden, 1952 and 1970
- Puerto Rico, 1966–1984

=== Solo exhibitions ===
2026 ---BANK New York, The Armory Show

2019 – Jason McCoy Gallery (Online Exhibition)

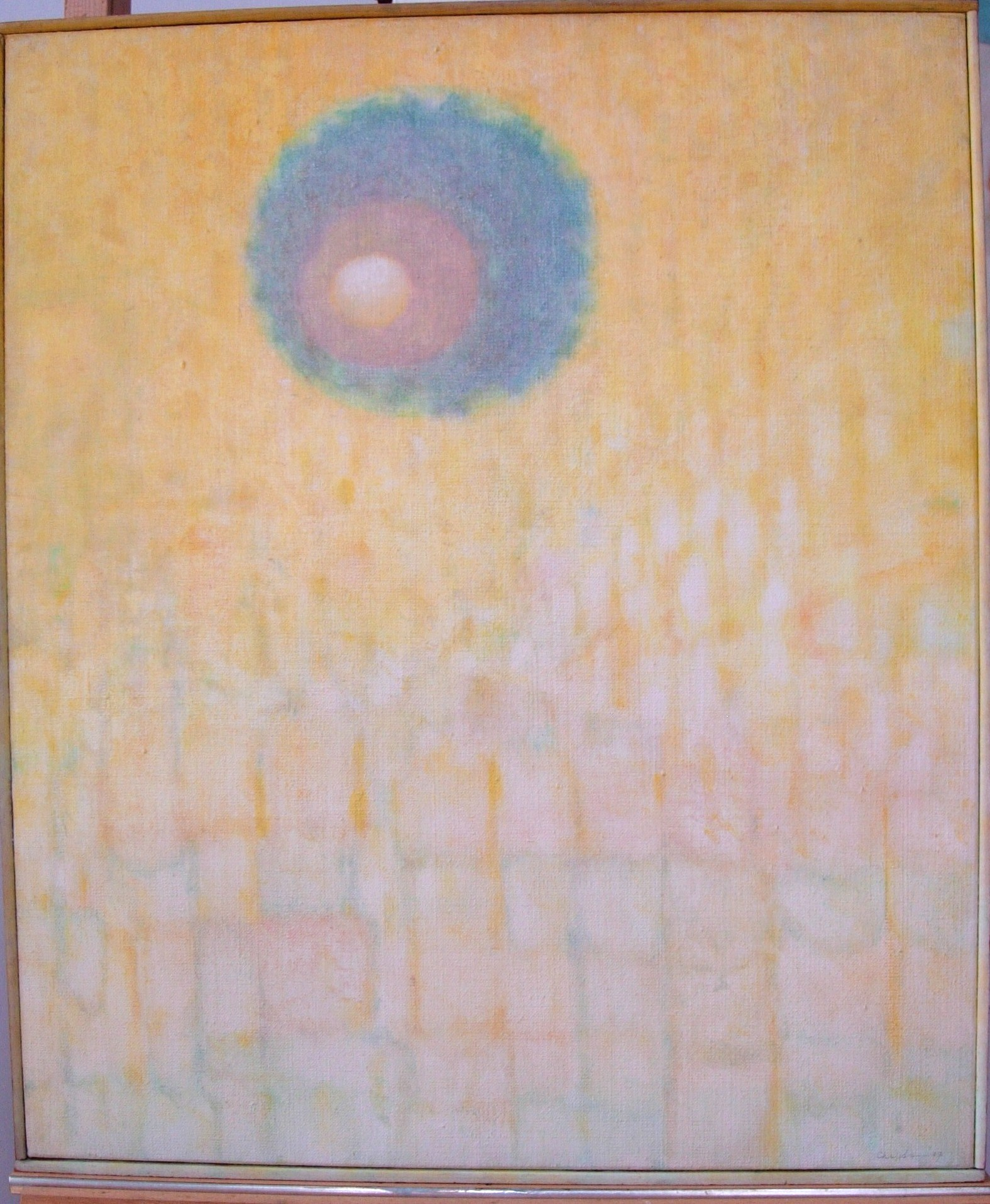
Bernard Childs, Flowers of the Sun, 1977, Oil on canvas, 21 5/8 x 18 1/4 inches

2017 – Anders Wahlstedt Fine Art, New York,
2013 – Jason McCoy Gallery, New York
2012 – Jason McCoy Gallery, New York
1994 – Hirschl & Adler Galleries, New York
1994 – Hirschl & Adler Galleries, New York
1988 – Hirschl & Adler Galleries, New York
1986 – Galerie Alfred Kren, Cologne
1985 – Palazzo Soriani, Biblioteche Pubbliche Comunali, Milan
1982 – Honolulu Academy of Arts, Honolulu
1973 – New Bertha Schaefer Gallery, New York
1971 – Whitney Museum of American Art, New York
1969 – Storm King Art Center, Mountainville, NY
1968 – Boston Public Library, Boston
1967 – Galerie Aronowitsch, Stockholm
1966 – Weyhe Gallery, New York
1964 – New York University, New York
1964 – Galerie der Editions Rothe, Heidenberg
1963 – Transair, Malmo
1962 – Galerie St Germain, Paris
1961 – Roopa Gallery, Bombay
1961 – National Gallery of Modern Art, New Delhi
1961 – Académie des Beaux Arts, Djogjakarta
1961 – Academy of Fine Arts, Bangkok
1961 – University of Hawaii, Honolulu
1961 – Tokyo Gallery, Tokyo
1960 – Tokyo Gallery, Tokyo
1959 – Galerie Ariel, Paris
1959 – Stedelijk Museum, Amsterdam
1958 – Galerie Parnass, Wuppertal
1958 – Print Club, Philadelphia
1958 – Galerie Inge Ahlers, Mannheim
1957 – George M. Wittenborn, New York
1956 – Nordisk Kunsthandel – Galerie d'Art Moderne, Copenhagen
1956 – Galerie Kléber, Paris
1955 – Zimmergalerie Franck, Frankfurt-am-Main
1953 – Galerie Breteau, Paris
1952 – Galeria Obelisco, Rome

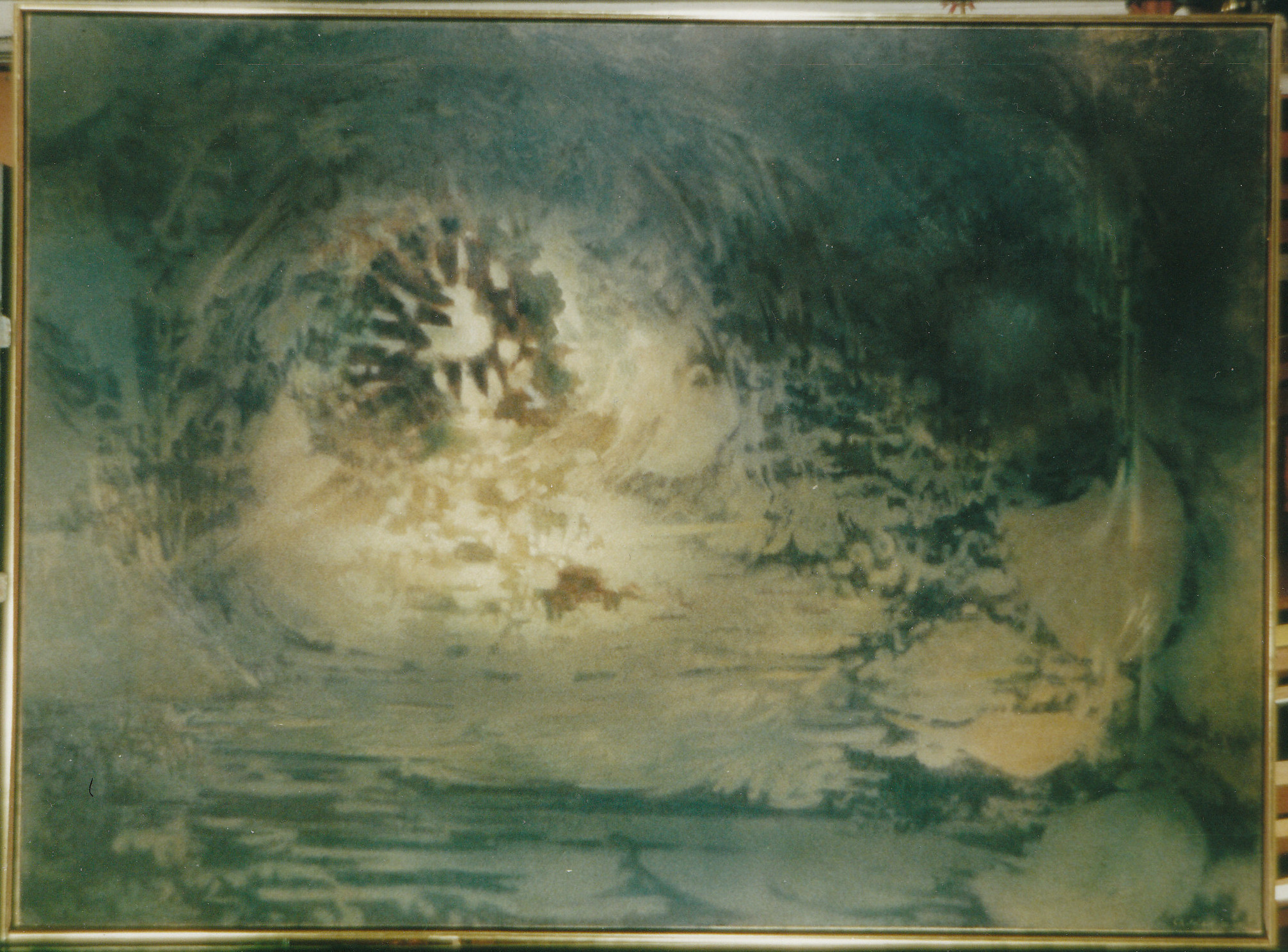
Bernard Childs, The Oracle, 1957, Oil, 43 x 59 inches

=== Selected group exhibitions ===
2025 - Americans in Paris: Artist's Working in Post-War France, 1946-1962, Addison Gallery, Andover, MA, Sept 3-Jan 5, 2025
Americans in Paris: Artist's Working in Post-War France, 1946-1962, The NYU Abu Dhabi Art Gallery, Ab Dhabi, Feb 11-Jun 1,2025
2024 – Americans in Paris: Artist's Working in Post-War France, 1946-1962, Grey Art Museum, New York, Feb 26-Jul 5, 2024
2023 - Hotel Chelsea Tribute Exhibition, "I Remember You Well at The Chelsea Hotel", Fleiss-Valois, New York, Dec 1-23, 2023
2021 – ARMOR, Jason McCoy Gallery, New York
2018 – Selections from the Department of Drawings and Prints: Hidden and Displayed, Metropolitan Museum of Art, New York, November 1, 2018 – January 27, 2019 ("Barcarolle", 1958, printing plate and two variant impressions)
2016 – BLACK & WHITE: Modern and Contemporary Positions, Jason McCoy Gallery, New York
2013 – American Gestures: Abstract Expressionism, Museum of Fine Arts, Boston
2013 – Atelier 17: Women Artists and Avant-Garde Prints, The Metropolitan Museum of Art, New York.
2012 – Paper Bend, Jason McCoy Gallery, New York
2010 – Galaxy Cosmos, Jason McCoy Gallery, New York
2009 – The Pull of Experiment: Postwar American Printmaking, Yale University Art Gallery, New Haven, Connecticut.
2007 – Options within Realism, Jason McCoy Gallery, New York
2006 – Abstract Expressionist Prints from the Charles Randall Dean Collection, Pollock-Krasner House and Study Center, East Hampton, New York.
2005 – Sets, Series, and Suites: Contemporary Prints, Museum of Fine Arts, Boston
2003 – Expressive Impressions, Three Decades of Abstract American Prints, Cummer Museum of Art and Gardens, Jacksonville, FL
2003 – Mid-Century Graphics, Museum of Fine Arts, Boston, Massachusetts.
2001–2003 – The Stamp of Impulse Abstract Expressionist Prints, Worcester Art Museum, Worcester; Traveled to The Cleveland Museum of Art, Cleveland; Amon Carter Museum, Fort Worth; The Parrish Art Museum, Southampton, NY; Mary and Leigh Block Museum of Art, Northwestern University, Evanston
1999 – Omens of Millenium, Pacifico Fine Art, New York
1990 – A Spectrum of Innovation, Color in American Printmaking 1890–1960. Worcester Art Museum, Worcester, MA
1985 – The Spontaneous Gesture, Australian National Gallery, Canberra
1982 – Treffpunkt Parnass, International Avant-Garde at Galerie Parnass, Wuppertal, 1949–65: Goethe Institut, Paris; Musées de la Ville de Bourges, Bourges; Goethe House, London and Edinburgh.
1976 – New York '76, Riksutstalliningar, Stockholm and elsewhere in Sweden
1976 – Tokyo International Print Biennial, Tokyo
1967 – Premio International Biella per l'incisione, Biella
1966 – Whitney Annual, Whitney Museum of American Art, New York

1963–1964 - Salon des Nouvelles Réalités, Paris
1962/1960 – International Prints, Cincinnati Art Museum, Cincinnati, Ohio
1960/59/58 Galérie Ariel, Paris
1959 – Documenta II, Kassel
1958 – Americans in Europe, University of Wisconsin, Madison, Beloit, Racine
1958/1957 – Galérie du Dragon, Paris

1956–1964 – Salon des Comparaisons, Paris

1955 – 1959 – "Phases" (Multiple venues)
1955 – Peintres américains en France 1955 oeuvres récentes, American Legion Paris Post No. 1, Paris
1955 – Exposizione Il Gesto, Rassegna Internazionale delle forme libere, Galeria Schettini, Milan

1953–1959 – Salon des Réalités Nouvelles, Paris

== Selected public collections ==
- Addison Gallery of American Art, Andover, Massachusetts
- Bibliothèque nationale de France, Paris
- Ishibashi Foundation, Tokyo (formerly the Bridgestone Gallery)
- Brooklyn Museum, Brooklyn, New York
- Grey Art Museum, New York University, New York
- Hood Museum of Art, Hanover, New Hampshire
- Israel Museum, Jerusalem
- Metropolitan Museum of Art, New York
- Museum of Fine Arts, Boston
- Moderna Museet, Stockholm
- National Portrait Gallery, Stockholm
- National Portrait Gallery, Washington, DC
- The National Museum of Western Art, Tokyo
- Princeton University Museum of Art, Princeton, New Jersey
- San Francisco Fine Arts Museums, Palace of the Legion of Honor, Achenbach Foundation for Graphic Arts
- Smith College Museum of Art & the Mortimer Rare Book Room, Northampton, Massachusetts
- Stedelijk Museum, Amsterdam
- The Hyde Collection, Glens Fall, New York
- The Library of Congress, Washington D.C.
- The Butler Institute of American Art, Youngstown, Ohio
- The Jane Voorhes Zimmerli Art Museum, Rutgers, New Brunswick, New Jersey
- Whitney Museum of American Art, New York
- Worcester Art Museum, Worcester, Massachusetts
- Yale University Art Museum, New Haven, Connecticut
- The Harvard Art Museums, Cambridge, Massachusetts

== Selected publications ==
- "Americans in Paris: Artists working in Postwar France. 1946-1962", published by Grey Art Museum, NYU, New York, 2022
- "Catalogue of the Collection, Ishibashi Foundation, 1952–2018", published by Artizon Museum, Tokyo, 2019
- "Hotel Chelsea: Living in the Last Bohemian Haven", published by The Monacelli Press, New York, 2019
- "Bernard Childs: The Process of Becoming Oneself", Jason McCoy Gallery, New York, February, essay by Stephanie Buhmann, 2013.
- "Sets, Series and Suites: Contemporary Prints", Museum of Fine Arts, Boston, January 19-May 29, exhibition catalogue with essay by Clifford S. Ackley, 2005.
- "The Spiritual in Twentieth Century Art", by Roger Lipsey. Dover Publications, Inc., Mineola, New York, 2004.
- "The Stamp of Impulse, Abstract Expressionist Prints", by David Acton, with essays by David Amram and David Lehman; Worcester Art Museum in association with Snoeck, Ducaju & Zoon. Catalogue for five museums touring exhibition, 2001–2003
- "Fresh Impressions, American Abstract Prints of the 1940s, 50s and 60s from the collection of Charles R. Dean", The Cantor Fitzgerald Gallery, Haverford College, Haverford, Pennsylvania, 2001
- "Recent Acquisitions of American Prints", Fitzwilliam Museum, Cambridge, U.K. Exhibition checklist with foreword by Duncan Robinson and Craig Hartley, 1999
- "Art Bulletin of the National Museum Stockholm", Stockholm Vol. 4, 1997; essay by Ragnar von Holten, "Portrait of Eric Grate", 1997
- "A Spectrum of Innovation, Color in American Printmaking 1890–1960" by David Acton with contributions by Clinton Adams and Karen F. Beall, Worcester Art Museum, Worcester, W.W. Norton & Company, New York, London. Catalog for touring exhibition 1990
- "The Prints of Bernard Childs" by Janet A. Flint, Hirschl & Adler Galleries Inc., New York, 1988
- "The Spontaneous Gesture, Prints and Books of the Abstract Expressionist Era", by Lanier Graham, Australian National Gallery, Canberra, 1987
- "Treffpunkt Parnass, International Avant-Garde" at Galerie Parnass, Wuppertal 1949–65, (Catalogue for Goethe Institute touring exhibition, Paris, Bourges, London, Edinburgh), 1982
- American Prints and Printmakers", by Una E. Johnson, Doubleday & Company, Inc., Garden City, New York, 1980
- "Connaissance des Arts", Paris, May 1976, No. 291. Cover story with article by Jean-Marie Drot, "Bernard Childs, une revolution dans l'art de la gravure" and a Childs experimental print commissioned for this issue. "From Lexington and Concord to La Bastille with love", 1976
- Jolifanto Rambla, Ragnar von Holten. Bo Cavefors Bokförlag, Lund . "Bernard Childs' teckenvärld", 1976
- "Irish Strategies", Dolman Press, Dublin, Ireland, 1975
- "Bernard Childs, Paintings & Images in Light", March 13–31, 1973 New Bertha Schaefer Gallery, New York, 1973
- Artist's Proof, Vol. 10, The Pratt Graphic Center, New York. "Tropical Noon: High Speed Presses and the Unlimited Edition" by Bernard Childs, with introduction by "Editor," and original color letterpress print, 1970
- "Bernard Childs, Paintings/Prints/Images in Light", Una E. Johnson, Storm King Art Center, Mountainville, New York, catalogue for exhibition (July 26 – October 31, 1969); 1969
- Konstrevy, Stockholm, Häfte No. 4, Stockholm;Ragnar von Holten: "Bernard Childs: En Värld av Tecken", 1966
- "Bernard Childs: Exhibition of paintings, engravings and drawings," New York University Art Collection, Washington Square, with essay by Howard Conant, 1964
- Art International, Lugano VII/4, May 1964; "Bernard Childs, Le Signe Transformé en Paysage", by Ragnar v Holten, 1964
- "Bernard Childs Ole Wachsbilder Farbtuschen Druckgraphik, 24 Januar bis 15 März 1964", Galerie der Edition Rothe, Heidelberg exhibition brochure with essay by Una E. Johnson, 1964
- "Grimace, 1962–67" by Erro; sound collaboration by François Dufrene: 16 mm black & white film with sound 42 minutes; about 100 close ups of artists making exaggerated faces, including Childs blowing his nose; transferred to DVD by Galérie Berggruen & cie. in 1994; exhibited at Grey Art Gallery, New York as part of their "Art of Erro" exhibition in 2004
- "Idea", Vol. 8 No.46, Apr 1961 Tokyo: "BERNARD CHILDS" 13 pages, 23 reproductions. 1961
- "Geijutsu Shincho", Tokyo; November or December; transcript of several hour interview with Childs by Shinichi Segui and an editor, 1960
- "Childs", Tokyo Gallery, Tokyo, with preface by John Gordon, Curator, Whitney Museum of American Art, 1960
- "La Lune en Rodage I", Editions Panderma, Basel, 1960.
- "La Lune en Rodage", Editions Panderma, Basel, 1959
- "Bernard Childs", Stedelijk Museum, Amsterdam, November 1959, catalogue no. 219, exhibition catalogue with introduction essay by Childs, 1959
- "Art International", Vol III/9: "Bernard Childs, un langage de notre temps" by Pierre Restany, 1959
- "Edda" No. 1 été 1958, Brussels: "Bernard Childs ou l'émotion en lumière polarisée" by Edouard Jaguer, 1958
- "Contemporary American Painting and Sculpture", University of Illinois, Urbana, 1957
- "Phases Phasen", Stedelijk Museum Amsterdam catalogue no. 172, 10 mei – 10 juni '57, with essays by Edouard Jaguer, Pierre Alechinsky, François Arnal and Ghérasim Luca, 1957
- "Arte Visive" 10, rivista della fondazione "Origine", Rome, 1954

== Contact ==
- Estate of Bernard Childs: c/o Judith Childs | Hotel Chelsea | 222 West 23rd Street | New York, NY | 10011
