= Christian Friedrich Fritzsche =

German Protestant theologian (1776–1850)

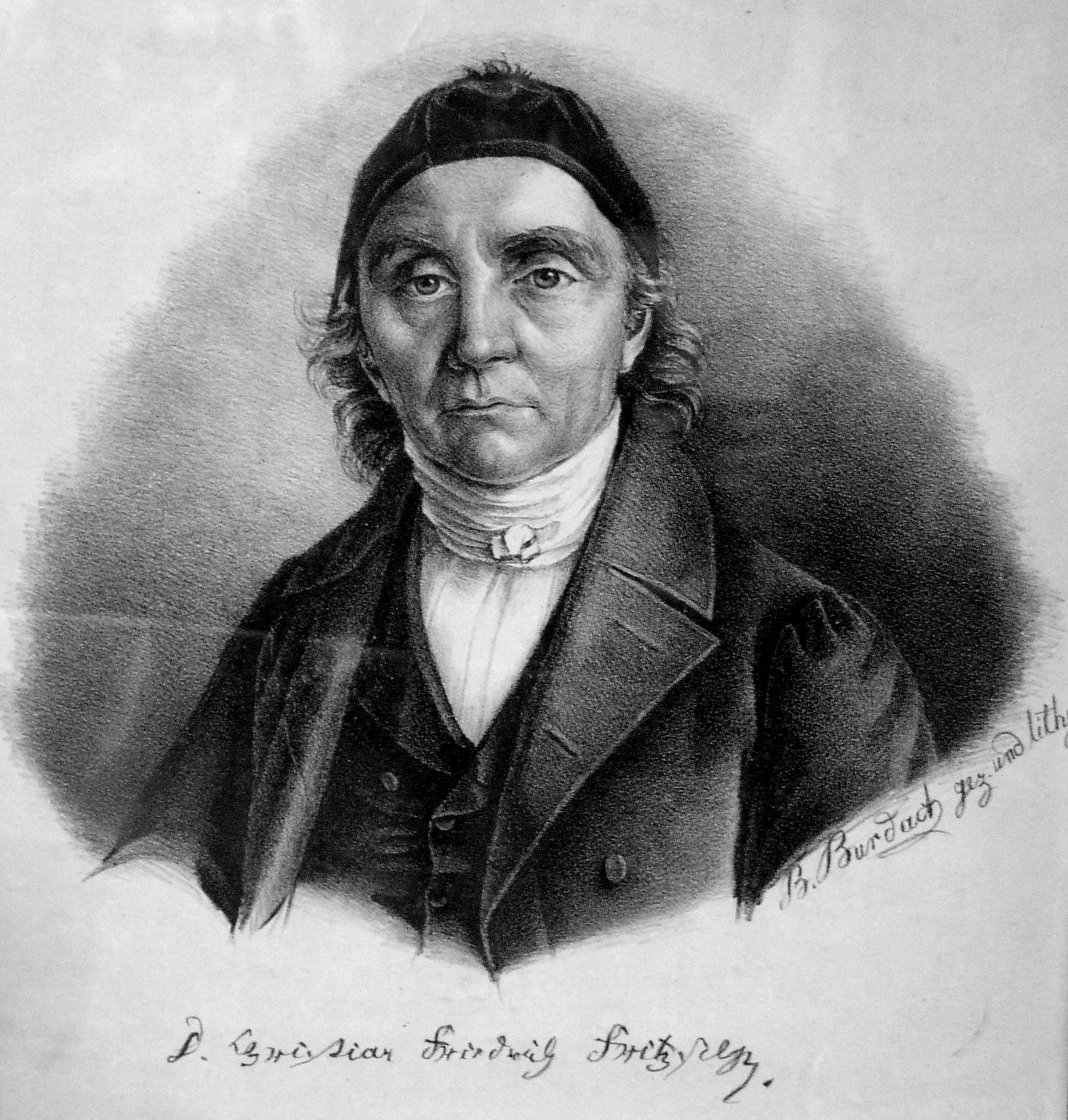
- Born: 17 August 1776; Naundorf, Electorate of Saxony
- Died: 29 October 1850 (aged 74); Zürich, Switzerland
- Education: University of Halle
- Notable work: Nova opuscula academica (1846)
- Children: Otto Fridolinus Fritzsche; Franz Volkmar Fritzsche
- Theological work
- Main interests: Supernaturalism

Christian Friedrich Fritzsche (17 August 1776 in Naundorf near Zeitz – 29 October 1850 in Zürich) was a German Protestant theologian. He was the father of theologian Otto Fridolinus Fritzsche and of philologist Franz Volkmar Fritzsche.

From 1792 he studied theology at the University of Halle, afterwards working as a pastor in Steinbach und Lauterbach (from 1799). In 1809 he became a preacher and superintendent in the community of Dobrilugk. In 1827 he was named an honorary professor of theology at Halle, where in 1830 he gained a full professorship. He was interested in public school education, and he wrote monographs and articles on contemporary theological issues from a supernaturalistic viewpoint.

== Published works ==
In 1838 a collection of his writings were published with the title, Fritzschiorum opuscula academica. Later on, a collection of his writings were issued as Nova opuscula academica (1846). The following is a list of a few of his writings:

- "De revelationis notione biblia commentatio", 1828.
- "De spiritu sancto commentatio exegetica et dogmatica", 1840.
- "De ratione docendi Socratica in institutione academica", 1846.
