= Lataster =

Lataster is a surname. Notable people with the surname include:

- Ger Lataster (1920–2012), Dutch painter
- Jef Lataster (1922–2014), Dutch long-distance runner
