= René Acht =

Swiss painter and graphic artist

- Born: 24 March 1920; Basel, Switzerland
- Died: 3 May 1998 (aged 78); Herbolzheim, Germany
- Known for: Painting, graphic art, sculpture
- Movement: Informel

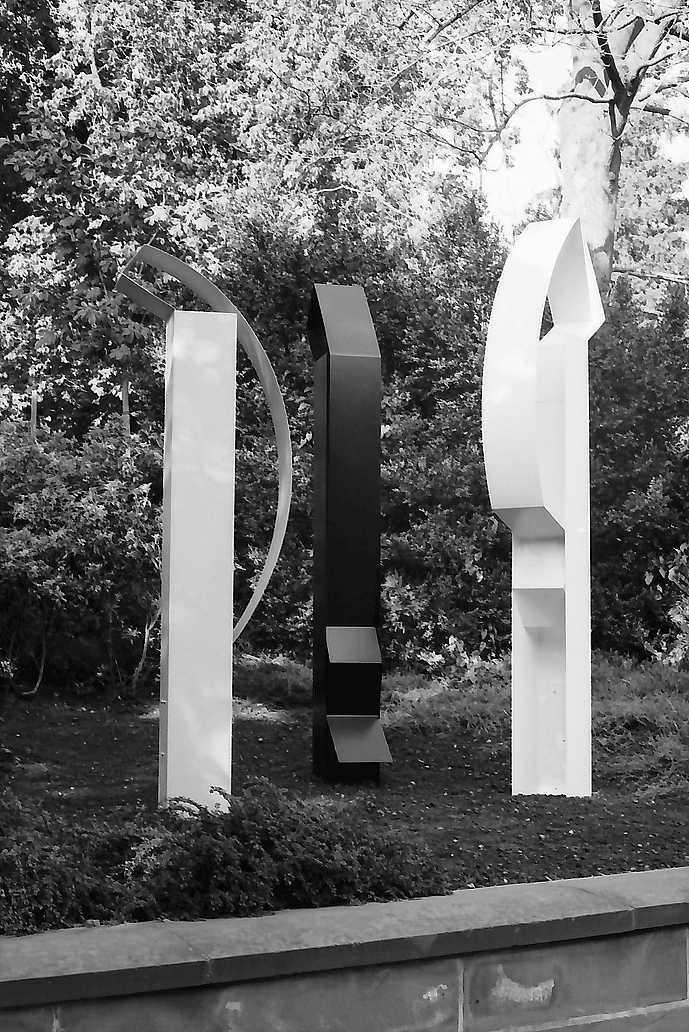
Gespräch, a sculpture by René Acht in Freiburg, 1975

René Acht (24 March 1920 – 3 May 1998) was a Swiss painter, graphic artist and sculptor. Trained in his native Basel, he became known for Informel works in the 1950s and was included in documenta II in Kassel and the 5th São Paulo Biennial in 1959. He moved away from Informel in the early 1960s and later made abstract-geometric paper cuts and folded works.

== Biography ==
Acht was born on 24 March 1920 in Basel. He trained at the Kunstgewerbeschule Basel from 1936 to 1940, studying painting, graphic art, sculpture and metalworking, and also worked in his father's gravestone business.

After moving to Geneva in 1945, Acht returned to Basel in 1948. In 1952, he began a teaching career that lasted around forty years, with appointments in Basel, Hamburg and Freiburg im Breisgau. During this period, his teaching income, grants and art sales enabled repeated stays in Paris and longer travels, including to Japan in 1974 and China in 1982.

Acht settled in Freiburg im Breisgau in 1972. In 1978, he married Bärbel Geigele. He founded the Art-Club + Kunstforum in 1976 and later co-founded E-Werk – Hallen für Kunst in 1987 and the Vereinigung konstruktive kunst am oberrhein in 1990. He died in Herbolzheim, Germany, on 3 May 1998.

== Work ==
Acht's early work included copies of old masters and realistic subjects such as landscapes, interiors, portraits and nudes. During the 1940s, he began developing a more modern visual language influenced by Expressionism and Cubism. By around 1949, he had turned to non-representational ink drawings.

Acht first gained wider recognition through Informel works. In 1959, he was represented at documenta II in Kassel and at the 5th São Paulo Biennial. He moved away from Informel in the early 1960s and developed a more independent form of abstraction.

For the years 1951 to 1955, Acht used the term "lyrisch-konkret" and described the phase with the words "non-representational", "Zen" and "Bissier". His 1951 meeting with Julius Heinrich Bissier led to a long friendship. Acht also became more interested in Zen Buddhism and East Asian philosophy

Around 1965, Acht began combining constructive and abstract forms. The house becoming a recurring symbol in his work. His later "lyrisch-konkret" visual language included abstract-geometric paper cuts and folded works. It was influenced by Concrete art, East Asian thought, mysticism, alchemy, astrology and astronomy. From the late 1960s, he made paper cuts by hand from black paper or card, using simple forms such as rectangles, circles and triangles.

== Exhibitions ==
From October 2021 to January 2022, the Kunstmuseum Singen held an exhibition of Acht's work. It was part of a joint project with the Wilhelm-Hack-Museum in Ludwigshafen and the Aargauer Kunsthaus in Aarau. The exhibition presented around 160 works, including paintings, gouaches, drawings, paper cuts and sculptures. From November 2022 to February 2023, the Wilhelm-Hack-Museum presented the exhibition René Acht – Lyrisch-Konkret. From January to March 2023, the Aargauer Kunsthaus presented thirteen paintings and paper cuts by Acht from the 1950s to the 1980s, acquired through two donations.
