= Otto Fridolinus Fritzsche =

German theologian (1812–1896)

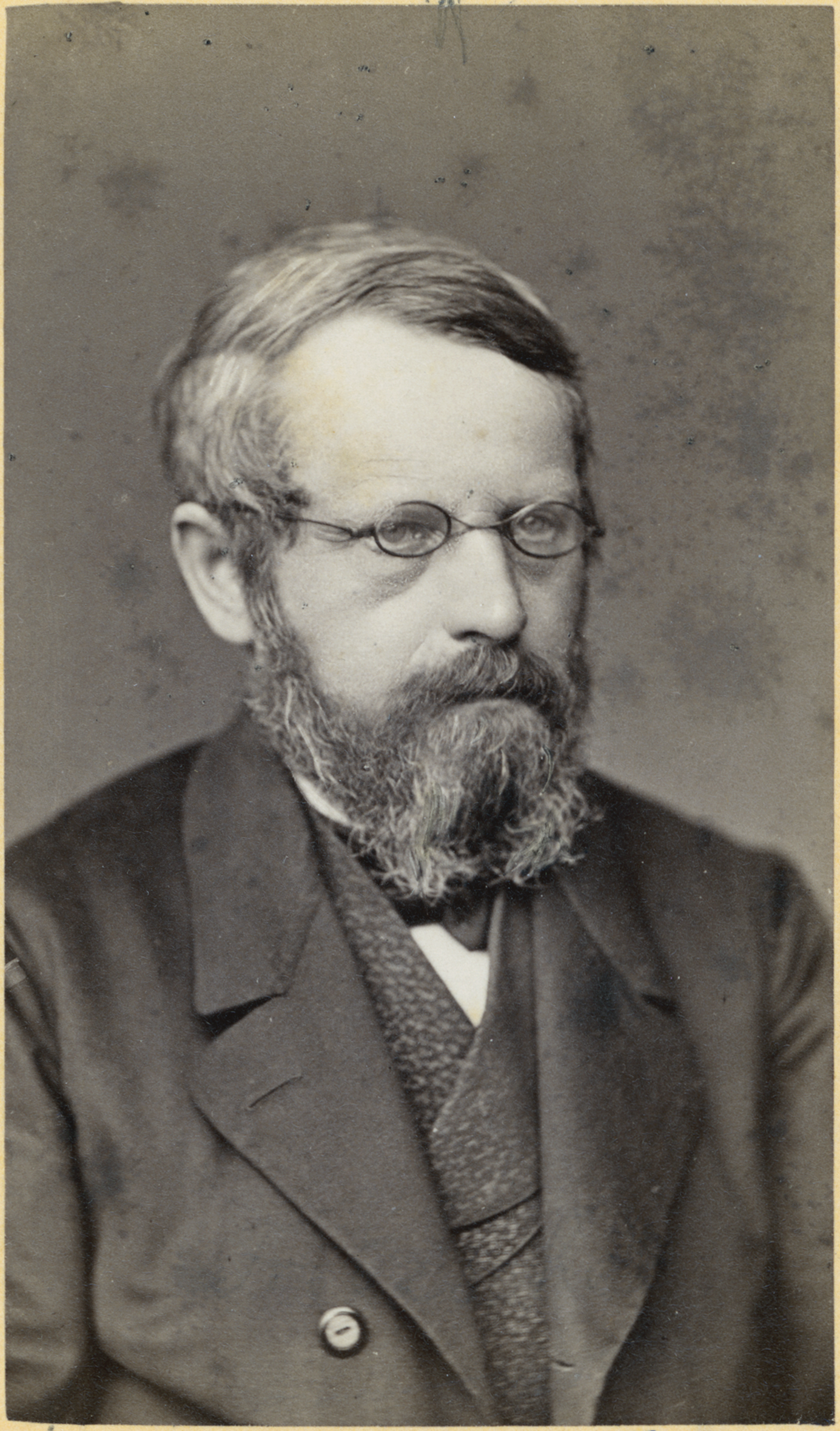
Otto Fridolinus Fritzsche

Otto Fridolinus Fritzsche also Otto Fridolin Fritzsche (September 23, 1812 in Dobrilugk – March 9, 1896 in Zurich) was a German Protestant theologian. His father, Christian Friedrich Fritzsche (1776–1850), was also a minister and theologian, .

He studied at the University of Halle, where in 1836 he obtained his habilitation. In 1837 he became an associate professor of theology at the University of Zurich. In 1842 he became a titular professor, followed by a full professorship in 1860. At the same time, he held from 1844 until his death, the post of chief librarian at the cantonal library.

== Published works ==
His writings were mainly in the fields of biblical exegesis and church history. His major works include his Apocrypha of the Old Testament (1871).

- De Theodori Mopsvesteni vita et scriptis commentatio historica theologica, 1836 – Work associated with Theodore of Mopsuestia.
- Das dritte Buch Esra : die Zusätze zum Buch Esther und Daniel, das Gebet des Manasse, das Buch Baruch und der Brief des Jeremia, 1851 – The third book of Ezra; the additions to the Book of Esther and Daniel, the Prayer of Manasseh, the Book of Baruch and the Letter of Jeremiah.
- Kurzgefasstes exegetisches Handbuch zu den Apokryphen des Alten Testamentes, 6 parts, 1851–1860, (with Carl Ludwig Wilibald Grimm) – Succinct exegetical manual to the Apocrypha of the Old Testament.
- Libri apocryphi Veteris Testamenti graece, 1871.
- Glarean : sein Leben und seine Schriften, 1890 – Glarean, his life and his writings.
- Anselmi Cantuariensis Archiepiscopi Libri duo Cur Deus Homo, 1893; Two books of Anselm, Archbishop of Canterbury, Why God became man.
