= Fritz Harnest =

German painter

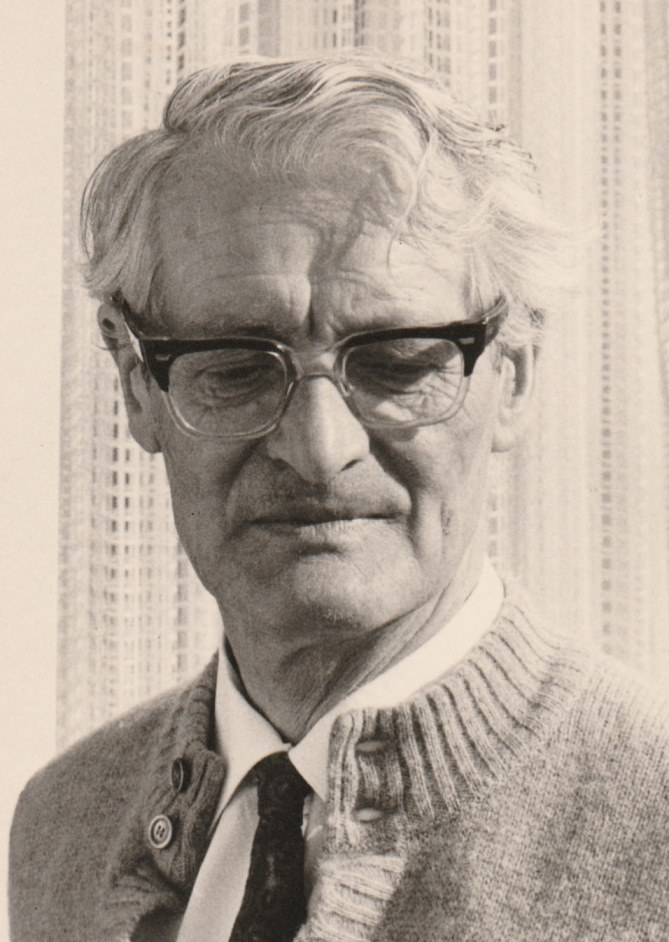
- Photo: Joseph Harnest, 1970
- Born: 16 August 1905; Munich, Germany
- Died: 28 January 1999 (aged 93); Traunstein, Germany
- Known for: Painting, Woodcut

Fritz Harnest (1905–1999) was a German painter, printmaker and collage artist. He was a creator of abstract modern art in Germany after World War II.

== Biography ==
Harnest studied at the Academy of Fine Arts, Munich from 1921 to 1929. He travelled frequently to France in 1930–1931 with the German painter Otto Baumann. He ceased painting after the Nazi seizure of power but later resumed his career, creating woodcuts and murals. From 1940 to 1945 he worked as an interpreter in Stalag VII-A in Moosburg. In 1959 he was a participant of II. documenta in Kassel.

== Art in public space ==
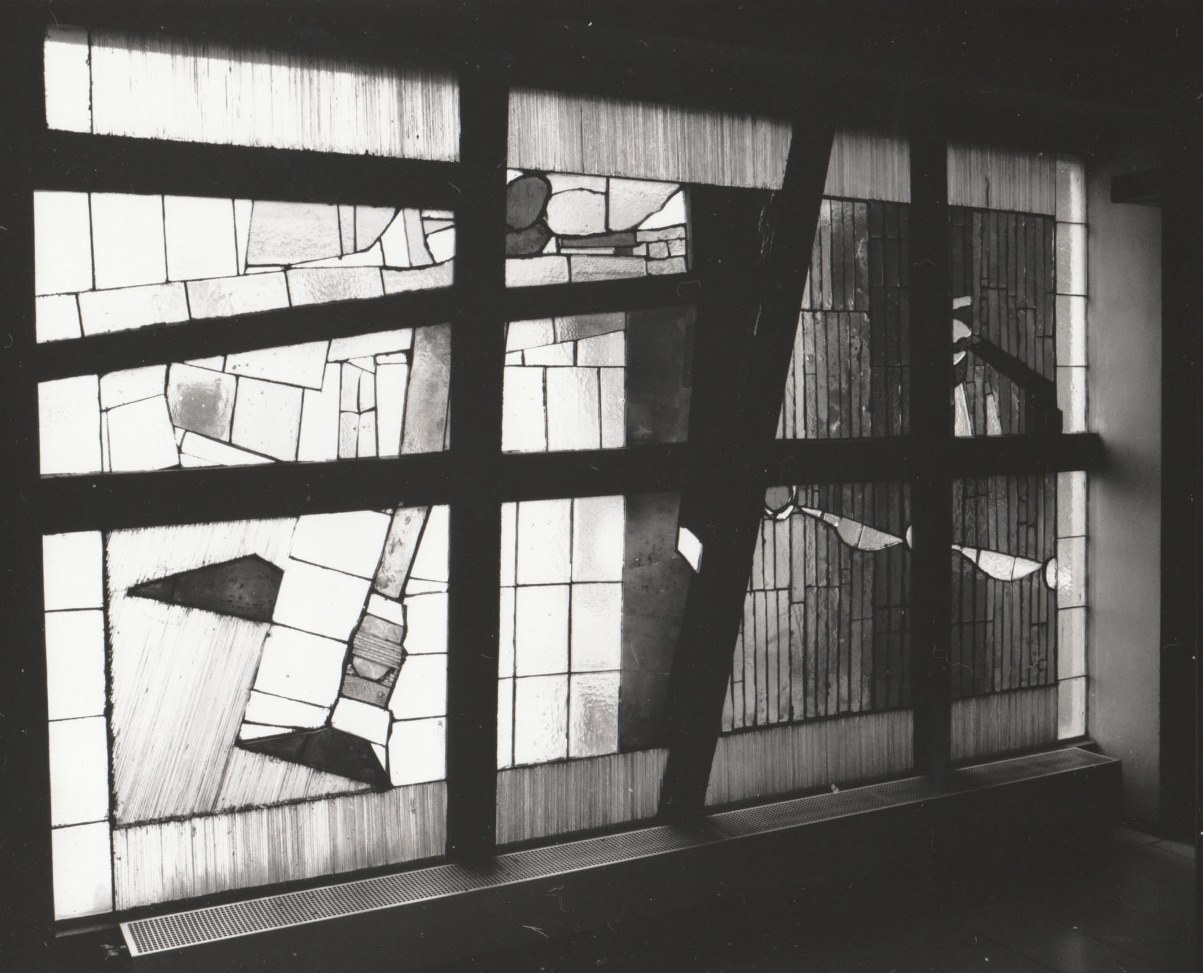
Colored window in the stairwell of the Technical University of Munich.

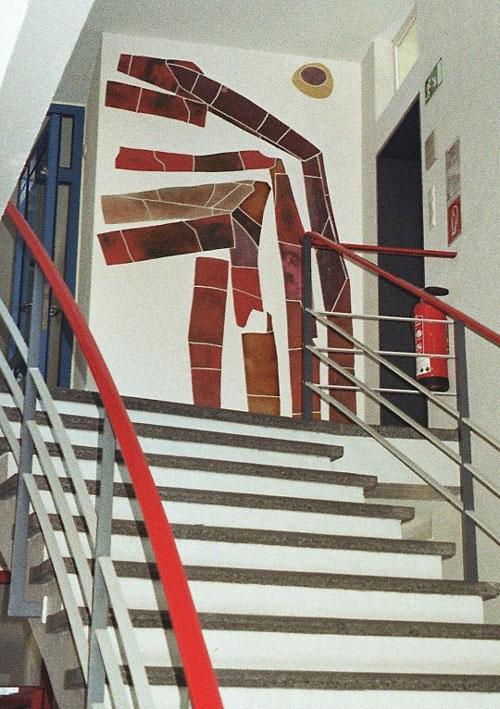
Ceramics on the walls of a stairwell in the tax office at Säckingen (with Richard Bampi).

== Honours ==
- 1961: 2nd prize at the „II. Internationalen Triennale Grenchen“ for colored original graphics, Switzerland
- 1969: medal of honor at the “Triennale Internazionale della Xilographia Contemporanea Capri”, Italy
- 1996: Bundesverdienstkreuz der Bundesrepublik Deutschland
