= Franz Fedier =

Swiss painter (1922–2005)

- Born: 17 February 1922; Erstfeld, Switzerland
- Died: 11 May 2005 (aged 83); Bern, Switzerland
- Known for: Painting
- Movement: Informel, abstract art

Franz Fedier (17 February 1922 – 11 May 2005) was a Swiss painter associated with abstract art and Informel. After early figurative work, he moved toward abstraction in the 1950s and was one of the Swiss representatives at documenta II in Kassel in 1959. He later headed the painting class at the Schule für Gestaltung in Basel and served as president of the Swiss Federal Art Commission.

== Biography ==
Franz Fedier was born on 17 February 1922 in Erstfeld, Switzerland. He trained as a painter-decorator in Brugg from 1939 to 1941, before studying at the Kunstgewerbeschule Luzern under Max von Moos. He was also a pupil of Heinrich Danioth and assisted him with mural projects.

In 1945, Fedier moved to Bern, where he worked as a graphic artist in an advertising office. After 1945, he travelled in Italy, Spain, Portugal and the Netherlands, and spent extended periods in Algeria. He later studied in Paris, attending the Académie de la Grande Chaumière, Atelier 17 and the Académie Fernand Léger. From 1952, he worked as an independent artist in Bern.

Fedier headed the painting class at the Schule für Gestaltung in Basel from 1966 to 1987. He became a member of the Swiss Federal Art Commission in 1985 and served as its president from 1987 to 1992. He died in Bern on 11 May 2005.

== Work ==
Franz Fedier became associated with abstract painting after the Second World War. After early figurative work, his paintings moved toward abstraction in the 1950s. His early abstract works were linked to Informel. In 1959, he was invited as one of the Swiss representatives to documenta II in Kassel. Works from this period included series such as Spuren and Fliessende Farben.

After 1966, while teaching at the Kunstgewerbeschule Basel, he moved away from Informel and explored abstraction through Hard-edge painting and Minimal Art. In the 1970s, his work became more geometric, with grids, stripe compositions and clearly defined colour forms. In his later work, he combined elements from earlier phases, using bars, triangles and square frames to build pictorial structures.

Although Fedier worked in abstraction, his paintings remained connected to everyday reality, including nature, technology, buildings and people. He also conceived unrealised public-art projects, including a 1970 proposal for geometric colour patterns on the Susten Pass, as well as proposals for the Gotthard motorway and the Teufelsstein near Göschenen.
