= Guido Jendritzko =

German sculptor, painter

Guido Jendritzko (31 January 1925 – 1 October 2009) was a German sculptor, painter, graphic artist and photographer. He was an important and versatile representative of Abstract art after the Second World War.

== Life ==
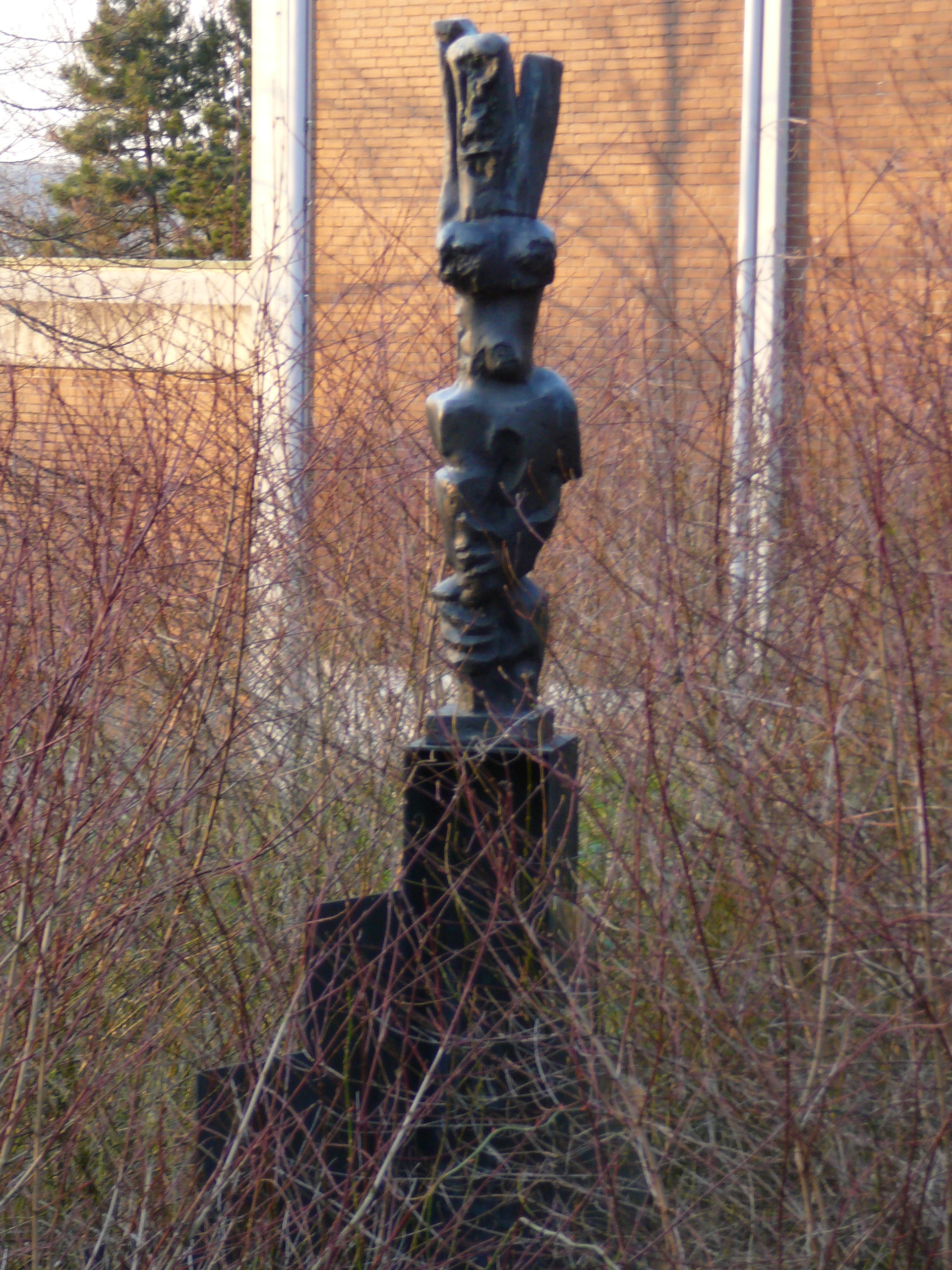
Siegespose, 1988 by Guido Jendritzko

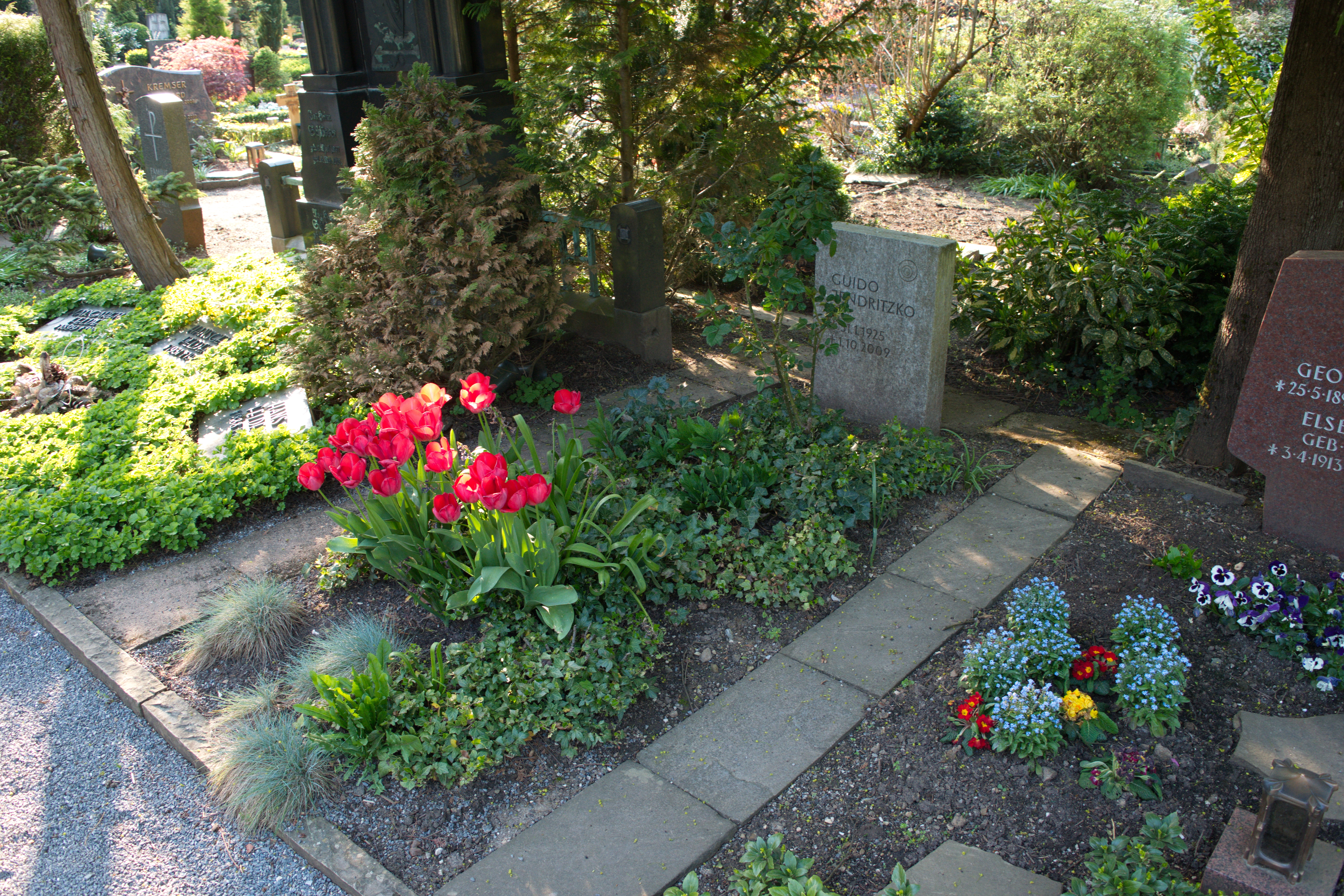
Jendritzko's gravesite

Born in Doberlug-Kirchhain, Jendritzko studied at the Universität der Künste Berlin from 1950 to 1956 as Meisterschüler of Karl Hartung. In 1957, he was a scholarship holder of the Kulturkreis der deutschen Wirtschaft. In the same year, he received the Deutscher Kritikerpreis from the Verband der deutschen Kritiker e. V. in the "Bildende Kunst" category. In 1959, Jendritzko was a participant in the II. documenta in Kassel in the "Abteilung Plastik" department. In 1960, he was awarded the Villa Romana Prize. Jendritzko was a lecturer at the former Werkkunstschule Wuppertal from 1964 and professor of free sculpture until 1990 at the Bergische Universität Wuppertal.

Always committed to cultural policy, Jendritzko, for example, constructively participated in the Wuppertal debate on the question of the new building of the Von der Heydt Museum in the early 1970s. On behalf of the specially constituted "Working Group for the New Museum", a citizens' initiative, and in alliance with the happening artist and lecturer at the Hochschule für bildende Künste Hamburg, Bazon Brock and the poet and lecturer Gerd Hergen Lübben, responsible for literature and art at the Wuppertal Adult Education Centre, Jendritzko demanded that the meetings of an originally planned "non-public hearing" with selected "museum experts" be made public. Jendritzko's demand had the success that the public was then admitted though but not the simultaneously requested participation of the citizens' initiative in partnership. – The paper "NEUES MUSEUM. Ein Konzept" by Jendritzko together with the lecturers Gerd Hergen Lübben and Edgar Bach caused quite a stir in the media and was included in the public debate. À propos "Ein Konzept", the Neue Ruhr Zeitung (NRZ) noted: "The authors assume that art will no longer float in the aesthetic free space of society. The new museum is to work towards the expansion of knowledge, consciousness and activity of its visitors"; and the "distribution plan" of the new museum concept drawn by Jendritzko led to the NRZ exclamation: "As if it were a new poem! It looks like avant-garde poetry."

Jendritzko died at the age of 84, five days after he was knocked down by unknown supporters of the Borussia Dortmund club at Wuppertal Hauptbahnhof on 26 September 2009. However, the autopsy revealed that he had apparently not died directly from the consequences of the injuries sustained in the fall, but from pneumonia.

Jendritzko was a member of the Deutscher Künstlerbund.
