= Franz Volkmar Fritzsche =

German classical philologist (1806–1887)

- Born: January 26, 1806; Steinbach bei Borna
- Died: March 17, 1887 (aged 81)
- Known for: Scholarly interpretation of Aristophanes and Lucian

Academic background
- Education: University of Leipzig

Academic work
- Discipline: Classical philology

Franz Volkmar Fritzsche (26 January 1806 in Steinbach bei Borna – 17 March 1887) was a German classical philologist. He was the son of theologian Christian Friedrich Fritzsche (1776–1850).

He studied under philologist Gottfried Hermann (his future father-in-law) at the University of Leipzig, where in 1825 he received his habilitation. In 1828, he succeeded Immanuel Gottlieb Huschke (1761–1828) as professor of rhetoric and belles-lettres (teaching classes in classical literature) at the University of Rostock. At Rostock, he founded a philological seminar, and in 1836/37, he served as university rector.

== Writings ==
In the field of classical literature, he is largely known for his scholarly interpretation of Aristophanes and Lucian. The following are some of his principal writings:

- Quaestiones Lucianeae, 1826
- Varietas lectionis in Luciani Nigrinum, 1830
- Quaestiones Aristophaneae, 1835
- De parabasi Thesmophoriazusarum commentatio, 1836
- Aristophanis comoediae, quae supersunt, 1838
- Disputatio de Adimanto, patriae suae proditore, 1843
- Disputatio de Deo ex machina, 1843
- Aristophanis Ranae, 1845.
