= Walter Linck =

Swiss sculptor (1903–1975)

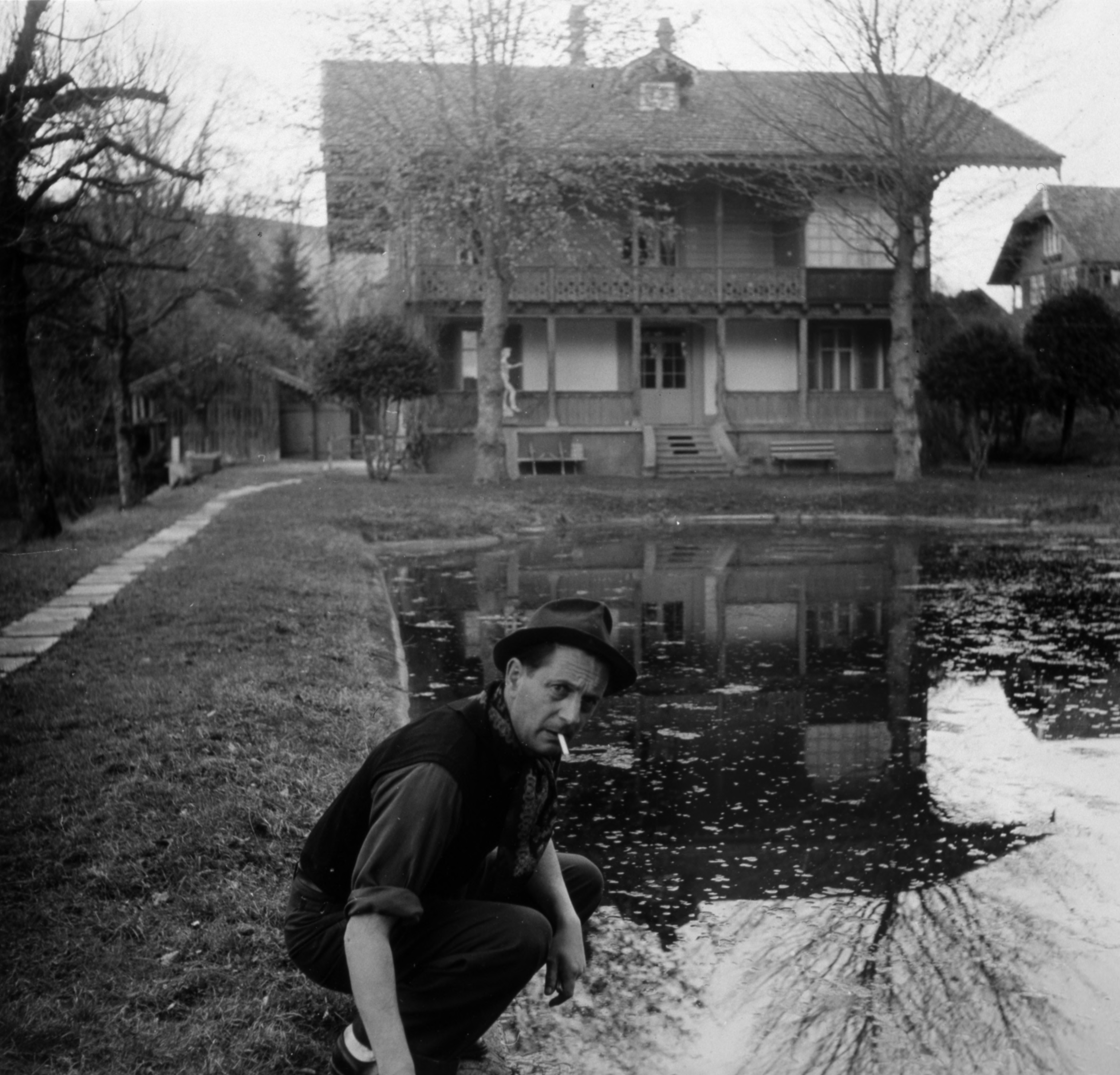
- Linck in 1949, photographed by Emmy Andriesse
- Born: 3 February 1903; Bern, Switzerland
- Died: 3 January 1975 (aged 71); Reichenbach, Zollikofen, Switzerland
- Education: Gewerbeschule Bern; Kunstgewerbeschule Zürich; Academy of Fine Arts, Berlin
- Occupation: Sculptor
- Known for: Figurative sculpture, iron sculpture, wire and spring-steel constructions
- Spouse: Margrit Daepp

Walter Linck (3 February 1903 – 3 January 1975) was a Swiss sculptor known for figurative sculpture and later kinetic works in metal. His bronze sculpture Don Quichotte was entered in the sculpture event at the 1948 Summer Olympics, and he later exhibited internationally, including at the Venice Biennale, documenta II and the São Paulo Biennale.

== Biography ==
Walter Linck was born in Bern on 3 February 1903. He trained at the Gewerbeschule in Bern and at the Kunstgewerbeschule Zürich, where he studied metalwork. From 1922 to 1926, he studied sculpture at the Academy of Fine Arts in Berlin under Wilhelm Gerstel.

After returning to Switzerland in 1926, Linck shared a studio in Zurich with the ceramicist Margrit Daepp, whom he married in 1927. The couple moved to Paris in 1928, and Linck later worked between Paris and Bern before returning permanently to Switzerland in 1940. He moved into a house with a studio in Reichenbach near Bern in 1941.

In 1943, Linck destroyed almost all of his earlier sculptural work by sinking it in the Aare, and then turned to metal as his principal material. He held a teaching appointment at the Werkakademie Kassel from 1956 to 1957. Linck died in Reichenbach, in the municipality of Zollikofen, on 3 January 1975.

== Work ==
Linck worked in sculpture, iron sculpture, steel sculpture, kinetic art and public art. Until 1950, his work was mainly figurative. In 1950, he began using wire and sheet iron, and from 1952 he made abstract movable sculptures using wire and spring steel.

His mobile wire works were sensitive to vibration and moving air. Works such as Grasharfe (1952–1953), Piano rythmique (1954) and Les deux principes (1952–1953) reflected his interest in rhythm and balance. In the 1960s and 1970s, he applied this sculptural language to larger steel works for public settings, including Action (1970) and Orbite (1970–1972).

Linck’s bronze sculpture Don Quichotte was entered in the sculpture event at the 1948 Summer Olympics in London.

Linck held his first solo exhibition at Galerie Marbach in Bern in 1953 and participated in the 1st Swiss Sculpture Exhibition in Biel in 1954. He took part in the 28th Venice Biennale in 1956 and documenta II in Kassel in 1959. In 1963, he represented Switzerland at the 7th São Paulo Biennale, and in 1966 he participated in the 33rd Venice Biennale.
