= Louis Van Lint =

Belgian painter (1909–1986)

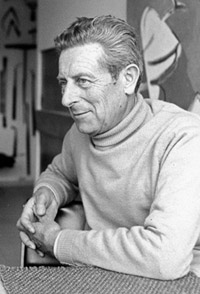
- Louis Van Lint in 1984
- Born: Louis Noël Van Lint; 26 December 1909; Brussels, Belgium
- Died: 27 December 1986 (aged 77); Brussels, Belgium
- Education: Académie des beaux-arts de Saint-Josse-ten-Noode
- Known for: Painting

Louis Van Lint (December 26, 1909 – December 27, 1986) was a Belgian painter, major figure of the Belgian post-war abstraction.

== Biography ==
Louis Van Lint studied painting at the Academy of Saint-Josse-ten-Noode (Brussels) under Henry Ottevaere and Jacques Maes until 1939. He studied sculpture and architecture as well.

His early work reflects a traditional figurative painting style with a unique sense of color. In 1940 he founded the group "La Route Libre" with Gaston Bertrand and Anne Bonnet. His art was influenced to some degree by the animist movement, but he eventually broke away with the presentation of his painting, The Flayed Body (L'Ecorche, 1943), a shocking expression of his wish for more artistic freedom that consequently sounded a revolt against animism.

As his style matured, he switched to abstraction in which he excelled as colorist and master of form.

After World War II he co-founded The Young Belgian Painters (La Jeune Peinture Belge) with Gaston Bertrand, Anne Bonnet and some others.

Van Lint experimented with geometric abstraction for a decade, and then, influenced by the French painter Bazaine, he started his lyrical abstraction period. He participated in the demonstrations and exhibitions of the CoBrA group. In 1958, The Solomon R. Guggenheim Foundation gave him a prize and in 1960 he became a member of the Royal Academy of Belgium. In the 1960s, he introduced Hergé to abstract painting and provided him with private lessons for one year.

He has long been represented in Belgian section in outstanding exhibitions of contemporary painting and his work is held by several museums all over the world such as the Royal Museums of Fine Arts of Belgium, the Uffizi Gallery of Florence, the Guggenheim and the Brooklyn museums in New York, the Carnegie Museum of Art in Pittsburgh, and the São Paulo Contemporary Art Museum in Brazil.

== Van Lint collector ==
Van Lint collected antique tools, chosen for their harmonious shapes. Part of the collection decorated a wall of his living room and aroused the curiosity and interest of many famous guests.

== Exhibitions ==
- Venice Biennale, 1948.
- International Watercolor Exhibition, Fourteenth Biennial, Brooklyn Museum, New York, 1948.
- São Paulo Biennale, 1951-1953.
- Carnegie Institute, Pittsburgh, 1952.
- 7 Belgian artists, Tokyo, 1952.
- 7 Belgian artists, Duk-Soo Palace, Seoul, 1952.
- 2nd Sâo Paulo Biennial, Museu de Arte Moderna, Sâo Paulo, 1953.
- Guggenheim Museum, New York, 1954.
- L’image de Lille, Palais de Chaillot, Paris, 1958.
- Carnegie Institute, Pittsburgh, 1958.
- A few Belgian artists since Ensor, New York, 1958.
- Documenta 2, Documenta, Cassel, 1959.
- 5th Sâo Paulo Biennial, Museu de Arte Moderna, Sâo Paulo, 1959.
- The Arts of Belgium 1920-1960, Parke-Bernet Galleries, New York, 1960.
- Twenty Contemporary Painters from Phlippe Dotremont Collection Brussels, Guggenheim Museum, New York, 1959.
- Tokyo Biennale, 1961.
- First Midwestern Exhibition of Belgian Painters, The Arts Club & The Art Gallery of University Notre-Dame, Chicago, 1961.
- First Midwestern Exhibition of Belgian Painters, The Contemporary Arts Center, Cincinnati, 1962.
- First Midwestern Exhibition of Belgian Painters, The University Gallery of Minnesota, 1962.
- Belgian drawings from Ensor to Delvaux, Smithsonian Institution, Washington, 1962.
- Joven Pintura Belga, Sala de expociones de la direccion general de Bellas Artes, Madrid, 1962.
- Tokyo Biennale, 1965.
- International Exhibition, Carnegie Institute, Pittsburg, 1967.
- Belgian Art 1945-1970, Museo de Arte Moderno, Mexico, 1970.
- Cobra Hasta 12 Años Despues: En La Coleccion Karel Van Stuijenberg, Museo de arte contemporáneo, Santiago, et Museo de Arte Moderno, Buenos Aires, 1994.
- The Flemish and Ostend painting, Venice, 1997.
- From Cobra to abstraction. The Thomas Neirynck Collection, Paris, 2006.
- Cobra Passages – The Neyrinck collection, BAM, Mons, 2008.
- BRAFA, 25th anniversary of the King Baudouin Foundation, Brussels, 2012
- Kandinsky & Russia, Royal Museums of Fine Arts of Belgium, Brussels, 2013
- Around Louis Van Lint, Pierre Hallet Gallery, Brussels, 2013
- Belgian geometrical abstractions. From 1945 to the present days, BAM, Mons, 2014.
- The Belgian self-portraits of the Uffizi Uffizi Gallery, Florence, 2014.

== Bibliography ==
Monographs

- Léon-Louis Sosset, Louis Van Lint, Sikkel, Antwerps, 1951
- Philippe Roberts-Jones, Van Lint, the French Community Ministry, Brussels, 1983
- Serge Goyens de Heusch, Louis Van Lint, Ghent, 2002

Selected books

- George Stewart, These Men, My Friends, Caldwell, Idaho : Caxton Printers, 1954, 400 p.
- Guggenheim international award, Solomon R. Guggenheim Foundation, 1958, 30 p.
- Gordon Bailey Washburn, The 1958 Pittsburgh International Exhibition of Contemporary Painting and Sculpture, Department of Fine Arts, Carnegie Institute Press, Pittsburgh, 1958
- Gaston Diehl, The moderns: a treasury of painting throughout the world, Crown Publishers, 1961, 219 p. ISBN 978-5-551-82011-6
- Marcel Brion, Art since 1945, Washington Square Press, New York, 1962, 336 p.
- Will Grohmann, Sam Hunter, New art around the world: painting and sculpture, H. N. Abrams, New York, 1966, 509 p.
- Michel Seuphor, Abstract painting: 50 years of accomplishment, from Kandinsky to the present, Abrams, New York, 1967, 192 p.
- Phaidon encyclopedia of art and artists, Phaidon, 1978, 764 p. ISBN 978-0-7148-1513-8
- Harold Osborne, The Oxford companion to twentieth-century art, Oxford University Press, 1981, 656 p. ISBN 978-0-19-866119-1
- Jean Clarence Lambert, Cobra, Abbeville Press, New York, 1984, 261 p. ISBN 978-0-89659-416-6
- W. Patrick Atkinson, Theatrical Design in the Twentieth Century: An Index to Photographic Reproductions of Scenic Designs, Greenwood Press, London, 1996, 488 p. ISBN 978-0-313-29701-4
- Jan Hoet, S.M.A.K. : Museum of Contemporary Art, Ludion, Ghent, 1999, 269 p. ISBN 978-90-5544-247-8
- Museum of modern art: a selection of works, Royal Museums of Belgium, Brussels 2001, 269 p.
- Sara Pendergast, Tom Pendergast, Contemporary Artists: A-K, St. James Press, 2002
- Peter Shield, Graham Birtwistle, Cobra: Copenhagen, Brussels, Amsterdam, Hayward Gallery, London, 2003, 107 p. ISBN 978-1-85332-231-0
- Paul F. State, Historical dictionary of Brussels, Scarecrow Press, USA, 2004. ISBN 0-8108-5075-3
- Nathalie Aubert, Pierre-Philippe Fraiture, Patrick McGuinness, From Art Nouveau to Surrealism: Belgian modernity in the making, London, 2007. ISBN 9781904350644
- Michael Farr, The Adventures of Herge, creator of Tintin, Last Gasp, San Francisco, 2007, 127 p. ISBN 978-0-7195-6799-5
- Leen de Jong, Siska Beele, The Royal Museum of Fine Arts, Antwerp: a history, 1810-2007, Stichting Kunstboek, 2008, 255 p. ISBN 978-90-5856-272-2
- Pierre Assouline, Charles Ruas, Hergé: The Man Who Created Tintin, Oxford University Press, USA, 2009, 288 p. ISBN 978-0-19-539759-8
- Gli autoritratti belgi degli Uffizi, Uffizi Gallery, Giunti, Florence, 127 p. ISBN 978-88-09-79619-5
