= Dobrilugk Abbey =

Coordinates: 51°36′40″N 13°32′43″E

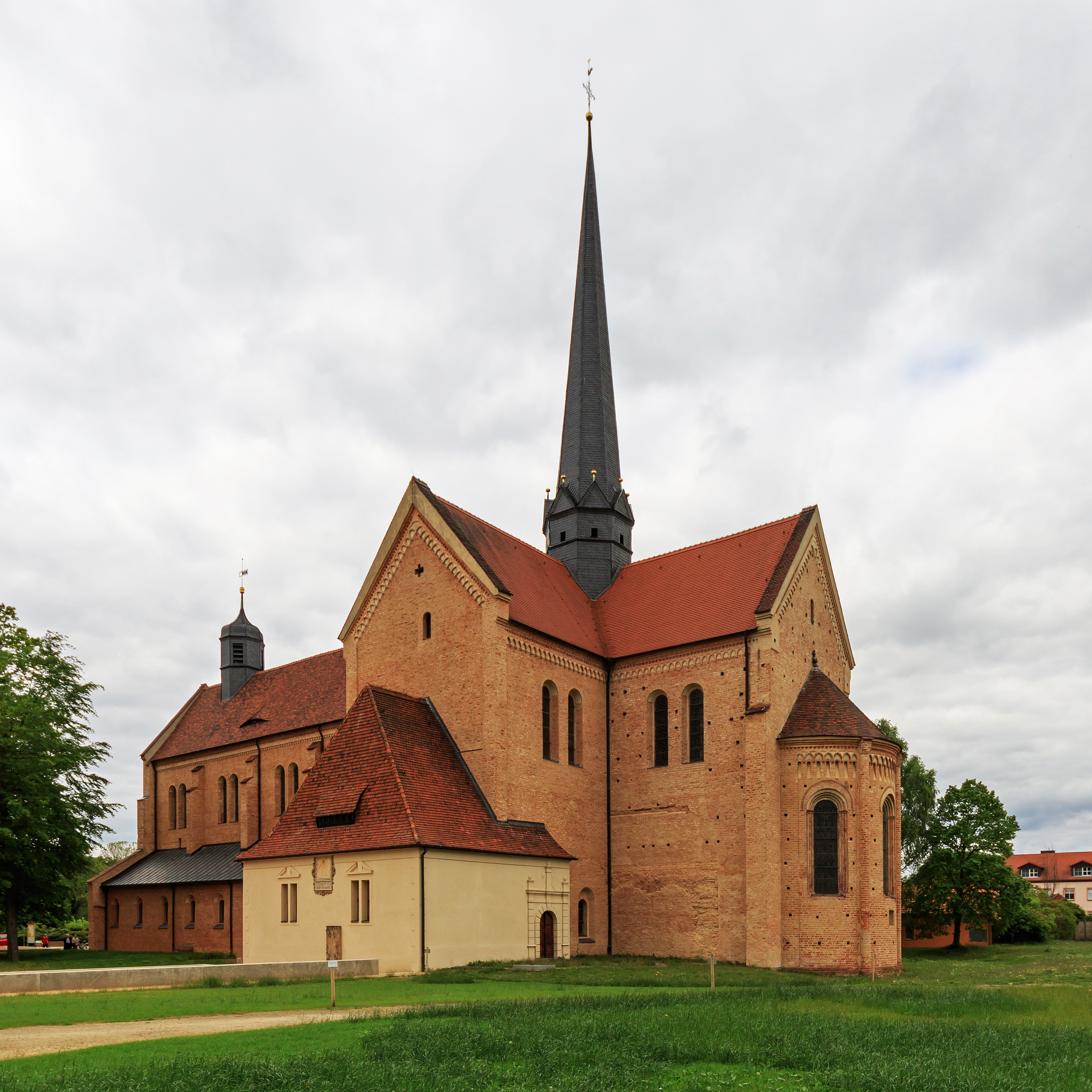
Church of Dobrilugk Abbey

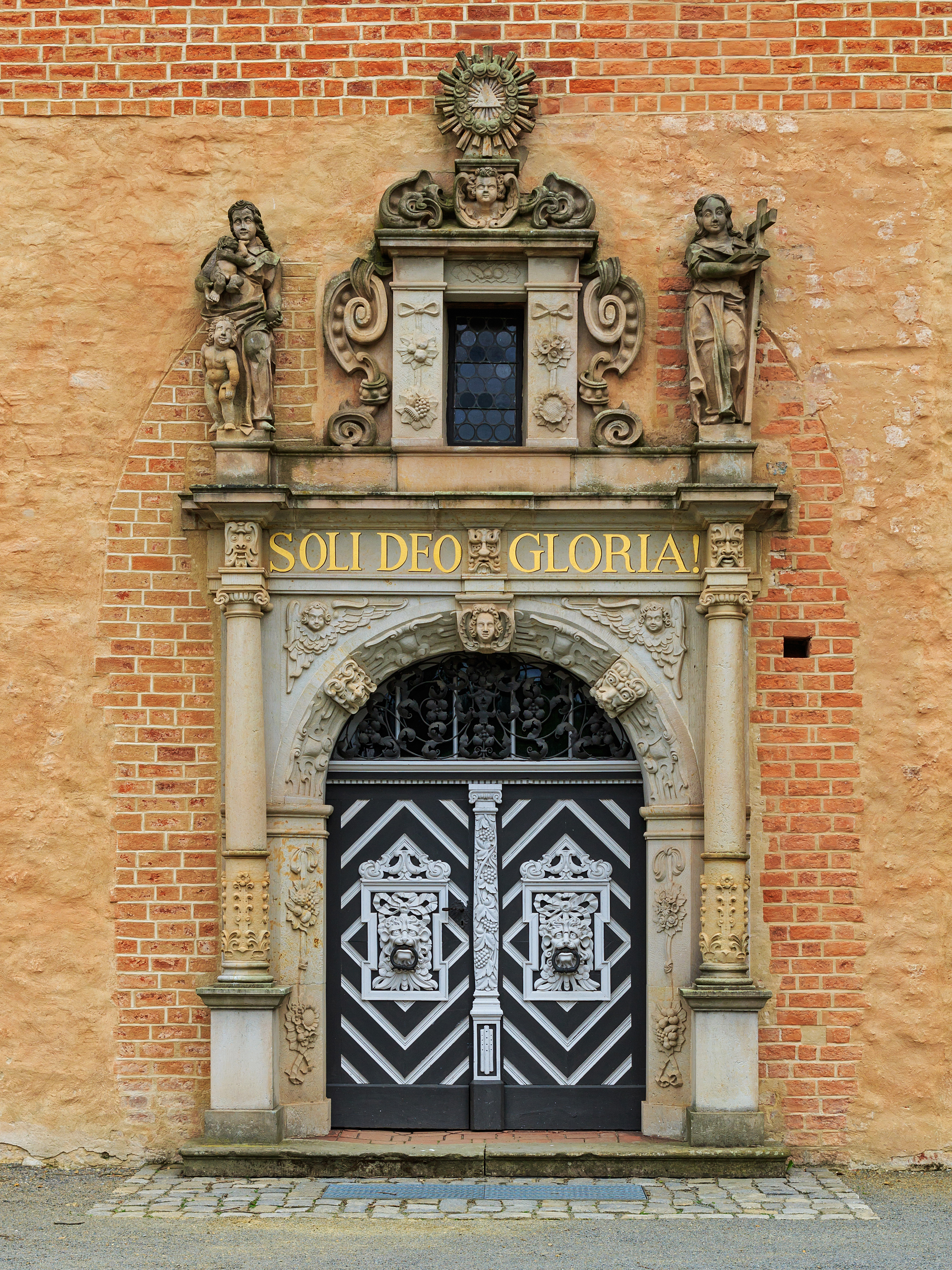
Gate of the church

Dobrilugk Abbey (Kloster Dobrilugk) was a Cistercian monastery in Lower Lusatia in the territory of the present town of Doberlug-Kirchhain, Brandenburg, Germany.

== History ==
The abbey was legally founded on 1 May 1165 by charter of Margrave Dietrich of Landsberg und Eilenburg and of the Ostmark of Lusatia, but because of continuing hostilities in the area the community did not make any real progress until 1184, when twelve monks from Volkenroda Abbey began the settlement in earnest. By 1209 building was far enough advanced for it to be possible to bury the Margravine Elisabeth, wife of the Margrave Konrad II, in the abbey church.

Generous endowments enabled the monastery to grow very rapidly thereafter, however. In 1234 it already owned 18 villages and from 1240 it was sufficiently powerful economically to increase its land-holdings by its own purchases, rather than depending on donors. In a deed of 1370 Emperor Charles IV confirmed the monks in possession of 40 villages and five farmyards. The abbey was also the lord of the little town of Kirchhain, to which they had granted the right to hold a market in 1235. In addition, the abbey had premises in the more important towns of Luckau, seat of the territorial prince, and in Lübben (which between about 1301 and 1329 belonged to the abbey), in order to deal more efficiently with the sale of agricultural produce. Like all Cistercian abbeys, Dobrilugk was exempt from episcopal tithes.

The abbey was deeply involved in medieval land development in the west of Lower Lusatia. The monks recruited German settlers who established several villages on abbey lands; most of the serfs however were Sorbs. The abbot of Dobrilugk had a seat and a vote in the Prelates' Curia of the Lower Lusatian Landtag.

At the end of the 14th century began the slow decline of the abbey. The monks no longer undertook cultivation themselves, but relied on the income from rents and taxes. There were simply no longer enough men available to enter the abbey as lay brothers (conversi) to carry out the physical tasks.

In 1431 Dobrilugk was plundered by the Hussites.

Nevertheless, economically the abbey continued to prosper. In a document of 1434 the abbey is shown as the owner of no less than 65 villages.

The end came with the Reformation. Since the 1520s monks had been leaving and turning to the new teachings. Monastic discipline and also the economics of the abbey fell into disorder. In 1533 the abbot absconded with the abbey's portable valuables. In addition, Emperor Ferdinand I demanded high contributions from the Lower Lusatian abbeys to finance the Turkish wars. Finally, in 1541, Johann Friedrich I, Elector of Saxony, occupied Dobrilugk, because of a financial claim he had against the King of Bohemia, in whose territory it was. The monks abandoned the monastery and the community was dissolved.

Although the Roman Catholic Ferdinand I was able to win back the abbey lordship in the Schmalkaldic War and reincorporate it into Lower Lusatia, he too kept the monks from returning, and instead mortgaged the extensive territory to several members in turn of the noble families of Schlick and Gersdorff. Heinrich von Gersdorff in about 1550 had a hunting lodge built to replace the abbot's house. The last owner of the nobility, Heinrich Anselm von Promnitz, sold Dobrilugk in 1624 to Johann Georg of Saxony, who shortly before had become the mortgagee of the whole of Lower Lusatia. The Lower Lusatian parliament had however been able to bring it about that the abbatial territory remained part of the margravate. So the curious situation arose that the lordship of Dobrilugk belonged administratively both to Lower Lusatia and Kursachsen. Subjects paid their taxes into the Lower Lusatia exchequer, but answered to the justice of the officials of the Saxon Elector, appeal from which could only be made to the Chamber Court in Dresden and no longer to the Lower Lusatia State Court.

Under the Wettin collateral line of Sachsen-Merseburg (1656–1738) Dobrilugk was a secondary residence of the dukes and the region enjoyed a new period of prosperity.

== Bibliography ==
- Arnt Cobbers: Zisterzienserkloster Doberlug (= Der historische Ort, 68). Berlin 1998.
- Felix Engel: Die Reformation in Dobrilugk und Kirchhain, in: Brandenburgisches Genealogisches Jahrbuch 8 (2014), pp. 6–25.
- Stefanie Fink: Die Klosterkirche zu Doberlug. Görlitz/Zittau 2014 ISBN 9783944560083
- Andreas Hanslok: Die Anfänge des Gesundheitswesens in Kirchhain, im Kloster und der Stadt Dobrilugk, in: Der Speicher, Heft 2 (1998): pp. 13–17.
- Andreas Hanslok: Die Teiche des Klosters Dobrilugk – eine Bestandsaufnahme, in: Der Speicher, Heft 12 (2009): pp. 19–26.
- Andreas Hanslok: Die Visitation – eine Kommunikationsform innerhalb des Zisterzienserordens – Das Kloster Dobrilugk als Beispiel, in: Der Speicher, Heft 13 (2010): pp. 77–84.
- Andreas Hanslok: Die Fußbodenfliesen des Zisterzienserklosters Doberlug, in: Brandenburgische Denkmalpflege, Heft 1 (2011): pp. 95–104.
- Rudolf Lehmann: Die älteste Geschichte des Klosters Dobrilugk in der Lausitz. Kirchhain 1917.
- Rudolf Lehmann: Die Besetzung des Klosters Dobrilugk durch Kurfürst Johan Friedrich im August 1541 und ihre Folgen, in: Ders.: Aus der Vergangenheit der Niederlausitz. Vorträge und Aufsätze. Cottbus 1925, pp. 93–113.
- Rudolf Lehmann (ed.): Urkundenbuch des Klosters Dobrilugk und seiner Besitzungen (= Urkundenbuch zur Geschichte des Markgraftums Niederlausitz, 5). Leipzig 1941.
- Michael Lindner: Aachen – Dobrilugk – Płock. Markgraf Dietrich von der Ostmark/Lausitz, Bischof Werner von Płock und die Anfänge des Klosters Dobrilugk, in: Heinz-Dieter Heimann/Klaus Neitmann/Uwe Tresp (ed.): Die Nieder- und Oberlausitz. Konturen einer Integrationslandschaft, Bd. 1: Mittelalter. Berlin 2013, pp. 111–148.
- Dennis Majewski: Zisterziensische Rechtslandschaften. Die Klöster Dobrilugk und Haina in Raum und Zeit. Klostermann, Frankfurt am Main ISBN 9783465043300
- Gertraud Eva Schrage/Markus Agthe: Dobrilugk. Zisterzienser, in: Heinz-Dieter Heimann/Klaus Neitmann/Winfried Schich et al. (ed.): Brandenburgisches Klosterbuch. Handbuch der Klöster, Stifte und Kommenden bis zur Mitte des 16. Jahrhunderts (= Brandenburgische Historische Studien, 14), Bd. 1. Berlin 2007, pp. 425–442.
