= Anne Bonnet =

Belgian painter

- Born: Anne Thonet; 16 May 1908; Brussels, Belgium
- Died: 14 November 1960 (aged 52); Brussels, Belgium
- Known for: Painting

Anne Bonnet née Thonet (16 May 1908 – 14 November 1960) was a Belgian painter.

Bonnet was born in Brussels and began her studies in art in 1924, but abandoned them in 1926 on the death of her parents. In 1930, she married Louis Bonnet, a dealer in silk, and her financial situation allowed her to return to art. In 1936 she resumed art studies under Jacques Maes and held her first exhibition in 1938.

Originally influenced by realists such as James Ensor, she later adopted a geometric style of landscape painting, which became increasingly abstract, inviting comparisons with Paul Klee.

Her work was selected to be on show at the Documenta II exhibition in Kassel alongside other Belgian abstract artists like Henri Michaux, Michel Seuphor and Marc Mendelsohn. She was represented by three artworks: Vestiges (1956), Vestiges Grises (1956) and Hélianthes (1957).

Exhibitions of her work have been frequent since her death, including a major series in 1963 at the Royal Museums of Fine Arts of Belgium and at the Art museums of Liège and Charleroi.

Her iconic La ville d'or is held by the Royal Museums of Fine Arts of Belgium.
