= Max Kohler =

Swiss painter (1919–2001)

Max Ernst Kohler (6 October 1919, Solothurn – 1 April 2001, Zurich) was a Swiss painter.

Kohler's art received international attention, especially in the 1950s and 1960s. In 1959, Kohler was a participant in documenta 2 in Kassel in the graphic department. He lived and worked most of his life in Paris and Bern. In Aarau, he joined the Ziegelrain studio community, which had developed from the Aarau group around Heiner Kielholz, Christian Rothacher and Hugo Suter.
