= Doberlug-Kirchhain =

- Town
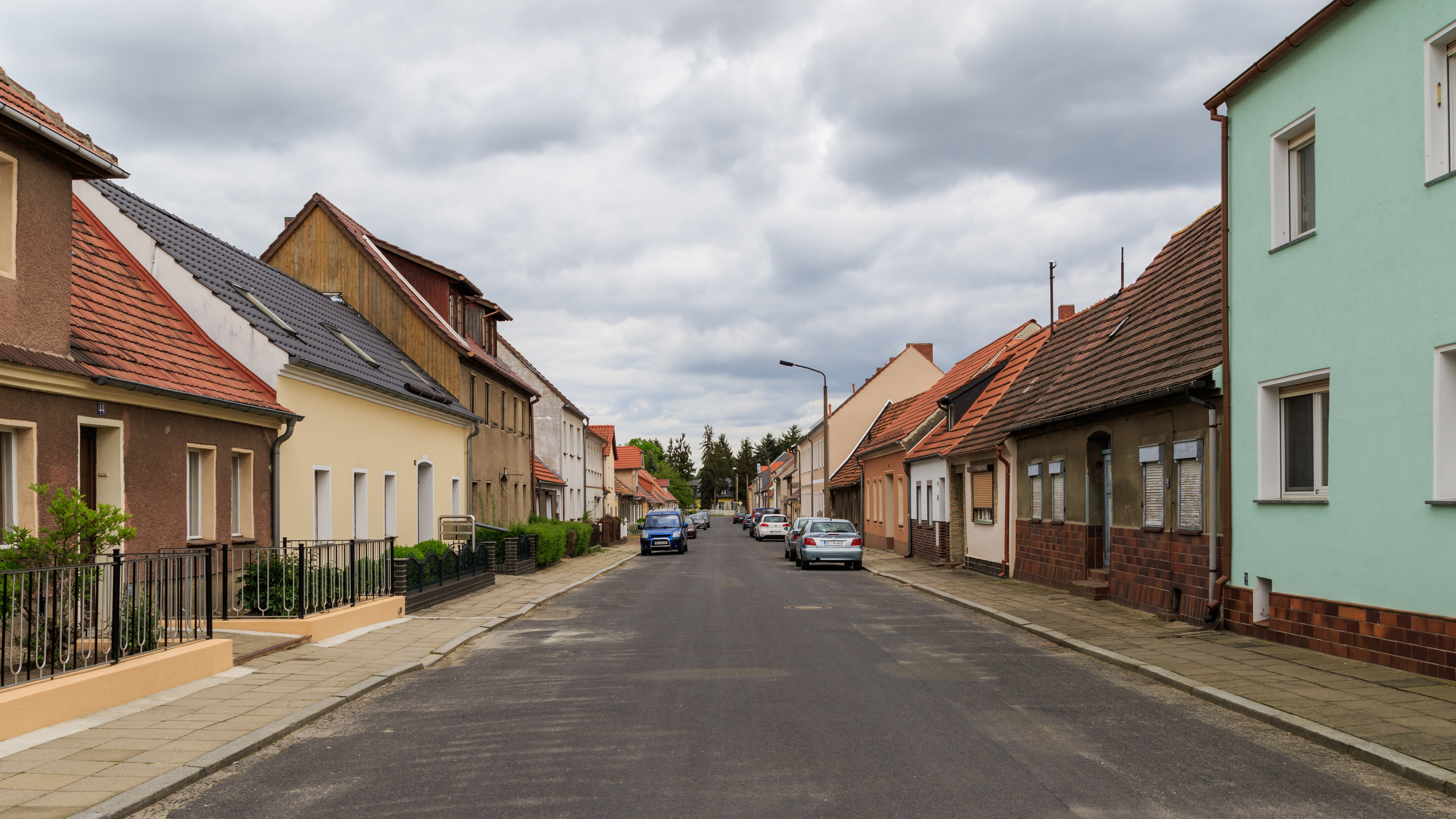

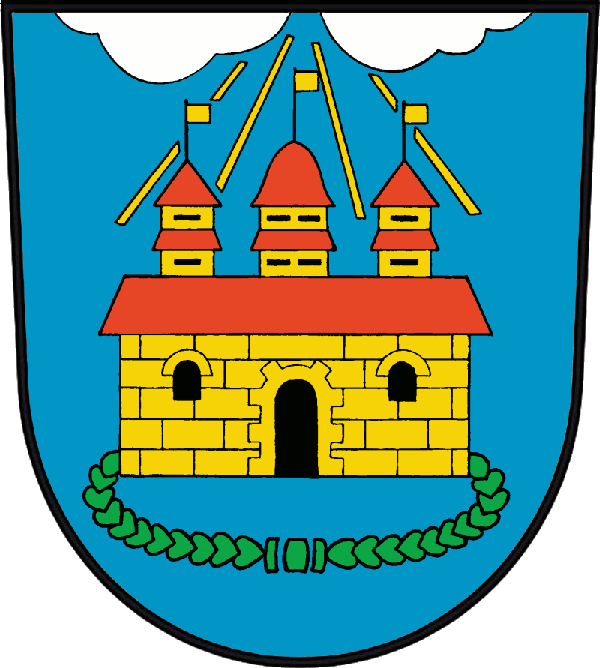
- Coat of arms

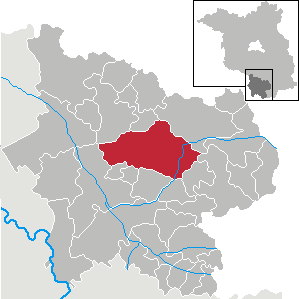
- Location of Doberlug-Kirchhain within Elbe-Elster district
- Interactive map of Doberlug-Kirchhain
- Location within Germany Location within Brandenburg
- Coordinates: 51°37′N 13°34′E
- Country: Germany
- State: Brandenburg
- District: Elbe-Elster
- Subdivisions: 10 Ortsteile

Government
  - Mayor (2017–25): Bodo Broszinski (FDP)

Area
  - Total: 150.36 km^{2} (58.05 sq mi)
- Elevation: 97 m (318 ft)

Population (2025-12-31)
  - Total: 8,117
  - Density: 53.98/km^{2} (139.8/sq mi)
- Time zone: UTC+01:00 (CET)
  - Summer (DST): UTC+02:00 (CEST)
- Postal codes: 03253
- Dialling codes: 035322
- Vehicle registration: EE, FI, LIB
- Website: www.doberlug-kirchhain.de

Doberlug-Kirchhain (German pronunciation: [ˈdoːbɐlʊk ˈkɪʁçhaɪn]; Lower Sorbian: Dobrjoług-Góstkow) is a town in the district of Elbe-Elster, Lower Lusatia, Brandenburg, in eastern Germany.

== History ==
In 937, the town of Kirchhain was built by Margrave Gero. A document written in 1005 mentions the town Doberlug (Dobraluh) for the first time. During the German–Polish War of 1003–1005, allied forces of the Holy Roman Empire, Bavaria and Bohemia gathered in the area before launching a joint attack on Poland. During the German–Polish War of 1015–1018, Dobryług was an important defensive stronghold of Poland against the Germans, and it was protected from the west by additional field fortifications. In 1165 the Cistercian Dobrilugk Abbey was founded by Margrave Dietrich of Landsberg.

Early-20th-century view of the castle

In 1235 Kirchhain received market-rights. In 1431 the Hussites destroyed the town of Doberlug and the abbey was devastated. During the Thirty Years' War, in 1637 and 1643, the Swedes destroyed Kirchhain.

From 1815 to 1947, Doberlug and Kirchhain were part of the Prussian Province of Brandenburg. In 1848, the jurisdictions of Doberlug and Kirchhain were unified, but the actual merger of the two towns did not take place until over one hundred years later, in 1950.

During World War II, Kirchhain was taken by the Red Army on 23 April 1945.

From 1952 to 1990, Doberlug-Kirchhain was part of the Bezirk Cottbus of East Germany.

On August 28, 1992, the Amt Doberlug-Kirchhain was created to streamline the administration of the town together with the surrounding 8 small municipalities. Nexdorf and Frankena later joined as well. The municipalities incorporated into the town were Frankena (2000), Dübrichen, Hennersdorf, Nexdorf, Prießen and Werenzhain (2001), and Buchhain (2002). The remaining three municipalities Arenzhain, Trebbus and Lugau were incorporated on October 26, 2003, thus ending the history of the Amt.

== Demography ==
Development of Population since 1875 within the Current Boundaries (Blue Line: Population; Dotted Line: Comparison to Population Development of Brandenburg state; Grey Background: Time of Nazi rule; Red Background: Time of Communist rule)

Recent Population Development and Projections (Population Development before Census 2011 (blue line); Recent Population Development according to the Census in Germany in 2011 (blue bordered line); Official projections for 2005-2030 (yellow line); for 2017-2030 (scarlet line); for 2020-2030 (green line)

Doberlug-Kirchhain: Population development
within the current boundaries (2020)

Year	Pop.	±% p.a.
1875	9,024	—
1890	10,082	+0.74%
1910	11,320	+0.58%
1925	11,386	+0.04%
1933	12,007	+0.67%
1939	12,209	+0.28%
1946	16,328	+4.24%
1950	16,198	−0.20%
1964	13,457	−1.32%
1971	13,395	−0.07%
1981	12,560	−0.64%
1985	12,527	−0.07%
1989	12,086	−0.89%
1990	11,996	−0.74%
1991	11,752	−2.03%

Year	Pop.	±% p.a.
1992	11,628	−1.06%
1993	11,477	−1.30%
1994	11,259	−1.90%
1995	11,209	−0.44%
1996	11,135	−0.66%
1997	11,095	−0.36%
1998	11,130	+0.32%
1999	11,013	−1.05%
2000	10,936	−0.70%
2001	10,705	−2.11%
2002	10,494	−1.97%
2003	10,323	−1.63%
2004	10,137	−1.80%
2005	9,890	−2.44%
2006	9,764	−1.27%

Year	Pop.	±% p.a.
2007	9,530	−2.40%
2008	9,342	−1.97%
2009	9,225	−1.25%
2010	9,083	−1.54%
2011	8,982	−1.11%
2012	8,875	−1.19%
2013	8,759	−1.31%
2014	8,625	−1.53%
2015	8,746	+1.40%
2016	9,179	+4.95%
2017	9,033	−1.59%
2018	9,062	+0.32%
2019	8,920	−1.57%
2020	8,686	−2.62%

== Climate ==
Climate data for Doberlug-Kirchhain (1991–2020)
Month	Jan	Feb	Mar	Apr	May	Jun	Jul	Aug	Sep	Oct	Nov	Dec	Year
Mean daily maximum °C (°F)	3.4 (38.1)	5.0 (41.0)	9.2 (48.6)	15.3 (59.5)	19.7 (67.5)	23.1 (73.6)	25.3 (77.5)	25.1 (77.2)	20.1 (68.2)	14.3 (57.7)	8.1 (46.6)	4.4 (39.9)	14.4 (57.9)
Daily mean °C (°F)	0.6 (33.1)	1.5 (34.7)	4.6 (40.3)	9.5 (49.1)	13.9 (57.0)	17.3 (63.1)	19.4 (66.9)	19.0 (66.2)	14.5 (58.1)	9.6 (49.3)	4.9 (40.8)	1.8 (35.2)	9.7 (49.5)
Mean daily minimum °C (°F)	−2.4 (27.7)	−2.0 (28.4)	0.3 (32.5)	3.3 (37.9)	7.5 (45.5)	11.0 (51.8)	13.2 (55.8)	12.8 (55.0)	9.2 (48.6)	5.4 (41.7)	1.7 (35.1)	−0.9 (30.4)	4.9 (40.8)
Average precipitation mm (inches)	45.7 (1.80)	34.0 (1.34)	38.8 (1.53)	27.9 (1.10)	57.2 (2.25)	53.4 (2.10)	69.4 (2.73)	61.2 (2.41)	45.8 (1.80)	39.4 (1.55)	43.3 (1.70)	44.1 (1.74)	561.6 (22.11)
Average precipitation days (≥ 0.1 mm)	17.1	13.7	15.1	11.0	13.1	12.9	14.0	12.7	11.8	13.8	15.0	16.4	166.8
Average relative humidity (%)	84.5	80.6	77.0	70.5	70.5	70.0	69.0	69.9	76.6	82.3	87.1	86.2	77.8
Mean monthly sunshine hours	55.2	78.0	124.7	190.8	224.2	218.7	228.4	220.4	163.7	114.1	62.2	48.3	1,741.3
Source: NOAA

== Coat of arms ==
The coat of arms of the town shows the town hall with three towers topped with yellow flags. Below is a green ring. On top are two clouds and rays of the sun. The shield is blue, and shaped like a leather sheet, symbolizing the history of the city as a tannery center. The coat of arms was created in 1950 by combining the symbols of the coats of arms of Doberlug and Kirchhain: the green ring and the sun are taken from the arms of Doberlug, while the town hall is from those of Kirchhain.

== Twin towns ==
Doberlug-Kirchhain is twinned with Hemer in North Rhine-Westphalia and Kirchhain in Hesse.

== Notable natives and residents ==
=== Kirchhain ===
- Daniel Schade (1601–1662), Musician
- Karl Gustav von Berneck (1803–1871), writer
- Guido Jendritzko (born 1925), sculptor and painter
- Catrin Große (born 1964 in Finsterwalde), painter, graphic designer and sculptor

=== Doberlug ===
- Heinrich Clauren (1771–1854), also Carl Gottlieb Samuel Heun, writer
- Otto Fridolin Fritzsche (1812–1896), theologist
- Hermann Wilhelm Vogel (1834–1898), chemist
- Eduard Köllner, (1839–1891), composer of Festhymne zur 100 jährigen Jubelfeier der Unabhängigkeitserklärung der Vereinigten Staaten Nordamerikas (Hymn for the Independence Day 1876)

== Photogallery ==
Church of Dobrilugk Abbey

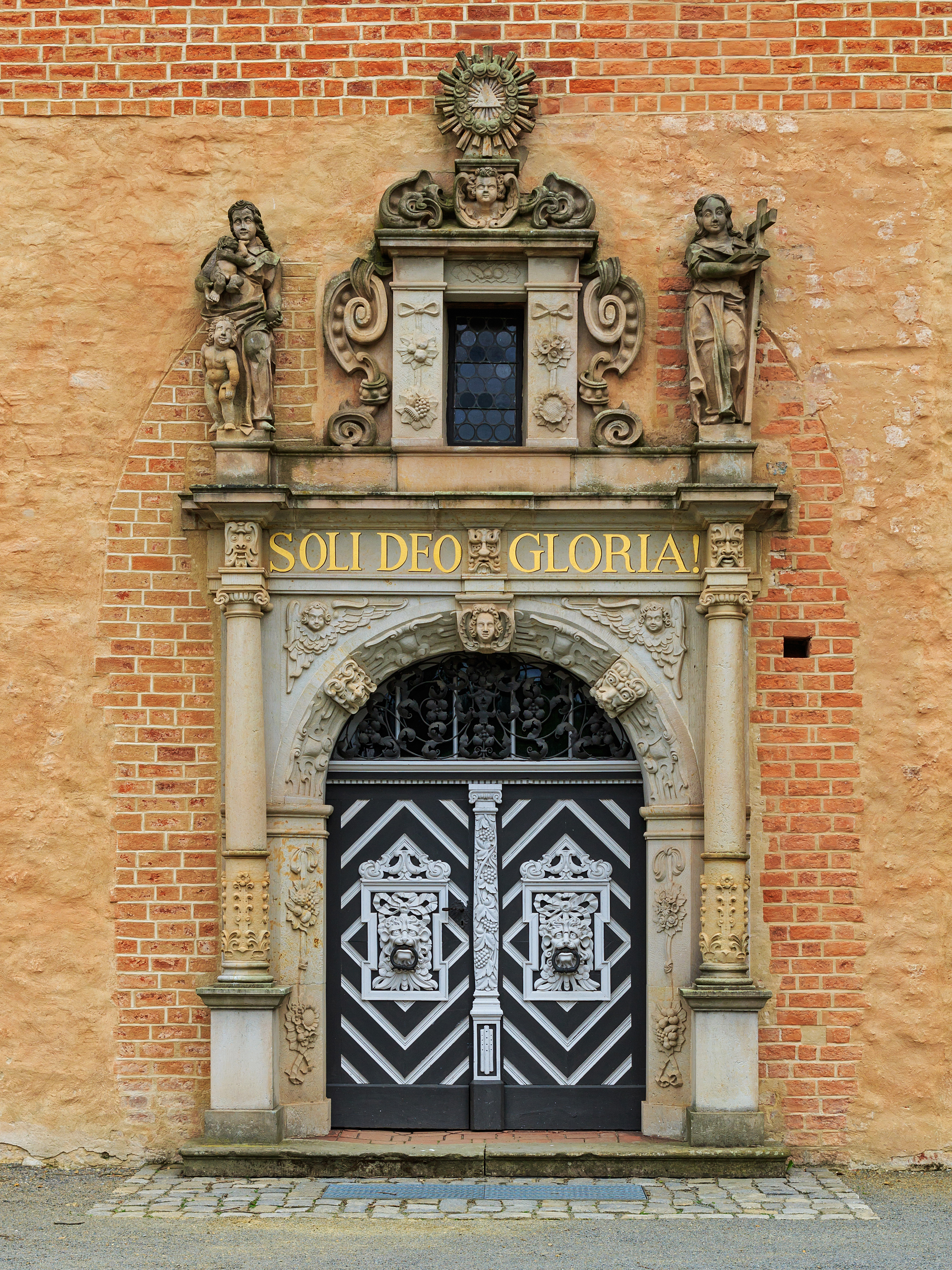
Church Gate of Dobrilugk Abbey

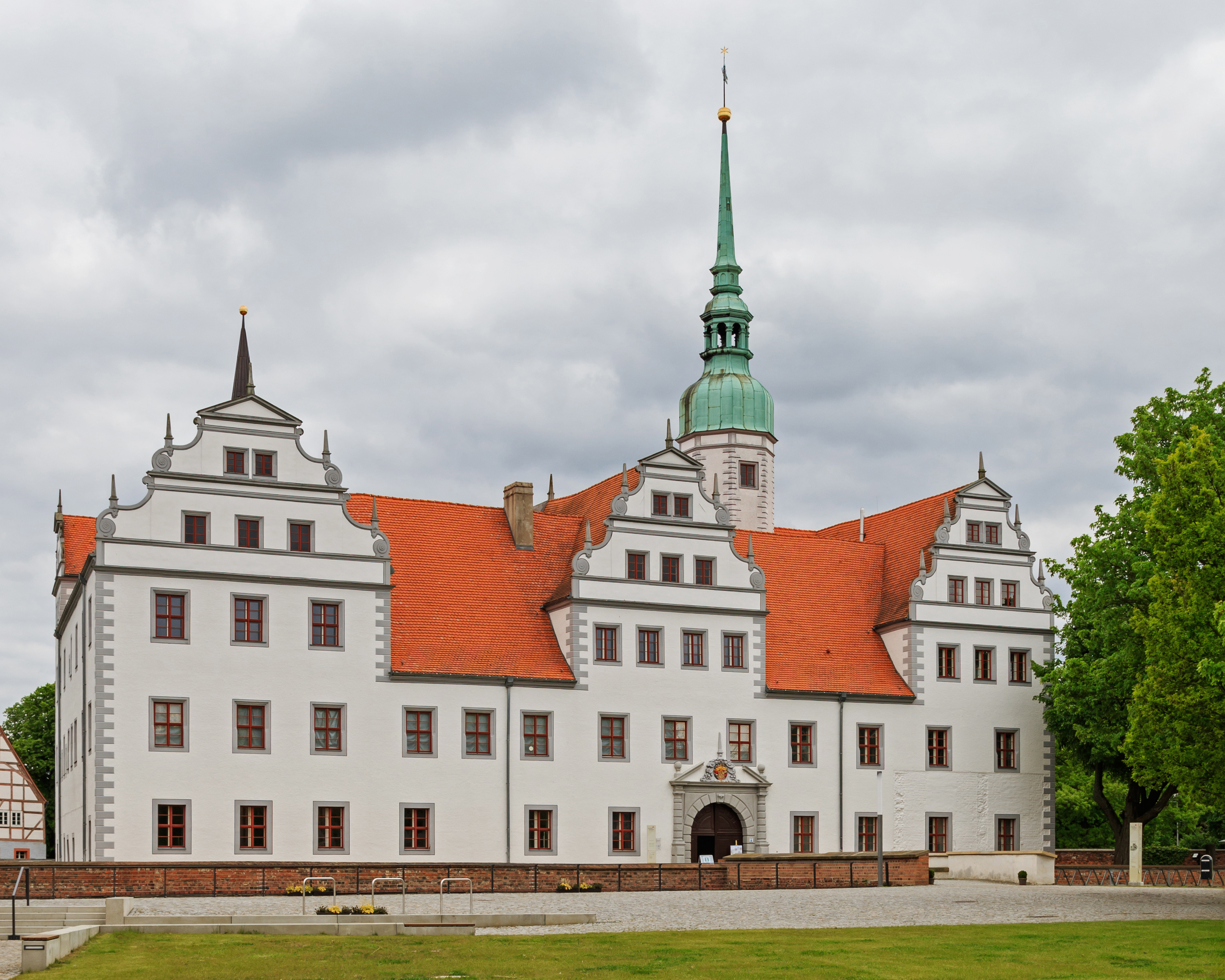
Castle of Doberlug in May 2015

Post milestone from 1736 with the coats of arms of the Polish–Lithuanian Commonwealth and Electorate of Saxony
