= Peer Smed =

Danish-American silversmith and metalworker (1878–1943)

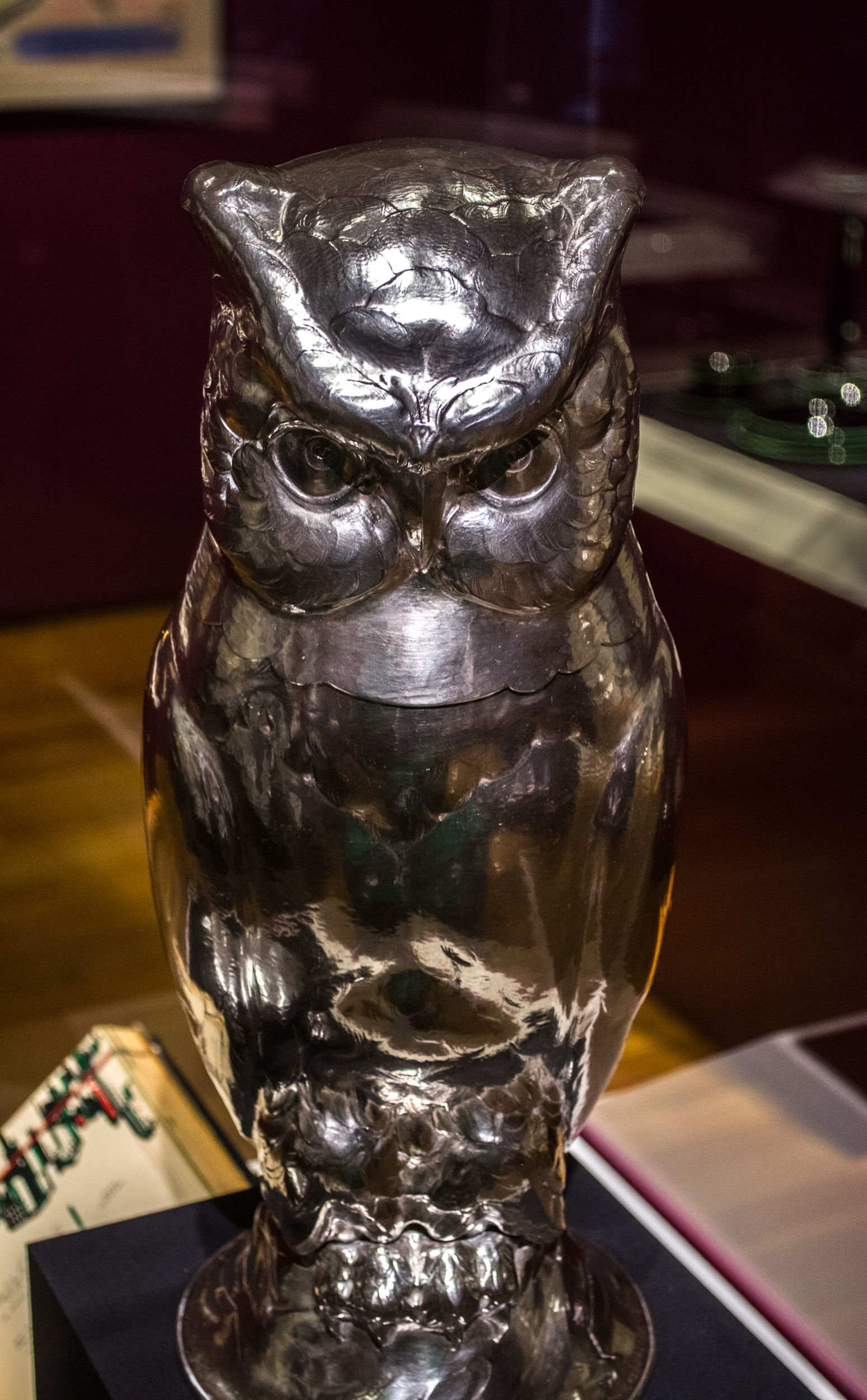
Cocktail shaker by Peer Smed, 1931

Peer Smed (1878 – November 17, 1943) was a Danish-American silversmith and metalworker, active in New York City.

Smed was born as Peer Schmidt in Copenhagen, where he trained with the royal silversmiths as a peer to Georg Jensen. In 1903 he immigrated to the United States, where he opened a gold chasing business on Maiden Lane in New York City. He remained in New York until 1907, then returned to Denmark, but in 1909 moved again to Brooklyn where he established his workshop at 176 Johnson Street. There he produced handcrafted silver and metalwork until late in his life when he moved to 30 Irving Place in New York City. His New York Times obituary described him "as a gold carver, a silversmith and as a designer of iron grilles," but he also worked in copper and bronze, and even ivory. In addition, he acted as an industrial designer for Tiffany & Co. and the International Silver Company. He also created the flatware and holloware for the Waldorf-Astoria Hotel in 1932, working with Frederick William Stark, and made the bronze doors designed by William Zorach for the entrance to the Schwarzenbach Buildings.

His work is collected in the Art Institute of Chicago, Brooklyn Museum of Art, Metropolitan Museum of Art, and Dallas Museum of Art.
