= Octave Landuyt =

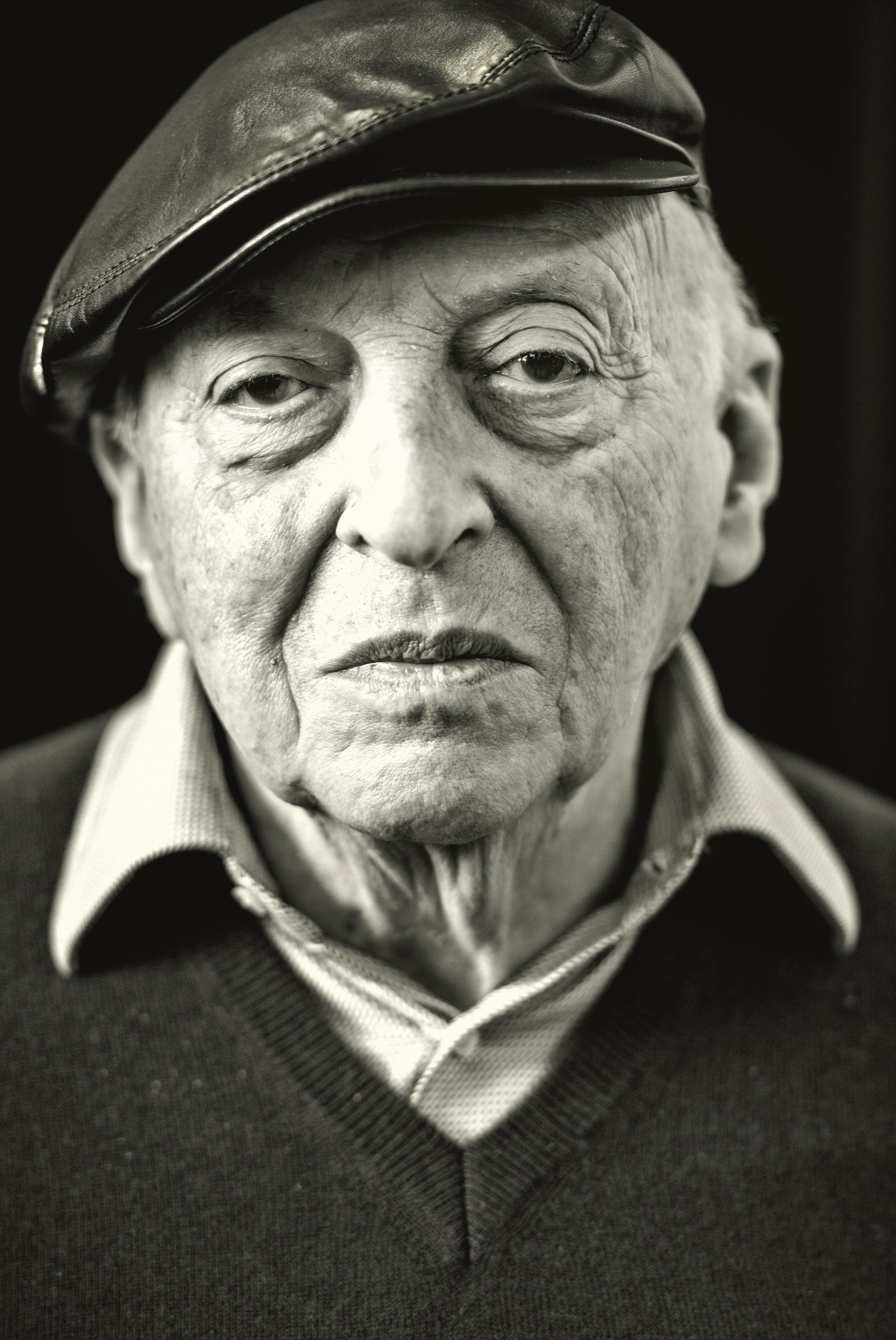
Landuyt in 2014

Octave Landuyt (26 December 1922 – 6 August 2024) was a Flemish painter, sculptor (bronze and ceramics), jewellery designer, graphic artist, industrial designer and designer of stage sets, costumes, textiles, furniture and carpets. He received various distinctions and prizes and represented in numerous museums and art collections in Belgium and internationally. Landuyt completed a full career as a teacher, initially at the Royal Athenaeum of Kortrijk, and from 1954 at the State Normal School in Ghent (now HoGent).

In 2022, the exhibition "Aurum Flandriae" was held in Antwerp in honor of his hundredth birthday.

Landuyt died on 6 Augusts 2024 at the age of 101 years old.
