= Ger Lataster =

Dutch painter (1920–2012)

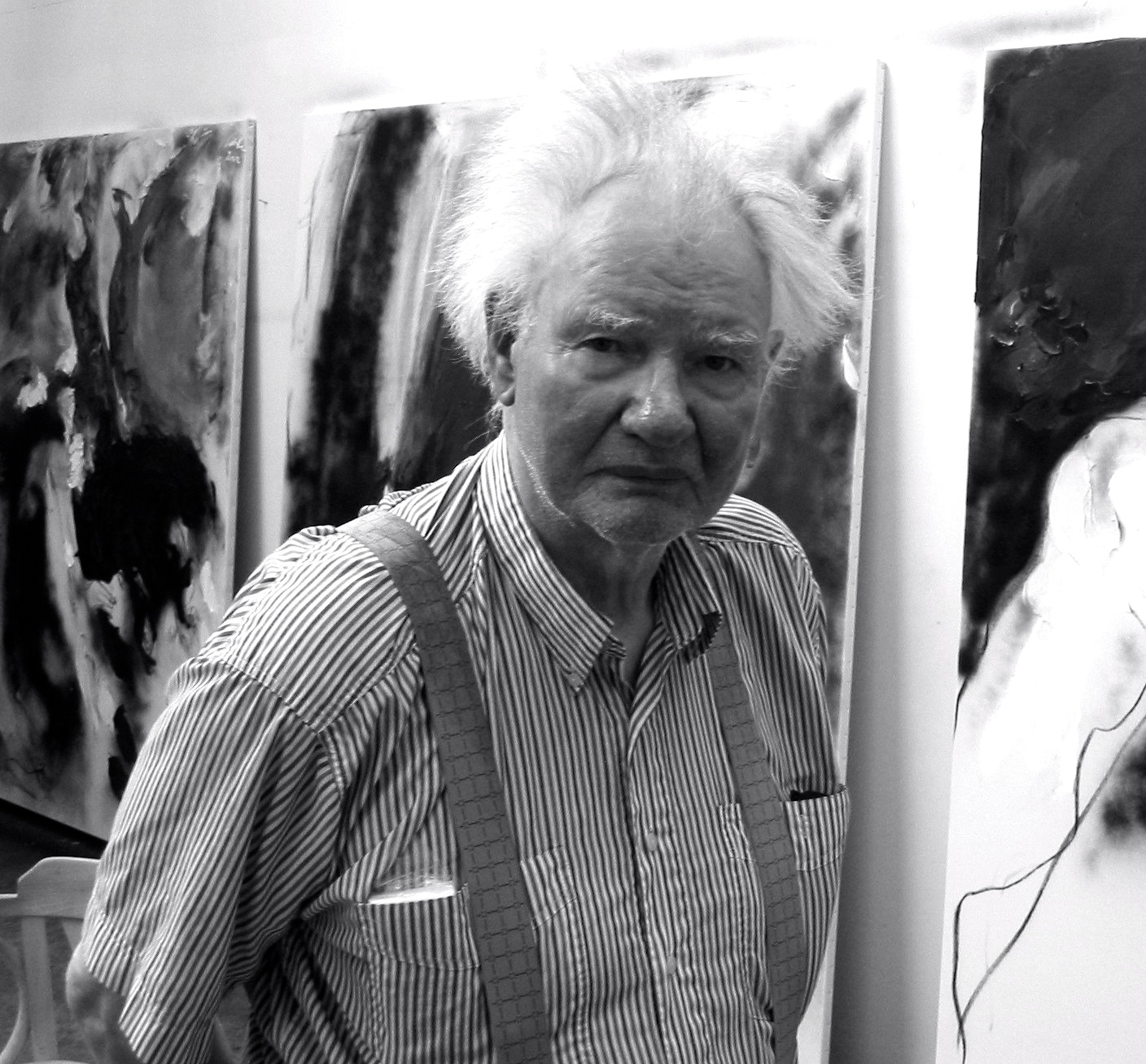
- Lataster in 1987
- Born: Ger Lataster; 16 February 1920; Schaesberg, Netherlands
- Died: 19 March 2012 (aged 92); Amsterdam, Netherlands
- Education: Rijksakademie
- Known for: Painting, drawing, engraving
- Movement: CoBrA

Gerard (Ger) Lataster (Schaesberg, February 16, 1920 – Amsterdam, March 19, 2012) was a Dutch painter linked to the informal art movement.

== Biography ==
The son of a miner, Lataster studied at the School of Applied Arts in Maastricht. He then went to Amsterdam where he studied at the Royal Academy of Fine Arts, Amsterdam, from February 1941 to August 1946. In 1948 and 1949, he received a Royal Grant for painting. He is considered one of the "Limburgers of Amsterdam," along with Pieter Defesche, Jef Diederen, and Lei Molin. In the early 1950s, he traveled to France on scholarships and resided for a time in Paris.

Practicing colorful and expressive abstract painting, his work has been associated with the Cobra group and, to a lesser extent, the Zero movement, although he has always remained independent and refused to be associated with any organised art movement.

In the 1950s, he was championed by Willem Sandberg, director of the Stedelijk Museum in Amsterdam, who presented his works in 1958 at the exhibition 50 jaar Verkenningen. In 1972, the same museum dedicated a monographic exhibition to him, the catalogue of which was edited by Jean-Jacques Lévêque. In 1959, Lataster participated in the second edition of documenta in Kassel. In 1963, alongside Mari Andriessen, Nic Jonk, Theo Mulder, and Wessel Couzijn, he founded the Academy for Alternative Art Education '63' (later called Ateliers '63) in Haarlem, now De Ateliers in Amsterdam. This initiative was motivated by the desire to meet the need of young artists to work for a period of time under the critical guidance of more experienced artists. In 1983, he became a professor of painting at the Rijksakademie. In 1994, the Dordrecht Museum dedicated a retrospective to him entitled Lataster (1952 – 1993) while in Paris the Institut Néerlandais dedicated another to him in 1999.

His work is represented in numerous museum collections in the Netherlands and abroad, including the Stedelijk Museum in Amsterdam, the Bonnefantenmuseum in Maastricht, the Mauritshuis in The Hague, the Museum of Modern Art in New York and the Carnegie Museum of Art in Pittsburgh (The Watchdog of the Beloved, 1958). Lataster worked with major international galleries, such as Paul Facchetti's in Paris and Zurich (from 1960 to 1979), and exhibited his work in the Netherlands, France, the United States, Canada, Germany, the United Kingdom, Belgium, Switzerland, Italy, Russia, Ireland, Norway, Finland, Israel, Brazil, Argentina, and South Africa. His works are regularly shown in national and international exhibitions, and he is considered one of the most famous Dutch artists of his generation. Private collectors who have owned his works include David Rockefeller.

Lataster's famous works include the painting "Children Playing" (1954, commissioned by the municipality of Heerlen), the four-part painting "Women's Hair," "The Poets' Glasses," and "The Workers' Shoes," "Everyone's Ashes" (1976, Bonnefantenmuseum, Maastricht), and the monumental ceiling painting "Atlantic Icarus," painted for the Mauritshuis in The Hague in 1987-1988.

Lataster was appointed Knight of the Order of the Dutch Lion on June 11, 2010, at the opening of the exhibition "Who's Afraid of Ger Lataster?" at the Grote Barbarakerk in Culemborg. That same year, he received the honorary decoration of the Order of Merit from the City of Amsterdam.

He died at the age of 92 in Amsterdam in 2012.

On the occasion of the 100th anniversary of his birth in 2020, a dual retrospective exhibition of his work was held at the Bonnefantenmuseum and the Gouvernement aan de Maas in Maastricht.

== Works in museums ==
- Stedelijk Museum, Amsterdam
- Buffalo AKG Art Museum, Buffalo
- Harvard Art Museums, Cambridge, Massachusetts
- Kunstmuseum Den Haag, The Hague
- Mauritshuis, The Hague
- Museum Schunk, Heerlen
- Bonnefantenmuseum, Maastricht
- Minneapolis Institute of Art, Minneapolis
- Museum of Modern Art, New York
- Fonds national d'art contemporain, Centre national des arts plastiques, Paris
- Carnegie Museum of Art, Pittsburgh
