= Maasdorf (Bad Liebenwerda) =

District of Bad Liebenwerda, Brandenburg, Germany

- District
- Location of Maasdorf in Bad Liebenwerda
- Elevation: 90 m (300 ft)

Population
  - Total: 404
- Postal code: 04924
- Area code: 035341

Maasdorf is a district of the town of Bad Liebenwerda in the Elbe-Elster district of Brandenburg, Germany, located three kilometres northeast of the town on the Kleine Elster river within the Niederlausitzer Heidelandschaft Nature Park.

Maasdorf was part of the Bad Liebenwerda district until its incorporation in 1993 and currently has 464 inhabitants.

== History ==
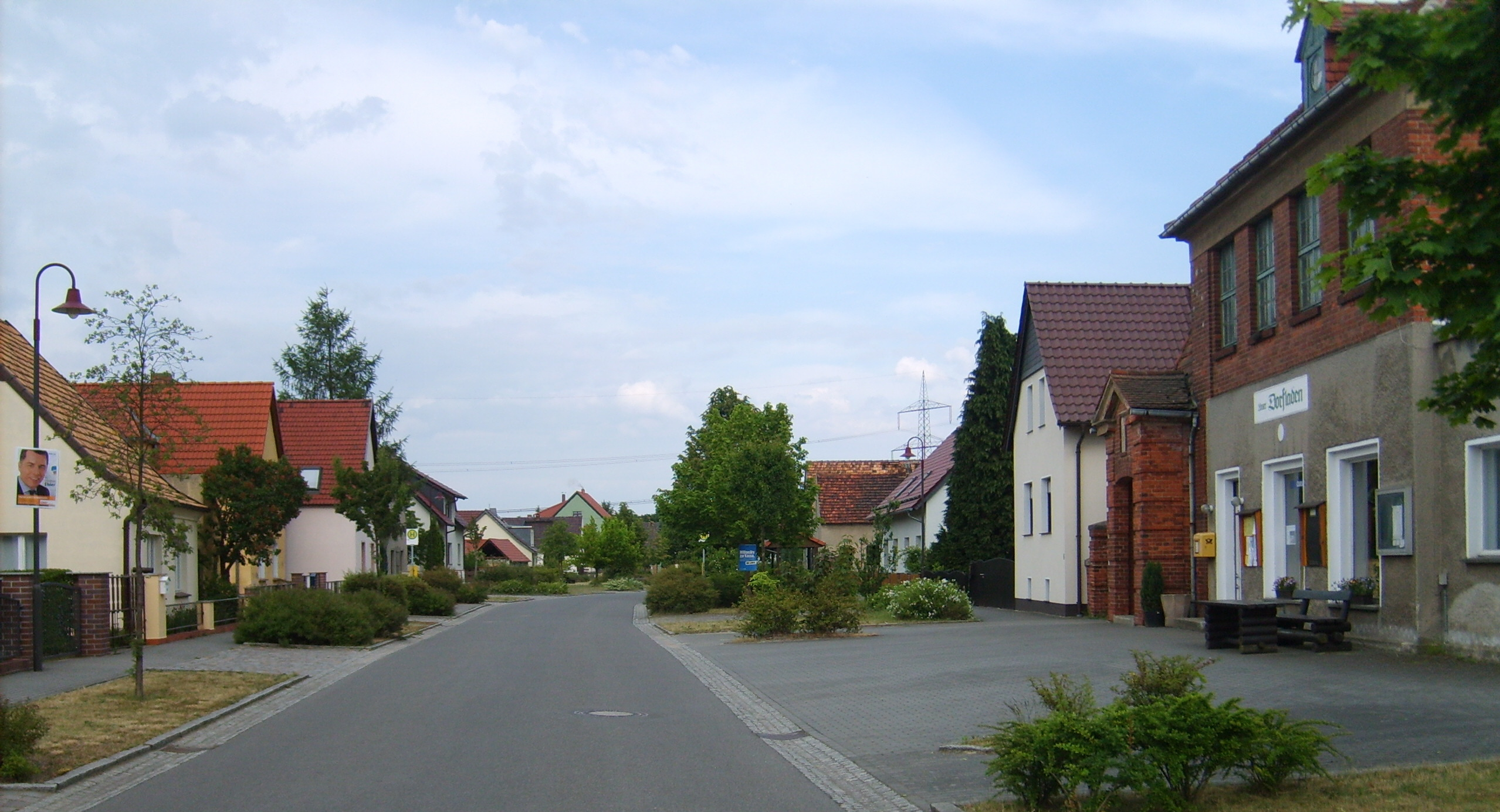
Maasdorf

Maasdorf was first documented in 1376 as Mostorph. The origin of the name, likely German, is undocumented, but various spellings have appeared over time: 1376 Mostorph, 1378 Mostorf, 1391 Mannstorf, 1402 Mansdorff, 1442 Mastorff, 1457 Monstorff, 1529 Maßdorff, 1550 Masdorff, and 1752 Maasdorff.

The village was originally owned by the Ileburger noble family, part of the Upper Saxon nobility, who controlled Liebenwerda Castle. Residents of Maasdorf were subject to the Dingstuhl court in Dobra, which also governed Dobra, Liebenwerda’s suburbs (Stadtwinkel and Freiwinkel), Zeischa, and Zobersdorf. Frequent flooding from the Kleine Elster (formerly Dober), a tributary of the Schwarze Elster, prompted the construction of a 122.5-ell-long dam in 1789 to protect the village.

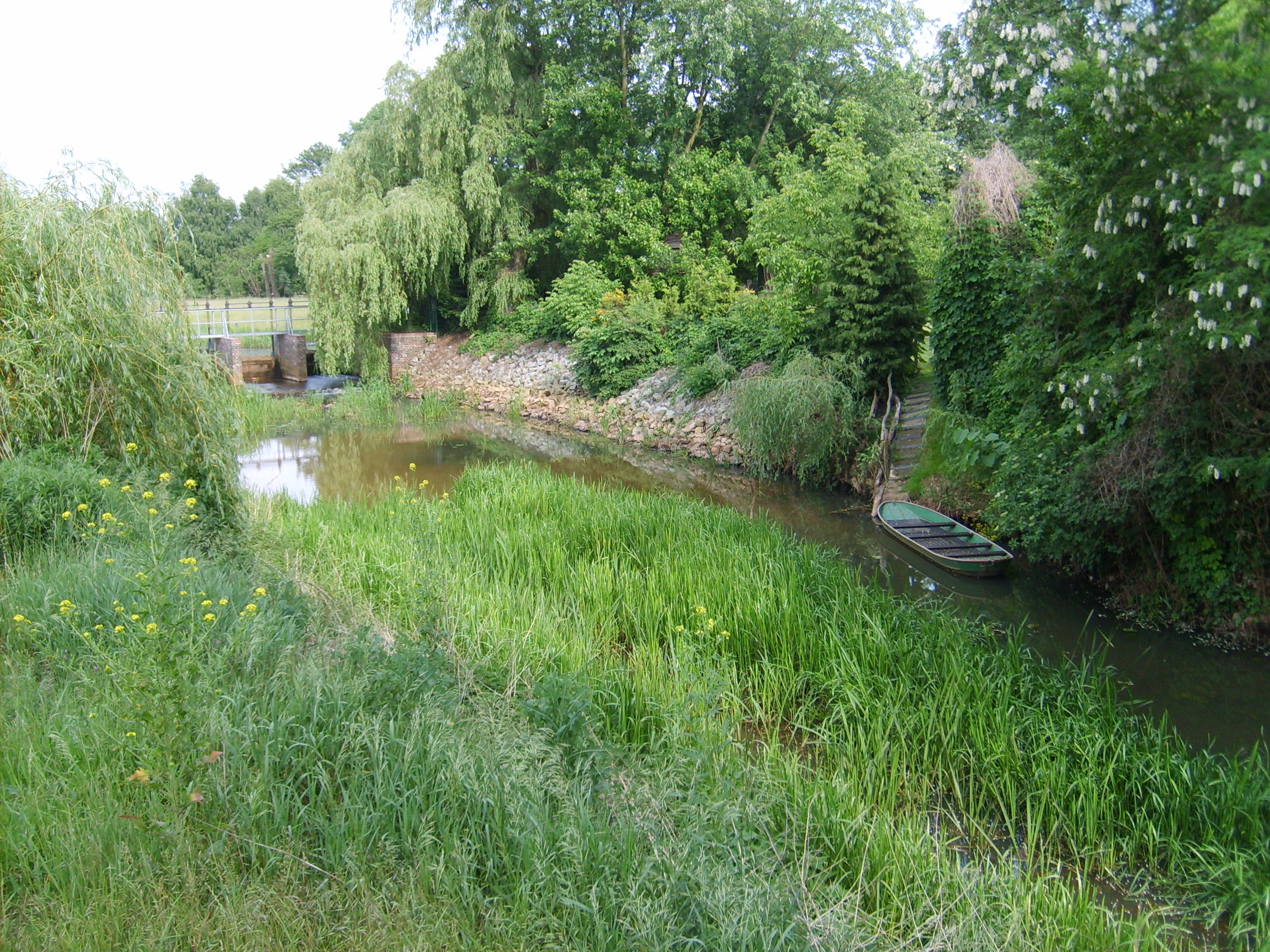
Kleine Elster

Maasdorf suffered multiple devastating fires. In 1457, a fire destroyed the entire village, with reconstruction aided by the Wahrenbrück parish, to which Maasdorf belonged. Lacking a local church, residents attended services in Wahrenbrück and buried their dead there, along a path still called ‘Leichenweg’ (corpse path). After the first church visitation in 1529, Maasdorf was reassigned to the Liebenwerda parish. Additional fires in February 1609 destroyed 17 houses, and in January 1856, six farmsteads were lost.

From 1875, the Knissen colony was part of Maasdorf but was incorporated into Thalberg in 1936, becoming an independent municipality with its farmland.

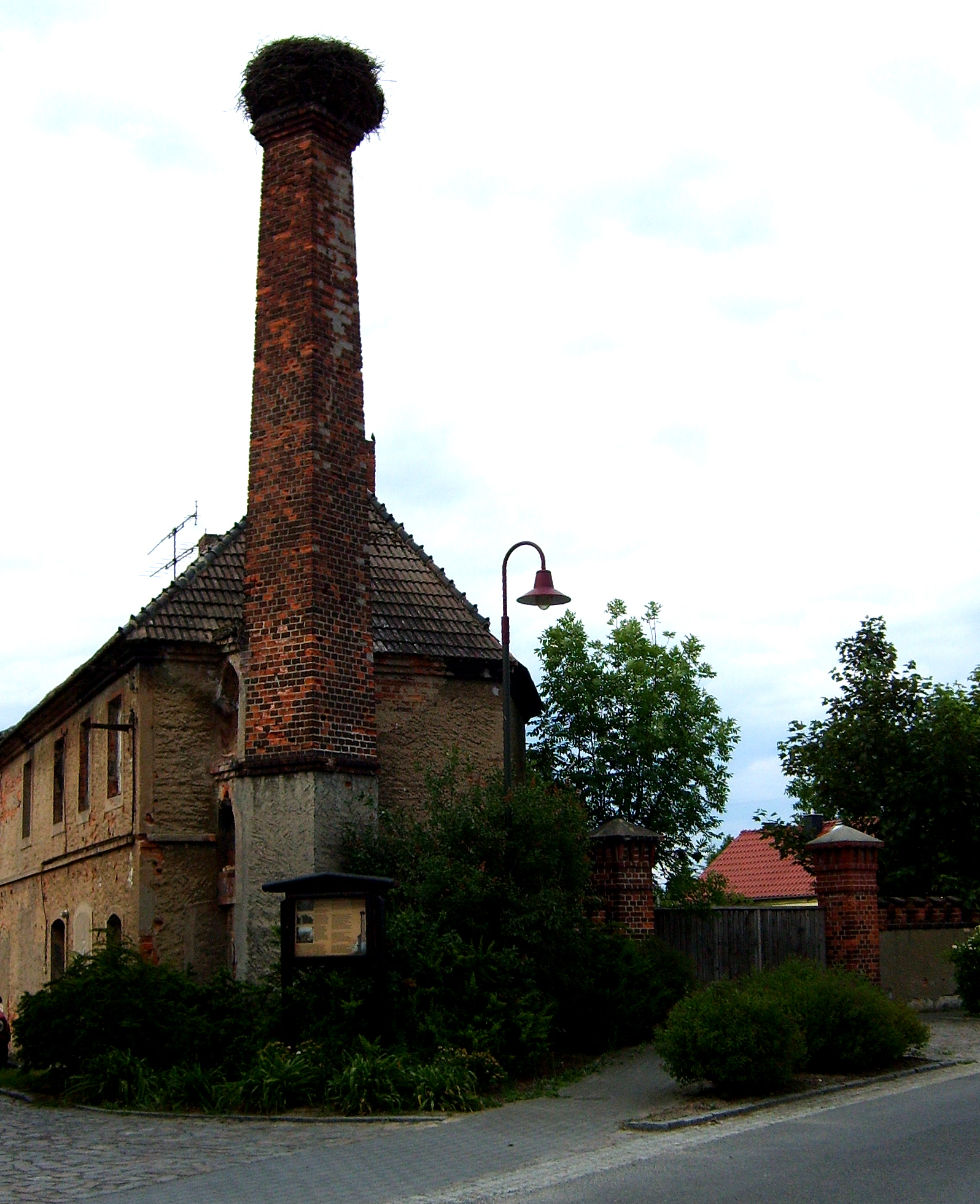
Stork's nest on the chimney of the old estate distillery

On 22 April 1945, shortly before World War II ended, the Red Army entered Maasdorf, confiscating horses and burning a plot with an abandoned military vehicle. On 11 May 1945, Russian soldiers shot the village schoolteacher, Karl Drechsler, in the school garden in front of his wife.

The land reform in the Bad Liebenwerda district began in the autumn of 1945, expropriating estates over 100 hectares, including buildings, livestock, and equipment. In Maasdorf, 157 hectares, including the estate of Paul Weiland, were redistributed. The Mittelhausen Pond estate, owned by the von Kuczkowski noble family, was also affected.

In 1993, during Brandenburg’s district reform, Maasdorf was incorporated into Bad Liebenwerda, alongside Dobra, Kosilenzien, Kröbeln, Lausitz, Möglenz, Neuburxdorf, Oschätzchen, Prieschka, Thalberg, Theisa, Zeischa, and Zobersdorf.

=== Population development ===
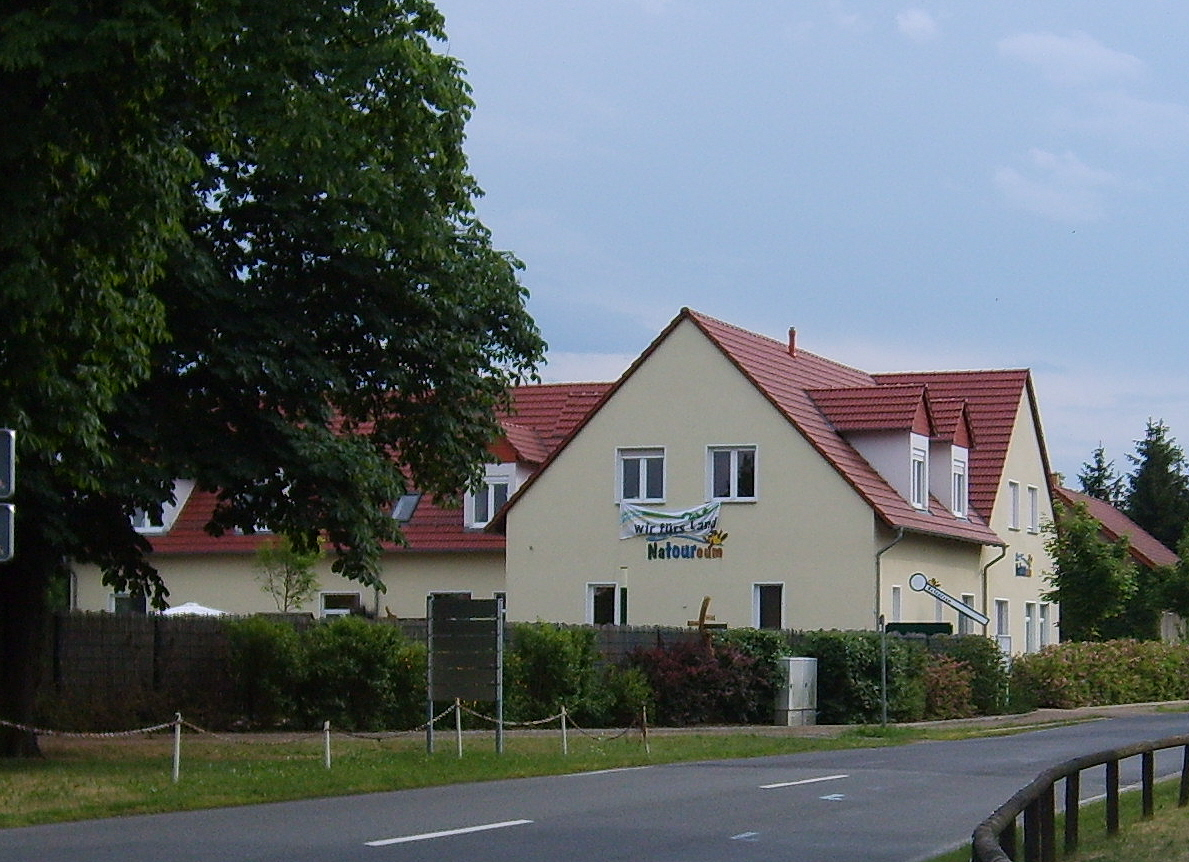
Elster-Natoureum

In 1835, Maasdorf had 43 houses, 211 inhabitants, 44 horses, 196 cattle, 425 sheep, 13 goats, and 98 pigs.

Population development of Maasdorf since 1875
Year	Residents	Year	Residents	Year	Residents
1875	500	1946	623	1989	522
1890	600	1950	641	1990	510
1910	700	1964	556	1991	491
1925	837	1971	546	1992	494
1933	922	1981	535	2005	477
1939	982	1985	525	2010	444

== Culture and places of interest ==
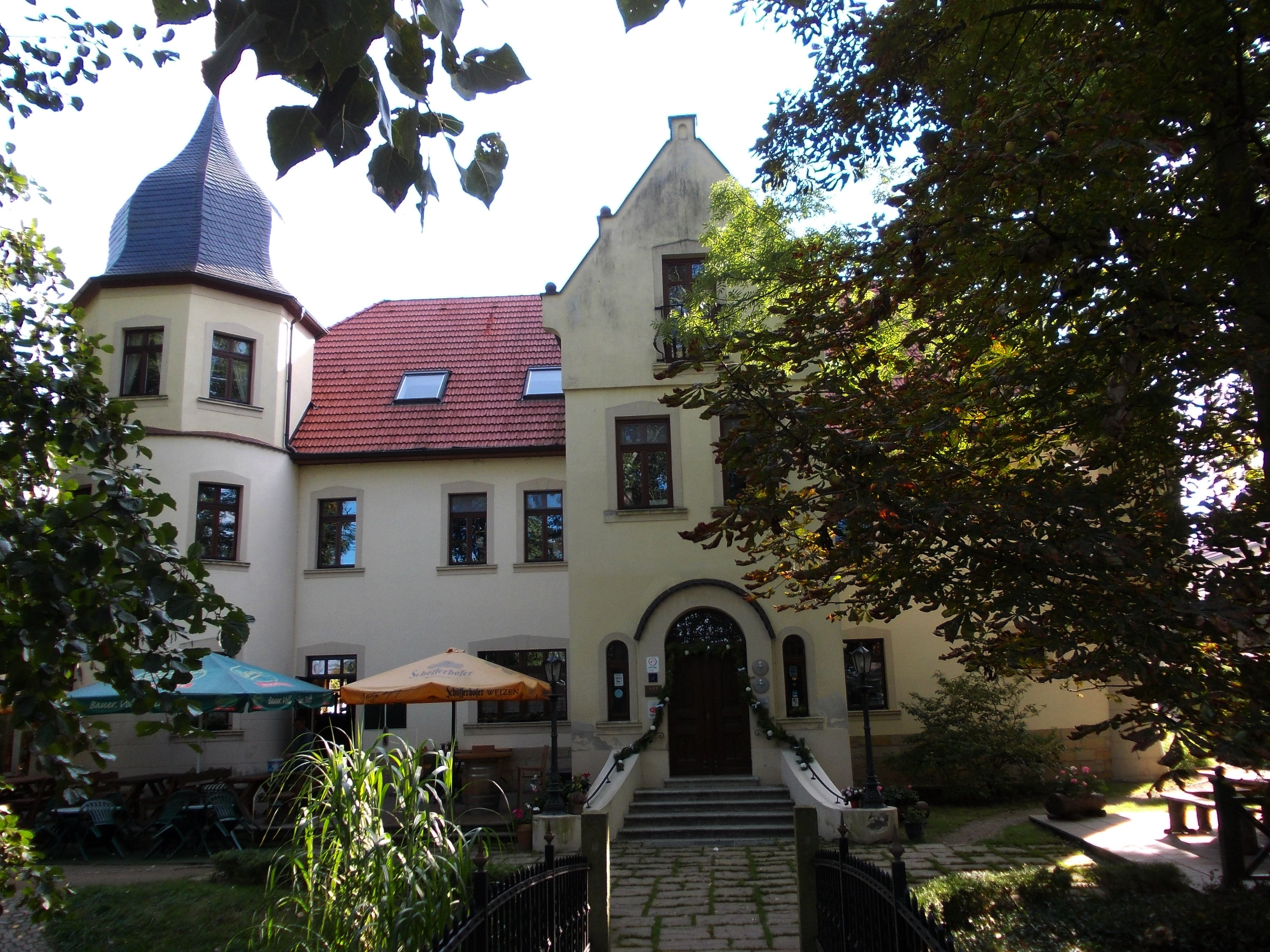
Maasdorf Manor (‘Parkschlösschen’)

The Maasdorf manor, known as the ‘Parkschlösschen’ (little park castle), is a notable landmark on the Mühlgraben. Documented around 1701, it was owned by the von Seydewitz noble family before 1692, when Damm Friedrich and Christian Friedrich von Seydewitz sought enfeoffment of the estate. By the mid-19th century, the von Rohrscheidt family owned it, and in 1898, Paul Weiland, owner of the Liebenwerda cement factory, purchased it. His South Tyrolean wife added Italian-style turrets, giving it a castle-like appearance. The manor remained with the Weiland family until the 1945 land reform. The Teichgut Mittelhausen estate (87 hectares) was owned by Wilhelm von Borries-Dalldorf in the 1920s, then by the von Kuczkowski family. In 1984, the manor became the Restaurant Parkschlösschen, now including a hotel.

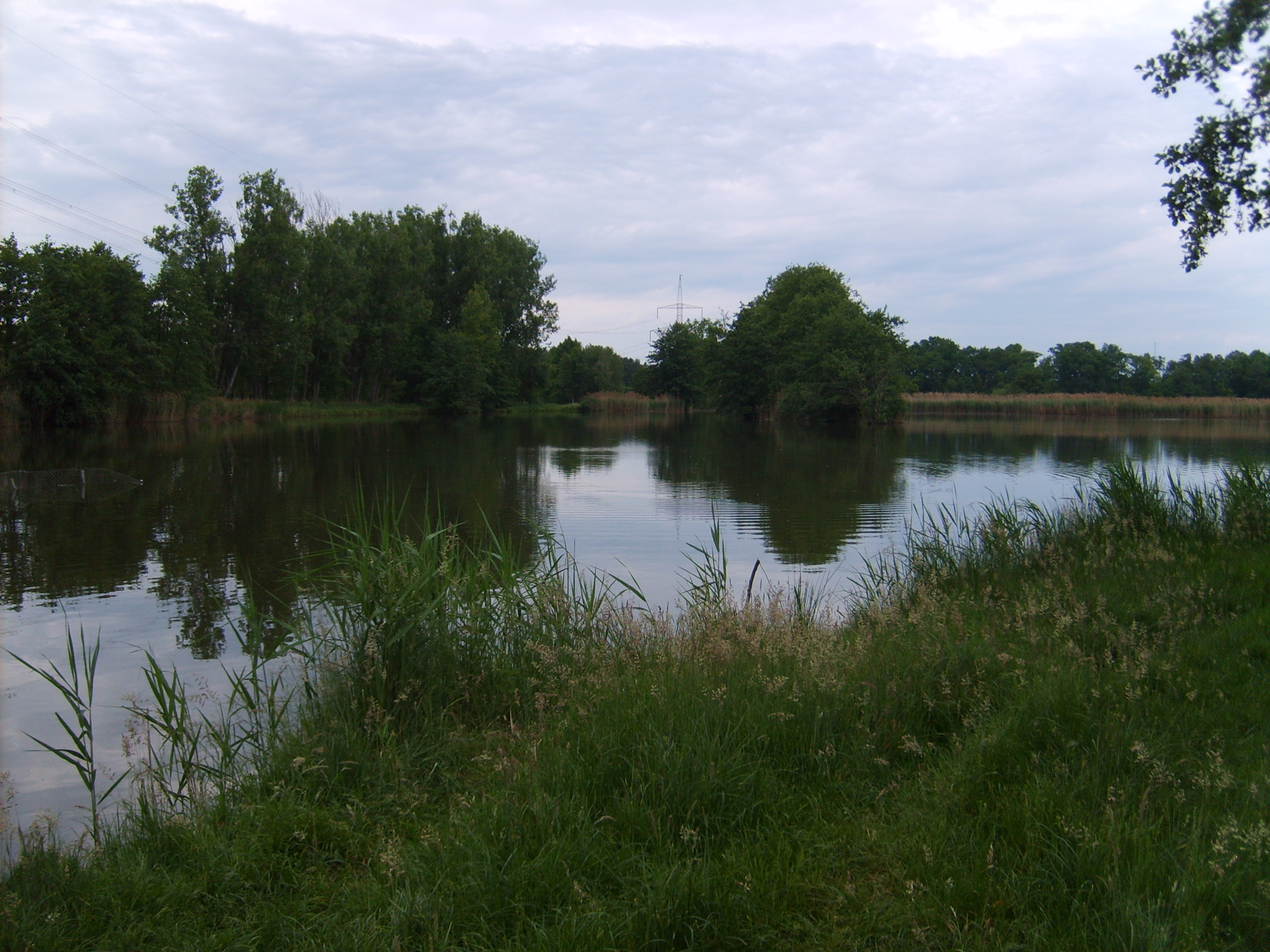
Maasdorf ponds

The Maasdorf Elster-Natoureum, opened in 2005, showcases the Elbe-Elster region in miniature with the motto “See nature, experience nature, learn from nature.” It includes a 320-meter-long LGB garden railway with a 45 mm track gauge.

The Maasdorfer Teiche ponds, built-in 1543 for fish farming near the former Knissen district, are a popular destination for visitors.

The Maasdorf cemetery features a war memorial stele honouring 34 residents who died in World War I and 40 in World War II.

== Personalities ==
- Friedrich von Rohrscheidt (1815–1880), Royal Prussian District Administrator of Liebenwerda (1843–1851), lord of the Maasdorf manor, and later Privy Councillor. His descendants owned the Garzau estate.

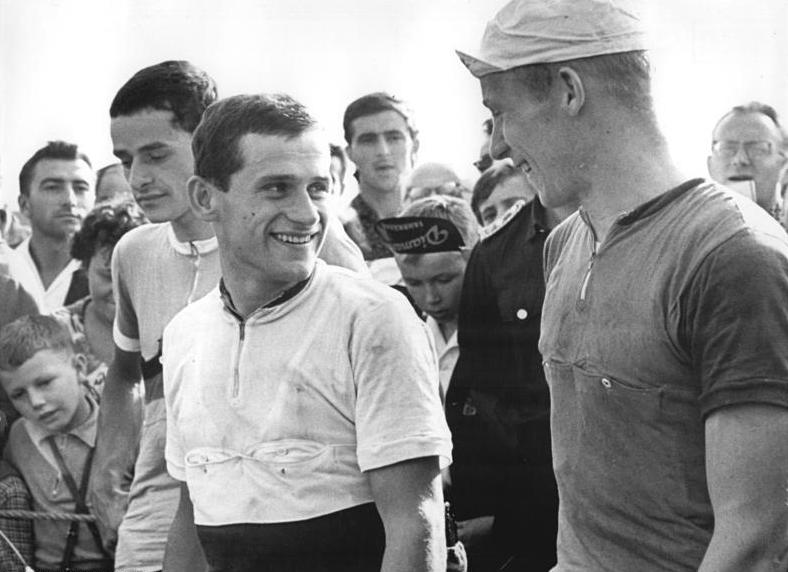
Axel Peschel (right, with Siegfried Huster)
