= Schroeter family =

German noble family

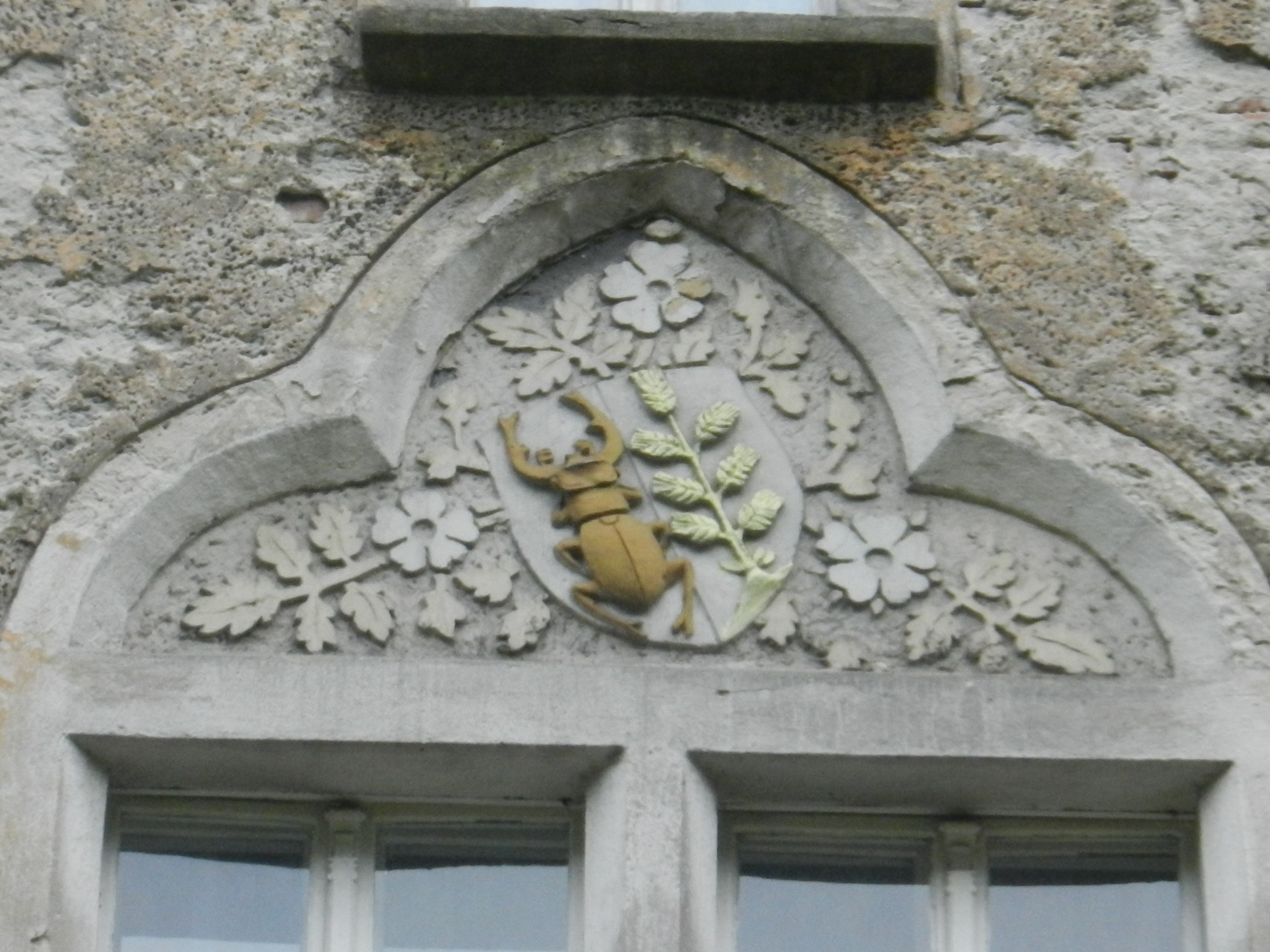
Schroeter Coat of Arms on the "Burg am Buchenwald" in Trzebnica

The von Schroeter family is a German noble family originally from the region of Wroclaw.

== History ==
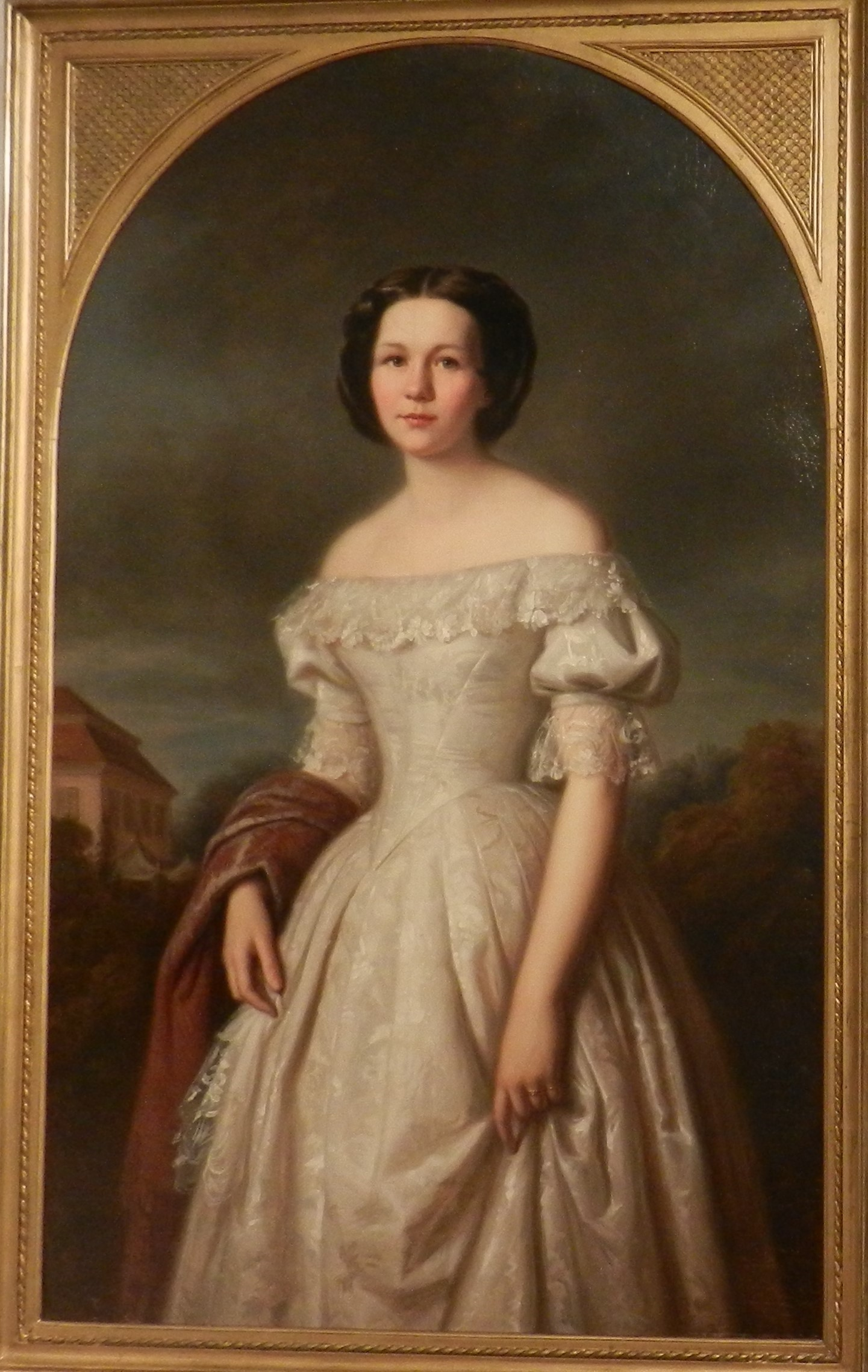
Portrait of Berta Elisabeth von Schroeter, by Ernst Resch, 1856, National Museum Wroclaw

The earliest known ancestor of the family is Heinrich Schroeter (1620-1680), a burgher and merchant in Rawitsch. In the 17th century Rawitsch became a place of refuge for Protestants and other opposed faiths from Bohemia and Silesia who fled from Habsburg oppression. Later sons of the family were given the name "Sigismund" in memory of a prince who had protected Protestants at that time, possibly the king of Poland Sigismund II. August and the Elector of Brandenburg Johann Sigismund.

Also notable is the Protestant theologian and scholar Sigismund Gottlieb Schroeter (1694-1760), grandson of Heinrich Schroeter. Sigismund Gottlieb was pastor in the Church of Peace in Jawor, one of the most important churches in Silesia, today part of the UNESCO World Heritage. Until a burglary in 1962, a painting of "Archidiaconus Schroeter" had hung in the vestry of the Church for 250 years.

The first noble line is descendant of Heinrich von Schroeter, who was elevated to Prussian nobility by Emperor Wilhelm II on January 18, 1901. The second line is decentant of Paul von Schroeter, who was raised to nobility on 11 June 1902, this line has been extinct in the male line since his death in 1907. Both were sons of the Wroclaw patrician Hermann Sigismund Schroeter (1824-1880), Lord of Oswitz, Protsch and Weida, and Berta Elisabeth née Korn (1832-1914), granddaughter of Friedrich August Karl von Kospoth.

== Notable family members ==
- Heinrich von Schroeter (1856–1945), Prussian official, Landrat, chief of police of Kiel and Honorary Commander of the Royal Victorian Order
- Paul von Schroeter (1858–1907), Prussian official and owner of a Fideicommissum
- Günther von Schroeter (1888–1940), Prussian Senior government official (Oberregierungsrat) and Landrat
- Hans-Erich von Schroeter (1891–1947), German major general
- Hans-Ulrich von Schroeter (* 1967), German Ambassador to Gabon and São Tomé and Príncipe

== See also ==
- Schroeter, list of people with the surname
