= Schroeter =

Schroeter is a German surname, an orthographic variant of Schröter, associated with the Schroeter family. Notable people with the surname include:

- Charles Schroeter (1837–1921), American soldier
- Georg Schroeter (born 1950), German politician
- Harm G. Schroeter (active from 1981), Norwegian academic in economic history
- Heinrich von Schroeter (1856–1945), Prussian official, Landrat, chief of police of Kiel and Honorary Commander of the Royal Victorian Order
- Horst von Schroeter (1919–2006), German U-boat commander
- Jens Fredrik Schroeter (1857–1927), Norwegian astronomer
- Johann Samuel Schroeter (c.1752–1788), German pianist and composer
- Karl-Ernst Schroeter (1912–1943), German naval officer who fought in World War II
- Paul Schroeter, German painter and etcher
- Paul Schroeter, German painter and etcher
- Rebecca Schroeter (1751–1826), British musician
- Reginald Schroeter (1921–2002), Canadian ice hockey player
- Werner Schroeter (1945–2010), German film director
