= Szreter =

Szreter is a Polish surname derived from the German surname Schröter. Archaic feminine forms (still used colloquially): Szreterowa/Szretrowa (after husband) and Szreterówna/ Szretrówna (after father). Notable people with the surname include:

- Jerzy Szreter (born 1945), Polish economist, statesman and social activist
- Karol Szreter, Polish classical pianist
- Simon Szreter, History professor

== See also ==
- Sreter
