= Stefan Sternberg =

German local politician

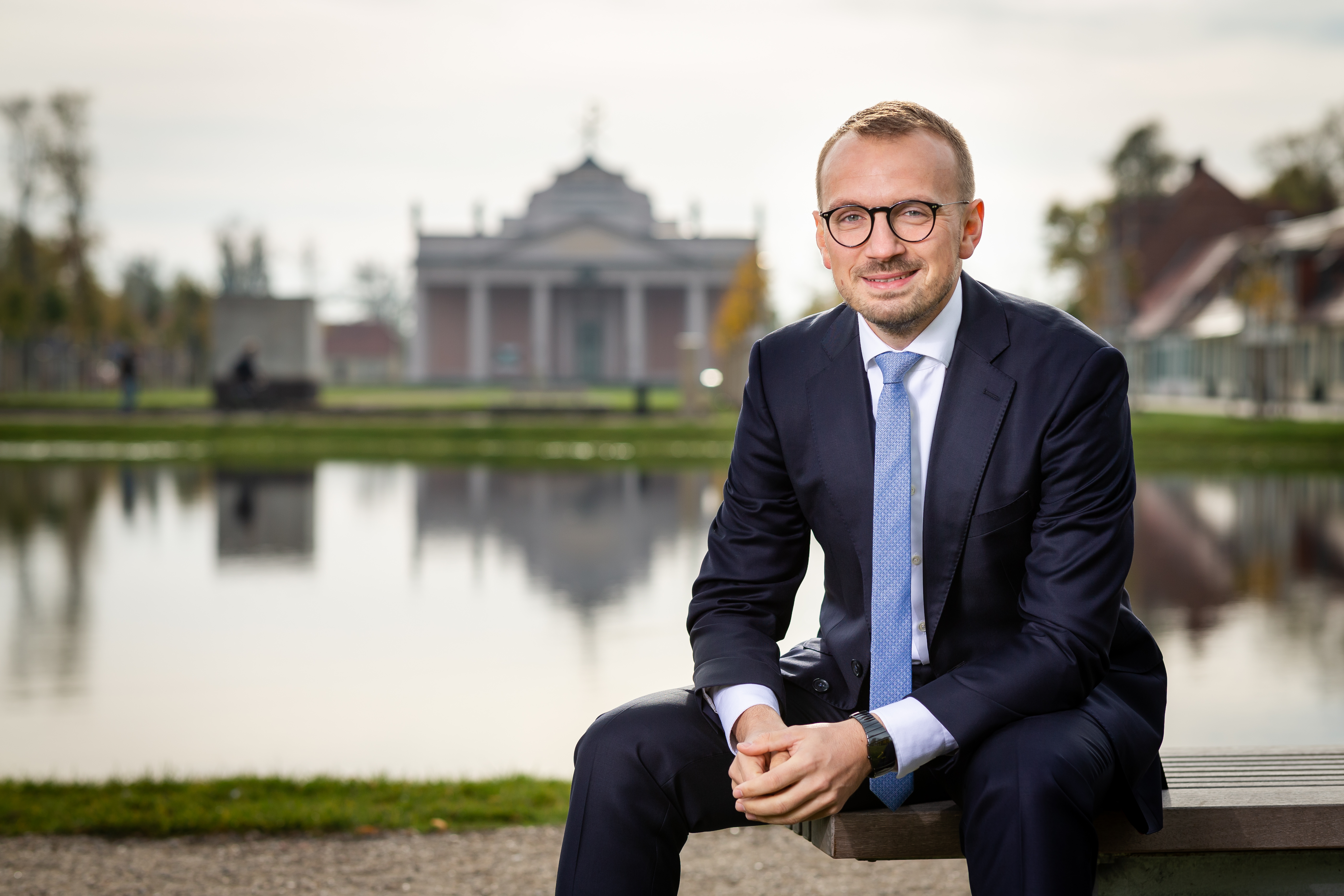
- Stefan Sternberg in Ludwigslust (2018)

Landrat of Ludwigslust-Parchim
- Incumbent
- Assumed office 27 October 2018
- Preceded by: Rolf Christiansen

Mayor of Grabow
- In office 24 February 2013 – 27 October 2018
- Preceded by: Ulrich Schult
- Succeeded by: Kathleen Bartels

Personal details
- Born: April 28, 1984 (age 42) Ludwigslust, East Germany
- Party: Social Democratic Party of Germany
- Website: stefan-sternberg.de

Stefan Sternberg (born 28 April 1984) is a German politician who has served as the Landrat of Ludwigslust-Parchim since 2018. A member of the Social Democratic Party of Germany (SPD) since 2012, Sternberg previously served as the mayor of Grabow between 2013 and 2018.

== Early life ==
Sternberg was born on 28 April 1984 in Ludwigslust and grew up in Grabow, where he spent his childhood and attended the Fritz Reuter Realschule. After school, he completed an apprenticeship.

== Political career ==
Sternberg is a member of the Social Democratic Party of Germany (SPD) since 2012. He has been the vice-chairman of the SPD in Mecklenburg-Vorpommern since 2018 and was the vice-chairman of the SPD in Ludwigslust-Parchim between 2016 and 2020.

He first started partaking in politics when he was elected as a member of the Grabow city council in 2002 through the SPD, despite not being a member. He then became a member of the district council of the newly formed Ludwigslust-Parchim in 2011.

On 24 February 2013, at the age of 29, he became the mayor of Grabow when Sternberg narrowly won against the independent candidate Matthias Wiedow who went to court over irregularities during the election. During his tenure, Sternberg conceptualized the controversial "Businesspark Eldetal" in the Grabow forest.

Endorsed by the incumbent Landrat of Ludwigslust-Parchim, Rolf Christiansen (SPD), Sternberg was elected as his successor on 27 September 2018 with 60.1% of the vote for a 7-year term. During this tenure, he was faced with the largest wildfire in Germany since the end of World War II and the COVID-19 pandemic. Due to his "good crisis management" he was chosen to be on the COVID-19 expert committee of the federal government. Sternberg was reelected in the first round of the Landrat election on 11 May 2025, winning 57.9% of the vote.

In February 2026, it was exposed that Sternberg had used tax payer funds to stay at a five-star hotel in Hamburg while visiting for a local congress in 2023, causing controversy. Sternberg defended the expenses as necessary and noted that they were filed legally. Sternberg has also been criticized for his choice of official car, choosing an expensive BMW hybrid over a more moderately priced electric. Due to these controversies, he has been called "the luxury-Landrat" by some outlets.

== Personal life ==
Sternberg is married and has two children. He continues to live in Grabow.
