= Sreter =

Sreter is a spelling without diacritics of the following surnames derived from German surname "Schröter":

- Sréter, Hungarian surname associated with the noble Sréter family, whose surnames were once spelled "Schrötter" and "Schretter".
  - István Sréter (1867–1942), Hungarian military officer and politician
- Šreter, Croatian surname
  - Ivan Šreter (1951–1991), Croatian physician
