= Schröter =

Schröter or Schroeter may refer to:

- Schröter (lunar crater), a crater on the Moon
- Schroeter (Martian crater), a crater on Mars
- Schröter (surname)

== See also ==
- Schroter's Valley (AKA Vallis Schröteri), a lunar feature named after Johann Hieronymus Schröter
