= Prieschka =

District of Bad Liebenwerda in Elbe-Elster, Brandenburg

- City of Bad Liebenwerda
- Location of Prieschka in Bad Liebenwerda
- Interactive map of Prieschka
- Location within Germany Location within Brandenburg
- Coordinates: 51°28′51″N 13°25′32″E
- Country: Germany
- State: Brandenburg
- City: Bad Liebenwerda
- Founded: 1993
- Elevation: 90 m (300 ft)

Population (2019-11-27)
  - Total: 305
- Time zone: UTC+01:00 (CET)
  - Summer (DST): UTC+02:00 (CEST)
- Postal codes: 04924
- Dialling codes: 035341

Prieschka is a district of the spa town of Bad Liebenwerda in Elbe-Elster in southern Brandenburg.

The present village of 300 inhabitants has its origins in a Slavic settlement located on an island surrounded by the waters of the Black Elster River in the central part of the village. The village was first mentioned in documents in 1325 as Prischka. It belonged to the Würdenhain estate, which was dissolved in 1442 by order of the Saxon Elector Frederick the Gentle.

Around 1520 a mill estate was built on the Black Elster River, from which in 1698 the Prieschka inheritance and free estate and the associated estate district emerged. In 1929, two brothers from Leipzig donated money to build a red brick bell tower in Dorfstraße in memory of their birthplace, Prieschka, which is now a listed building. In the course of the district reform in Brandenburg, the village was incorporated into Bad Liebenwerda on December 6, 1993.

The 80-hectare Alte Röder Nature Reserve near Prieschka, part of the Lower Lusatian Heath Nature Park, stretches northeast of the village and is used, among other things, for the preservation and development of the Elbe beaver, which was recorded there before World War II.

== Geography ==
=== Geography and natural environment ===
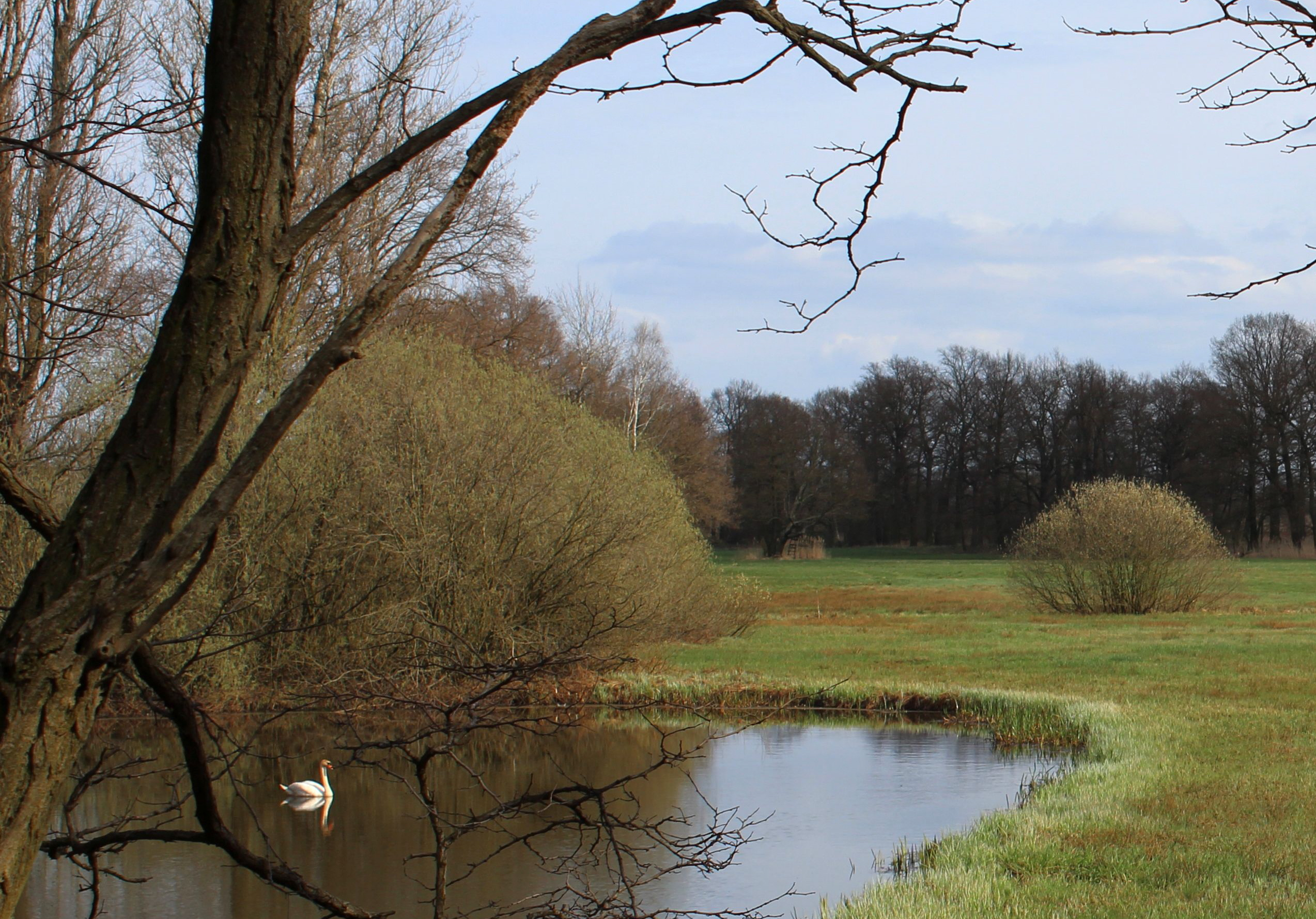
Alte Röder Nature Reserve

The village is located on the left side of the Breslau-Magdeburg glacial valley, where the Große Röder flows into the Black Elster, which reaches its narrowest point a few kilometers to the east in the seven-kilometer-wide Schraden lowlands between Elsterwerda and Merzdorf, and then swings to the northwest.

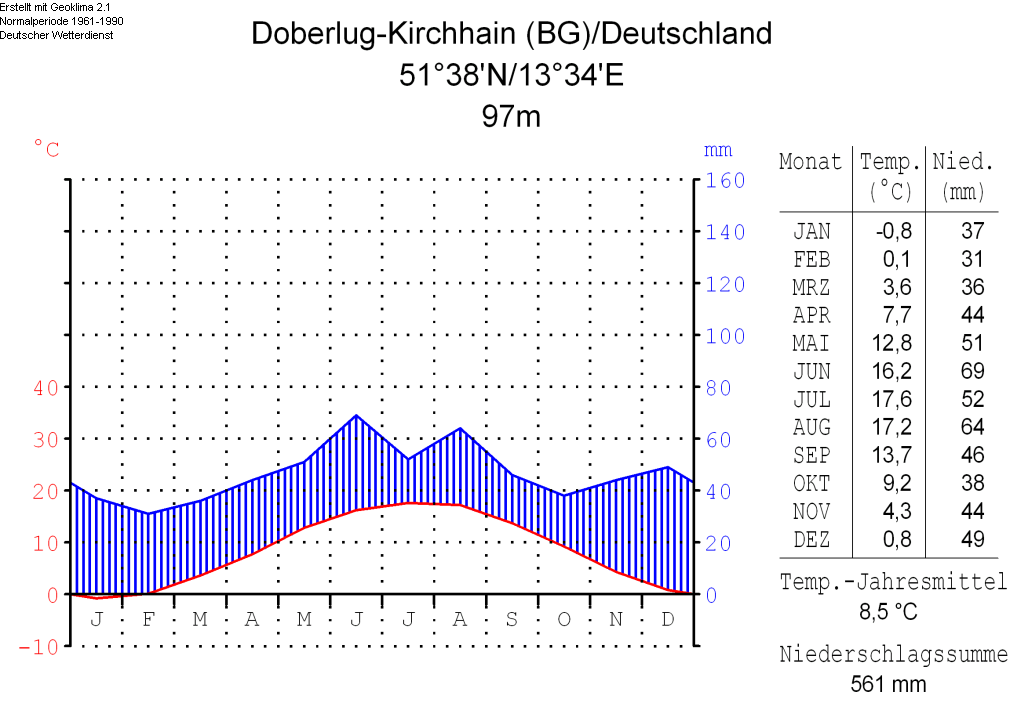
Climate diagram of Doberlug-Kirchhain about 20 km northeast of Prieschka

Prieschka is surrounded by the 6011-hectare Elsteraue landscape conservation area, which is divided into three ecological units, of which Elsteraue II includes Prieschka. One of the purposes of the protected landscape area is to preserve the area because of its special importance for natural recreation in the area of the spa town of Bad Liebenwerda, which is located about five kilometers north of the village.

As part of the 484 square kilometer Lower Lusatian Heath Nature Park, the approximately 80-hectare Alte Röder Nature Reserve near Prieschka extends northeast of the village. One of its conservation goals is to preserve and develop this area as a habitat for the Elbe beaver and other endangered species. Declared a nature reserve in 1981, the roeder lowland is home to one of the most enduring populations of the endangered Elbe beaver. The rare subspecies of the European beaver has been known to occur here since before World War II. In 2002, the total world population was 6,000 animals.

== Climate ==
With its humid climate, Prieschka lies in the cold temperate climate zone, although there is a noticeable transition to a Continental climate. The nearest weather stations are located in Doberlug-Kirchhain to the northeast, Torgau to the west, and Oschatz to the south.

The month with the lowest precipitation is February and the month with the highest precipitation is July. The average annual air temperature at the Doberlug-Kirchhain weather station, located about 20 kilometers to the northeast, is 8.5 °C. The difference between the coldest month, January, and the warmest month, July, is 18.4 °C.

== History ==
=== The place name and first documented mention ===
The village was first mentioned in a document in 1325 as Prischka. Other forms of the name were:

- 1408 Prischka
- 1443 Brissigk
- 1463 Brißk
- 1484 Prischk
- 1486 Brissig
- 1540 Brischk
- 1550 Prischka
- 1577 Brischkaw
- 1675 Prischke, Pritschke, Prißke

The name forms of 1325 and 1408 have come down to us through later transcriptions. They show writing habits from the 16th century. The most probable derivation of the place names is from Old Sorbian Brež(e)k (place on the shore), perhaps also Brežky or Upper Sorbian brjóh, Lower Sorbian brjog (edge, shore), Polish brzeg and Brezky (small birch trees, birch grove).

=== Early history ===
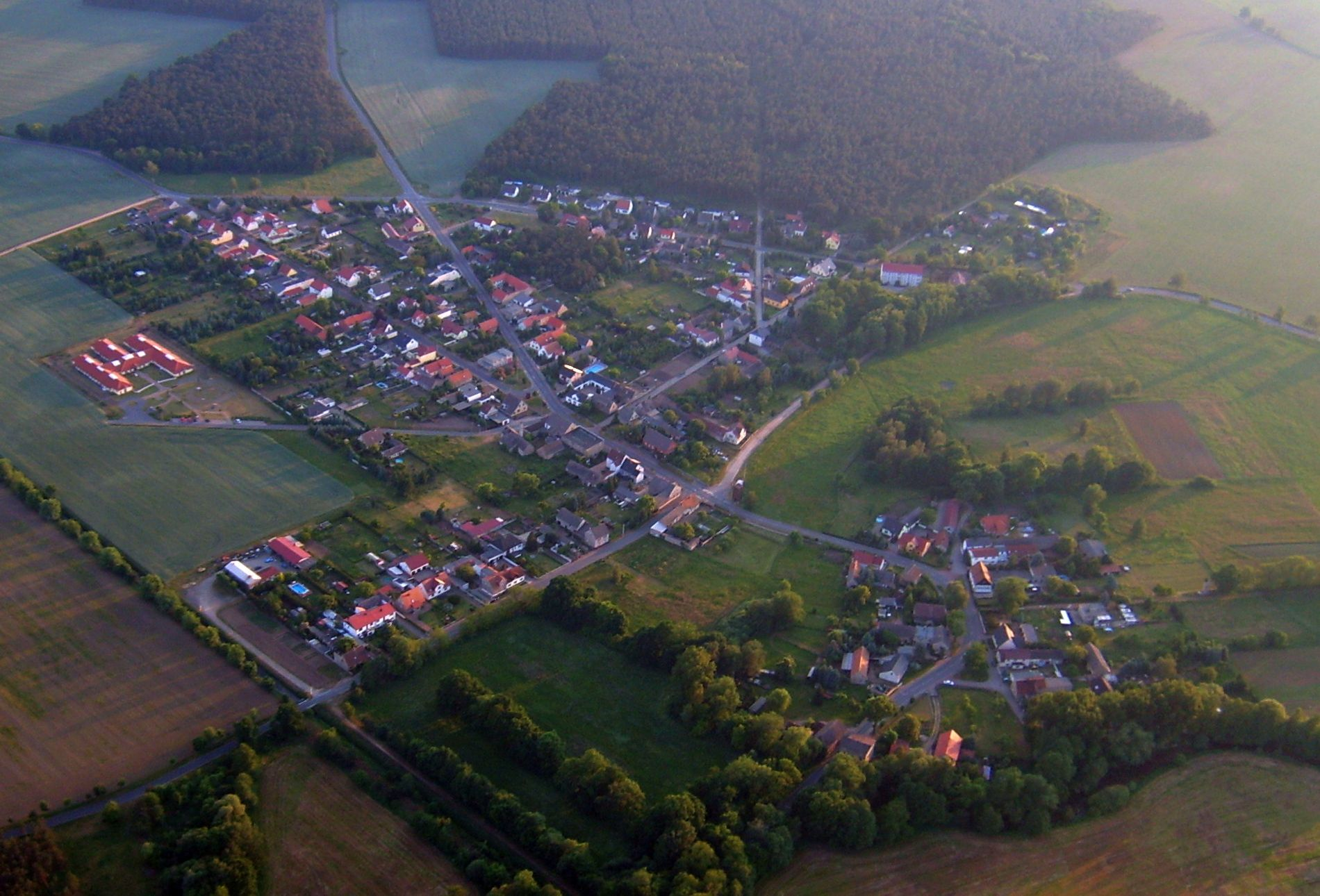
Prieschka

The oldest traces of human settlement in Prieschka date back to the Middle Stone Age. Traces of settlements from the later Bronze Age have also been found in the fields around the village. There is also a Germanic cemetery from the 3rd and 4th centuries, some of whose graves were properly excavated in 1907 and 1928. The cremation graves found in Prieschka are attributed to the Burgundian tribe. In addition to pottery, the finds include lance and arrowheads, axes, knives, swords, spurs, and bucket handles. Most of them have been donated to the Berlin State Museum, Halle State Museum of Prehistory, and the Bad Liebenwerda District Museum.

=== From the origins of the village to the Reformation ===
The village was founded as a Slavic settlement in the middle of the forest on an island surrounded by the waters of the Black Elster. The village had a typical horseshoe shape, also known as a Rundling.

Prieschka originally belonged to the manor of Würdenhain. The heart of the manor was the Eichwald, also known as Oppach, which covered about 1700 acres and was located east of Prieschka. At that time only Prieschka had a small open field for the Wendish settlement. In 1442, the lord of Würdenhain Castle, Hans Marschalk, was imprisoned for breach of the peace. Elector Frederick the Gentle confiscated his fief and slighted the Würdenhain Castle. The Würdenhain estate was transferred to the Mühlberg estate. In the following year the area came to the Bohemian nobleman Hinko Berka of Dubá through exchange and purchase transactions. Around 1484 Prieschka became the personal property of Agnes von Bircke (born von Schleinitz).

From 1520 Prieschka belonged to the Mühlberg office, to which the former Würdenhain dominion was attached and to which taxes and compulsory services had to be paid. In the same year, a mill estate was established there on the course of the Black Elster river, from which the Prieschka manor was later to emerge.

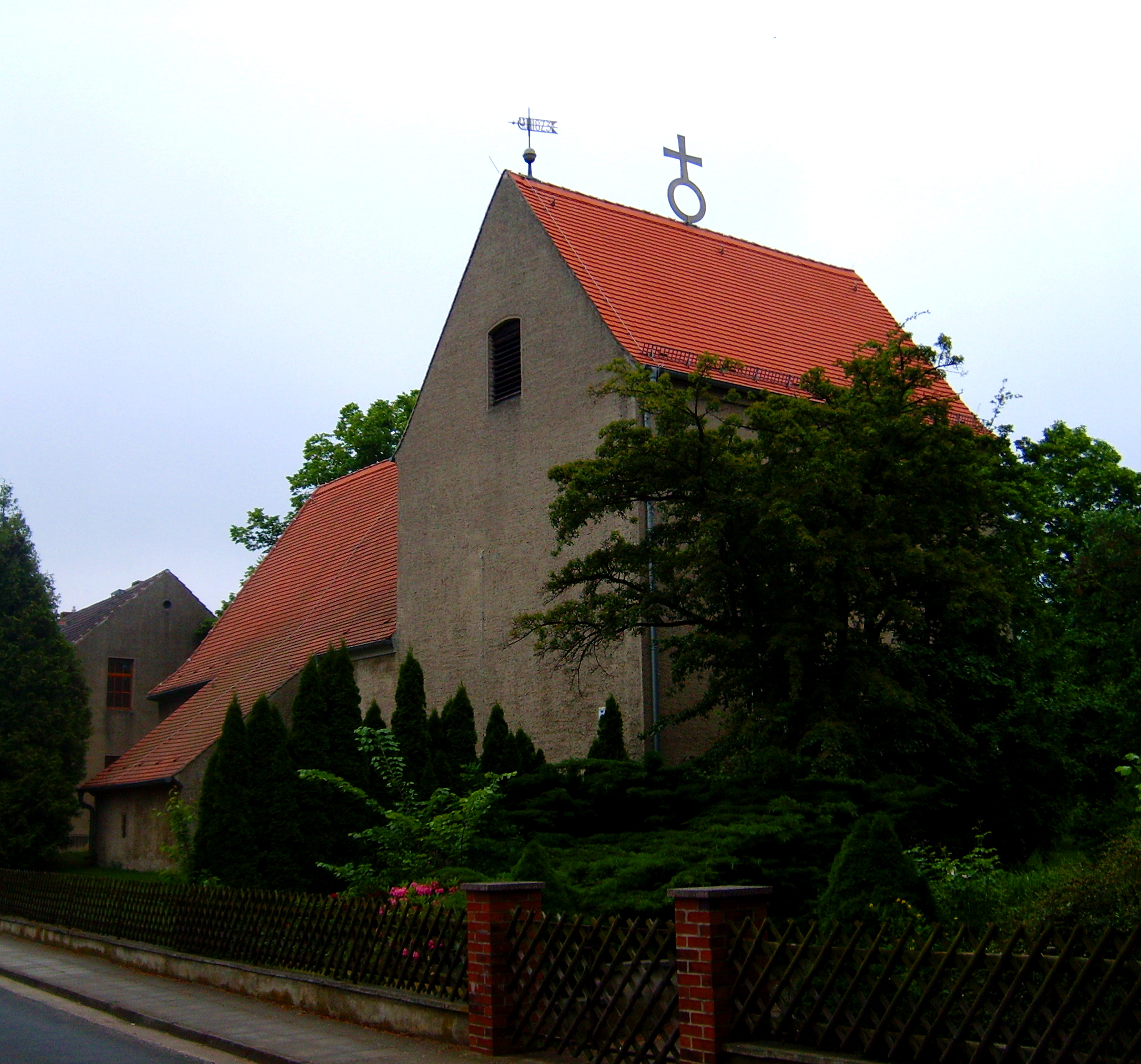
Village church in the neighboring Würdenhain

In 1550 it is documented that there were thirteen "possessed men" in Prieschka, where Sorbian was still spoken at that time. Fourteen years later the peasants from Prieschka, Würdenhain, Haida, and Reichenhain revolted against the bailiff Fuchs from Mühlberg. They set out their complaints in a document entitled "Die 10 Klageartikel der Dorfschaften Werdenhayn und Heide" and sent it to Dresden via the Amtmann. As they did not trust the official channels, they sent a second copy directly to the Elector "for his own hands". Among other things, they complained about the impairment of fishing and forestry rights as well as reduced wages for the construction of the castle in Mühlberg. Since the peasants' actions were considered dangerous and punishable, Dresden first ordered an investigation of the "deer leader''. Hans Bräunig, the Kretzschmann (innkeeper) from Würdenhain, the spokesman for the peasants, was initially arrested. He and several other farmers involved were later fined.

The inhabitants of the village were parishioners of Würdenhain. They adopted the Protestant faith during the Reformation in 1541. However, the Catholic priest Thomas Bantzer, who was born on the Prieschka mill estate, refused to accept the Lutheran faith, built a cottage on the Würdenhain parish estate, and renounced his office. The first Lutheran pastor was ordained in Würdenhain on Ascension Day in 1541. However, the simple population did not give up the old customs and traditions easily, and in 1578 it was reported from the parish: "In Prieschka and Oschätzchen praise dances are held, with all kinds of frivolity, with twisting and other things.

=== From the Thirty Years' War to the Coalition Wars ===
In 1618, after the defenestration of Prague, the Thirty Years' War broke out. It brought much misery and plundering by passing troops to the whole region. The plague also took its toll during this time. When this highly contagious infectious disease broke out in Prieschka in 1626, twenty people died in the village, about half of the population. In January 1637, the troops of the Swedish general Johan Banér moved into their winter quarters in Torgau until early

summer. They roamed the neighboring Elbe-Elster region, plundering villages and setting them on fire. When the troops entered Prieschka, about twenty people were killed, and four farms were destroyed.

In 1692 the Prieschka mill estate came into the possession of the Commanding Officer Andreas Gottfried von Kirchbach by inheritance. At the same time, he acquired all the lands of the farms orphaned by the Thirty Years' War. In 1698, he was granted the superior and hereditary courts, as well as the right to write, and the hereditary and free manor with the associated manor district was created. In 1724, von Kirchbach bequeathed the estate to his cousin Hans Karl von Kirchbach. In 1766 it passed into the possession of Heinrich Rudolf Vitzthum von Eckstädt, who held it until 1800.

Prieschka manor owners
Year	Owner
1698–1724:	Andreas Gottfried von Kirchbach
1724–1766:	Hans Karl von Kirchbach
1766–1800:	Heinrich Rudolf Vitzthum von Eckstädt
1800–1815:	Kadner
1815–1854:	Johann August Fischer
1854–1892:	Rudolf von Fischer
1892–1909:	German Private Civil Servants Association
1909–1926:	Georg Steblein, or rather his widow
1926:	Otto Klaue
1942–1942:	Herrmann Göbel
1943–1945:	The people
other names:	Bauer, Ibert, Jens, Kran, Fritz Dotti

At that time, the Coalition Wars following the French Revolution were in full swing and did not leave Prieschka unscathed. The region suffered from huge troop movements, especially in the run-up to the Battle of Leipzig in the fall of 1813. At the end of September, the corps of Generals Dobschütz and Tauentzien, with 30,000 men, took up quarters in Liebenwerda for ten days. From September 28 to 30, 1813, the corps of Gebhard Leberecht von Blücher, also with 30,000 men, camped in nearby Elsterwerda. Between 1806 and 1807 the inhabitants of Prieschka had to accommodate French troops several times. According to the legend, a French horseman got stuck in the mud and sank on the broad meadows, a piece of land between Prieschka and Würdenhain on the Black Elster.

=== From the Congress of Vienna to the dissolution of the Prieschka manor district ===
After the provisions of the Congress of Vienna in 1815, Prieschka finally passed from the Kingdom of Saxony to the administrative district of Merseburg in the Prussian Province of Saxony, and in 1816 the district of Liebenwerda was created, which absorbed a large part of the Mühlberg office, the Liebenwerda office, and parts of the Großenhain office.

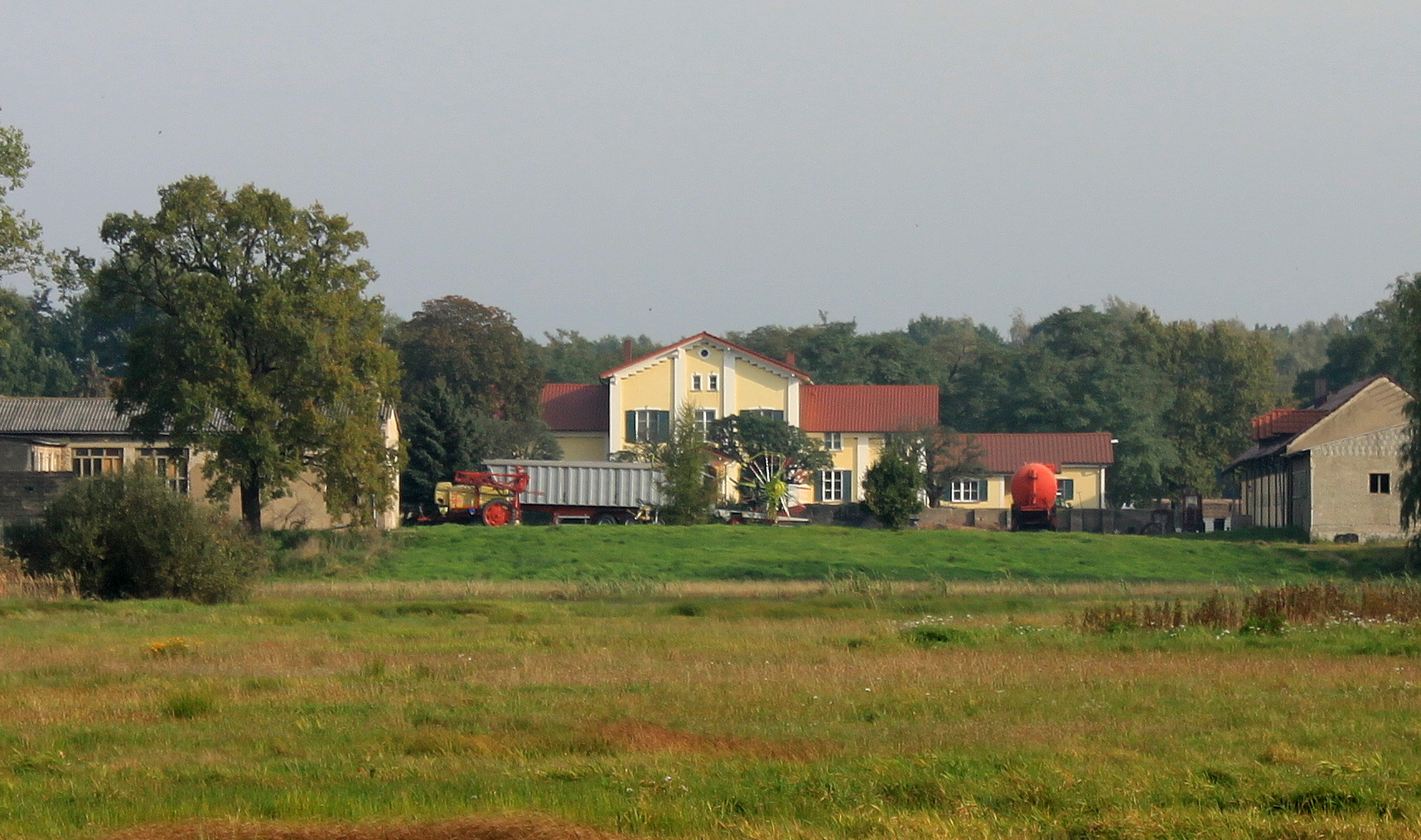
The Prieschka Manor

In 1833, Oppach, now almost completely deforested, was surveyed for separation. The rights of the neighboring villages (except Saathain) to use this area for purposes such as hunting, grazing, fishing, and the extraction of wood, clay, sand, or gravel were settled by the transfer of large areas. This also created new village boundaries, some of which were dead straight. As a result of the division of the forest districts, the Prieschka estate acquired the Oppach and Kliebing estates. This increased its size considerably. The forest areas extended to the villages of Würdenhain, Saathain, and Reichenhain and bordered the villages of Oschätzchen and Zobersdorf. Prieschka alone received 276 morgen, 59 of which were the manor. At that time the forest was cut down and the land was reclaimed for fields and meadows. Shortly after, in 1849, the manor was abolished and in 1852, the first construction works for the regulation of the Black Elster began near the neighboring village of Zeischa, after the Prussian provincial government had tried to develop plans for this project since 1817. The river, which until then had consisted of numerous streams, was given its present bed and dammed in 1861. The Große Röder, which previously flowed into the Würdenhain, was diverted into the old Elster bed (Alte Röder) and flowed into the new course of the Schwarze Elster about six hundred meters northeast of the village of Prieschka at Gänsewinkel until the First World War.

At the same time, the industrialization of the region around Prieschka began in the second half of the 19th century. The village itself, where agriculture remained the main source of income, was only indirectly affected by this development. The village was located far from important railroads and roads. Fishing in the Röder and Schwarze Elster rivers had become largely impossible due to the increasing pollution from newly established industrial plants, such as the pulp mill in Gröditz. The inhabitants of Prieschka found work in the surrounding villages, which became bigger and more conveniently located. In 1863 the landowner and Prussian officer Lieutenant Rudolf Fischer had the whole estate rebuilt. He settled with the estate, which included about 700 acres of land, about 500 meters north of Prieschka village and had a new manor house built there in 1868. He demolished most of the old buildings on the Röder.

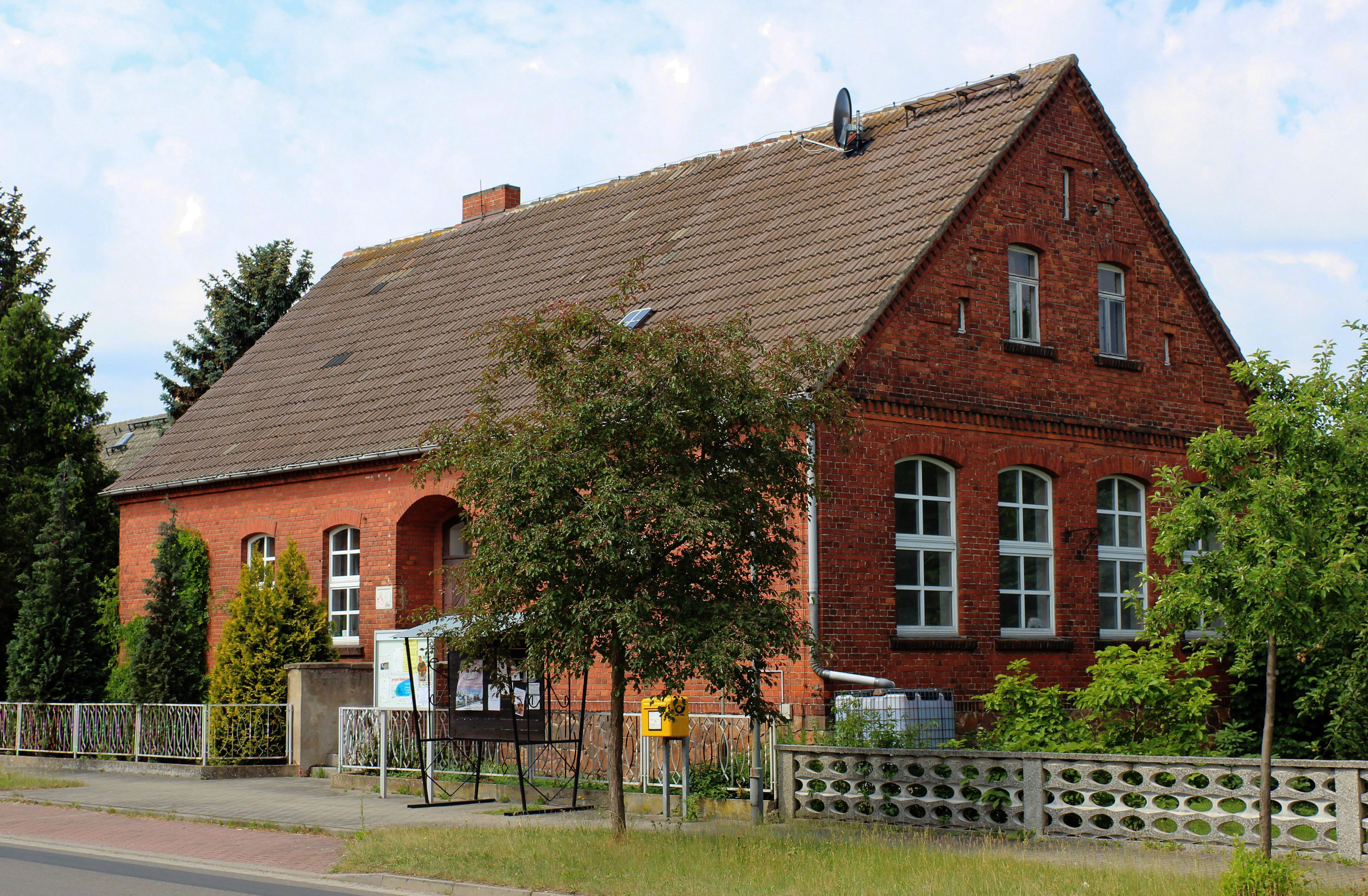
Prieschka village school built in 1902

The children of Prieschka attended the village school in Würdenhain until the end of the 19th century. The structures from the late Middle Ages had survived partly due to the still-existing parish boundaries. In 1898 the children of the village were sent to the school in Würdenhain. In the beginning, the old manor house at the mill, acquired by the village, was used as a school building. Four years later the Prieschka School was built. On August 17, 1902, the school was inaugurated with a children's party. A report about it appeared in the Liebenwerdaer Kreisblatt.,

In 1909, three hundred morgen of the seven hundred acre estate were subdivided and sold to the German Private Civil Servants Association. The remaining four hundred acres were purchased by the previous estate inspector, Georg Steblein (1855–1909), who died in February of that year. After his death, it was inherited by his wife. In 1926 the estate became the property of Otto Klaue. Soon after, in 1928, the Prieschka estate was dissolved. From then on, all the affairs of the village were taken over by the head of the village.

During the First World War, the mouth of the Große Röder was moved back to Würdenhain as part of its regulation by the Röder regulatory cooperative Saathain. Since the Alte Röder now lacked flow velocity, the Prieschka mill owner received compensation of 30,000 marks from the government district. An oil engine was installed to run the mill in Prieschka. The mill was also modernized.

=== From World War II to the present ===
When the Red Army reached the village at the end of the Second World War on April 22, 1945, nine residents and seven soldiers were shot dead.

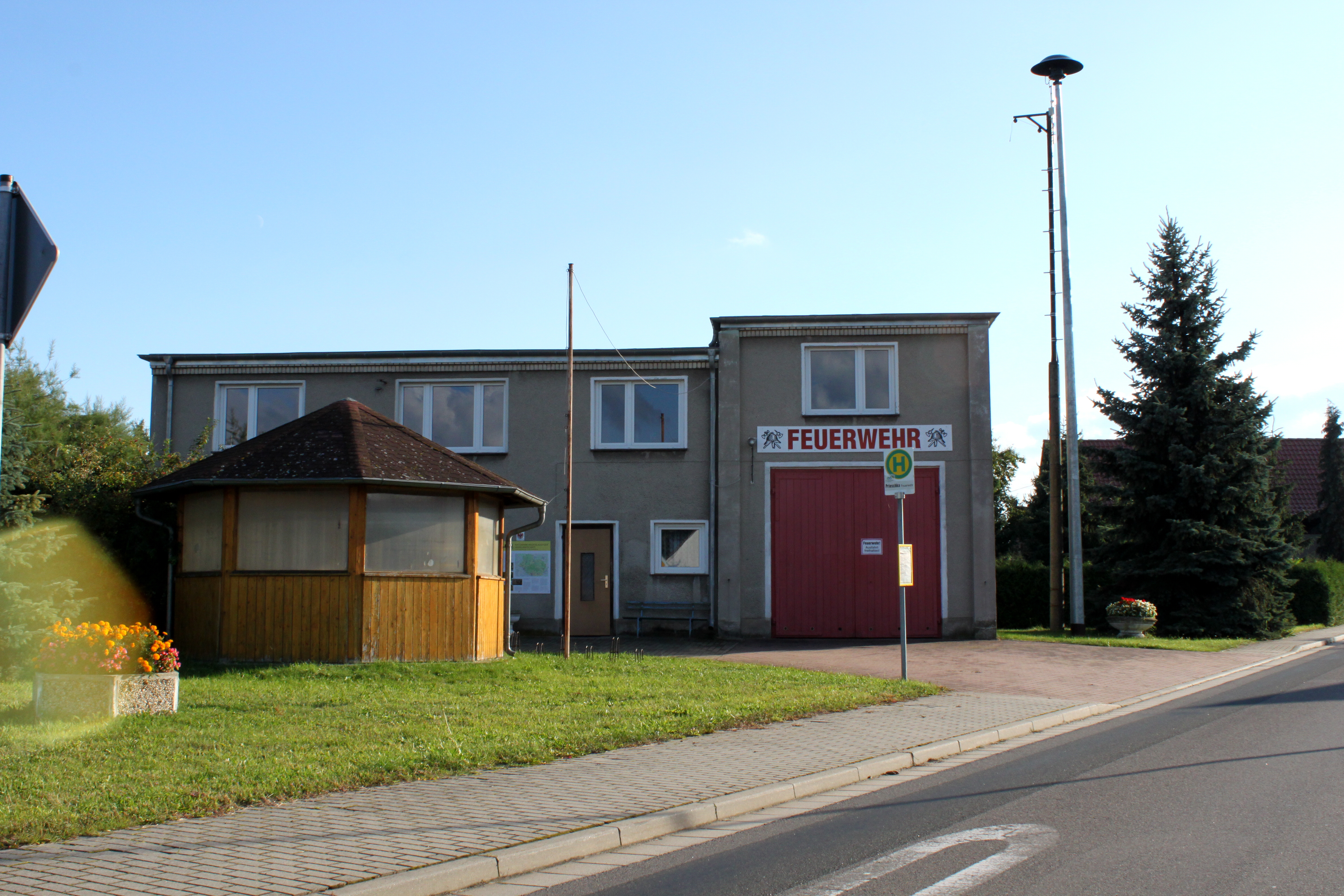
Fire station of the volunteer fire department in Prieschka

In the fall of 1945, the Land Reform began in the district of Bad Liebenwerda. The Land Reform Ordinance (BRVO) provided for the expropriation and division of large private and state-owned estates of more than 100 hectares, including all buildings, living and dead stock, and other agricultural assets. According to the minutes of the district administration of October 11, 1945, the district first divided the 116 hectares of land in Prieschka over the objection of Fritz Dotti, the owner of the manor, because of the relatively small excess of the set limit. By March 1 of the following year, a total of 9580 hectares had been expropriated and distributed in the district.

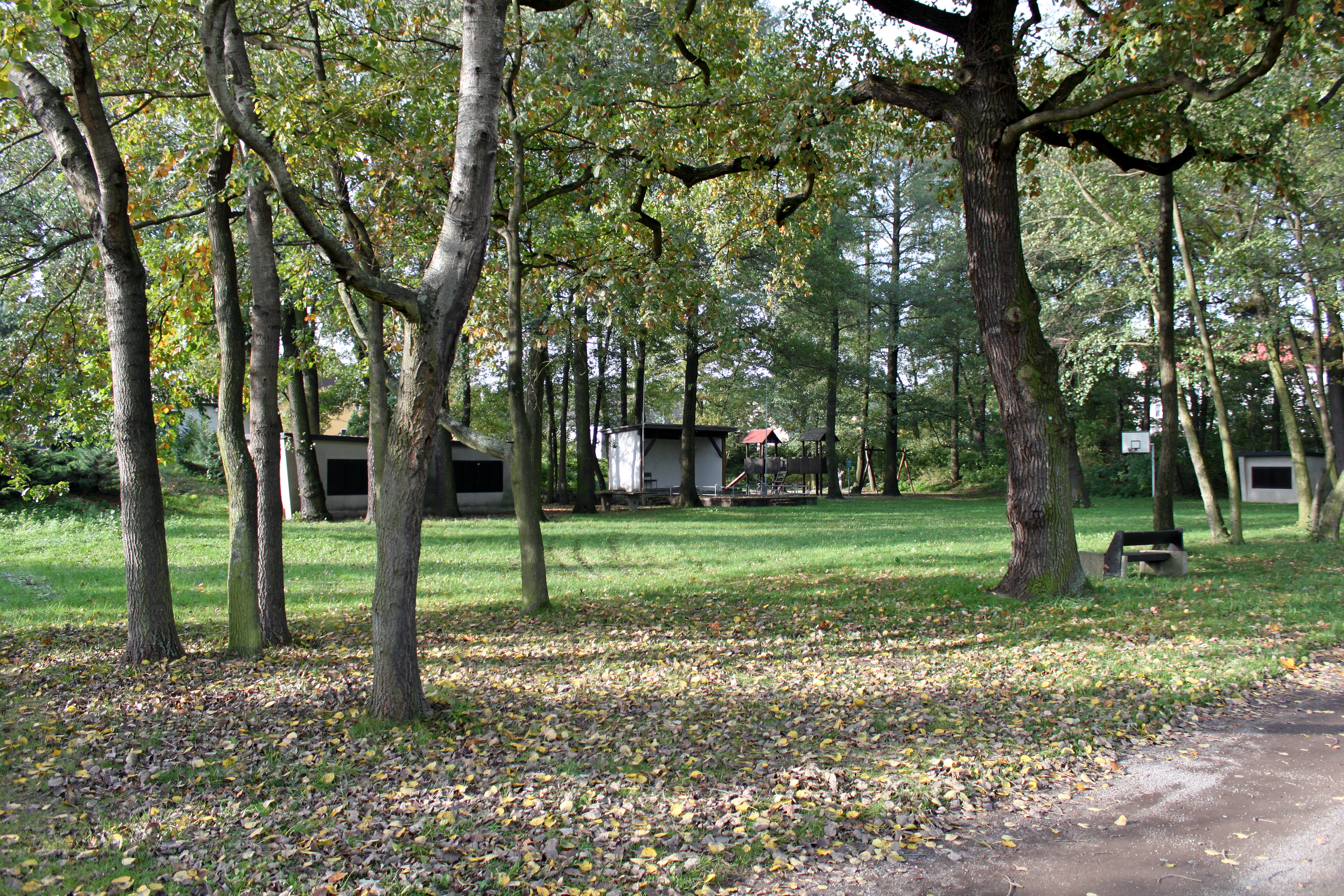
Prieschka sports and playground with an open-air stage

In the German Democratic Republic, founded in October 1949, Prieschka first belonged to the state of Saxony-Anhalt, which was dissolved in 1952. After the formation of districts, the village belonged to the district of Cottbus until the reunification of the two German states in 1990.

In 1961, the Elstergrund LP was established in Prieschka, which was transformed into a Volkseigenes Gut in 1964. The infrastructure of the village was also improved. Between 1965 and 1966 a fire station was built and a year later a consumer outlet was opened. Shortly before the Peaceful Revolution, the construction of a central drinking water supply began in Prieschka, followed by the development of roads and a new sewerage system in 1993.

Prieschka belonged to the district of Bad Liebenwerda until the district reform in Brandenburg in 1993, which merged with the districts of Herzberg and Finsterwalde into the district of Elbe-Elster on December 6, 1993. On the same day, the municipality was incorporated into the town of Bad Liebenwerda together with the villages of Dobra, Kosilenzien, Kröbeln, Lausitz, Maasdorf, Möglenz, Neuburxdorf, Oschätzchen, Thalberg, Theisa, Zeischa and Zobersdorf.

=== Population development ===
In 1835 the village had 33 houses with 177 inhabitants. There were 31 horses, 238 cattle, 8 goats, and 65 pigs. After the Second World War, due to the influx of displaced persons, the population of Prieschka increased to 533 in 1946 and reached its peak. In 2016 the number of inhabitants decreased to 286.

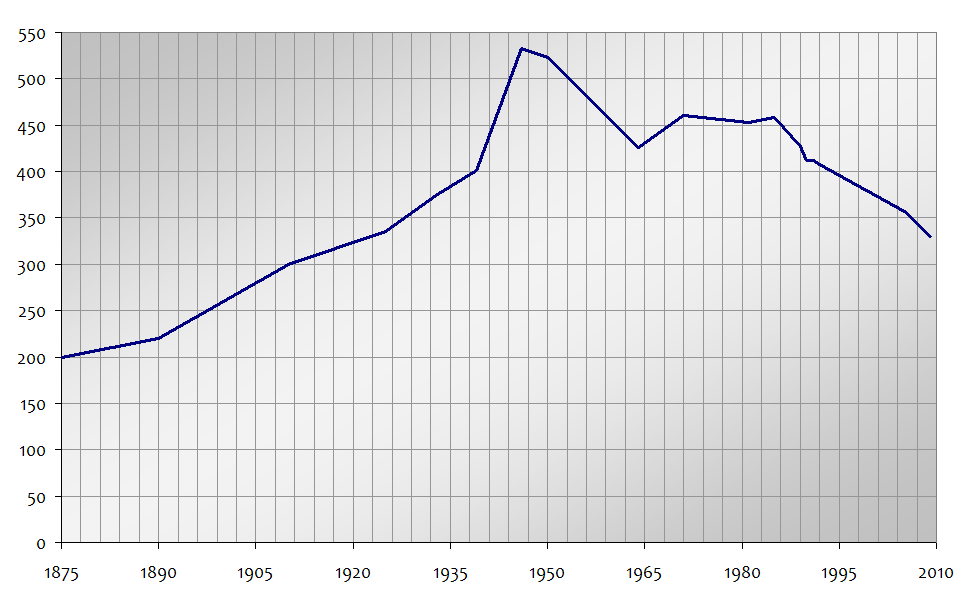
Population development of Prieschka since 1875

Population development of Prieschka since 1875

Year	Population
1875	200
1890	220
1910	300
1925	335
1933	375

Year	Population
1939	401
1946	533
1950	523
1964	426
1971	461

Year	Population
1981	453
1985	458
1989	427
1990	412
1991	412

Year	Population
1992	408
2005	357
2009	330
2016	286
2019	305

== Politics ==
=== District representation ===
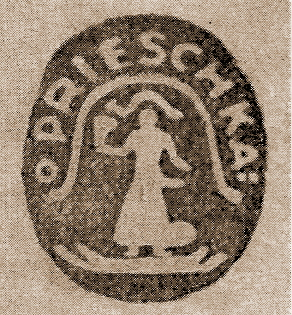
Old village seal of Prieschka

Since 1993, when the village was incorporated into Bad Liebenwerda, Prieschka has been a district of the spa town. According to the main statute of the town, Prieschka is represented by the head of the village and a local advisory council.

Sandro Lindner is currently the head of the local council, Björn Küster and Janin Weser are the local councillors.

=== Coat of arms and seal ===
The present district of Prieschka does not have its own coat of arms. However, an old village seal has been preserved from Prieschka, which, like most of the few known village seals in the old district of Bad Liebenwerda, probably dates from the first half of the 19th century. In the center of the seal is a figure that can be interpreted as a female figure or a sower holding an object in her right hand. There is a cloud above her head. The inscription around the high oval seal contains the place name Prieschka.

== Culture and attractions ==
=== Recreation and tourism ===
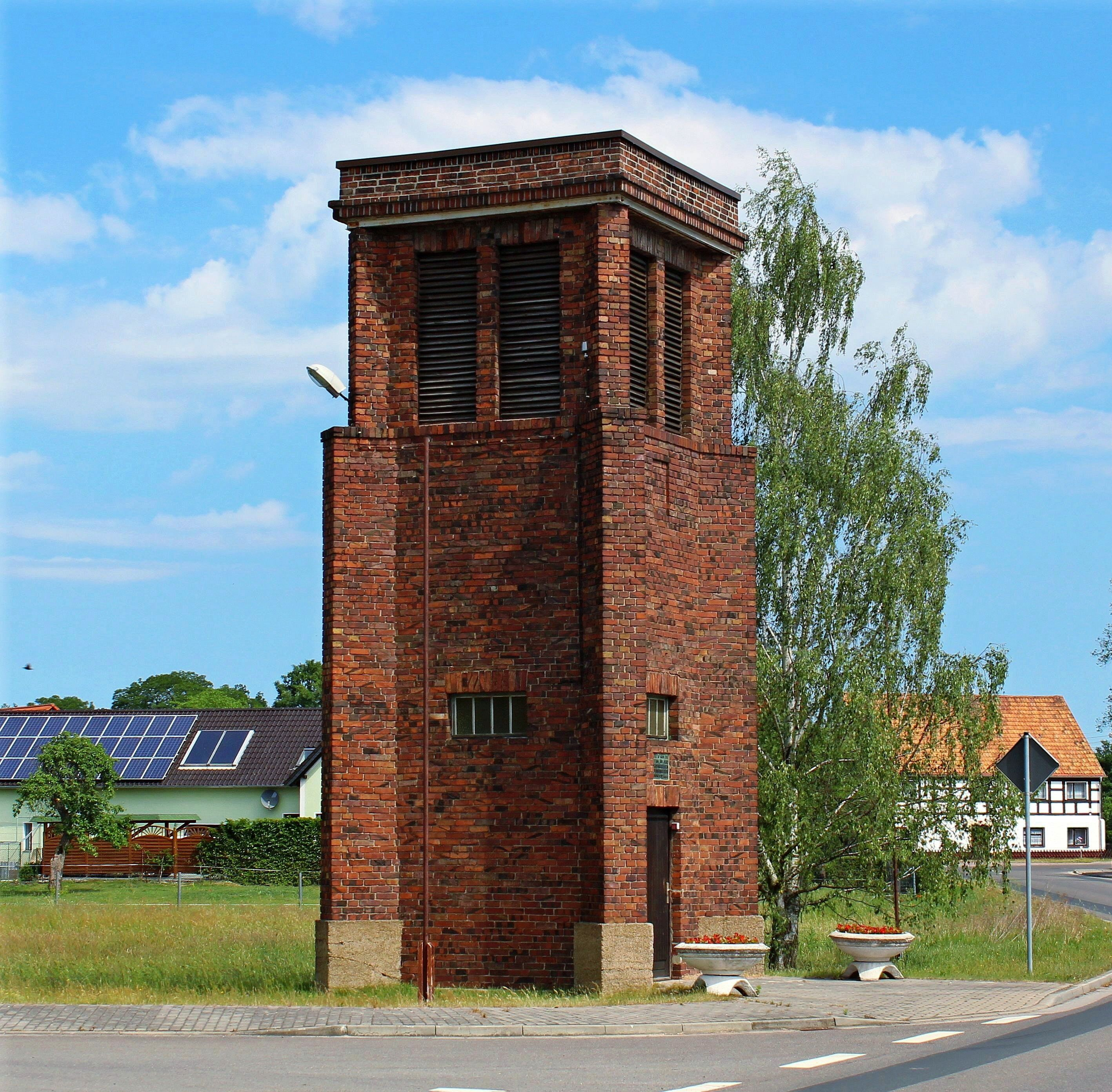
Bell tower

Several paved bike paths along the Black Elster River connect Prieschka with the sights of the surrounding area and the Lower Lusatian Heath Nature Park. The Brandenburg Tour, Germany's longest long-distance bike route at 1111 kilometers, passes through the village. Other bicycle routes include the Fürst-Pückler Cycle Route, which was included in the project list of the Fürst-Pückler state International Building Exhibition under the motto "500 kilometers through time," and the 108-kilometer Black Elster Cycle Route. On the bridge over the river Elster at 64.5 km there is a jetty for the newly developing water tourism. About three kilometers northeast of Prieschka is the Zeischa natural swimming lake, where there is also a campground with 137 pitches and bungalows for rent.

Annual highlights in the village include the spring festival at the pro civitate Residence for the disabled, the maypole raising, and the children's and village festival. Active clubs include the Prieschka Fire Department Association and the local youth club.

=== Buildings ===
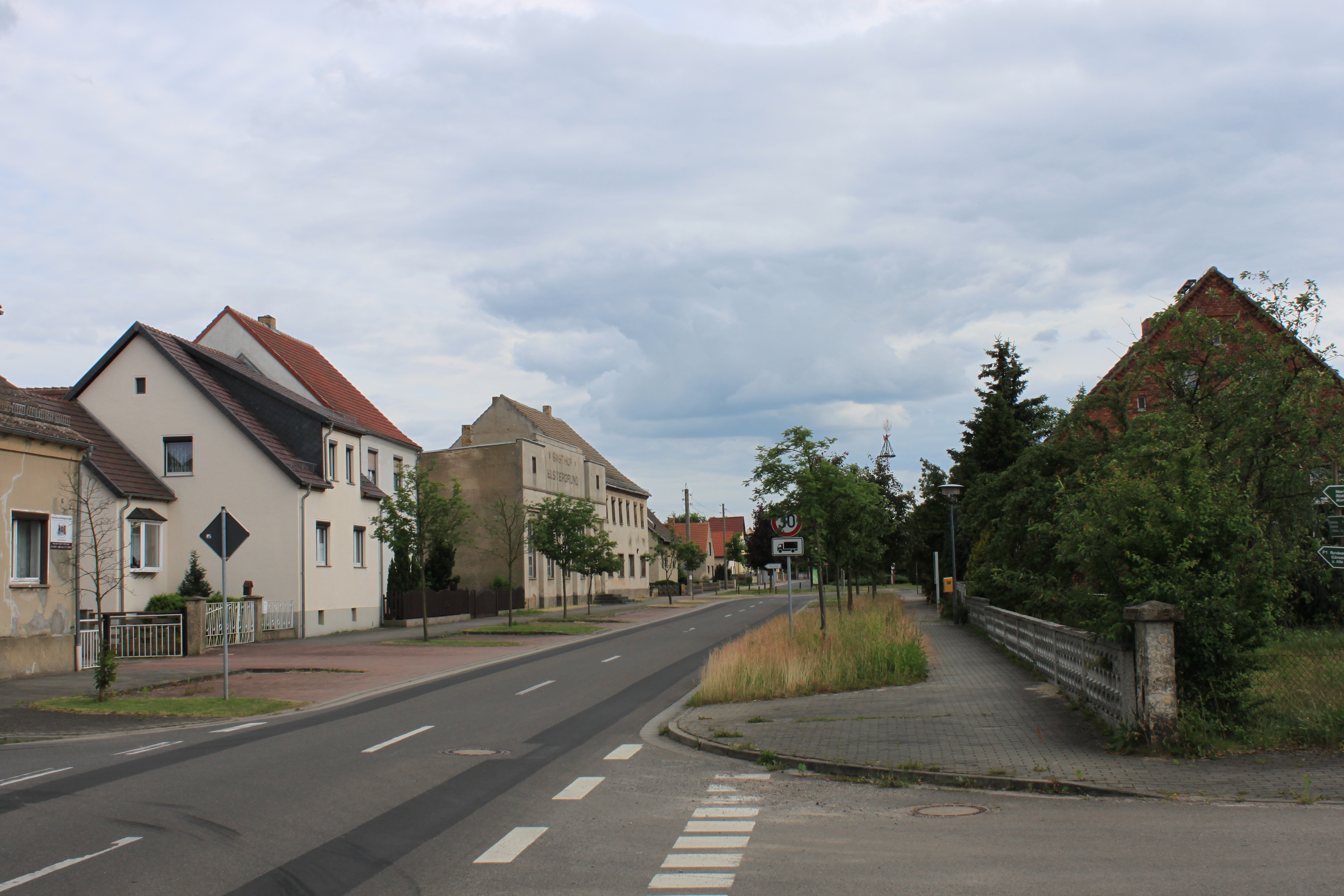
Dorfstraße with the building of the former inn "Zum Elstergrund"

Two buildings in Prieschka are listed as historical monuments in the Elbe-Elster district: a half-timbered house built in 1827 at 62 Dorfstraße and the Prieschka bell tower at the intersection of Würdenhainer Straße and Dorfstraße, which was donated in 1929 by the brothers Georg and Julius Müller from Leipzig, who were born in Prieschka. They donated 5,000 marks for the purchase of two bells and were made honorary citizens of the village.

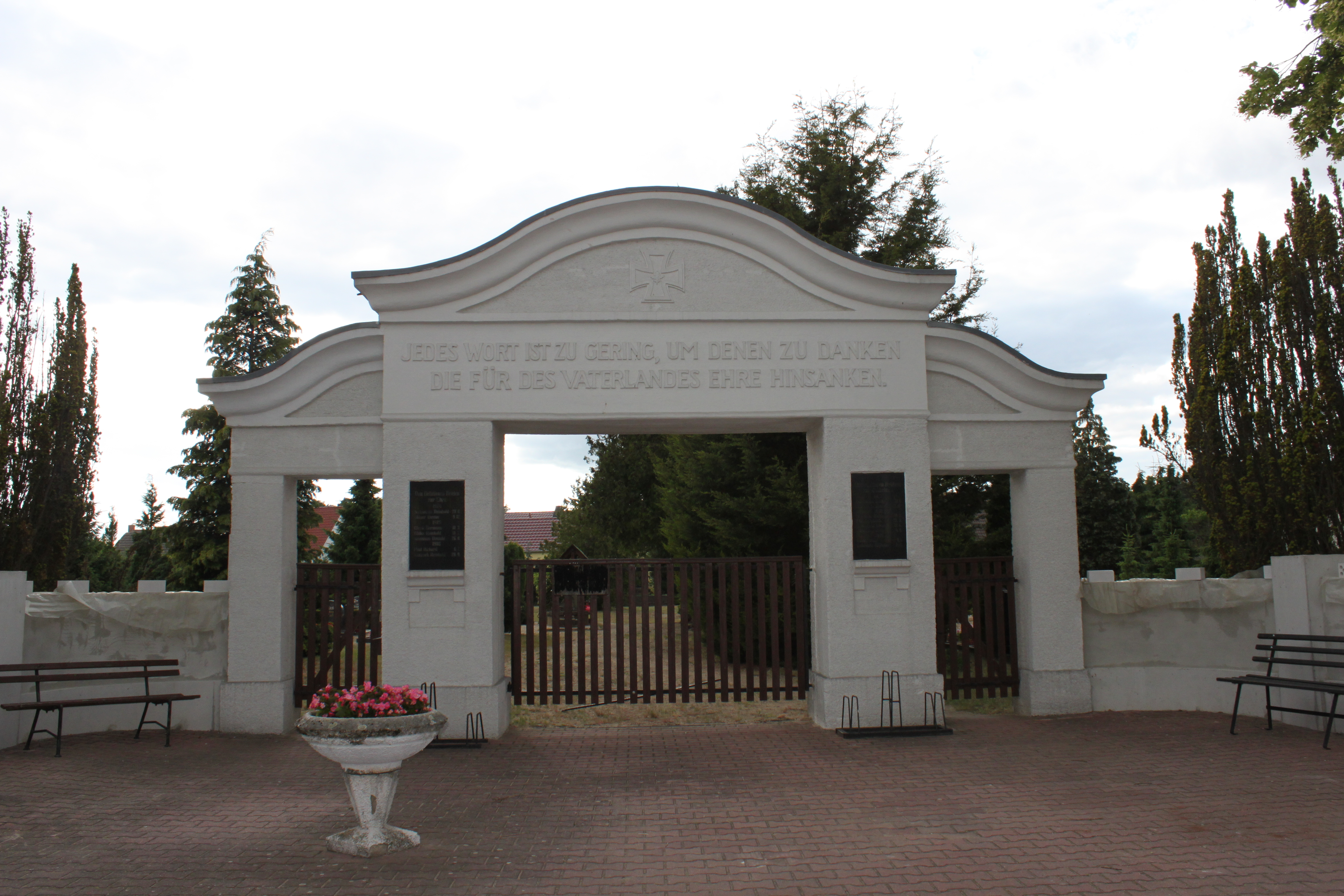
Entrance gate of the cemetery

The Prieschka Mill, located at the end of the village in the direction of Zeischa, has a long history. As early as the beginning of the 16th century, there was a mill on this site along the course of the Black Elster River, which originally belonged to the noble family von Schleinitz from Meissen. After being converted to produce compound feed for cattle and pigs during the GDR era, the mill has been dormant since its reprivatization shortly after the Peaceful Revolution. It was finally torn down in 2013.

Another building that characterized the townscape of Prieschka was the former Zum Elstergrund inn, which stood opposite the red brick building of the former Prieschka school, built in 1902. In 1768, the farmer Funke built an inn called Zum goldenen Hirsch on the same site. In 1839 the inn and other buildings on the estate burned down completely, and in 1841 a new building was erected and the inn was given its present name. In 1929, a flat building was added to the left side of the pub. From 1967 the pub was owned by the Consumers' co-operative, which also opened a shop there. The pub was closed after the reunification and the unused building was demolished in 2022.

The entrance portal of the Prieschka cemetery in Reichenhainer Street was designed in the form of a hero's gate. In the columns of the war memorial, which was inaugurated on June 7, 1925, there are plaques with fifteen names of villagers who died in the First World War. To commemorate those who died or went missing in the Second World War, there are plaques with a total of fifty names on the left and right of the entrance to the Memorial Hall.

== Economy and infrastructure ==
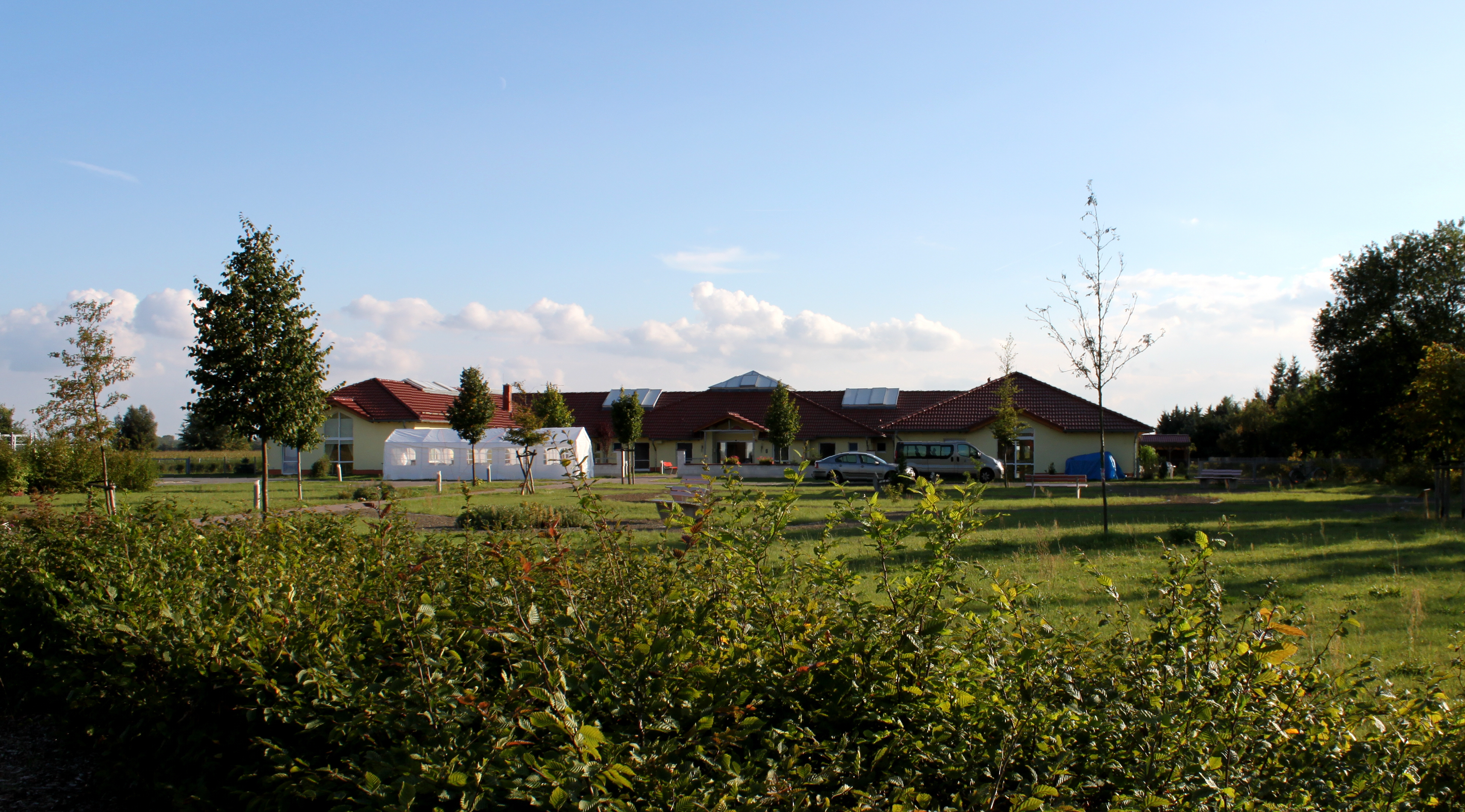
Residential and nursing home "Haus Prieschka"

Prieschka is home to a number of medium-sized companies, such as Bötig stonemasonry, Schmidt electrical installation and Osterhuber Agrar GmbH, which has been farming the Prieschka estate since 1991. Since 2004, Haus Prieschka has been home to the pro civitate group of companies, a handicapped-accessible residential and care facility for forty people. There is a veterinary practice for large and small animals in the village. The industrial estates closest to the village are in Haida, Bad Liebenwerda and Elsterwerda.

In the village, the Landesstraße 593 branches off from the Landesstraße 59 in the direction of Waldbad Zeischa and the Bundesstraße 101. The nearest railway stations are Elsterwerda-Biehla station and Bad Liebenwerda on the Węgliniec–Roßlau railway and Elsterwerda station on the Berlin-Dresden and Riesa-Elsterwerda lines.

The regional daily newspaper Lausitzer Rundschau is published in Prieschka. It is published in the Elbe-Elster district as Elbe-Elster-Rundschau and has a total circulation of about 99,000 copies. The free advertising newspapers Wochenkurier and SonntagsWochenBlatt are published weekly. The town of Bad Liebenwerda publishes a monthly newspaper, Der Stadtschreiber, and the Elbe-Elster Kreisanzeiger is published as needed. In addition, the local newspaper Der Hammer in Prieschka has been published six times a year since 2016, informing residents about news and events in the village. The newspaper was created with the background that it was once a tradition in the village to distribute information and notices from household to household on a wooden board that was passed from house to house and called the Hammer.

== Education ==
Children from the district currently attend school in Bad Liebenwerda. The Robert Reiss Primary School Center with the status of a day school was created in August 2006 through the merger of the elementary schools in Bad Liebenwerda, Neuburxdorf and Zobersdorf, where the children from Prieschka were also enrolled.

There is also a high school in Bad Liebenwerda. A special school with a focus on mental development is located in the neighboring district of Oschätzchen. The Elbe-Elster adult education center offers courses and other continuing education opportunities at its regional office in Bad Liebenwerda. The Gebrüder Graun district music school has a branch in the town. There is also a public library which, in addition to the usual lending services, offers guided library tours, literary events and readings by authors, and currently has about 20,300 items.

A gymnasium and other educational institutions are located in the town of Elsterwerda, around ten kilometers east of Prieschka.

== Personalities ==
The electoral Saxon chapel master and composer Friedrich Christoph Gestewitz was born in Prieschka on November 3, 1753. He died in Dresden on August 1, 1805.

== Bibliography ==
- Rene Lindner: Ortsteil Prieschka in Chronik der Stadt Liebenwerda. Bad Liebenwerda Town Marketing and Business Association Winklerdruck GmbH Gräfenhainichen, Bad Liebenwerda 2007, ISBN 3-7245-1420-4, p. 266/267.
- Matthäus Karl Fitzkow: Zur älteren Geschichte der Stadt Liebenwerda und ihres Kreisgebietes. Published by the Bad Liebenwerda District Museum. Bad Liebenwerda 1961.
- Rudolf Matthies: Chronik des Dorfes Würdenhain.
- Matthias Donath: Schlösser zwischen Elbe und Elster. Meißen 2007, p. 85.
