= Alte Röder Nature Reserve =

Nature reserve in Brandenburg, Germany

Coordinates: 51°29′00″N 13°26′00″E

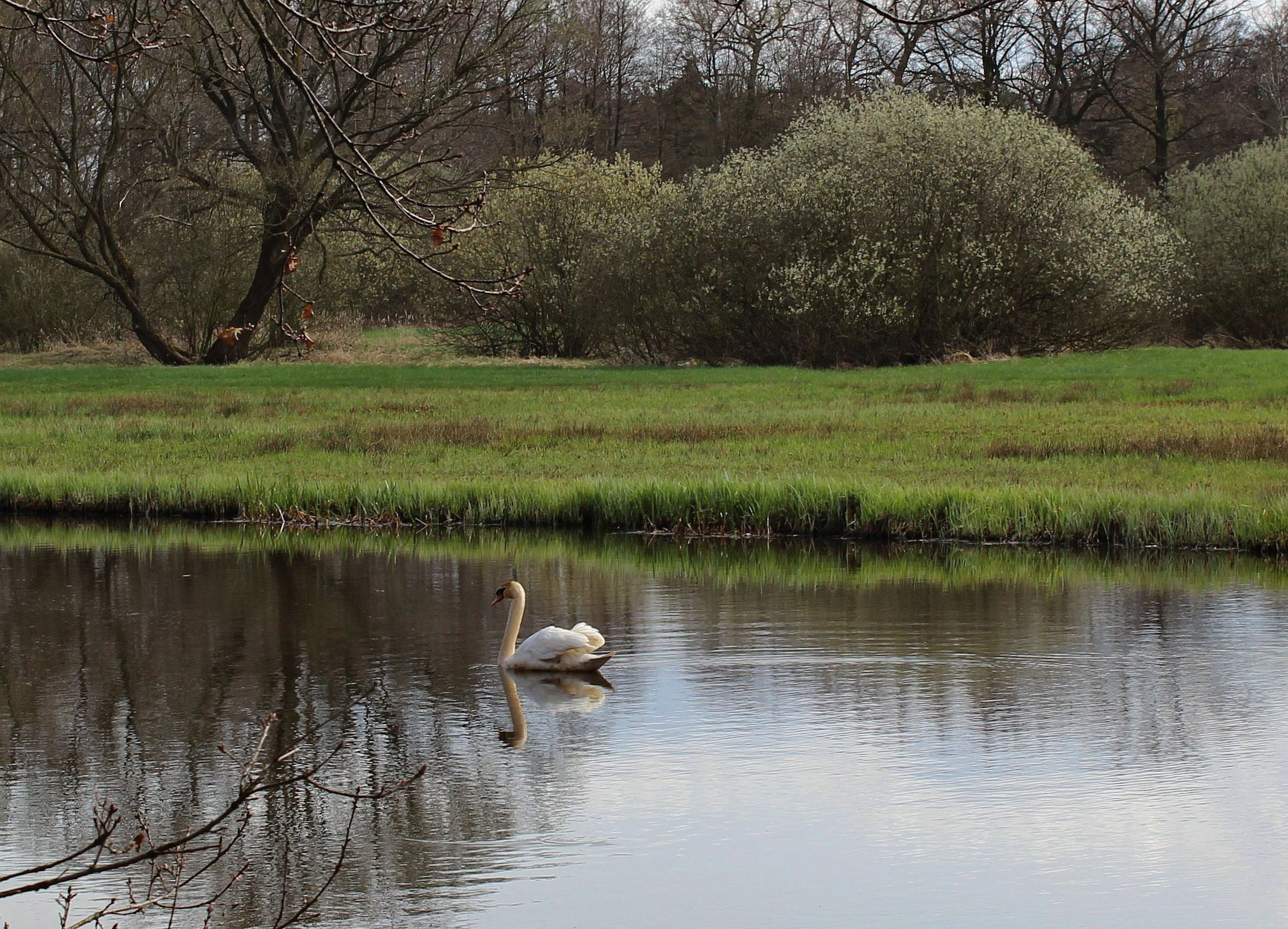
Alte Röder Nature Reserve

The Alte Röder Nature Reserve (German: Naturschutzgebiet Alte Röder bei Prieschka) lies on the left bank of the Black Elster river between the village of Prieschka in the municipality of Bad Liebenwerda and the village of Würdenhain which belongs to Röderland. It is located within the Lower Lusatian Heath Nature Park (Naturpark Niederlausitzer Heidelandschaft), which covers an area of 484 km². The lowland valley of the Röder stream has been protected since 1981 and contains one of the most settled colonies of the Elbe Beaver, a species of beaver threatened by extinction. One of its main conservation aims is the preservation and development of this area as a habitat for the Elbe Beaver and other endangered species.

The roughly 80-hectare nature reserve extends along the river course of the Alte Röder ("Old Röder") which was originally an old riverbed of the Black Elster between Würdenhain and Prieschka and, during the period of Elster Regulation (1852 to 1864) to the First World War was used to channel the Große Röder river. The area of the old confluence of the Alte Röder with the Black Elster is known as the Gänsewinkel ("Goose Corner"). It is located northeast of Prieschka in the immediate vicinity of the point where the Landesstraße 593 crosses the Black Elster.
