= Heinrich von Schroeter =

German police chief

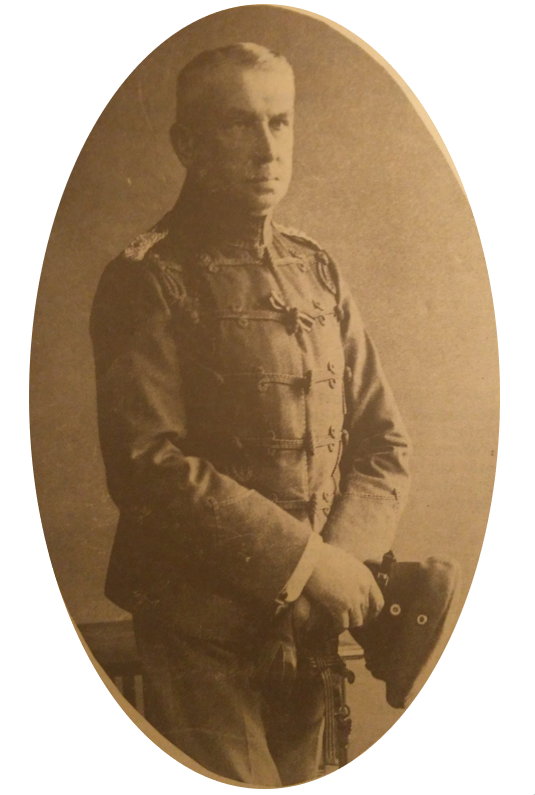
Heinrich von Schroeter

Heinrich Karl Sigismund Schroeter, as of 18 January 1901 von Schroeter, (23 September 1856 in Breslau – 25 February 1945 in Trzebnica, Lower Silesia) was a Prussian Landrat and chief of police.

== Life ==
Schroeter studied Law at the University of Breslau and Bonn. There he was a member of Corps Borussia Breslau and Corps Palatia Bonn, both fencing german student fraternities. He began his career in 1877 as a Gerichtsreferendar in Breslau. In 1880 he was appointed to the position of Regierungsreferendar. 1882 he was Regierungsassessor in Stettin and starting 1883 in Oppeln. 1885 Schroeter held the office of Landrat in Pleß until he was appointed as police director to Stettin in 1898. Starting in 1900 Schroeter held the position of chief of police in Stettin, from 1903 to 1918 in Kiel.

On 18. January 1901 Schroeter was elevated to the Prussian nobility by Wilhlem II. 1904 he was appointed Rat III and promoted by Edward VII to Honorary Commander of the Royal Victorian Order.

On 24. May 1887 Schroeter married Maria, née Walter (1864–1945). With her he had three sons and one daughter. The couple and their daughter was killed during the occupation of Trebnitz by the Red Army in 1945.
