= Schrötter =

Austrian noble family

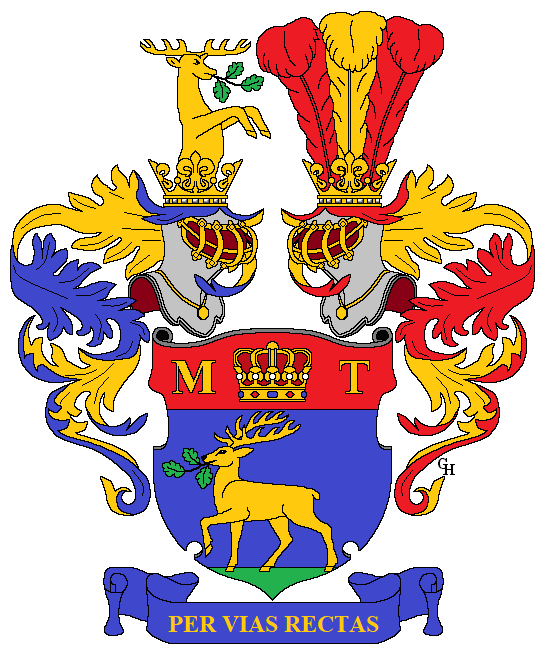
Coat of arms of the Schrötter von Kristelli

The Schrötter family is an Austrian noble family, whose members held various important positions in the Austrian Empire and Prussia.

== Notable members ==
- Anton Schrötter von Kristelli (1802–1875), Moravian-Austrian chemist and mineralogist born in Olomouc, Moravia
- Friedrich von Schrötter (1743–1815), Junker and Prussian government minister
- Hermann von Schrötter (1870–1928), Austrian physiologist and physician who was a native of Vienna
- Leopold von Schrötter (1837–1908), Austrian internist and laryngologist born in Graz
