= Elbe-Elster Land =

Region of Germany

Coordinates: 51.663889°N 13.172778°E

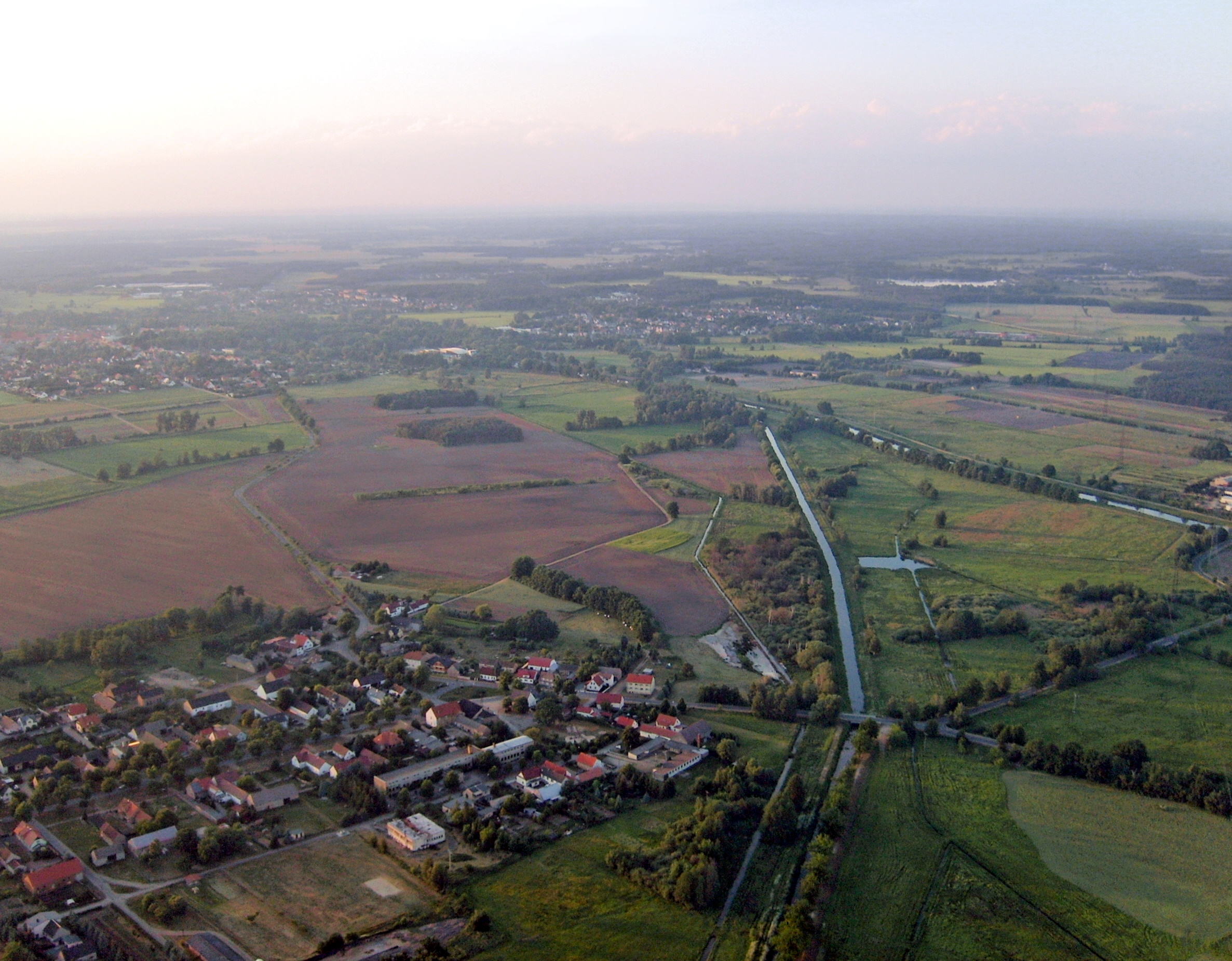
Elbe-Elster valley with the confluence of the Little Röder and the Black Elster, and the villages of Zobersdorf and Bad Liebenwerda

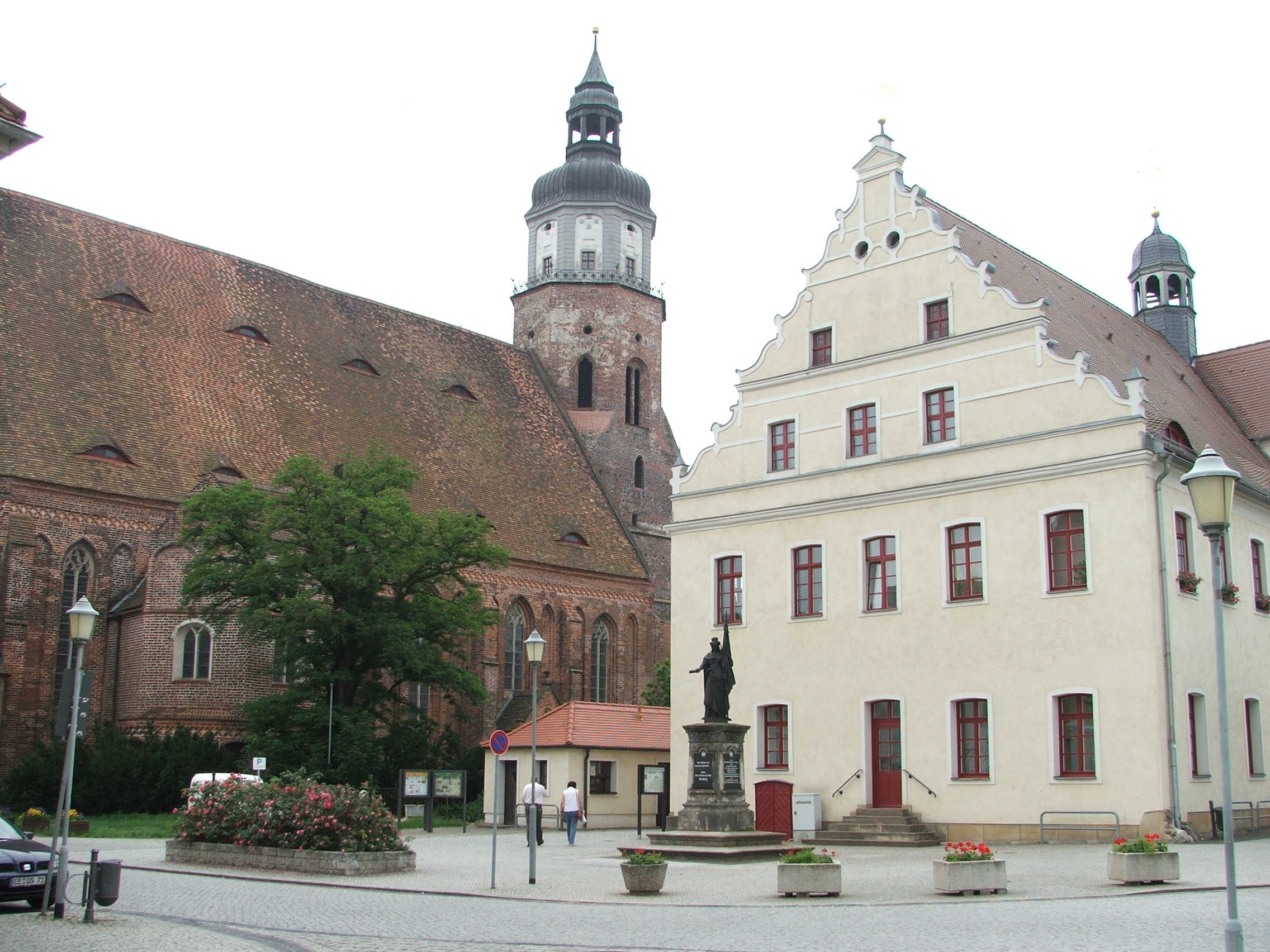
Herzberg; town hall and St. Mary's Church

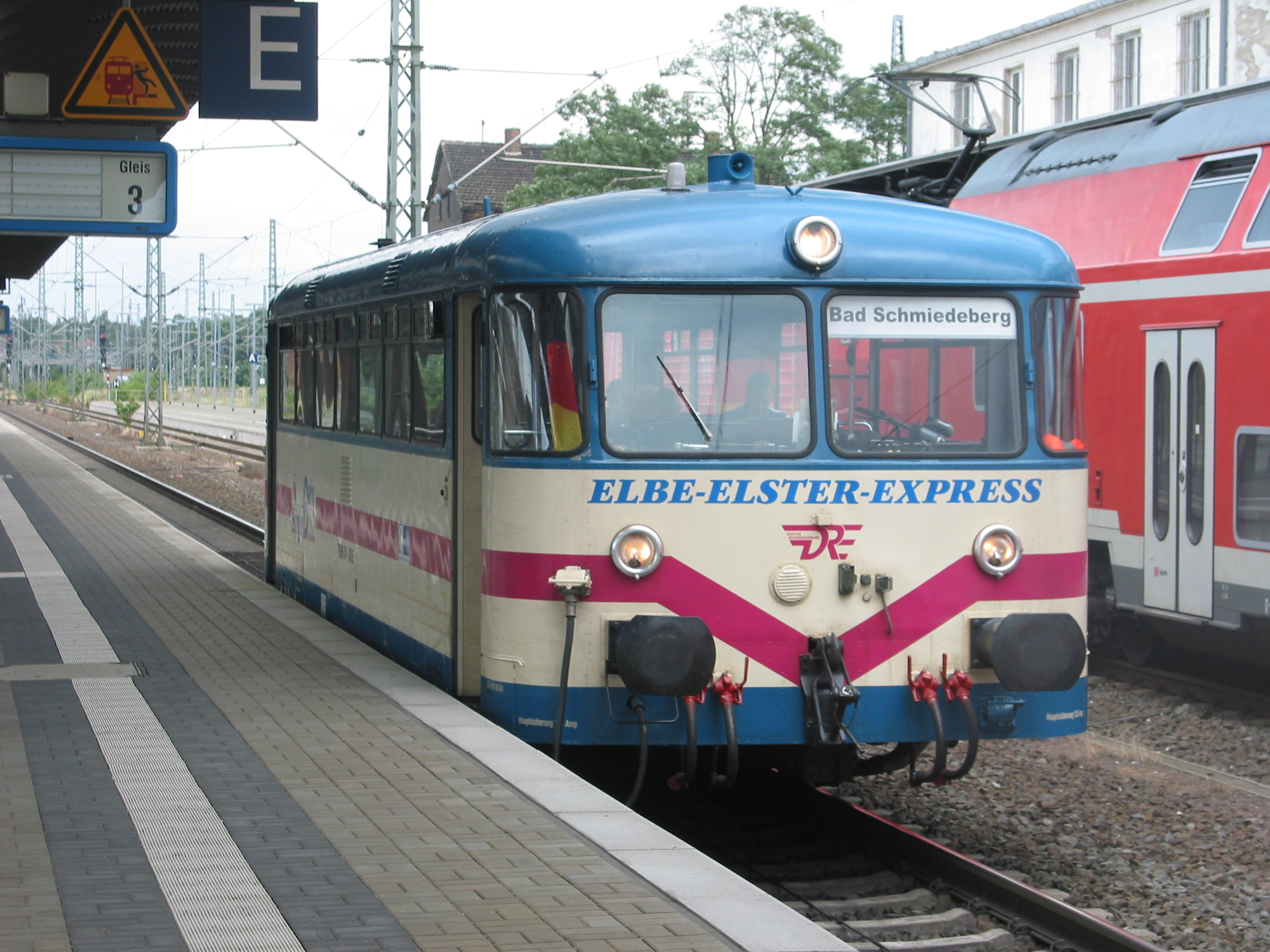
The Elbe-Elster Express

Elbe-Elster Land (German: Elbe-Elster-Land), also called the Elbe-Elster region (Elbe-Elster-Gebiet) is a region around the tripoint of the German states of Brandenburg, Saxony-Anhalt and Saxony. It is part of the North German Plain and is named after the two major rivers that have their confluence here: the Elbe and the Black Elster.

In older sources the northwestern parts of the present-day Elbe-Elster Land were called Mezumroka or "land between the rivers". It was part of the Gau Nizizi and almost unpopulated.

The region is first recorded as the "land between the Elbe and Elster" on 14 April 1312, when Frederick the Brave promised 32,000 marks in silver "to be paid within three days" to Margrave Waldemar of Brandenburg as part of the Treaty of Tangermünde following his capture near Hayn. He also promised to cede the "land between the Elbe and Elster", the March of Lusatia and the towns of Hayn and Torgau to Brandenburg.

The "land between the Elbe and Elster" was then understood to be a region that covered what later became the Electoral Saxon Ämter or districts of Mühlberg, Liebenwerda, Schweinitz and Lochau.

Today the territory of the county of Elbe-Elster which was created in 1993 is marketed and advertised for tourist purposes as the holiday region of Elbe-Elster-Land, but it also includes the western parts of Lower Lusatia around Finsterwalde and the Schraden region.

== Literature ==
- Oskar Brachwitz (1926), Geschichtliche Bilder vom Südfläming und aus der Elbe-Elster-Gegend (in German)
- Autorenkollektiv des MUG Brandenburg e. V. (1996), Heimatbuch Landkreis Elbe-Elster (in German), Herzberg
- Denkmale in Brandenburg, Landkreis Elbe-Elster (in German), vol. 7
- Renate Völker, Anja Schmidke (1995), Entdeckungen im Landkreis Elbe-Elster (in German), Delitzsch: Druck- und Verlagshaus Delitzsch, 950458996
- Manfred Woitzik (2000), Kulturamt des Landkreises Elbe-Elster (ed.), "Wer zuerst kommt – mahlt zuerst" eine Kulturgeschichte der Mühlen im Landkreis Elbe-Elster (in German), Herzberg, 967763517
- Andreas Pöschl (Hrsg.): Kohle, Wind und Wasser. Ein energiehistorischer Streifzug durch das Elbe-Elsterland. Hrsg. v. Kulturamt des Landkreises Elbe-Elster. Herzberg/Elster 2001, ISBN 3-00-008956-X.
- Kulturamt des Landkreises Elbe-Elster, ed. (2005), Orgellandschaft Elbe-Elster (in German), Herzberg/Elster
- Sven Gückel (2005), Im Elbe-Elster Land – In Elbe-Elster Country (in German), Cottbus: KDI Euroverlag, ISBN 3-938634-09-X (deutsch/englisch)
- Baudenkmale des Landkreises Elbe-Elster. (= Blattsammlung denkmalgeschützter Bauten des Landkreises Elbe-Elster)
- Matthias Donath (2007), Schlösser zwischen Elbe und Elster (in German), Meißen, 1024219674
- Juliane Stückrad (2011), Ich schimpfe nicht, ich sage nur die Wahrheit. – Eine Ethnographie des Unmuts am Beispiel der Bewohner des Elbe-Elster-Kreises (Brandenburg) (in German), Ludwig, ISBN 978-3-86935-046-2

== Periodicals ==
- "Heimatkalender für das Land zwischen Elbe und Elster" (Region Altkreis Bad Liebenwerda, the Mückenberger Ländchen, Ortrand am Schraden und Uebigau-Falkenberg) – published annually
- "Die Schwarze Elster" (heimatkundliche Schriftenreihe für den Altkreis Bad Liebenwerda)
- „Heimatkalender Herzberg“ (Region Herzberg) – published annually
- "Finsterwalder Heimatkalender" – published annually
- "Der Bomätscher" (heimatkundliche Schrift der Stadt Mühlberg/Elbe) – published quarterly
- "Der Speicher" (Jahresschrift des Kreismuseums Finsterwalde)
- "EE-Grafik" (Kunstmappe mit Grafiken ansässiger Künstler) – published annually
