= Schröter (surname) =

Schröter is a German surname, a variant of Schröder (in Silesia, Saxony and Thuringia ). It may also be written without diacritics as Schroter. Variant: Schroeter. It is an occupational name for a cloth cutter or tailor. Notable people with the surname include:

- Adam Schröter (c. 1525 – c. 1572), Silesian humanist, poet, and alchemist
- Albrecht Schröter (born 1955), German politician
- Carl Joseph Schröter (1855–1939), Swiss botanist
- Corona Schröter (1751–1802), German actress and singer
- Erich Schröter (1904–1942), German military officer
- Eva Bulling-Schröter (born 1956), German politician
- Felix Schröter (born 1996), German footballer
- Günter Schröter (1927–2016), German footballer and coach
- Heide Schröter (active 1967), West German slalom canoeist
- Heinrich Schröter (1829–92), German mathematician
- Johann Hieronymus Schröter (1745–1816), German astronomer
- Johann Samuel Schröter (1735–1808), German Protestant theologian and conchologist
- Joseph Schröter (1837–94), German mycologist
- Karl Schröter (1905–1977), German mathematician and logician
- Karl-Heinz Schröter (born 1954), German politician
- Leonhardt Schröter (c. 1532 – c. 1601), German choirmaster, teacher and composer
- Lothar Schröter (born 1952), German military historian
- Martina Schröter (born 1960), German rower
- Maximilian Schröter (born 1994), German politician
- Moritz Schröter (1851–1925), German industrial engineer
- Morris Schröter (born 1995), German footballer
- Silvio Schröter (born 1979), German football player
- Susanne Schröter (born 1957), German social anthropologist
- Tobias Schröter (born 1964), East German pair skater
- Victor Schröter (1839–1901), Russian architect
- Wilhelm Schröter (born 1960), Brazilian composer and pianist
