= Landrat =

German Political Office

Party affiliation of German Landrats and mayors of independent cities (June 2023)

The Landrat (German pronunciation: [ˈlantˌʁaːt]) is the chief administrative officer of a German Landkreis or Kreis and thus the highest municipal official. In most states they are also the lower state administrative authority (so-called "dual position" (Note: or "Janusköpfigkeit") of the Landrat). They represent the Kreis externally and are elected in most States of Germany directly.

== History ==
The title Landrat was adopted for the lowest administrative authorities in individual small German states, namely in Saxe-Altenburg, Saxe-Coburg and Gotha, Saxe-Meiningen, as well as in the Imperial County of Reuss and in the Schwarzburg principalities (Schwarzburg-Rudolstadt and Schwarzburg-Sondershausen). In the Kingdom of Bavaria, where with their introduction in right-wing districts since 1828 Landräte elected, the assembly appointed to represent a Kreisgemeinde was called Landrat. In Mecklenburg, the eight representatives of the native or received nobility in the ständisches Direktorium were called Landrats. Two Landrats belonged to the Engeren Ausschuss of the Knights and Countryside.

The official title of a Landrat could differ. In Alsace-Lorraine from 1871 to 1918, the official title Kreisdirektor. In Hesse-Darmstadt it was called Kreisrat. In the Duchy of Nassau 1849 to 1853 it was Kreisamtmann.

== Individual regulations ==
In Lower Saxony and North Rhine-Westphalia, according to the old legal situation, the Oberkreisdirektor (OKD) was the main administrative official. The honorary Landrat performed only representative duties (so-called "Zweigleisigkeit" or "Doppelspitze"). The Kreisordnung in North Rhine-Westphalia stipulated that from the municipal election of 1999, the Landräte should be full-time Wahlbeamter and thus also principal administrative officials. However, the counties were given the option to make this change as early as 1994. Since 1999, the district administrator was directly elected for a five year term, and since 2009 for six years. If the district administrator left prematurely, a Landrat election took place, with the term of office then lasting until the end of the next municipal election period, i.e. longer than five years. In Lower Saxony, the dual leadership was abolished in 1996.

== Literature ==
- Christiane Eifert: Paternalismus und Politik – Preußische Ländräte im 19. Jahrhundert. Münster 2003
- Claudia Wilke: Die Landräte der Kreise Teltow und Niederbarnim im Kaiserreich. Potsdam 1998, ISBN 3-930850-70-2.
- Jürgen W. Schmidt: Die Landräte des Kreises Westprignitz von 1860 bis 1920. In: Mitteilungen des Vereins für Geschichte der Prignitz, Bd. 12. Perleberg 2012, S. 5–60 (auf den S. 5–12 Allgemeines zu den Landräten in Preußen und ihren Aufgaben).
- Horst Romeyk: Die leitenden staatlichen und kommunalen Verwaltungsbeamten der Rheinprovinz 1816–1945 (= Publikationen der Gesellschaft für Rheinische Geschichtskunde. Band 69). Droste, Düsseldorf 1994, ISBN 3-7700-7585-4.
