= Zeischa =

District of the spa town of Bad Liebenwerda, Germany

- Ortsteil (city district) of Bad Liebenwerda
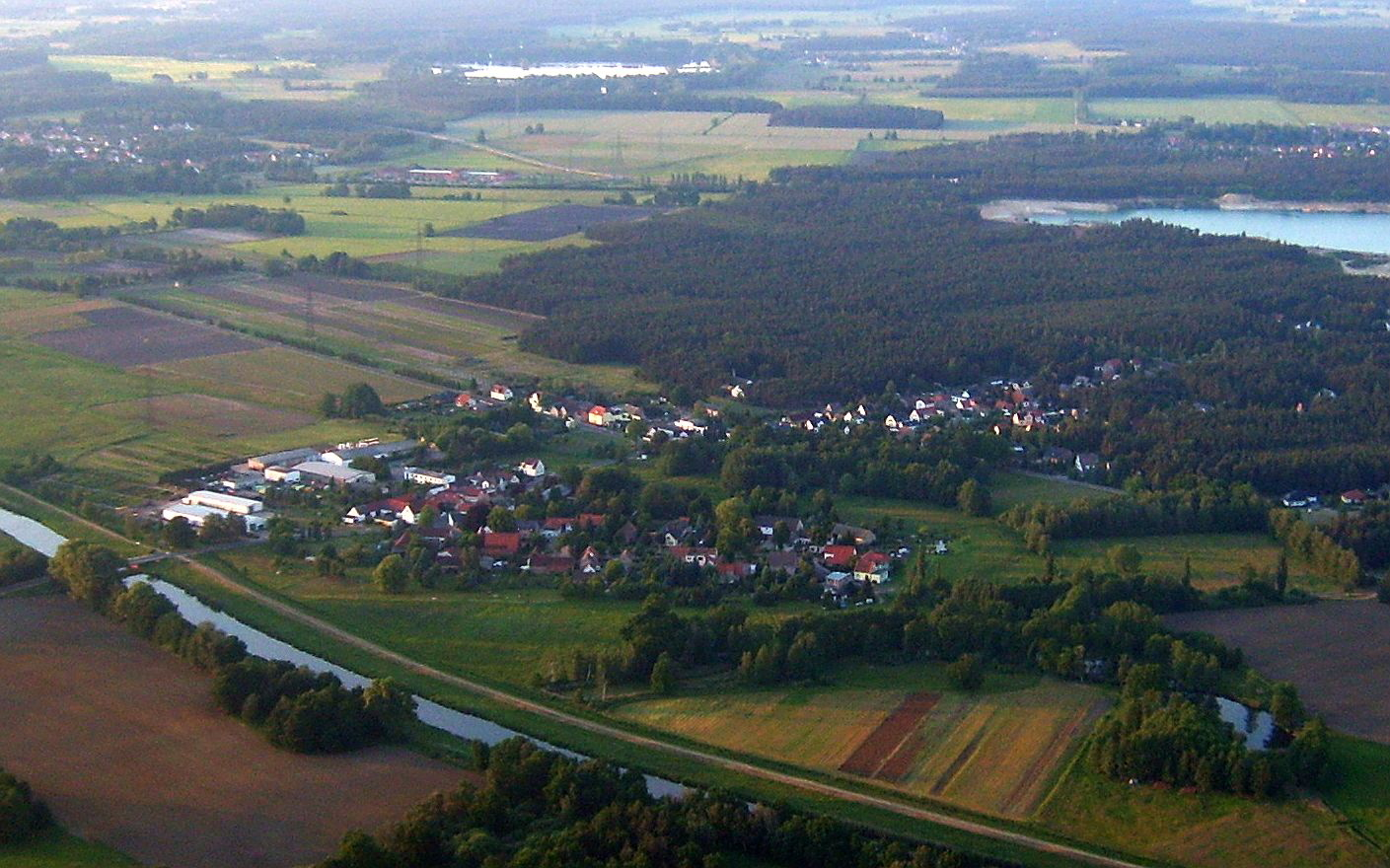
- Aerial view of Zeischa from the south-east

- Location of Zeischa in Bad Liebenwerda
- Interactive map of Zeischa
- Location within Germany Location within Brandenburg
- Coordinates: 51°29′58″N 13°25′21″E
- Country: Germany
- State: Brandenburg
- City: Bad Liebenwerda
- Elevation: 86 m (282 ft)

Population
  - Total: 472 (31 December 2,016)
- Time zone: UTC+01:00 (CET)
  - Summer (DST): UTC+02:00 (CEST)
- Postal codes: 04924
- Dialling codes: 035341

Zeischa (German pronunciation: [ˈtsaɪʃa]) is an Ortsteil of the spa town of Bad Liebenwerda in the district of Elbe-Elster in southern Brandenburg. The village is located about three kilometres from the town centre in the Lower Lusatian Heath Nature Park on the banks of the Black Elster River.

According to tradition, Harigsburg Castle, in the vicinity of Zeischa, which was first documented in 1391, was once a Slavic knight's stronghold that protected the crossing of the Black Elster River. Since immemorial, the inhabitants have lived from agriculture, cattle breeding and fishing. Towards the end of the 19th century, the first forest tree nurseries were established, and their fields can still be seen in the Elster valley. Around the same time, gravel extraction began north of the village, creating an 80-hectare dredging pond, part of which has been used as a recreational area since the 1960s.

Zeischa, which belonged to the district of Bad Liebenwerda before its incorporation in 1993, currently has 472 inhabitants.

The former village school, constructed in 1904, and the grave of Liebenwerda mayor Elias Borßdorff, who was killed by Swedish mercenaries near Zeischa during the Thirty Years' War, are designated as monuments of the state of Brandenburg.

== Geography ==
=== Geography and natural space ===
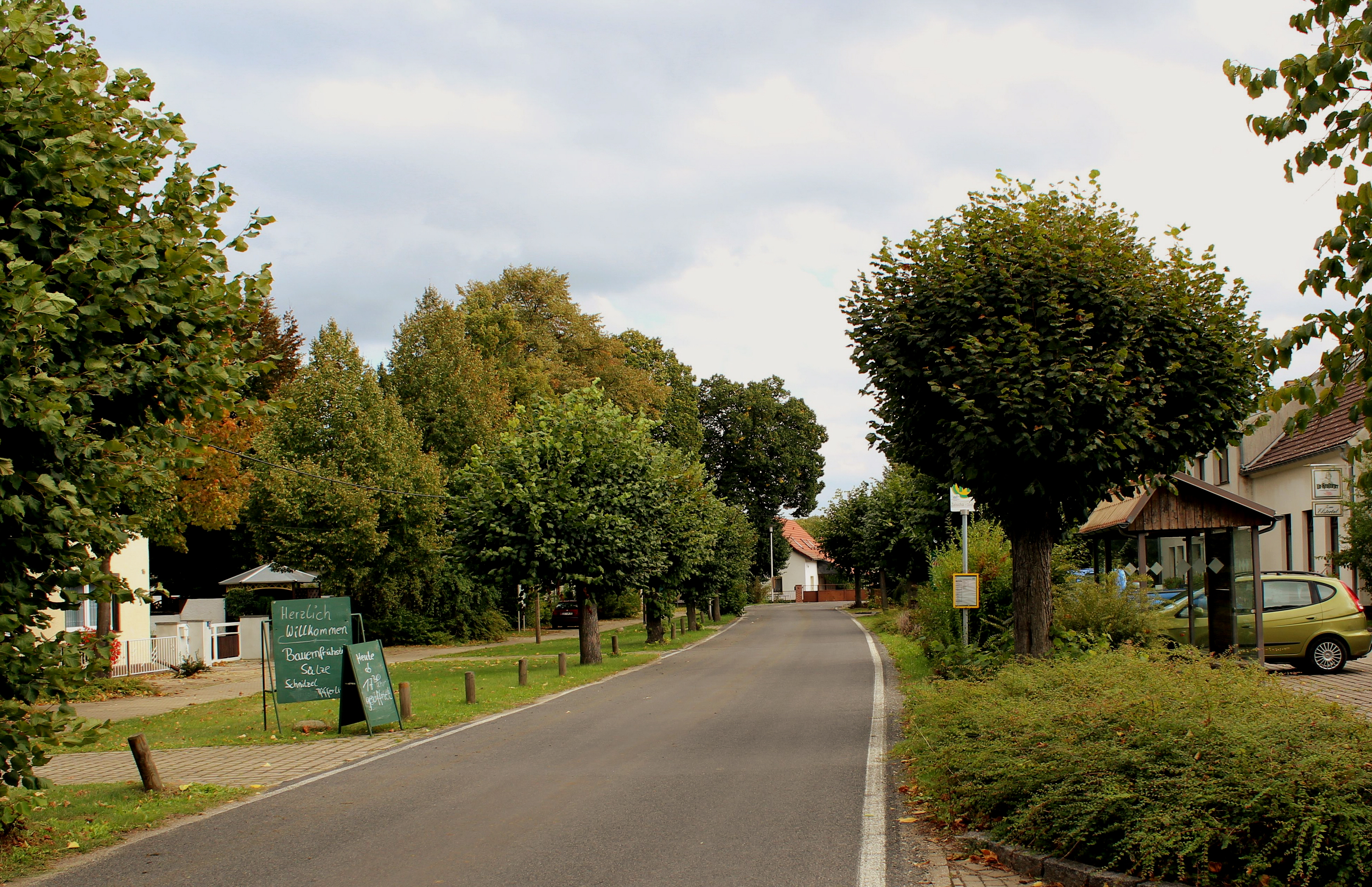
The historic town centre of Zeischa

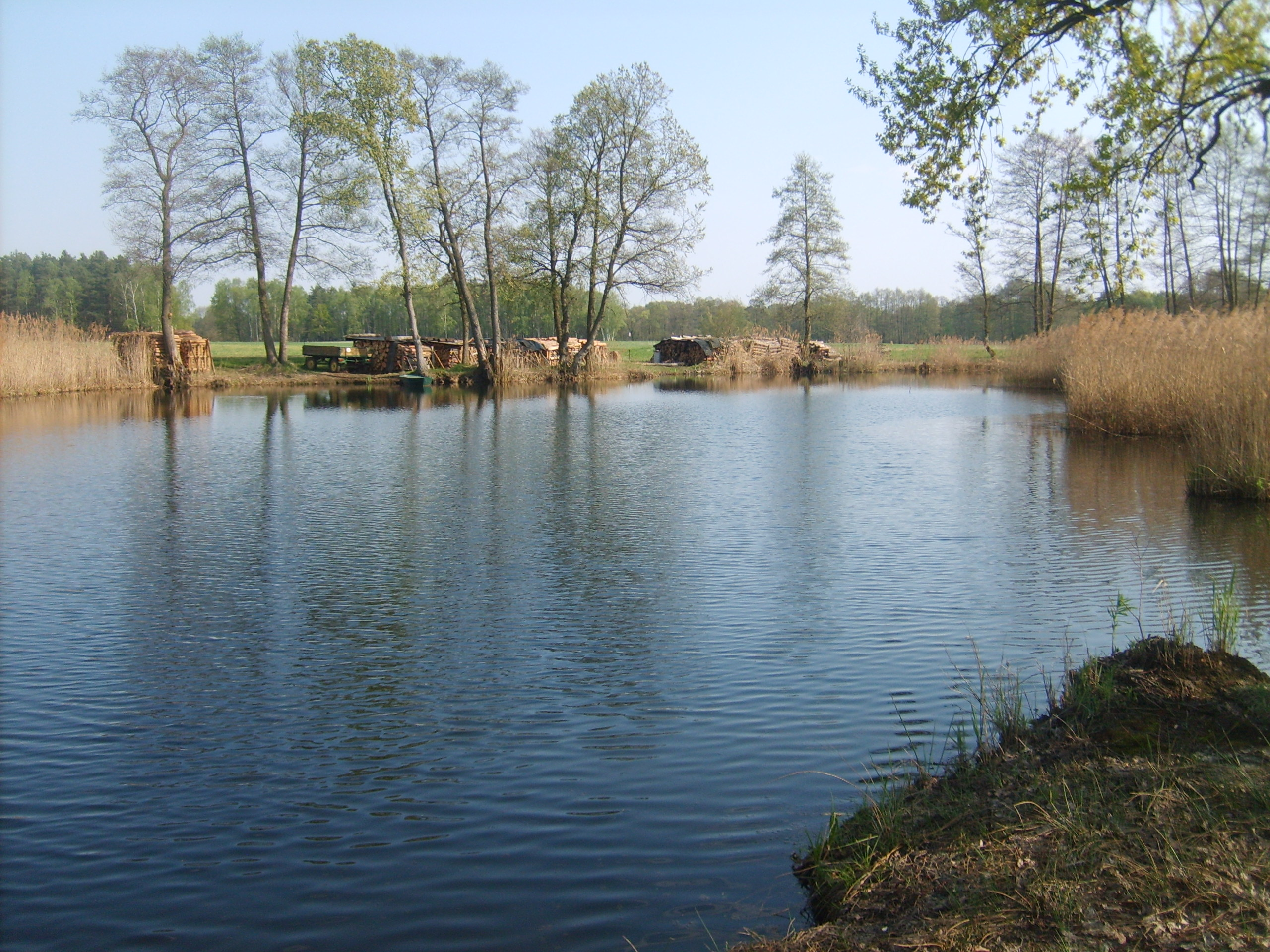
The Elsteraue landscape conservation area, with a former flow of the Black Elster

Zeischa, in the Elbe-Elster region, is a district of the spa town of Bad Liebenwerda in southern Brandenburg. The village lies immediately to the east of the town and extends from there to the L 593. It lies to the right of the Black Elster at the mouth of the Kleine Röder in the Breslau-Magdeburg glacial valley, which reaches its narrowest point about ten kilometres to the east in the seven-kilometre-wide Schraden lowlands and then swings to the north-west. The Hohenleipisch-Plessa terminal moraine rises to the north-east of the village. The landforms of this area were formed between 230,000 and 130,000 years ago during the Saale glaciation. In the south-facing outwash of the Hohenleipisch-Plessa terminal moraine, Saale glacial sands, gravel sands and gravels are found, which are characterised by their purity and high homogeneity. They have been mined industrially in Zeischa since the end of the 19th century. The resulting gravel pit, located to the north of Zeischa, now covers an area of about 80 hectares.

Parts of the village are included in the 6011-hectare Elsteraue landscape reserve, which is divided into three ecological areas. The Elsteraue II sub-area is located in the region of Zeischa. One of the tasks of the landscape conservation area is "to preserve the area because of its special importance for natural recreation in the area of the spa town of Bad Liebenwerda". Zeischa is also surrounded by the Lower Lusatian Heath Nature Park, which covers an area of 484 square kilometres in the Elbe-Elster and Oberspreewald-Lausitz districts. Its centrepiece, the Forsthaus Prösa Nature Reserve, with one of the largest contiguous sessile oak forests in Central Europe, lies north-east of the B 101 in the former Liebenwerda Heath.

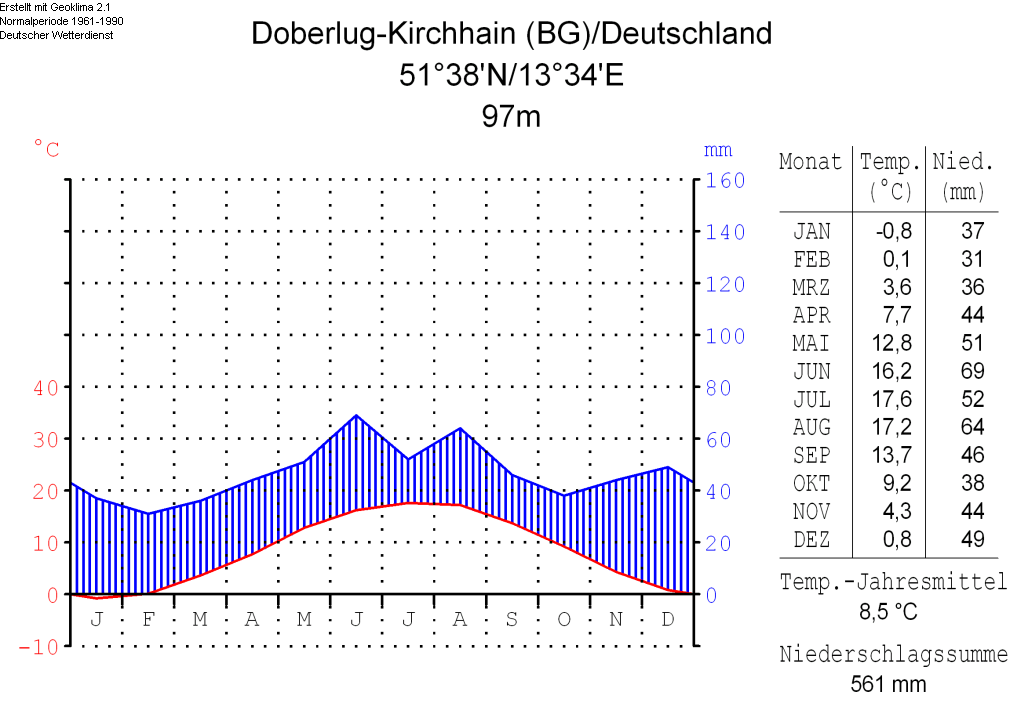
Climate diagram of Doberlug-Kirchhain about 20 km north-east of Zeischa

=== Climate ===
Zeischa is situated in the so-called Black Elster area of the inland climate, although there is a transition to the continental climate. The regional climatic elements are not very pronounced and are essentially determined by the peculiarities of the east-west oriented relief of the Breslau-Magdeburg glacial valley and the mountain ranges of the terminal moraines bordering it to the north and south.

The month with the least precipitation is February and the month with the most precipitation is July. The average annual air temperature at the Doberlug-Kirchhain weather station, located 20 kilometres to the north, is 8.5 °C. The annual variation between the coldest month of January and the warmest month of July is 18.4 °C.

Climate data for Doberlug-Kirchhain
Month	Jan	Feb	Mar	Apr	May	Jun	Jul	Aug	Sep	Oct	Nov	Dec	Year
Average precipitation inches (mm)	1.5 (37)	1.3 (33)	1.3 (34)	1.8 (45)	2.1 (54)	2.8 (70)	2.8 (72)	2.6 (66)	1.9 (48)	1.9 (49)	1.6 (41)	1.9 (48)	23.5 (597)
Source: Der Schraden, p. 14

== History ==
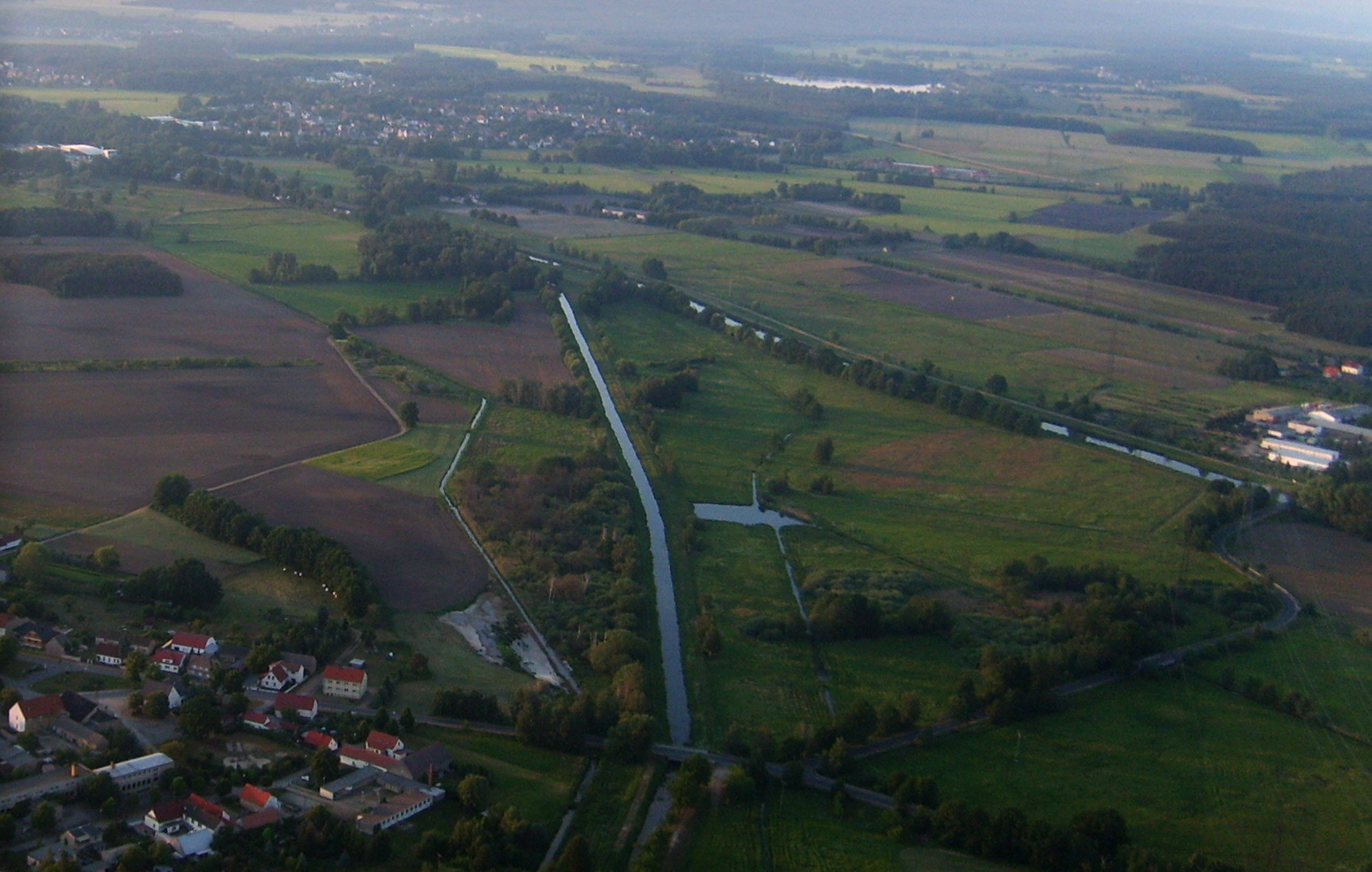
The former site of the Harigsburg castle; the estuary of the Kleine Röder between Zeischa and Zobersdorf

=== Origin and foundation of the village ===
Zeischa, whose round hamlet form of the old village centre with the open square is still recognisable today, was probably founded in the course of the medieval German land expansion. The village was first settled by Slavic Sorbs. From the earliest times, the inhabitants of the village have been engaged in agriculture, animal husbandry and fishing.

The so-called Harigsburg castle, which secured the river crossing, was once located close to today's Elster bridge. According to tradition, around the year 1000, it was a protective fortress of the Slavic knighthood under the knight Aribo. In the chronicle of the town of Liebenwerda published in 1837, the author Carl von Lichtenberg described a feud from the years between 1058 and 1072. In the course of the conflict that broke out between the Brehna counts and the unspecified Heyder knights over the election of the abbot of the Dobrilugk Abbey, the village of Grabo (a deserted area between Wahrenbrück and Uebigau), the Lausitz outpost and Harigsburg Castle are said to have been destroyed. The defeated Heyder knights were ultimately punished and deprived of their possessions. In addition, the captured knight Aribo was sentenced to starvation.

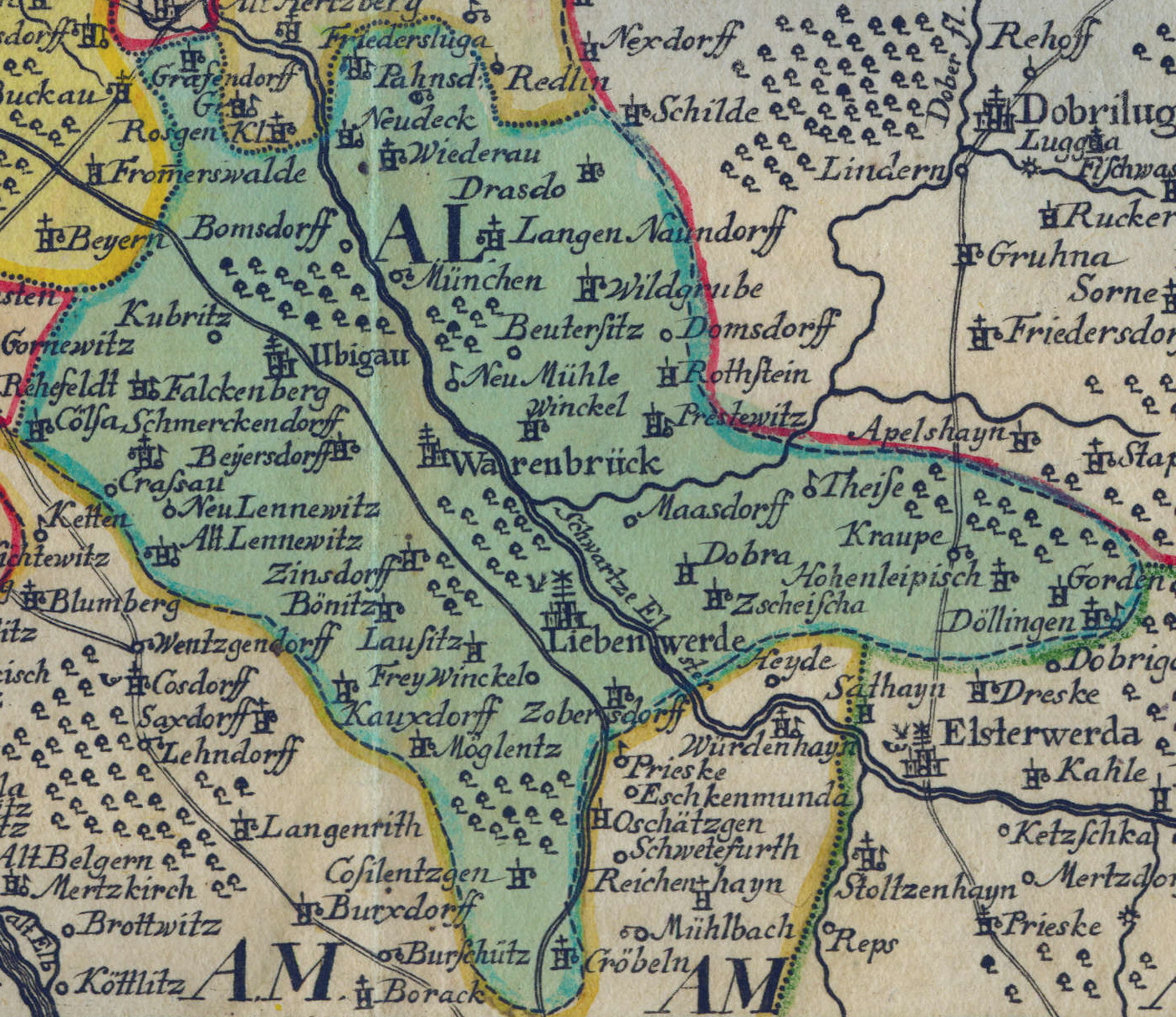
Electoral Saxon Office Liebenwerda

Since the Cistercian abbey of Dobrilugk, among others, was only founded between 1165 and 1184 and other dates in the work were later disproved, Lichtenberg's information mentioned without clear sources is considered uncertain from today's perspective.

Veste Harig was first mentioned in documents in 1235. In that year, Margrave Henry of Meissen enfeoffed the honey master Ulrich von Rummelshain with the "Land an der Premnitz", an area that included the villages of Thalberg and Knissen as well as the Veste Harig on the Black Elster. However, there is still no tangible proof of the existence of the fortress. The Liebenwerda local historian M. Karl Fitzkow surmised in the Local History Calendar of Liebenwerda published in 1955 that Harigsburg Castle was subsequently rebuilt. However, it is not known when it actually disappeared, as it was never mentioned again. It was only in June 2011 that two local researchers were able to identify the exact location using historical ordnance survey maps and aerial photographs, where they found 700-year-old shards of hard-fired grey ware, thus providing archaeological evidence of the castle.

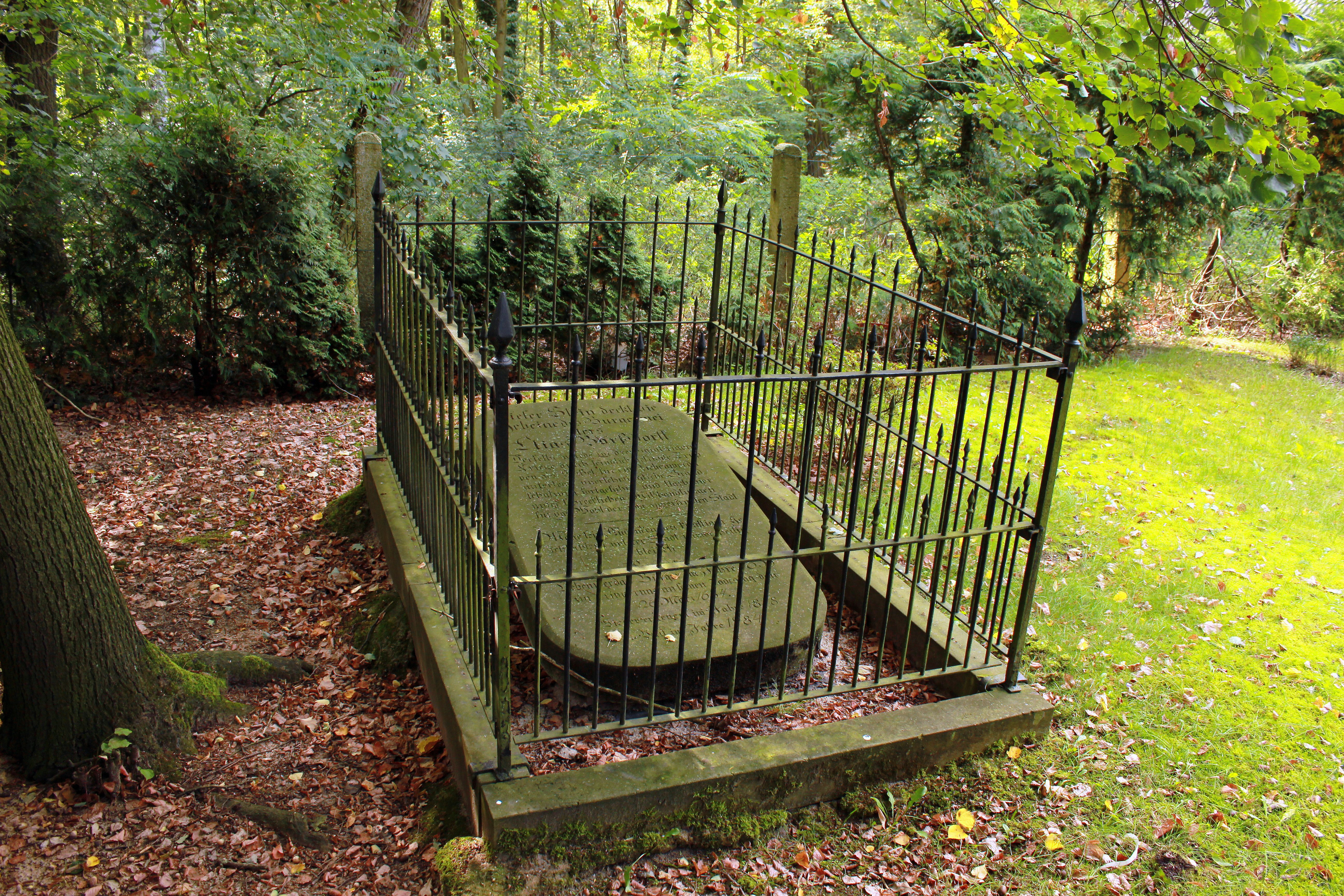
Gravestone in honour of the mayor of Liebenwerda, Elias Borßdorff

=== First documented mention and development of the place name ===
The village was first mentioned in documents in 1391 concerning the payment of levies to the Liebenwerda town church and castle chapel. In the document, the village is mentioned with the name Czscheisaw. The village subsequently appeared under various place names. Around 1422, Zeischa was also mentioned as Cziso, which is similar to the modern Polish word Cisza and means "calm" or "quiet" in English.

Other spellings of the place name were: 1457 Cziszaw, Czysow, 1460 Zcysow, 1489 Cscheyscha, 1490 Tscheischa, 1500 Zcscheissow, 1504 Zschopsau, 1529 Czischa, 1550 Zeischa, Zceyschaw, 1555 Zscheischaw, Tschissa, 1608 Zeise, Zscheischa, Zeischa and 1752 Zscheischa.

The village was part of the Saxon Electoral Office of Liebenwerda. The inhabitants had to go to the court in the neighbouring village of Dobra to the north, to which Zeischa, Dobra itself, Liebenwerda (except for the castle district), Maasdorf (Bad Liebenwerda) and Zobersdorf belonged.

=== From the Thirty Years' War to the Wars of Liberation ===
Like many neighbouring villages, Zeischa was affected by the Thirty Years' War. As early as 1612, however, a fire destroyed large parts of the village when five farmsteads burned down. One event in the war that followed, which brought much misery and plundering to the entire region by passing troops, occurred on 26 May 1634 and is still remembered today: on that day, the mayor of Liebenwerda, Elias Borßdorff, was dragged to his death by horses near the village by Swedish troops after he refused to hand over the town treasury and 25,000 thalers in contributions, as well as other demands. Almost three years later (1637), troops under the Swedish general Johan Banér camped in Torgau, some thirty kilometres to the west, from January until early summer. They roamed the neighbouring Elbe-Elster region, plundering and burning villages. Zeischa was not spared during this period. By 1659, due to the war, only five of the original fourteen families were left.

During the Coalition Wars in the spring of 1813, the area between Haidchensberg in Liebenwerda and Zeischa was besieged by Prussian troops. The troops marched as far as Zobersdorf, about a kilometre to the south, to keep Napoleon's soldiers at bay. The autumn also saw huge French and Prussian troops movements in the run-up to the Battle of Leipzig. At the end of September 1813, the corps of the Prussian generals Dobschütz and Tauentzien, with 30,000 men, took up quarters in Liebenwerda for ten days.

=== From the Congress of Vienna to land reform ===
Following the provisions of the Congress of Vienna in 1815, the Kingdom of Saxony, to which Zeischa belonged, had to cede large parts of its territory, which meant that the town now belonged to the administrative district of Merseburg in the Prussian province of Saxony. During the subsequent administrative reorganisation in 1816, the district of Liebenwerda was created, into which a large part of the Mühlberg office, the Liebenwerda office and parts of the Großenhain office were absorbed.

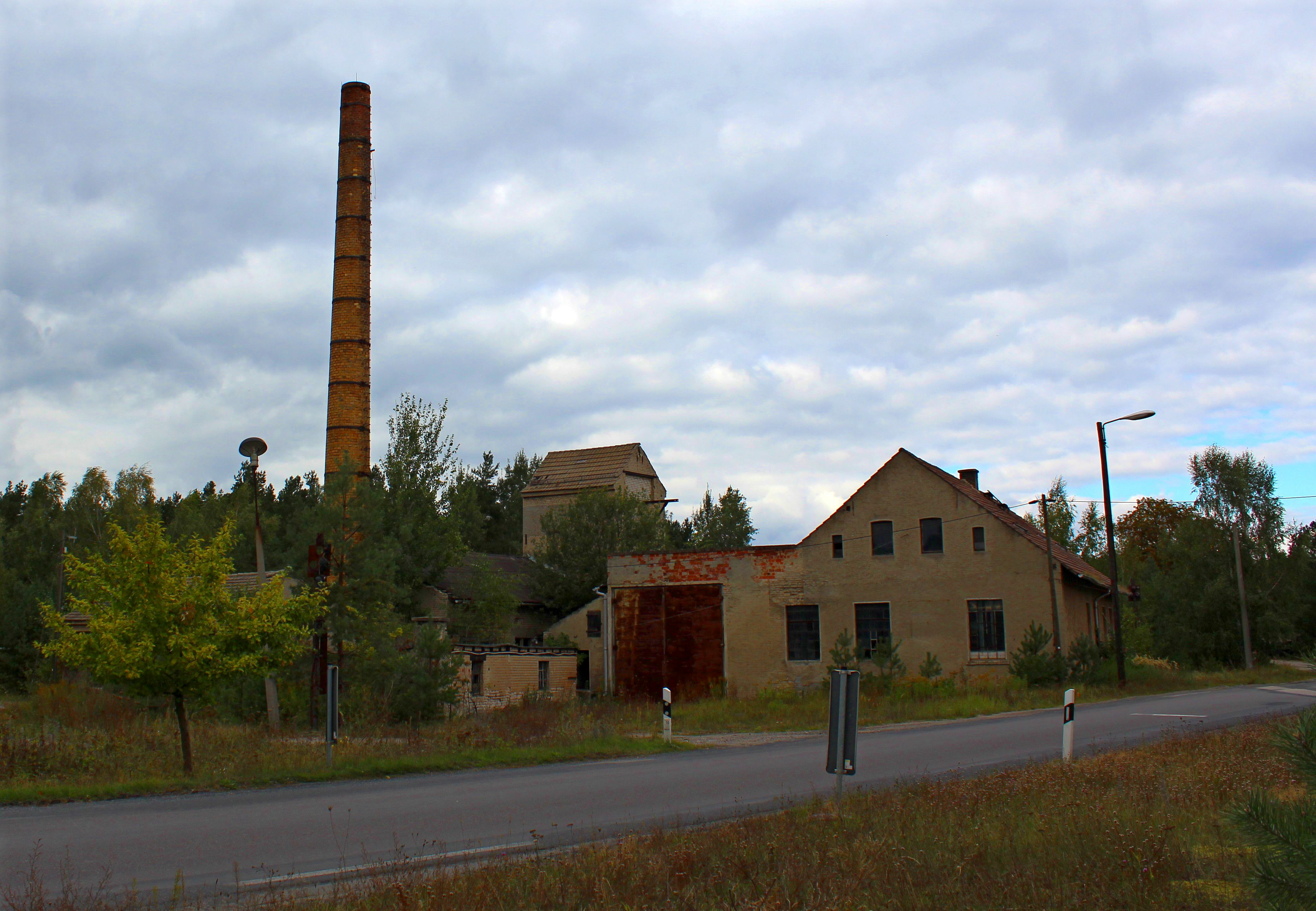
Former premises of the Weiland company on the L 593

Like almost all villages located on the Black Elster, Zeischa was also threatened by constantly recurring floods from the river, which flows through the lowlands with numerous tributaries. During the Seven Years' War in 1763, it was reported that eleven farmers in Zeischa tried in vain to wring yields from their fields because the constant flooding of the Black Elster was spoiling the crops. From the 16th century onwards, the Saxon government therefore tried a wide variety of measures to control these forces of nature and contain their effects. After the Prussian provincial government had been developing plans for regulation since 1817, the large-scale Elster regulation works from Zeischa in the direction of Würdenhain finally began in 1852. By 1863, the river had been given its current bed and diked over a length of around ninety kilometres, at times employing up to 1,200 workers. This made it one of the most narrowed rivers in Central Europe.

With the regulation of the Black Elster, most of the streams were filled in and the meadows close to the river could gradually be cultivated. After the first forest nursery was founded in neighbouring Haida in 1875, tree nurseries soon became established in Zeischa. In 1883, the Zeischa tree nursery owner Gottfried Reichenbach began cultivating woody plants. He was followed by the brothers Eduard and August Andrack in 1888. The cultivation areas of the Zeischa tree nurseries stretch through the lowlands close to the Zeischa village centre to the present day. At the same time, the incipient industrialisation of the Zeischa area had an increasing impact on the village. In June 1874, the Upper Lusatian railway from Kohlfurt via Biehla to Falkenberg/Elster (Węgliniec-Roßlau railway line) was handed over. Zeischa also got its own station at this time.

Towards the end of the 19th century, the village gradually developed another characteristic tradition. In 1888, Carl Weiland, a businessman and manufacturer from Liebenwerda, began quarrying gravel to the north-east of Zeischa, creating the quarry pond that now characterises the landscape. Initially, Weiland supplied mainly to the road building industry, but increasing railway construction also brought growing sales. A hard stone factory was built in the eastern corridor. The Zeischa gravel proved to be a very good concrete gravel, even without extensive processing. The company was given a siding to the neighbouring railway line, which also used areas in the Haida corridor and was occasionally served by the gravel works there. Around 1900, the company was divided into two lines: the so-called Liebenwerda gravel line with the Zeischa gravel pit on the one hand, and the Maasdorf estate line with the Schwarzkollm and Kamenz quarries on the other.

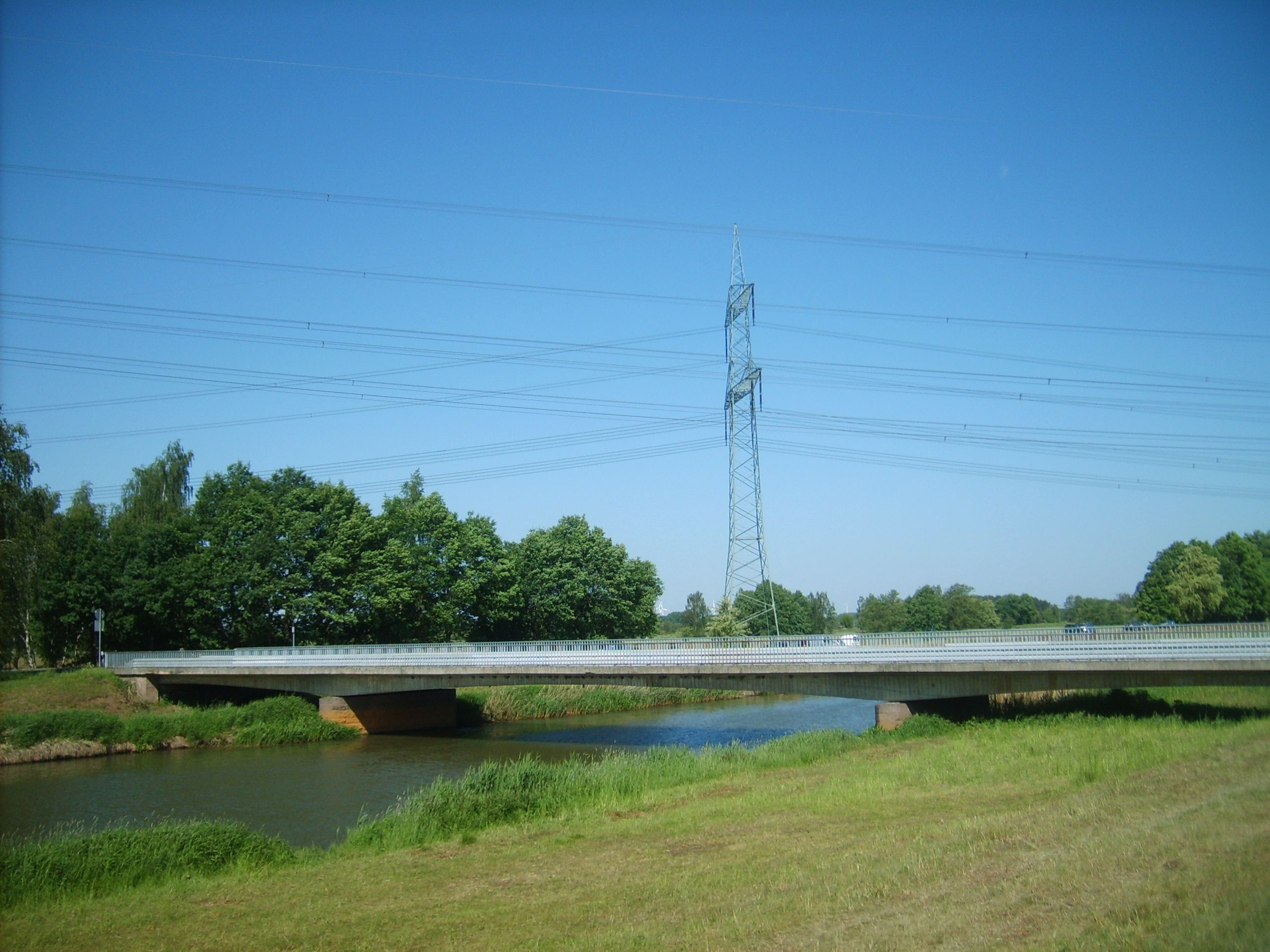
The Elster Bridge built in 1966-67

The Maasdorf manor was finally divided up in 1945 as part of the land reform, and the Zeischa family estate also became public property. It could only be reacquired by the heirs after German reunification.

=== GDR ===
After the founding of the German Democratic Republic in October 1949, today's Zeischa sports ground was built the following year and a funeral hall was erected at the cemetery in 1955. The nearby gravel lake, which had long before been discovered by the local population as a bathing spot, now increasingly attracted the interest of those seeking relaxation. The first bungalow development was built here in 1964 and the forest pool was finally opened in 1970. A wooden bridge built between 1956 and 1957 over the Schwarze Elster towards the neighbouring village of Zobersdorf was replaced by a concrete bridge in 1966-67.

Other improvements to Zeischa's infrastructure included the construction of a grocery store on Bahnhofstrasse (1967–68), a fire station (1970), the conversion of a barn into a multi-purpose hall (1973) and a bowling alley (1976–77). Between 1983 and 1985, on the initiative of the tree nursery in Zeischa, a child day care centre was built, which was inaugurated on 5 March 1986. At the same time, a children's holiday camp and a branch of the Liebenwerda "Station junger Naturforscher" were built at the forest pool. Shortly before reunification, a medical centre was built in Waldbadstraße in 1988 and 1989.

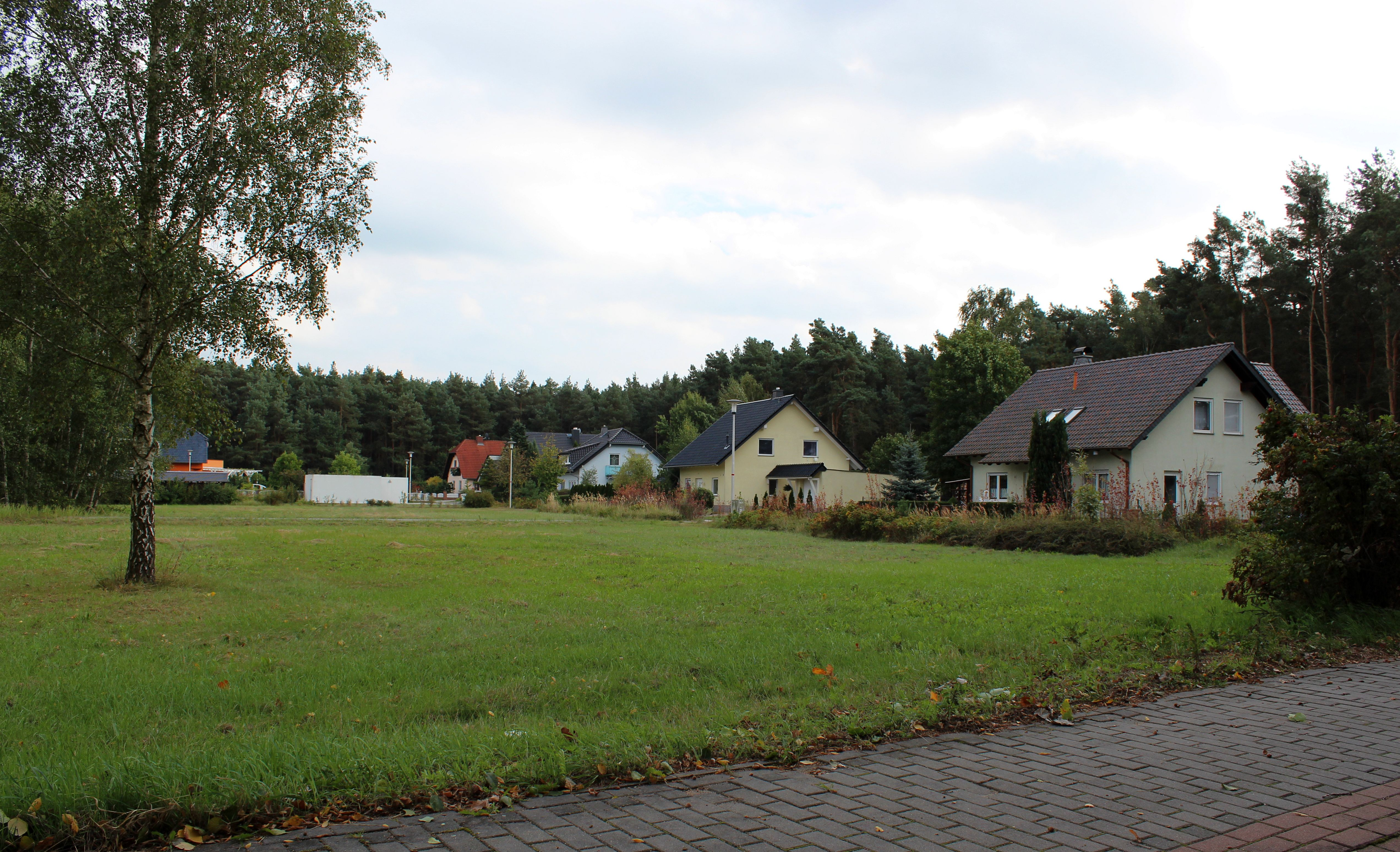
"Am Holzplan" housing estate

=== Recent past ===
As a result of German reunification, the Zeischa gravel works temporarily became the property of the Weiland family again. As construction activity in the new federal states increased with reunification, so did the demand for building materials from Zeischa. The gravel pit, whose banks in the west reached roughly as far as the Zeischa - Dobra local road and where the raw materials had been extracted using dredgers since 1970, expanded rapidly, so that the local connection to Dobra was soon broken.

A short time later, in 1991 and 1992, the drinking water and sewage pipes were laid in the village, followed by the redesign of the Zeischa village green. In addition, the "Am Holzplan" housing estate has been under construction in the south-east of the village on the 6210 district road since 1995.

Administratively, Zeischa belonged to the district of Bad Liebenwerda until the district reform in Brandenburg in 1993, which merged with the districts of Herzberg and Finsterwalde to form the district of Elbe-Elster on 6 December 1993. On the same day, the municipality was incorporated into the town of Bad Liebenwerda together with the villages of Dobra, Kosilenzien, Kröbeln, Lausitz, Maasdorf, Möglenz, Neuburxdorf, Oschätzchen, Prieschka, Thalberg, Theisa and Zobersdorf.

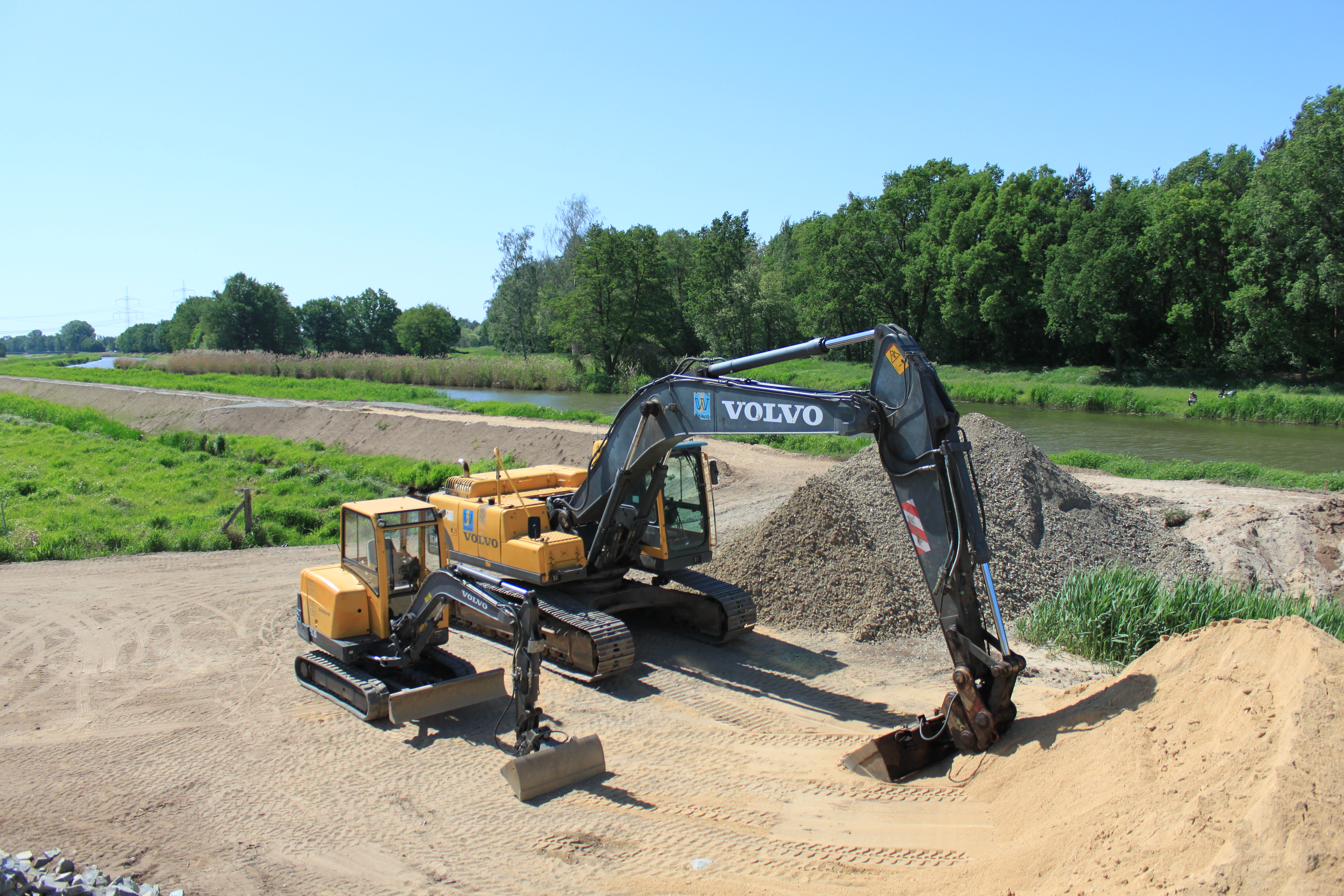
Dyke construction site near Zeischa in early summer 2012

When a so-called Vb weather situation with widespread rainfall in the region led to a once-in-a-century flood of the Black Elster in autumn 2010, a particularly precarious situation arose between Zeischa and Liebenwerda. The dyke had softened so much due to the masses of water that even the emergency services rushing to help could no longer access the section and it was in danger of collapsing. After the dyke of the Kleine Röder, which flows into the endangered section, had already been slit at Zobersdorf to relieve the situation, it was now necessary to build a replacement dyke about one kilometre long in the shortest possible time to stop the water in the event of a dyke breach.

Zeischa ultimately survived the flood without being inundated, and the endangered section of the dyke, which is demonstrably one of the oldest sections on the entire river, was finally completely renewed over a length of 1.5 kilometres in 2011 and 2012.

=== Population development ===
At the time of the Coalition Wars, around 1800, the village consisted of 16 landowners, 22 buildings and six dwellings. In 1818 the surviving figures are more precise. According to them, 105 people lived in Zeischa at that time. In 1835 there were 99 inhabitants and the village consisted of 20 houses.

It was only with the beginning industrialisation of the region towards the end of the 19th century that the population began to increase. Zeischa had 150 inhabitants in 1875 and 250 in 1910. After the number of inhabitants rose to 493 by 1946 - partly due to the influx of displaced persons from the German eastern territories after the Second World War - it fell again in the following years. In 1999, Zeischa reached its highest population to date with 512 inhabitants. In 2011, 432 inhabitants lived in this district.

== Culture and attractions ==
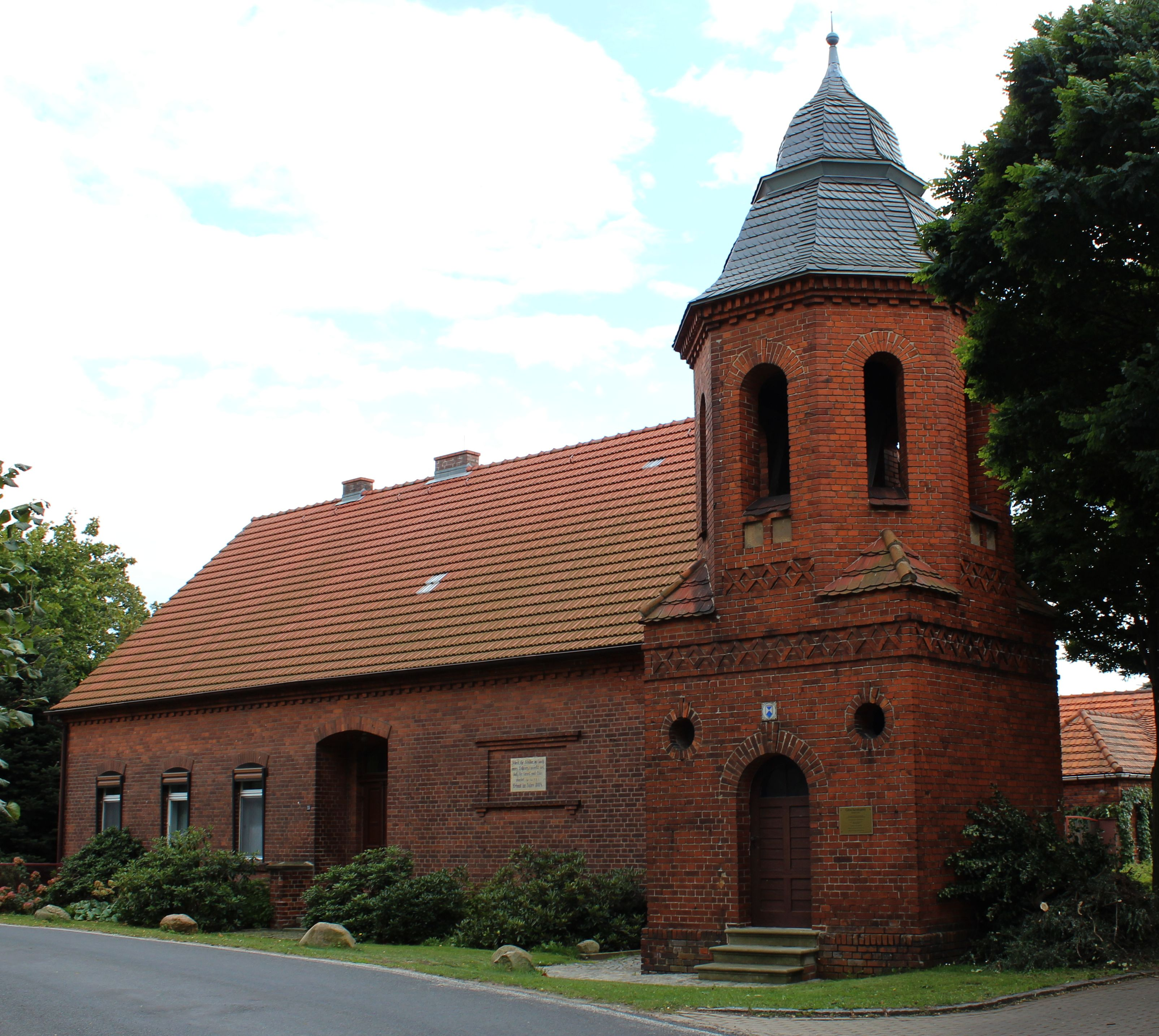
Old school with belfry

=== Buildings and monuments ===
The most striking buildings in Zeischa are the former Zeischa village school and its red brick belfry at the western end of the historic village green. They are on the list of monuments of the state of Brandenburg. The school replaced a school building from 1829. As the municipality was unable to meet the royal government's demand for an increase in the annual teacher's salary from 84 thalers and 20 groschen to 120 thalers, it was shared with neighbouring Zobersdorf for a few years from 1851 and finally closed in 1861. The children of the village therefore attended the school in Zobersdorf. They had to cross the Black Elster River, which separated the two villages, which caused considerable difficulties and dangers during floods. The school in Zobersdorf eventually reached its capacity due to the increasing number of pupils in both villages. Negotiations to build a new school in Zeischa, which had already begun, were abandoned in 1897 due to lack of funds. They were resumed three years later, however, after the six-year-old daughter of the tree nursery owner Reichenbach drowned on her way to school after falling into the river on 6 December 1900. Zeischa businessman Carl Weiland promised financial support for the building by loaning the community the estimated cost of the building, contributing 2,000 marks to the construction and also promising to pay 10 marks a year in school fees for the children of his employees. With the prospect of 9550 marks in building aid from the Royal Government, the school was finally built. It was opened on 27 November 1904, shortly after the new village teacher moved in. Almost three years later, on 14 July 1907, a bell, also donated by Weiland, was inaugurated. After his death, a memorial stone was erected near the railway crossing on the main road 593, which still stands today.

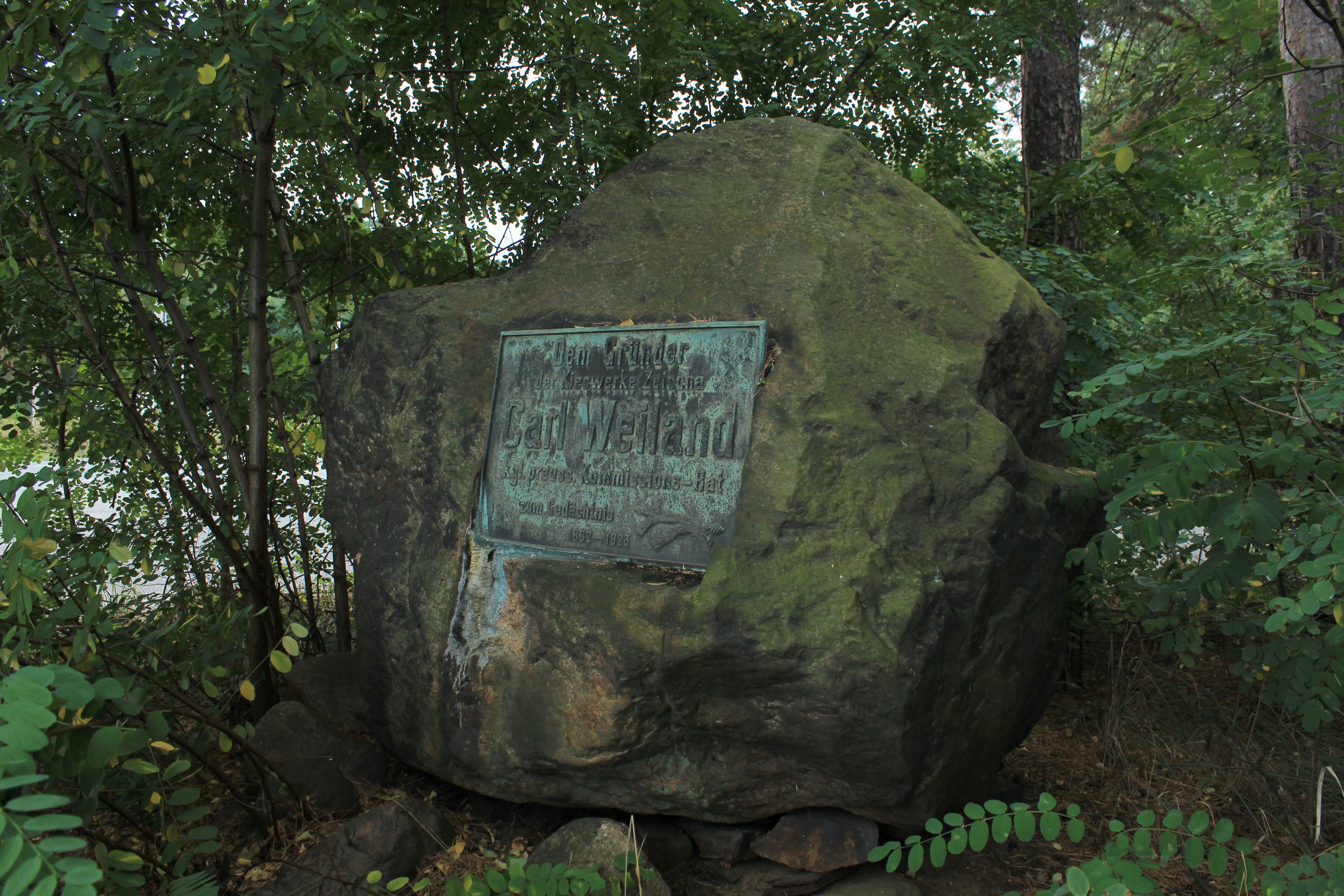
Weiland memorial

The grave of Elias Borßdorff, mayor of Liebenwerda, who was dragged to his death by Swedish troops near Zeischa during the Thirty Years' War, is a listed monument in the Zeischa cemetery. The memorial stone covering the grave with an inscription dates from 1878. Originally, the grave was covered by a 'simple gravestone', which was raised, renewed and inscribed in 1834 on the initiative of some citizens of Liebenwerda. Two years later, a teacher at the Liebenwerda girls' school, K.G. Kretzschmar, published the memorial "Denkworte zur Erinnerung des Borsdorffschen Denksteins". After decades of weathering had made the inscription on the stone almost illegible, the grave was renovated in 1878 with the help of master bricklayer Jost, sculptor Lauschke and master locksmith Franke, and surrounded by a small iron fence.

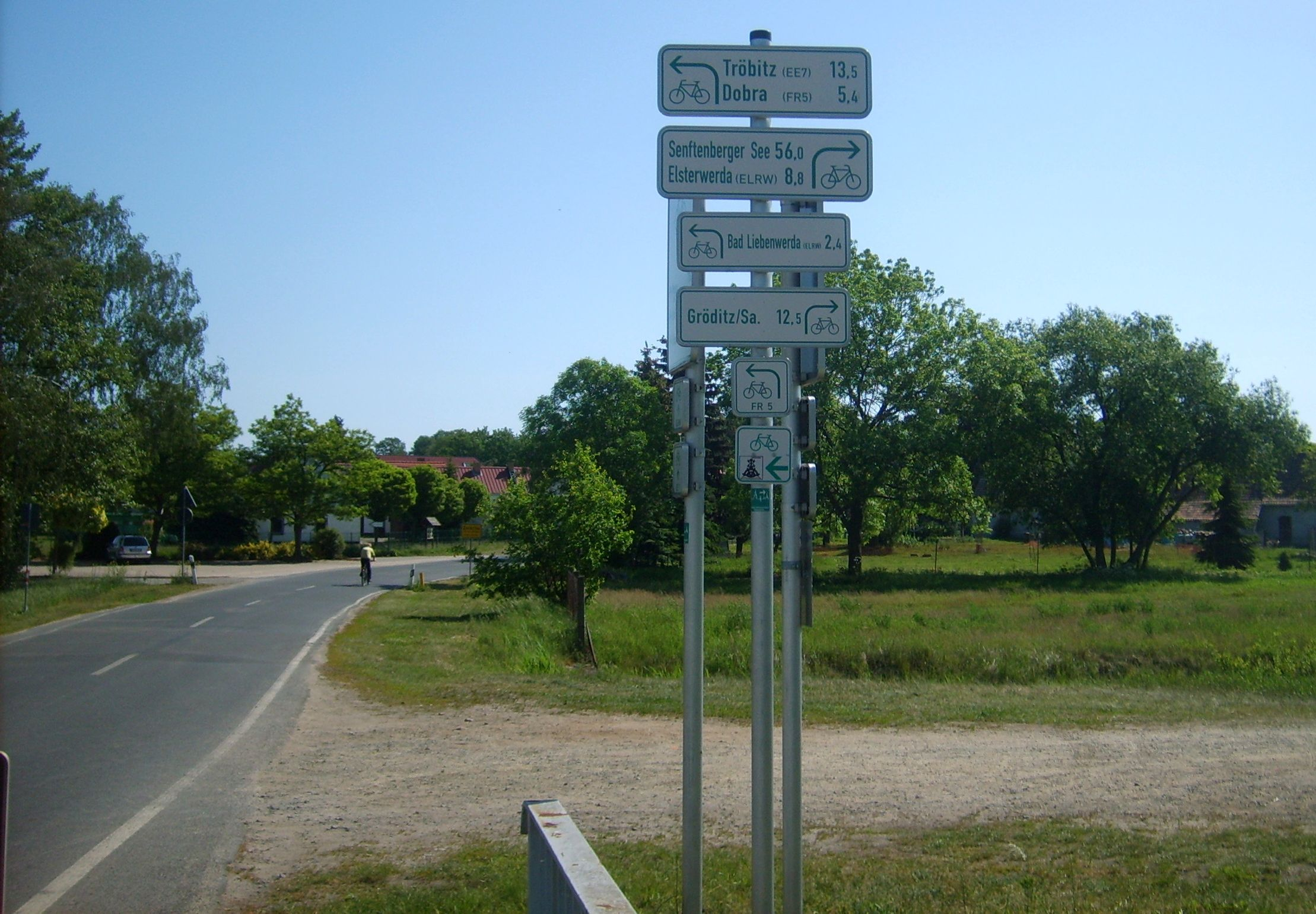
Signpost on the Black Elster

There is also a memorial in the cemetery to the inhabitants who died in the First World War. There are also two plaques at the entrance to the Memorial Hall with the names of those who died in the Second World War.

=== Tourist connections ===
Several paved cycle paths along the Black Elster connect Zeischa with Bad Liebenwerda, the surrounding Elbe-Elster region, the neighbouring Liebenwerda Heath to the north and other sights in the surrounding area. The Tour Brandenburg, Germany's longest long-distance cycle route at 1111 kilometres, passes by the village. Other cycle routes include the Fürst-Pückler Cycle Route, which was included in the project list of the International Building Exhibition Fürst-Pückler-Land under the motto "500 kilometres through time", and the 108-kilometre Black-Elster Cycle Route.

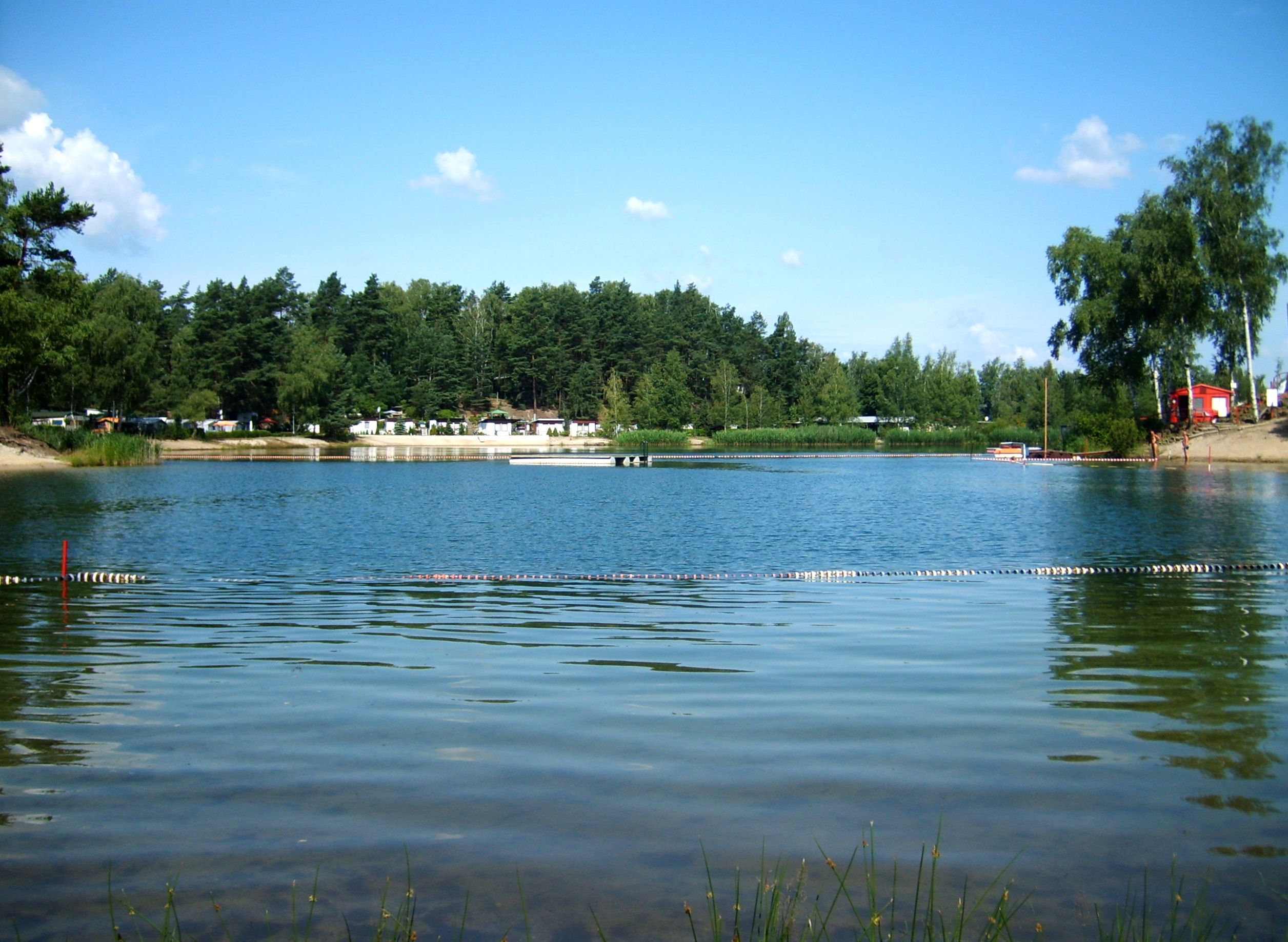
Waldbad Zeischa

The nearest boat moorings for the more recently developed water tourism on the Black Elster are located near the centre of Zeischa and about two kilometres upstream at river kilometre 64.5 in the area of the Elster bridge on state road 593. There are also hire stations for canoes and inflatable boats in Bad Liebenwerda. There are several places to stay in Zeischa itself. In addition to an inn in the town centre, several privately run guesthouses offer accommodation.

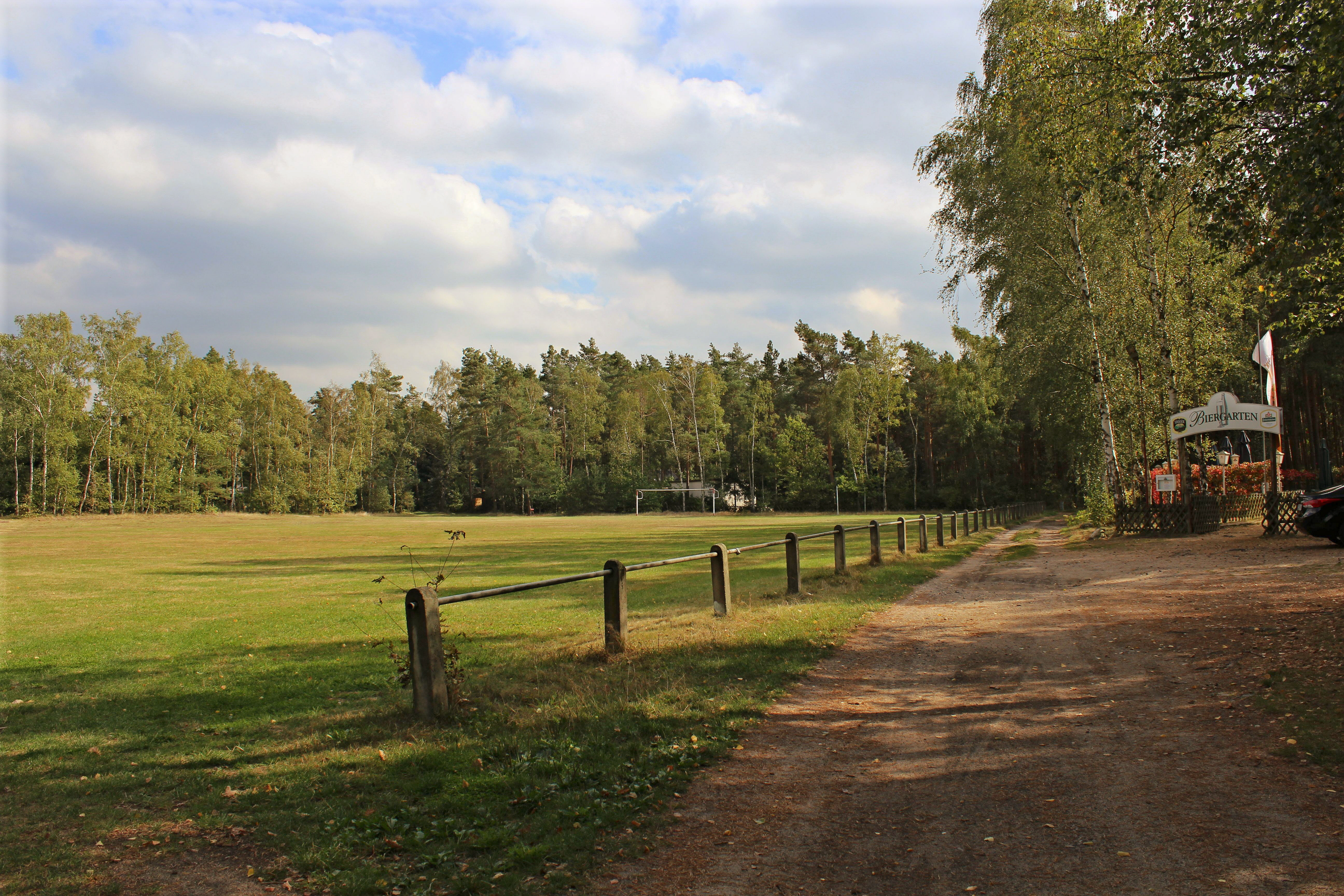
Sports field

To the north of the village is the local recreation area "Waldbad Zeischa", where you can also find a restaurant. Next to the three-hectare Waldbad is a seven-hectare campsite with 137 pitches and bungalows for rental. The area was originally part of the Zeischa gravel pit, which is still used for gravel extraction and has a water surface area of around eighty hectares. The area, which is still subject to mining regulations, is envisaged in Bad Liebenwerda's spa development plan as a future leisure and water sports centre, and the town council is currently working on a concept for tourism and nature-friendly after-use.

=== Regular events ===
The annual highlight in the village is the Waldbadfest on the second weekend in August each year. Other regular events in the village include the annual Easter bonfire on the grounds of the volunteer fire brigade, the village and children's festival in June, the Zeischa pub night, as well as the Saint Martin's procession on 11 November and the Christmas brass band music on the village green on Christmas Eve.

== Economy and infrastructure ==
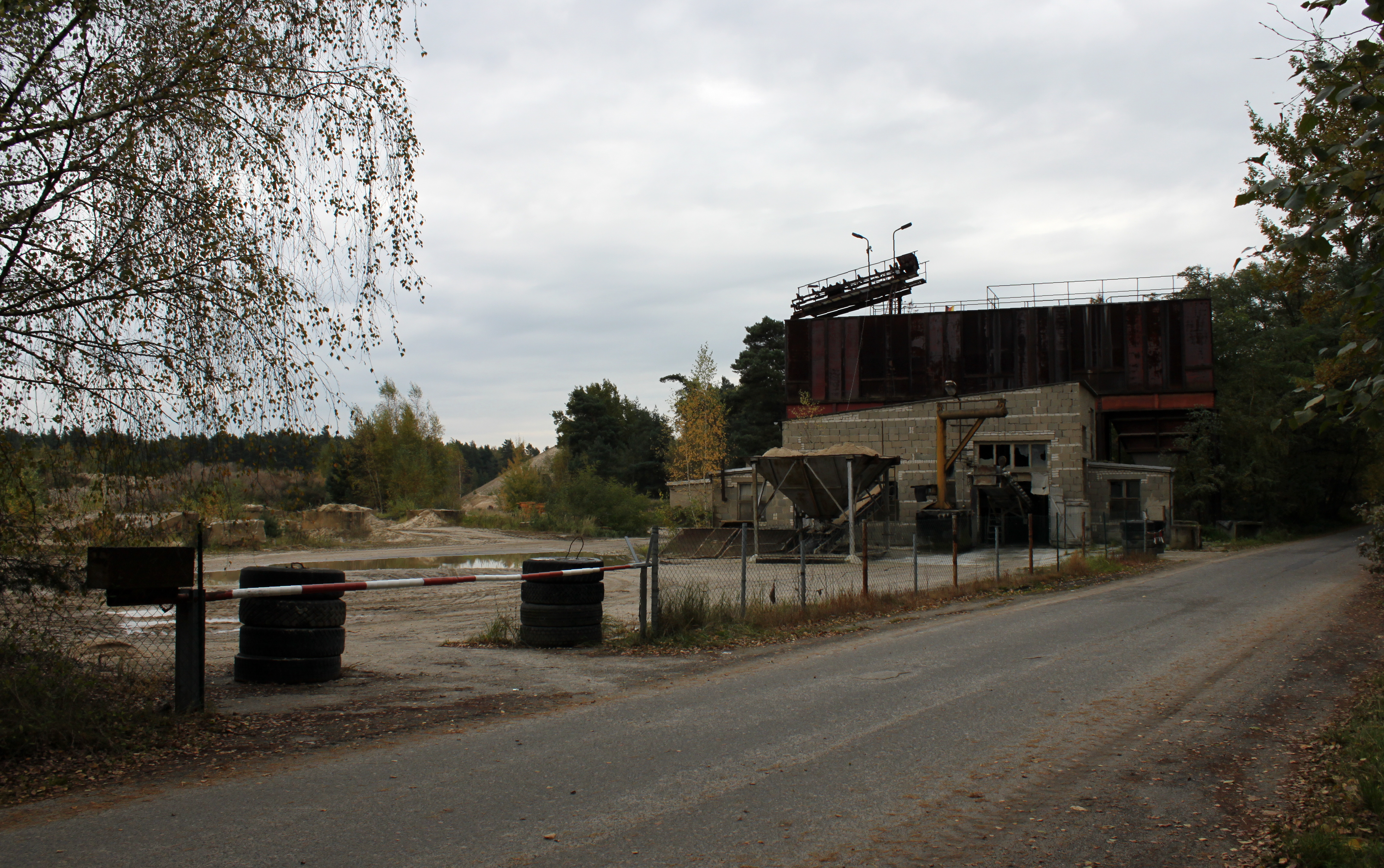
Gravel works

=== Economy and transport ===
Zeischa is located south of the B101 federal road on the Węgliniec-Roßlau railway line. District road 6210 runs through the village, connecting it to the towns of Bad Liebenwerda and Elsterwerda. District road 6212 provides a southbound connection to state road 59 (Bad Liebenwerda - Ortrand) and the L 593 (Oschätzchen - B 101) runs along the eastern edge of the village.

Since the end of the 19th century, the village has been characterised above all by the numerous tree nurseries that were once located here and the gravel extraction in the north of the district.

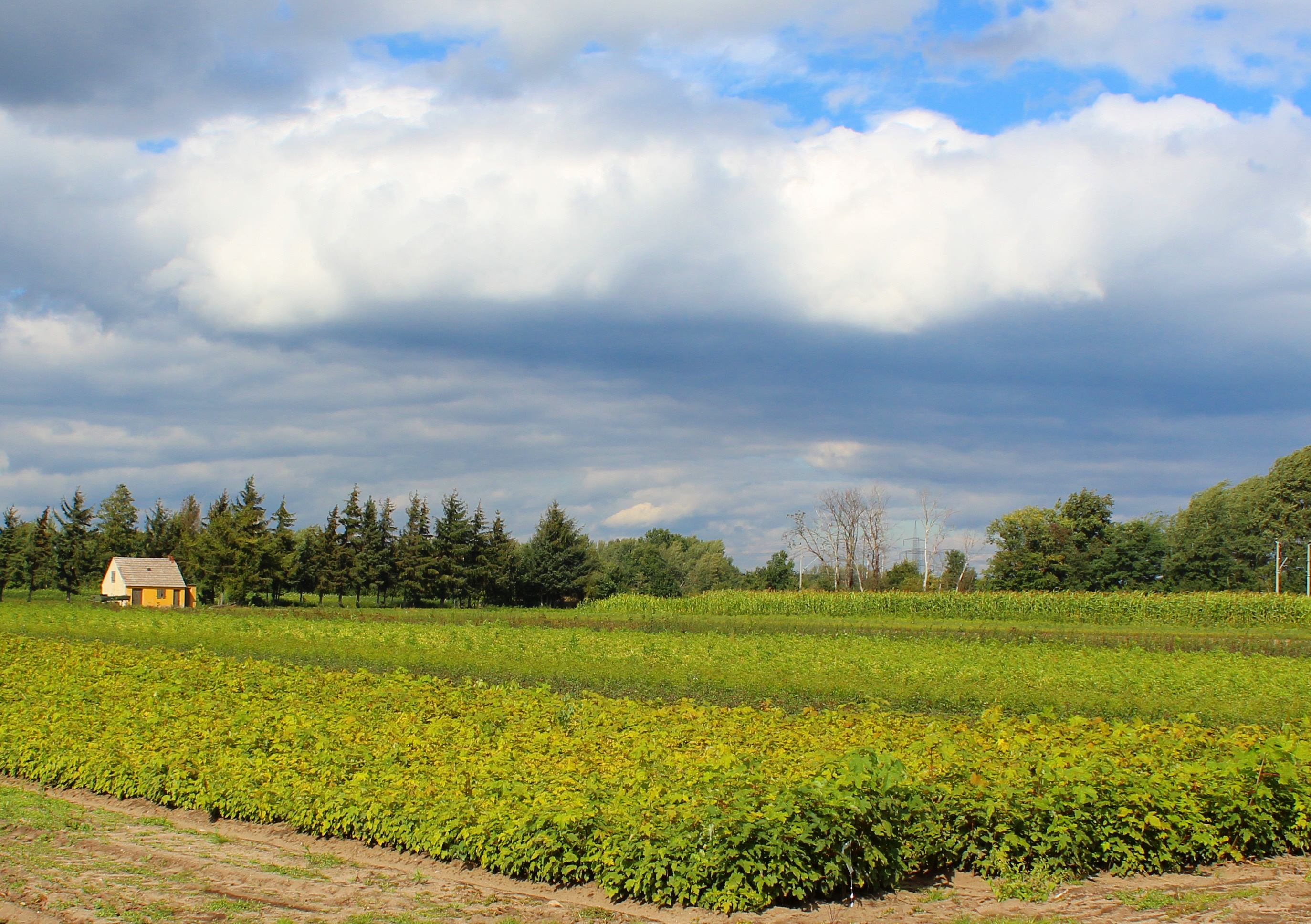
Nursery field in Zeischa

The area is currently home to a number of medium-sized agricultural, craft and service businesses. While gravel mining in Zeischa is gradually coming to an end and the resulting dredging pond will only be used for tourism in the future, the Zeischa meadows continue to be characterised by tree nurseries. The Fürst Pückler GmbH forest tree nursery, which emerged in 1991 from the "3rd Forestry Conference" Zeischa horticultural production cooperative founded in 1959, is based here. Another local company in the sector is the Graeff tree nursery. Its rose nursery produced the "Joe Polowsky Peace Rose" in honour of the American peace activist in 2007. There is also a building and garden centre on the site of the former GPG.

=== Education ===
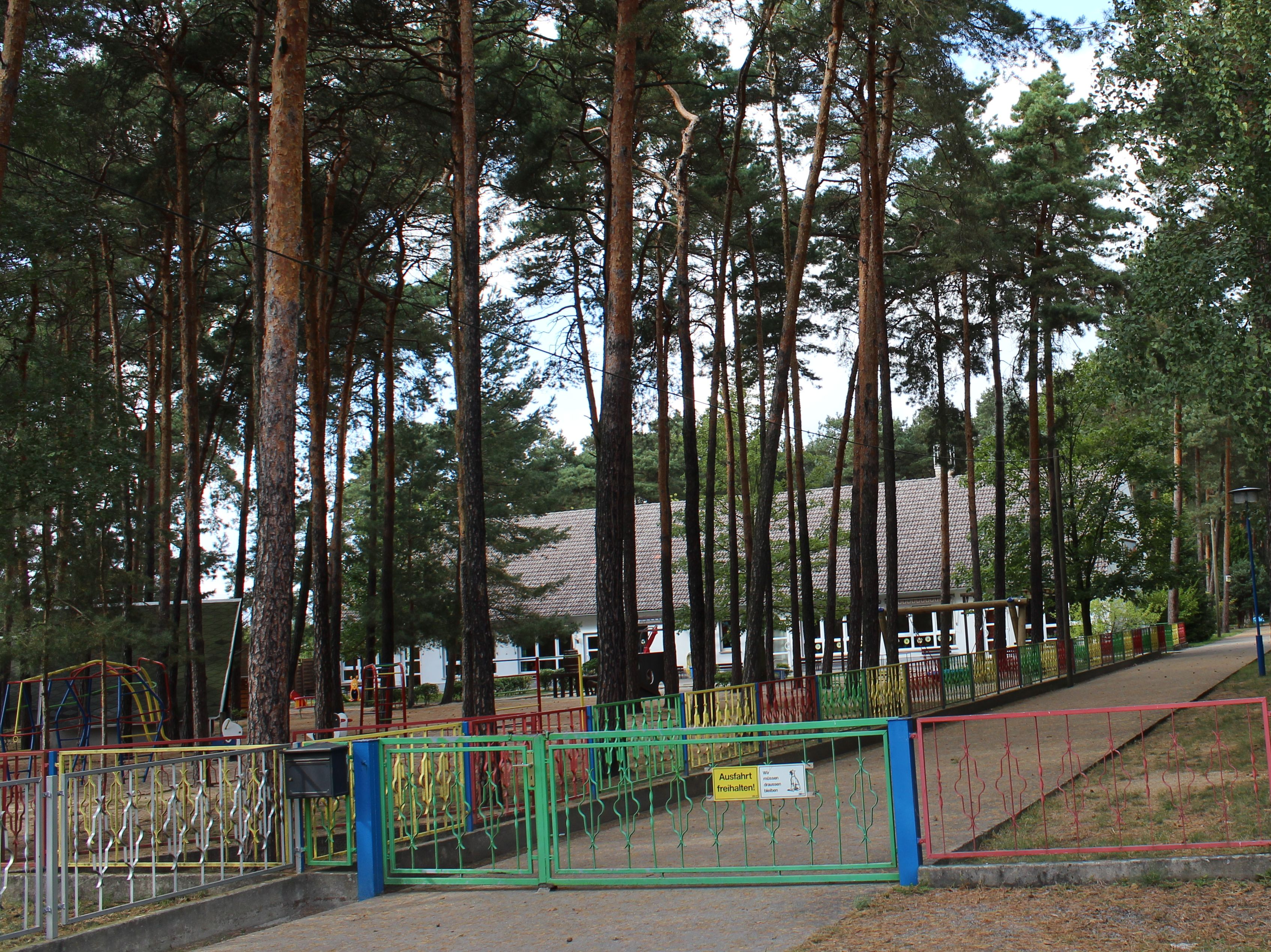
Pfiffikus day care centre

The Zeischa "Pfiffikus" day care centre in Bahnhofstraße, which emerged from the former Kinderkombination, is run by the town of Bad Liebenwerda and currently offers 70 childcare places. It has been working according to the Kneipp concept since 2004 and has therefore been certified several times as one of around three hundred kindergartens nationwide by the Kneipp Association, the umbrella organisation of around 600 Kneipp associations, and awarded the "Kneipp Seal of Quality".

The children in the district are currently enrolled at the Robert Reiss primary school centre in Bad Liebenwerda. The centre has the status of an all-day school. It was created in August 2006 through the merger of the primary schools in Bad Liebenwerda, Neuburxdorf and Zobersdorf, where the children from Zeischa were also enrolled up to that point.

There is also a secondary school in Bad Liebenwerda. The district adult education centre "Elbe-Elster" offers courses and other further education opportunities in the town. The Gebrüder Graun district music school has a branch in the town. There is also a municipal library, which offers library tours, literary events and readings by writers in addition to the usual lending facilities, which currently have around 21,000 items.
