= Zeischa village school =

School in Germany

Coordinates: 51°29′53″N 13°25′19″E

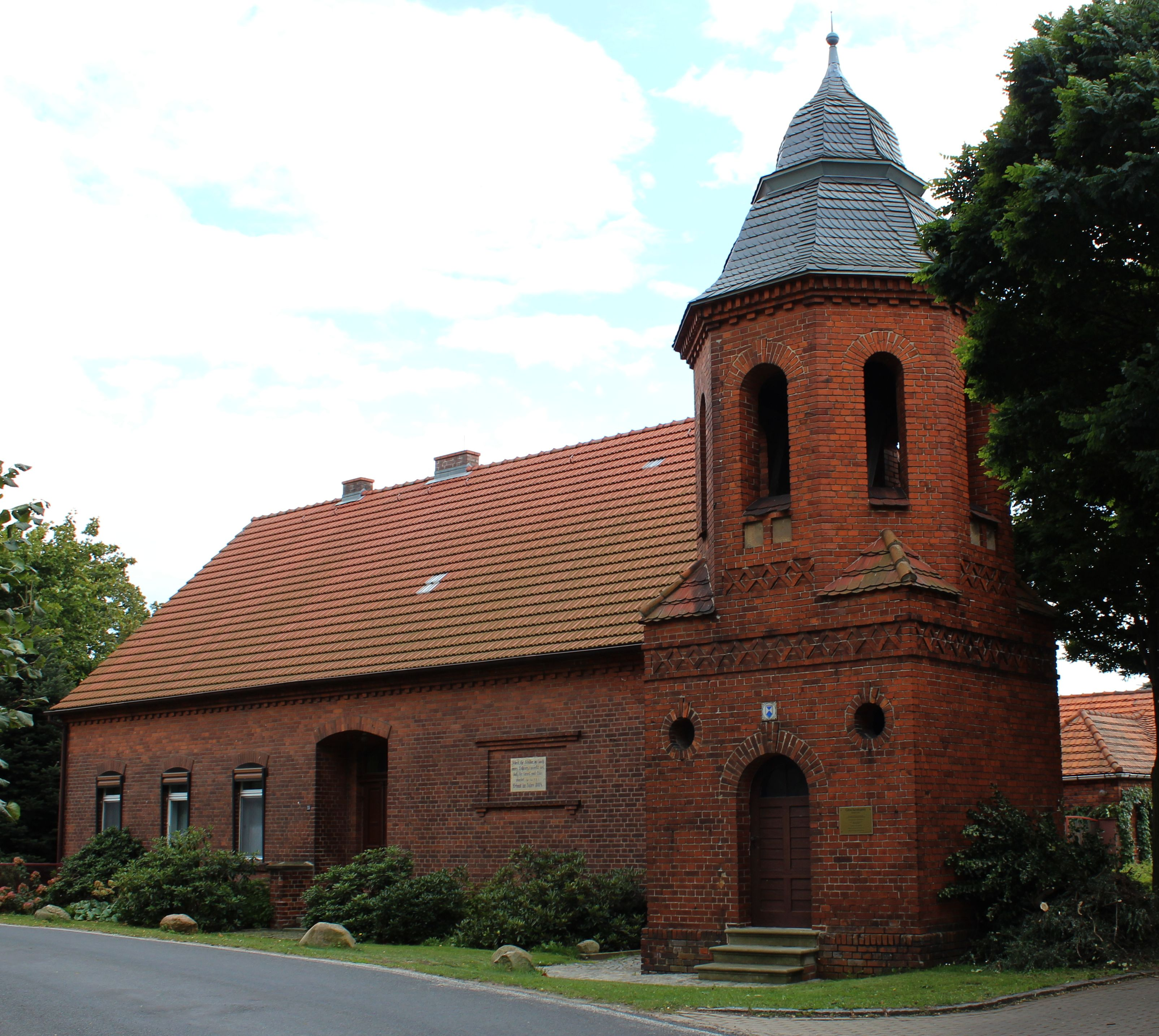
Former village school in Zeischa with bell tower

The Zeischa village school and its adjacent bell tower are located in the Zeischa district of the spa town of Bad Liebenwerda in the Elbe-Elster district of southern Brandenburg, Germany. Both brick buildings are listed as historic monuments and are the most prominent structures on Zeischa's historic village green.

== Building description and history ==
=== Previous buildings ===
In the early 19th century, Zeischa's children likely received their first school lessons in the local poorhouse and shepherd's house, a straw-covered building with folding doors shared with the parish shepherd. By 1826, due to inadequate conditions, the government mandated the construction of a new school. The municipality was required to fund most of the project, as government support was limited to 50 talers due to numerous similar initiatives. By 1829, after raising the necessary funds, the municipality submitted a design estimated at 338 talers, which was rejected by the royal master builder in Torgau for structural reasons. A revised design led to construction costing 441 talers, completed in 1829. The teacher's initial salary was 54 talers and 20 groschen annually, later increased to 84 talers and 20 groschen.

By 1851, rising costs prompted the government to demand a teacher's salary of 120 talers, which Zeischa could not sustain. From 1851 to 1861, the school was co-administered by a teacher from neighbouring Zobersdorf, after which it closed, and the building was sold. Children then attended school in Zobersdorf, crossing the Schwarze Elster river, which posed risks during floods. Some travelled via the Knight's estate in Prieschka, causing delays. On 6 December 1900, a six-year-old girl, daughter of tree nursery owner Reichenbach, drowned after falling into the river en route to school.

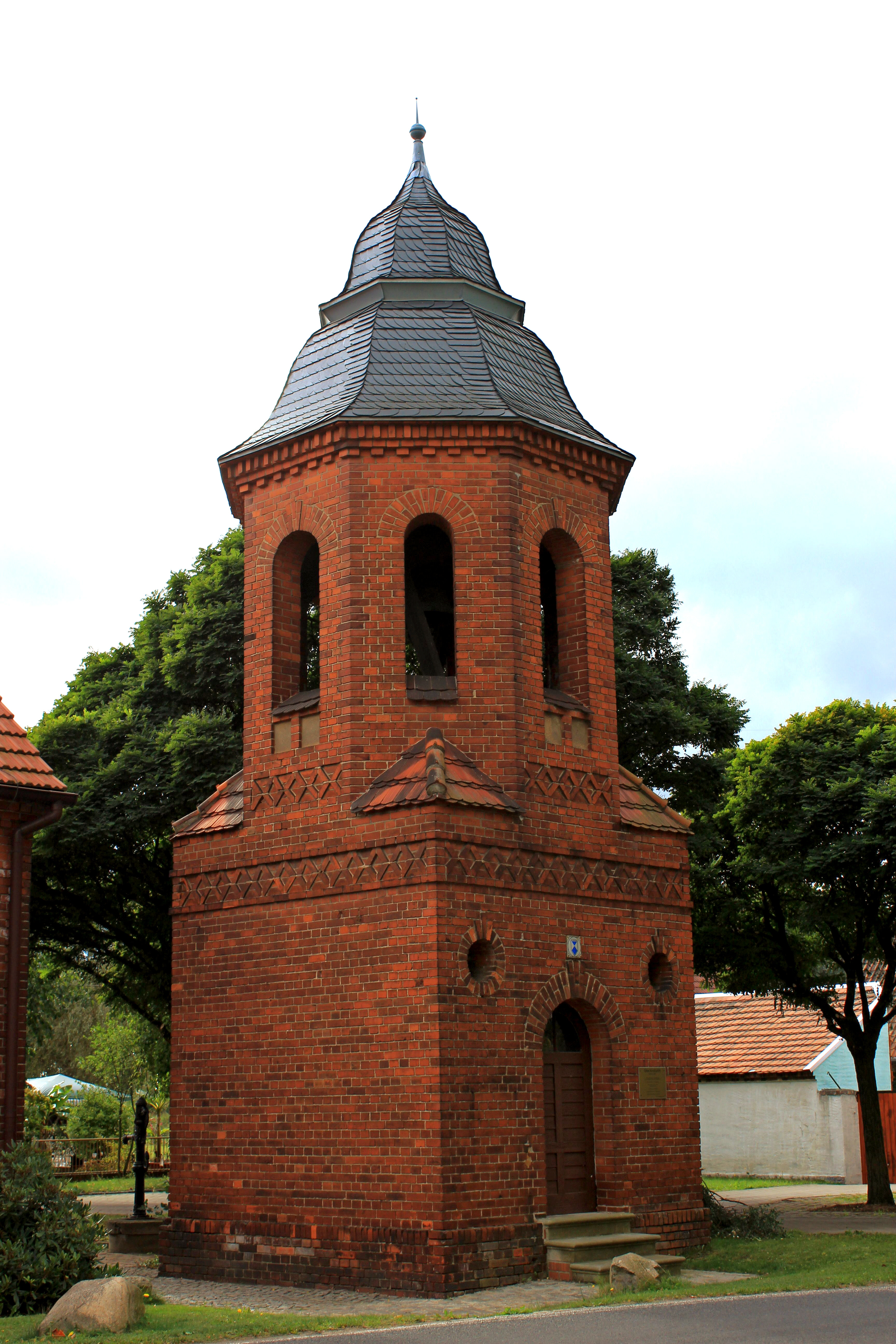
Bell tower (northwest view)

=== New school ===
Rising pupil numbers in Zeischa and Zobersdorf strained the Zobersdorf school's capacity. Negotiations for a new Zeischa school began but were halted in 1897 due to insufficient funds. After the 1900 drowning, negotiations resumed. Local entrepreneur Carl Weiland supported the project by lending construction costs, contributing 2,000 marks, and pledging 10 marks annually for employees’ children's school fees. With 9,550 marks in government subsidies, the new school was built and inaugurated on 27 November 1904, shortly after the new teacher arrived.

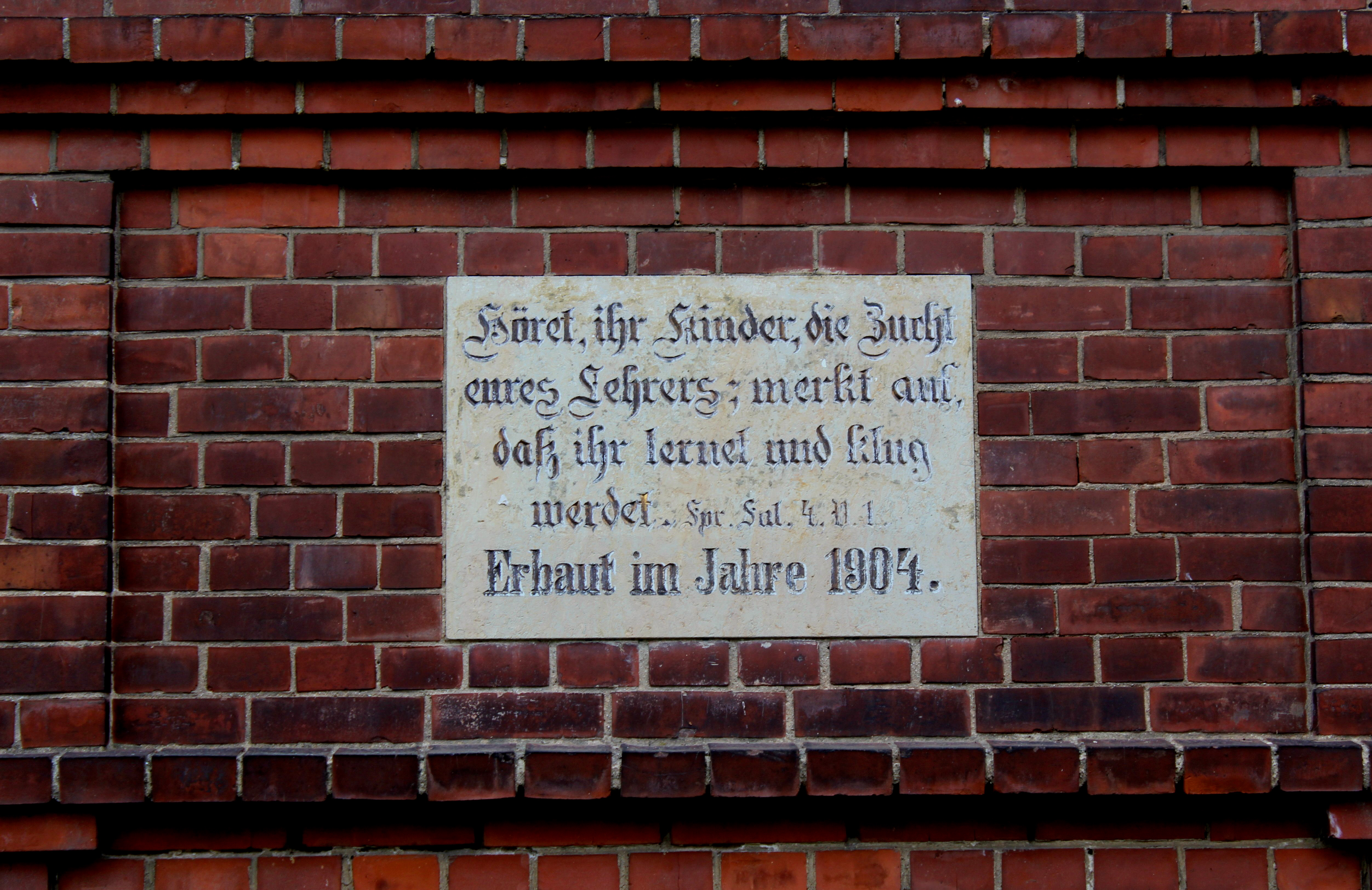
Commemorative plaque at the school

In 1907, a red-brick bell tower was erected beside the school. On 14 July 1907, a bell, cast in 1807 by the Heinrich August Weinhold bell foundry in Dresden and donated by Weiland, was consecrated. After Weiland's death, a memorial stone was erected near the railway crossing on Landesstraße 593, which remains today.

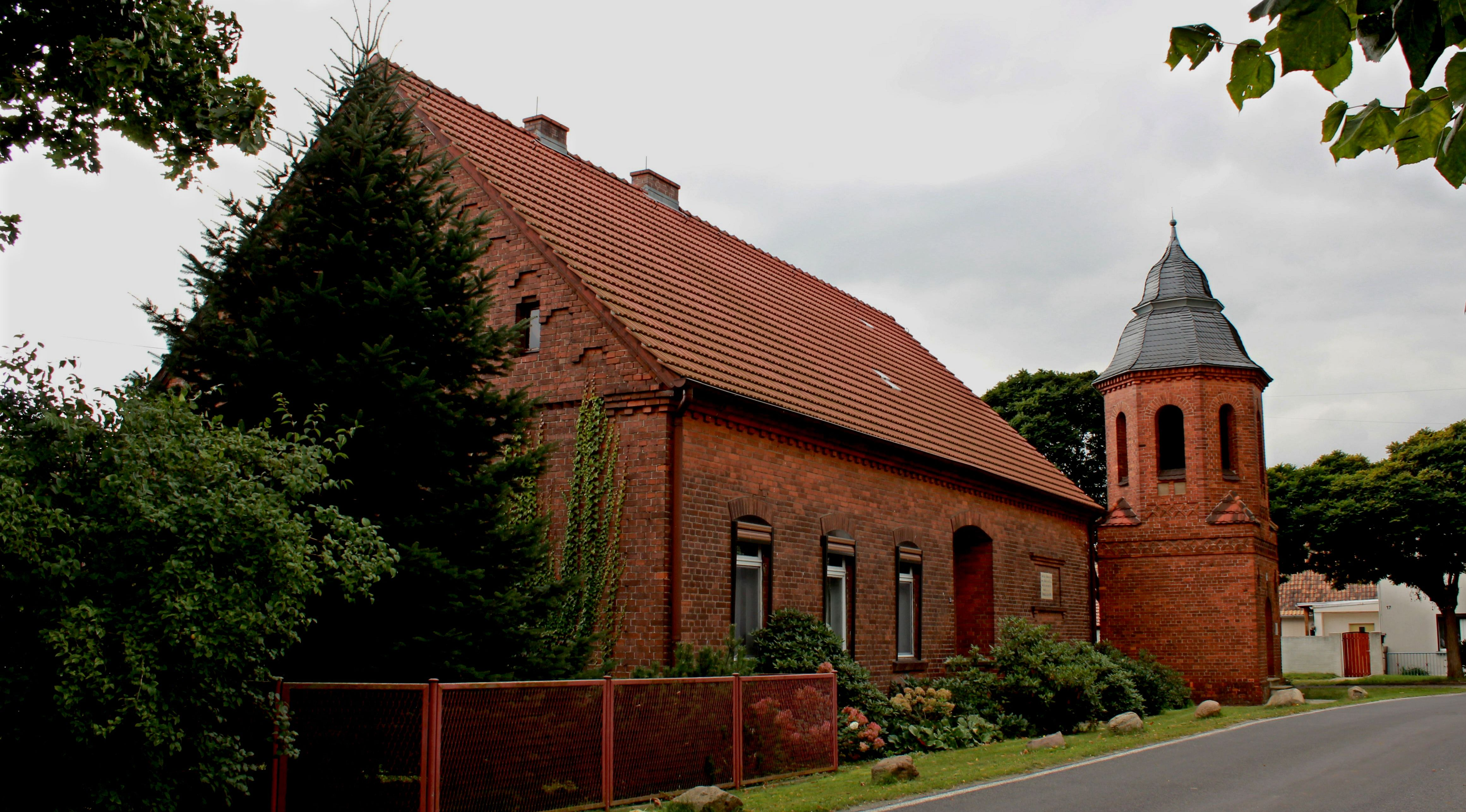
Northeast view

The Zeischa school closed in 1971, and students returned to Zobersdorf's school until its closure in 2006. Since then, Zeischa children have attended the Robert Reiss municipal primary school in Bad Liebenwerda.
