= Thalberg, Bad Liebenwerda =

District of Bad Liebenwerda, Germany

Thalberg
- District

Population
  - Total: 564
- Postal code: 04924
- Area code: 035341

Thalberg is a district of the town of Bad Liebenwerda in the Elbe-Elster district of Brandenburg, located approximately six kilometres northeast of the town in the Niederlausitzer Heidelandschaft Nature Park.

Until 1993, Thalberg was an independent municipality in the district of Bad Liebenwerda. The officially designated residential area of Knissen belongs to Thalberg.

== History ==
The first documented mention of Thalberg dates to 1235. At that time, Thalberg likely belonged to Harigsburg near Zeischa. Knissen is mentioned in 1243 as daz dorff knuessyn.

Until the Reformation, the pilgrimage route (Pilarum) between Knissen and Theisa held particular significance. Pilgrims from Brandenburg travelled along it to Liebenwerda to visit the Chapel of the Holy Cross. After 1980, the section of the pilgrimage route between the former Goldfisch restaurant in Knissen (last used as part of the Elsterwerda doll factory, now a workshop) and Thalberger Schulstraße was ploughed up.

Around 1530, the Maasdorf Ponds (Großer Teich, Kleiner Teich, Pfuhlteich) were created through corvée labour. They are still used for fish farming today.

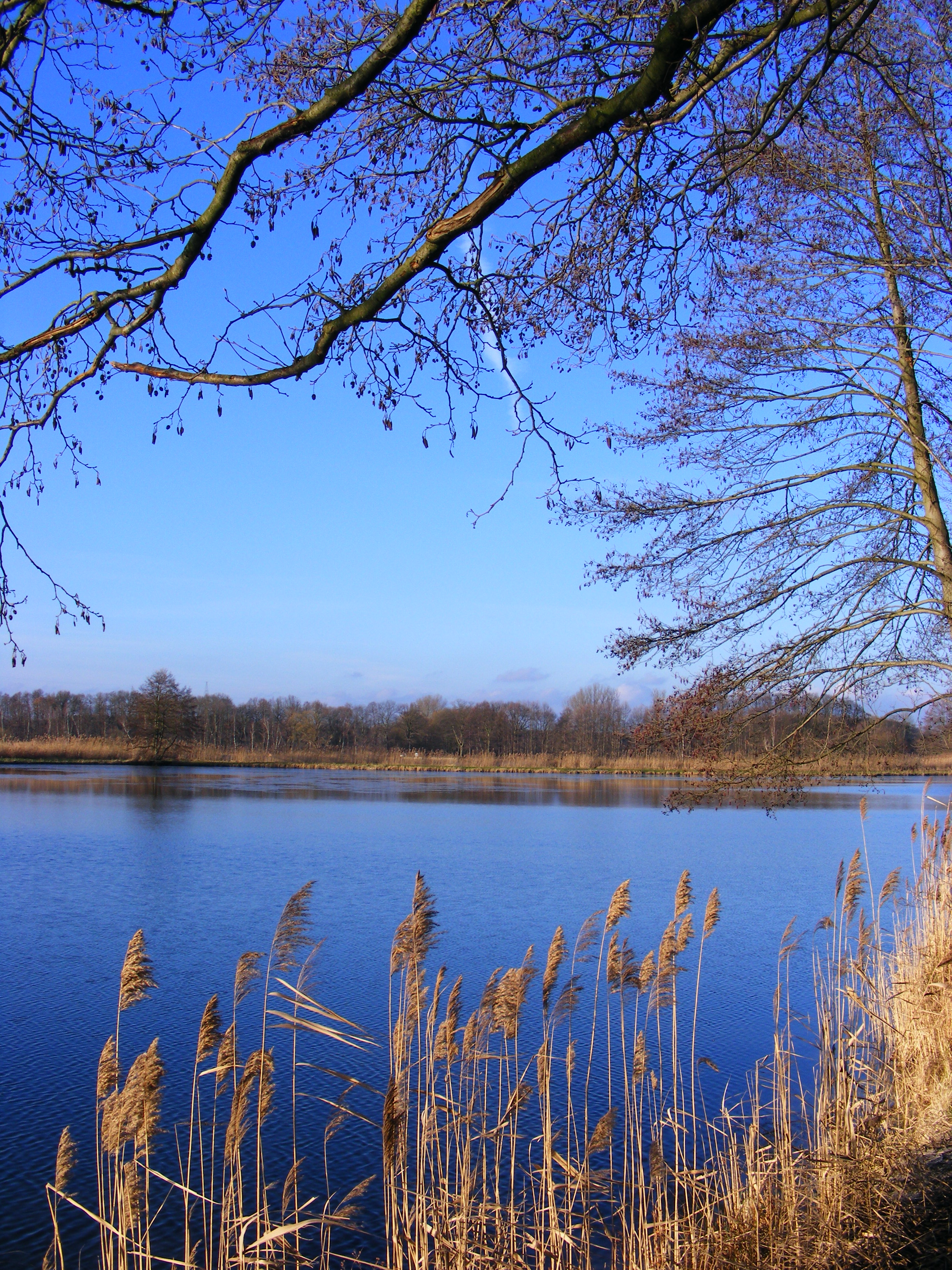
Maasdorf ponds

Thalberg later fell victim to power struggles between supporters of the Dobrilugk monastery and the Ileburgers and their followers, lying desolate at least since the Thirty Years' War, during which places such as Theisa were plundered and burned.

In 1785, Thalberg was repopulated as a colony from Theisa, but apart from the village itself, it no longer had farmland. The magistrate Schulze from Liebenwerda, who founded the village, had 16 houses built on his manor in Theisa and settled over 40 families on the wasteland. In 1787, the ponds were leased to Maasdorf for nine years. In 1796, they were sold privately for the first time and later named Mittelhäuser Teiche after one of their owners. In 1835, Thalberg had 34 houses with 215 inhabitants, 19 cattle, 27 goats, and 6 pigs. From 1875, Knissen belonged to Maasdorf.

The sports club Wacker 21 was founded in 1921. The Thalberg war memorial was inaugurated in 1929. In 1936, Thalberg was reassigned to Knissen and its farmland, regaining its municipal boundaries and becoming an independent municipality.

Ten men from Thalberg and 17 from Knissen died in the First World War, and 27 people from both districts died in the Second World War.

The LPG Type 1 was founded in 1952. The cultural centre and municipal office were built between 1960 and 1961. The school and sports hall were constructed and inaugurated in 1963.

On 6 December 1993, Thalberg was incorporated into the town of Bad Liebenwerda.

The Thalberger bell tower was inaugurated in 2005. The school (most recently a secondary school) closed in 2006, and its buildings have remained vacant ever since, with no solution in sight.

== Festivals and events ==
The annual highlight is the Thalberg Horse and Farmers' Market, held every August. The first series took place from 1984 to 1987. After 1987, authorities prohibited the continuation of the event series without providing public reasons. A revival was only possible after the end of the GDR. Since the turn of the millennium, the Horse and Farmers' Market has faced declining interest from exhibitors and visitors.

== Bibliography ==
- Eckelmann, Wolfgang; Ziehlke, Michael (2007). Chronik der Stadt Liebenwerda [Chronicle of the town of Liebenwerda] (in German). Published by Verein für Stadtmarketing und Wirtschaft Bad Liebenwerda e.V. Bad Liebenwerda: Winklerdruck. pp. 268–269. OCLC 830969843.
