= Waldbad Zeischa =

Public recreational area in Bad Liebenwerda, Germany

Coordinates: 51°30′09″N 13°27′02″E

The Recreational Area Waldbad Zeischa or Naherholungsgebiet Waldbad Zeischa is located in the east of the southern Brandenburg spa town of Bad Liebenwerda, between the districts of Dobra and Zeischa, on the B 101. The centre of the area, which is still governed by mining law, is a gravel pit covering around 80 hectares.

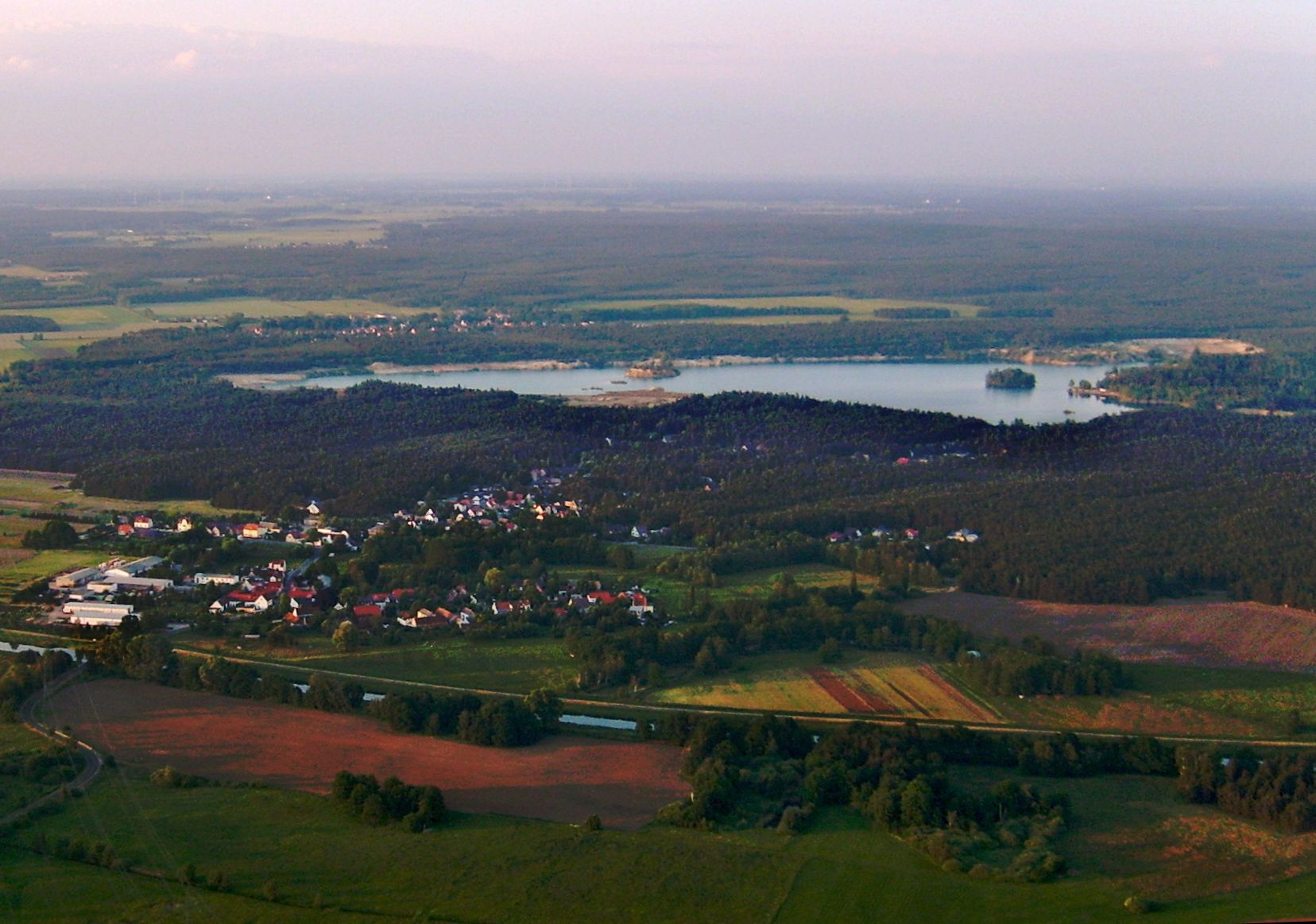
Bird's eye view from the south-east of Zeischa and the local recreational area to the north of the village.

== History ==
=== Gravel pit ===
In 1888, the Liebenwerda merchant and manufacturer Carl Weiland began mining gravel and sand to the northeast of Zeischa. The raw materials were initially extracted manually. As production increased, bucket-chain excavators were also used in the pit. Transport from the pit was carried out using a light railway.

Initially, Weiland's main focus was on road construction, and the progressing railway construction also brought increasing sales. The company soon established its own hard stone works, and the Zeischa gravel proved to be very high-quality concrete gravel even without extensive processing.

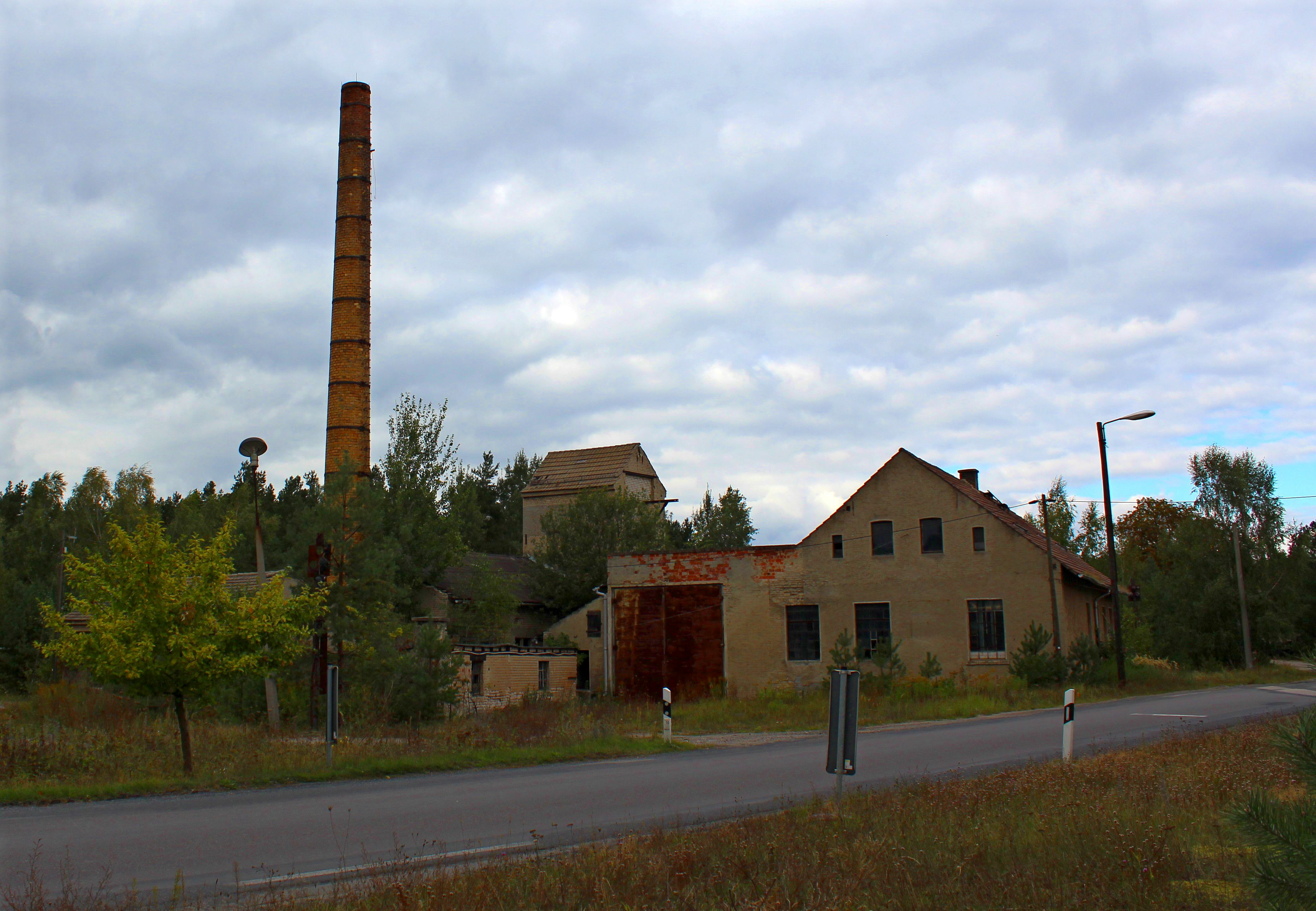
Former premises of the Weiland company on the state road 593.

Later, the company was given a small loading station and a connecting track to the Węgliniec-Falkenberg/Elster railway line, which also used land in the Haida area and was also served by the local gravel pit via a 1.5-kilometre-long light railway at times. Around 1900, the estate was divided into two lines. One was the so-called Liebenwerda gravel line with the gravel pit in Zeischa, and the other was the line of the manor in Maasdorf under Paul Weiland, with quarries in Schwarzkollm and Kamenz.

The property of the Maasdorf manor was finally divided up in 1945 as part of the land reform, except for the Schwarzkollm quarry, which only became state property in 1973. The Zeischa family estate also became public property. It could only be bought back by the heirs after the German reunification.

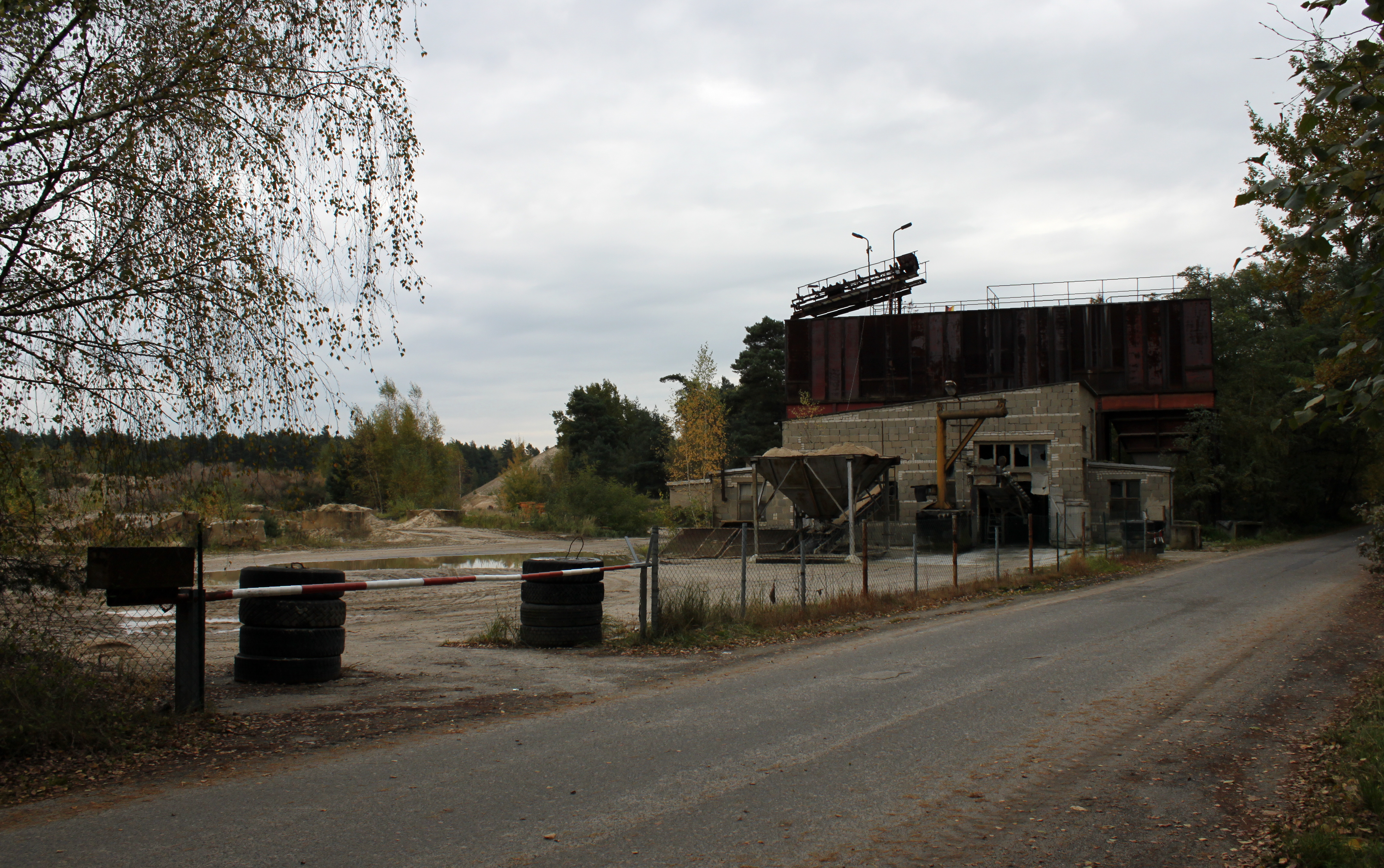
Gravel plant

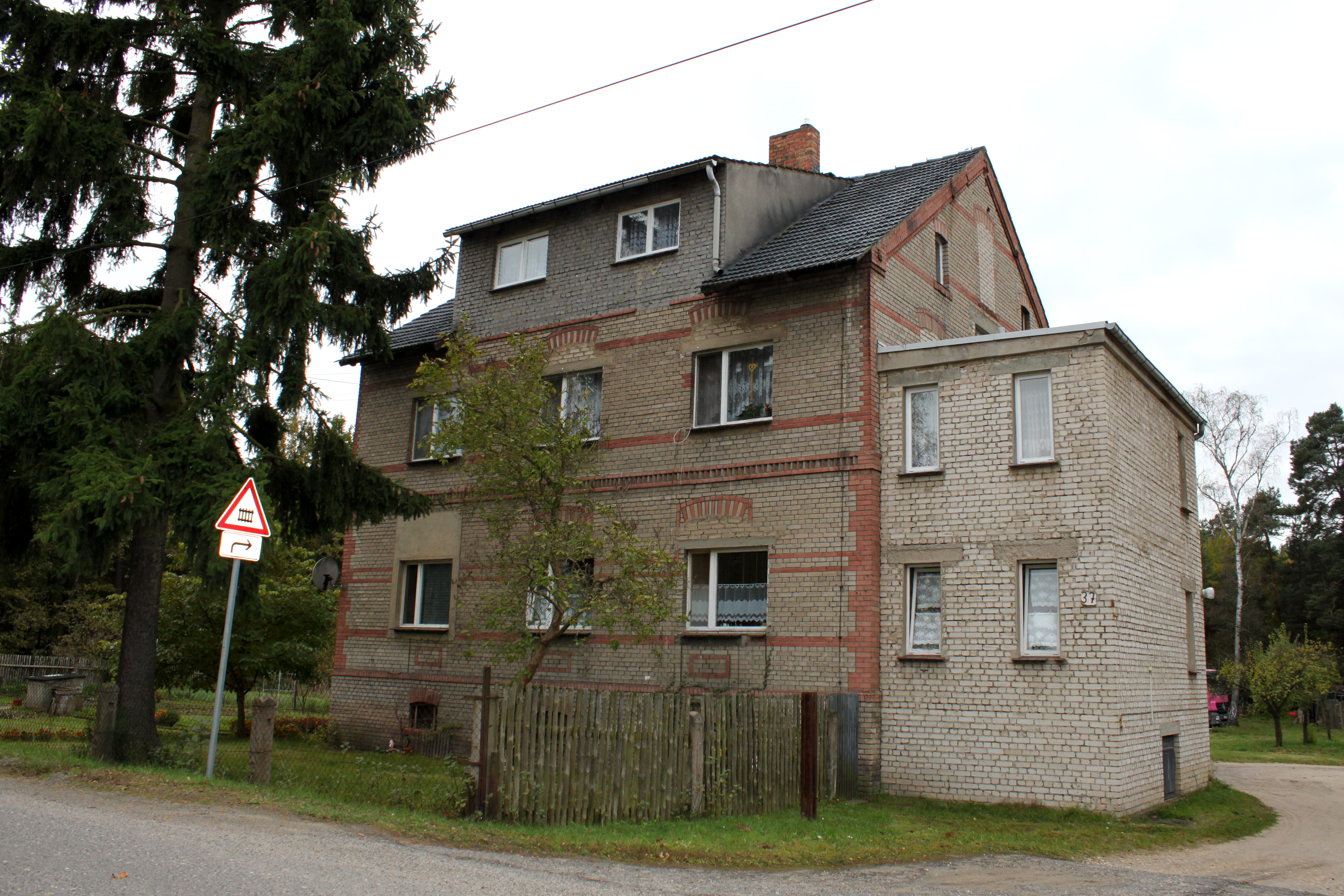
Former canteen of the hard stone works.

As construction activity in the new federal states increased with the reunification, so did the demand for gravel and sand from Zeischa. The western bank of the gravel pit, where raw materials have been extracted since 1970 using dredgers and, following an expansion of the gravel extraction field in 1984, also using pushers and barges, was at that time still bordered by the Zeischa–Dobra local road. In the period that followed, the pit expanded rapidly, so that the local connection to Dobra was soon severed. The gravel was transported to the plant via kilometres of conveyor belts, some of which were mounted on pontoons in the lake.

The Zeischa gravel pit changed operators in 2002, and due to the massive slump in sales in recent years, some of the facilities have since had to be dismantled.

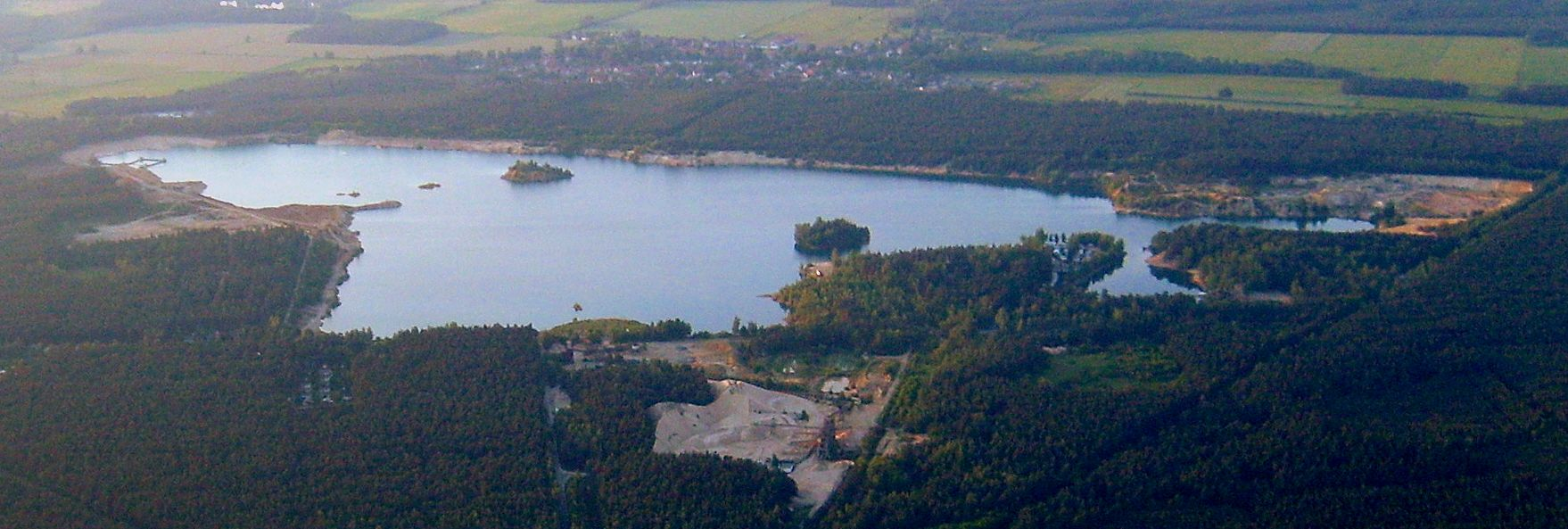
Zeischa Gravel Pit

=== Recreational Area Waldbad Zeischa ===
The Waldbad Zeischa, which covers around three hectares and is located in a bay in the south-east of the pit, is a public outdoor pool and part of the gravel pit in Zeischa. In addition to a guarded car park and a restaurant, there is also a campsite with 140 pitches and bungalows for rent.

Long before the area was designated as a recreational area, the inhabitants of the neighbourhood used the pit, which filled with water early on, for bathing and swimming. In 1964, the first bungalow estate was finally built in Zeischa. The Waldbad opened in 1970, and the area was designated as a local recreational area. A special-purpose association was founded to operate the site, to which the then-district town of Bad Liebenwerda and the municipalities of Dobra, Prieschka, Zeischa, and Zobersdorf belonged. In addition to a lifeguard house, the facilities included a diving tower, boat hire, a mini-golf course, two bowling alleys, and an open-air stage. The building that is now the "Zum Waldbad" restaurant was also built. This initially provided space for a snack bar and changing rooms. There was also an open-air cinema on the site in the summer. A holiday camp and a branch of Bad Liebenwerda's "Station Junger Naturforscher" were set up in the immediate vicinity of the Waldbad.

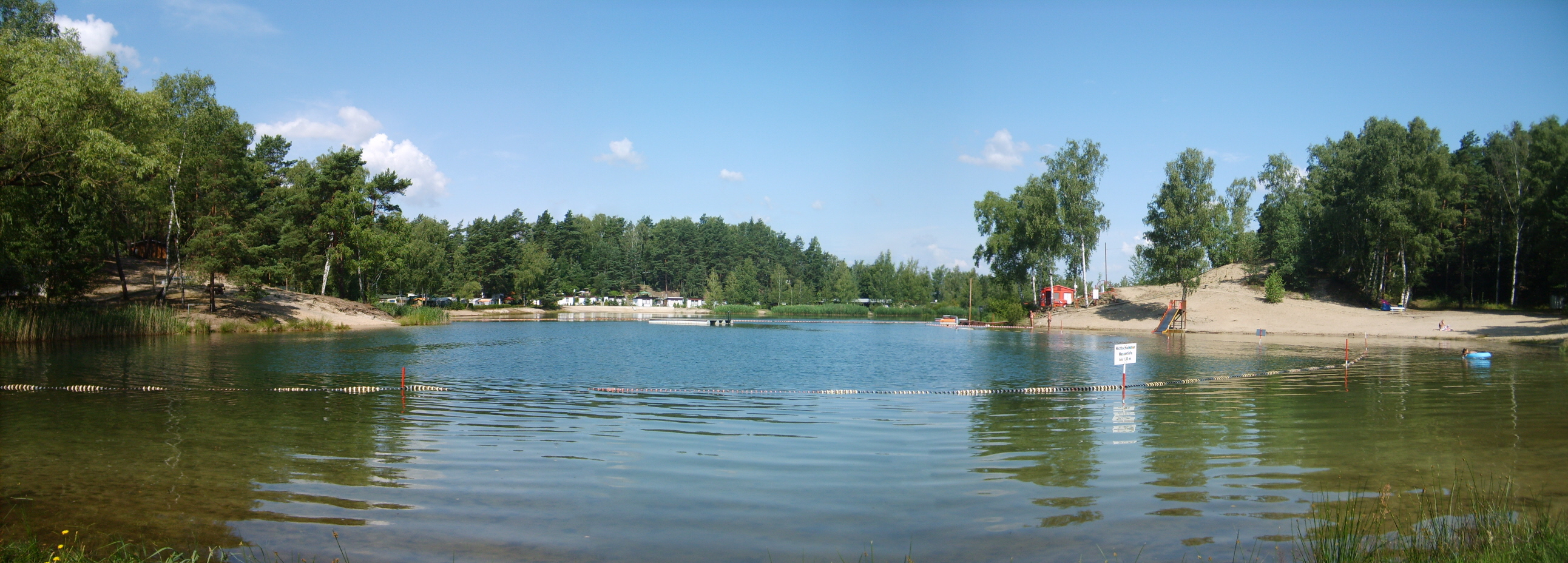
Waldbad Zeischa

== The future ==
As the end of mining in Zeischa is now in sight, a concept for the tourist and nature-friendly subsequent use of the entire area is currently being drawn up on behalf of the town council. The area, which is still under mining law, is envisaged as a future recreational and water sports centre in Bad Liebenwerda's spa development plan.

== See also ==
- Zeischa

== Bibliography ==
- Feldmann, Klaus (2011). "Das Weiße Gold von Zeischa" [The white gold of Zeischa] (in German). Verein für Stadtmarketing und Wirtschaft Bad Liebenwerda e.V. Elbe-Elster Fernsehen – via YouTube.
