= Saathain =

- Ortsteil of Röderland
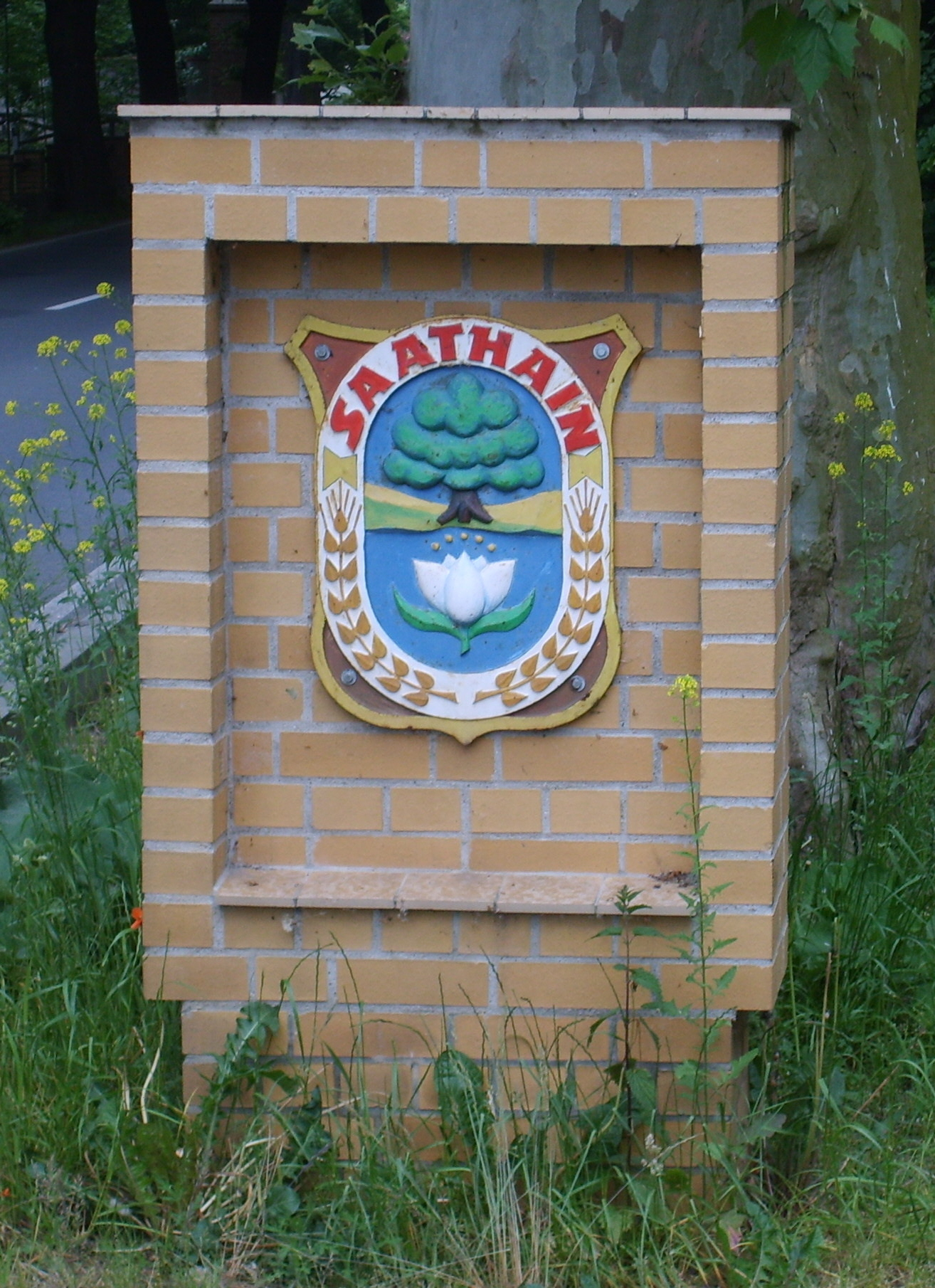
- Saathain's Coat of Arms

- Location within Germany
- Coordinates: 51°27′50″N 13°27′53″E
- Country: Germany
- Bundesland: Brandenburg
- District or Landkreis: Elbe-Elster
- Municipality: Röderland
- Elevation: 90 m (300 ft)

Population (2018)
  - Total: 486
- Time zone: UTC+1 (CET)
- Postal code: 04932
- Area code: 03533

Saathain, with a population of 516, is a Village (Ortsteil) of the municipality of Röderland in the Elbe-Elster district of southern Brandenburg. It is located next to the mouth of the Große Röder into the Black Elster, on the southern border of the Lower Lusatian Heath Nature Park.

The first documented mention of the village dates back to 1140 in a contract between Udo I. of Thuringia and Conrad, Margrave of Meissen. Due to the settlement of several puppeteer families in the 19th century, Saathain is considered the cradle of the Saxon traveling marionette theater. On October 26, 2003, Saathain and the surrounding villages of Haida, Reichenhain, Stolzenhain, Wainsdorf, Würdenhain and the municipality's future seat of government, Prösen, formed the municipality of Röderland. The former Saathain Castle is one of the cultural centers of the municipality and the district of Elbe-Elster, hosting numerous concerts and exhibitions. Today, the grounds include a rose garden with around 5,000 rose bushes, a 17th-century church (see: Gutskirche Saathain) and a summer café built on the foundations of Saathain Castle, which was destroyed in 1945.

== Geography ==
Saathain is located in the north of Röderland, about five kilometers southeast of Prösen, the municipality's seat of government. The Große Röder flows into the Black Elster about 1 Kilometer northwards of the center of Saathain. Overall, it is located at the southern border of the Lower Lusatian Heath Nature Park, which covers an area of 484 square kilometres (187 sq mi) 484 square kilometres in the districts of Elbe-Elster and Oberspreewald-Lausitz. The village is surrounded by Elsteraue II, one of the three subdivisions of the Elsteraue landscape conservation area (officially a Landschaftsschutzgebiet), which covers a total of around 6011 hectares. One of the conservation purposes of the landscape conservation area is "the preservation of the area due to its particular importance for natural recreation in the area of the spa town of Bad Liebenwerda."

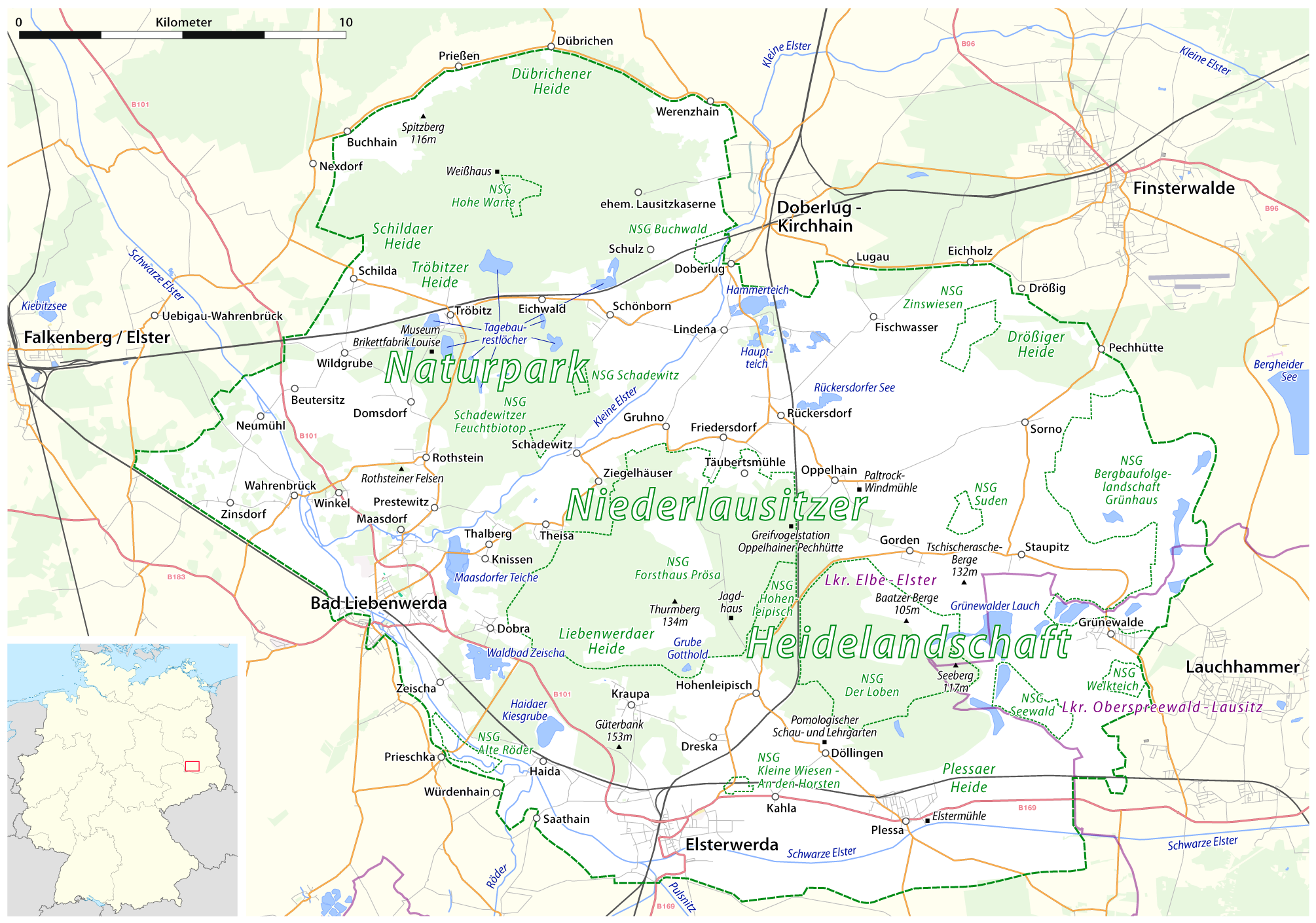
Map of the Lower Lusatian Heath Nature Park

=== Geology ===
Saathain is located in the Breslau-Magdeburg glacial valley (see also: Urstromtal), which reaches its narrowest point a few kilometers to the east in the lowlands of the Schraden region between Elsterwerda and Merzdorf at a width of seven kilometers before it swings to the northwest. Today's landscape is largely shaped by the penultimate ice age. A layer of sand and gravel several hundred meters thick covers the crystalline bedrock, which was created by the Variscan orogeny that took place in the Saxothuringian region.

=== Climate ===
With its humid climate, Saathain lies in the cool-temperate climate zone, although there is a noticeable transition to a continental climate. The nearest weather stations are located to the north-east in Doberlug-Kirchhain. Other relevant stations are in Torgau (30 kilometers to the west) and Oschatz (to the south-west).

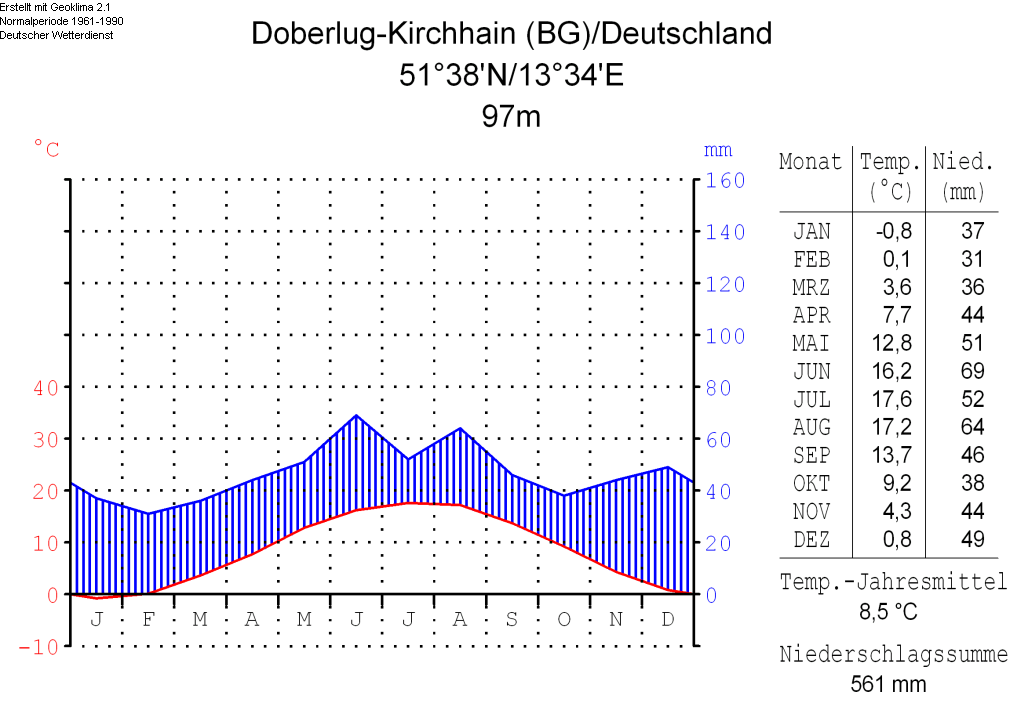
Climate chart of Doberlug-Kirchhain, around 20 kilometers north of Saathain. The month with the least precipitation is February, the month with the most precipitation is July. The average annual air temperature is 8.5 °C. The difference between the coldest month, January, and the warmest month, July, is 18.4 °C.

== History ==
=== Etymology and the first documented mention ===
The first documented mention of Saathain is found on a contract signed between Udo I. of Thuringia and Conrad, Margrave of Meissen in 1140, mentioning a castle (the Saathain Castle) named castrum Sathim. Later versions of the name were:

- 1197 (Uuernherus de) Satem
- 1199, 1210, 1221/22 (Wernerus de) Satem, Satim
- 1261 (Thymo de) Sathem
- 1285 Sathim
- 1289 Saten
- 1244, 1328 Satyn
- 1353 zcu dem Saten
- 1384 Sathan
- 1397 Sathen
- 1419 Sathan
- 1542 uffm Sattan
- 1555 Sathaynn, Sathan, Sahann
- 1575 Sathayn
- The current form of the name is only official since 1843.

It is possible that the castrum Sathim was built on a Slavic settlement or fortifiation and the name comes from the Slavic word Zatyme, meaning "Place behind the swamp" or the Upper Sorbian tymjo or tymjenja for Swamp or River Source. Another theory suggests that the name derived from the root of the word "Seed" in the Eastphalian Language, possibly referring to seeds, the sowing, the harvested grain, or also the land overgrown with grain, the seed field or a piece of seed land. Other fortifications in the region, such as in Wahrenbrück, Würdenhain, Liebenwerda and Elsterwerda, have German names, hence suggesting a Middle Low German (from Sāt, sate) or Middle High German (from sāze) Etymology, in both cases meaning (quiet, peaceful) place of settlement/residence.

=== From the late Middle Ages to the Electoral Saxon Peasants' Revolt ===
Saathain had one of the oldest weir systems on the Black Elster. The castle served to secure the river crossing at the nearby confluence of the Große Röder (which also defined the border to the neighboring Gau Nizizi), and also to protect and control the military and trade routes running parallel to the Black Elster. Only about one kilometer downstream, on the opposite side of the river mouth, was the Castle of Würdenhain, which was destroyed in 1442.

In addition to the Saathain village, the lordship of Saathain also included the villages of Stolzenhain (is today another part of Röderland), Mühldorf (which was, in 1935, incorporated into Kröbeln, which itself was incorporated into Bad Liebenwerda in 1996) and the original villages of Gröditz, Reppis, Schweinfurth, with their original territory, before they were incorporated into the now bigger municipality of Gröditz that exists today. The castle belonged to the Bishopric of Naumburg-Zeitz as an imperial fief until the middle of the 14th century. In 1274, Bishop Meinher von Neuenburg granted Saathain Castle to Henry the Illustrious for life. Two years later, the enfeoffment was extended to Henry's son Friedrich der Kleine (lit. 'Friedrich the Small') and his descendants.

The noble family of Köckritz settled in Saathain from 1348. They remained in Saathain until 1475 and were followed by the Schleinitz family. At this time, the Meissen also owned the manor of Mückenberg (today incorporated into Lauchhammer as Lauchhammer-West), about twenty kilometers to the east, which was connected to Saathain via the so-called Schleinitzweg. The Meissen remained resident there until 1716 and later became extinct with the death of Hermann Otto von Schleinitz in 1891. In 1716, the Electoral Saxon Hofmarschall Woldemar von Löwendal, who had once come to Saxony under the influence of Countess Anna Constantia von Brockdorff and who had already acquired the neighboring manor of Elsterwerda to the east in 1708, acquired the manors of Saathain and Mückenberg. In 1777, Saathain came into the sole possession of the Saxon cabinet minister Detlev Carl von Einsiedel. His father Johann George von Einsiedel had acquired it from the widow Löwendal in 1748.

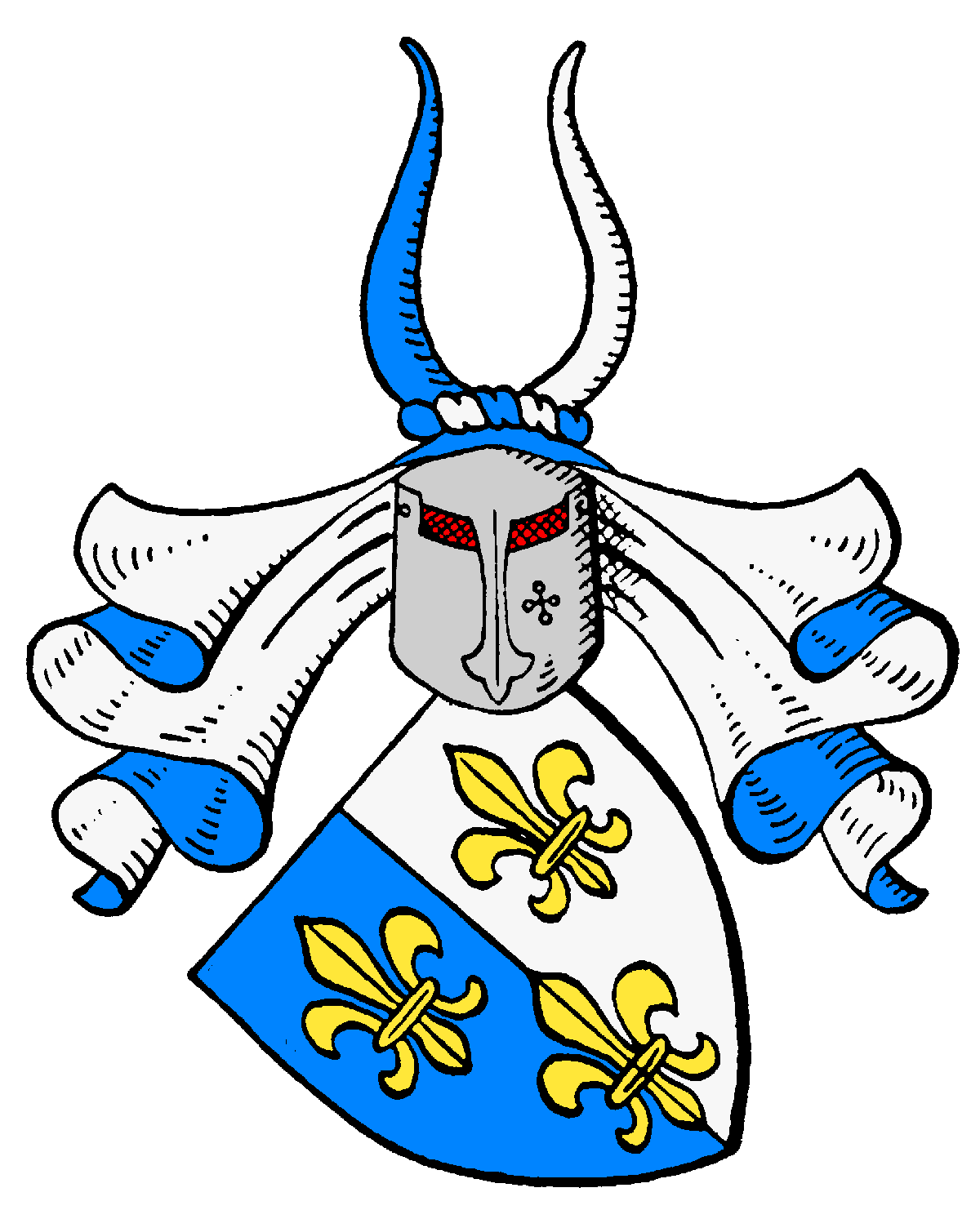
The Köckritz' coat of arms

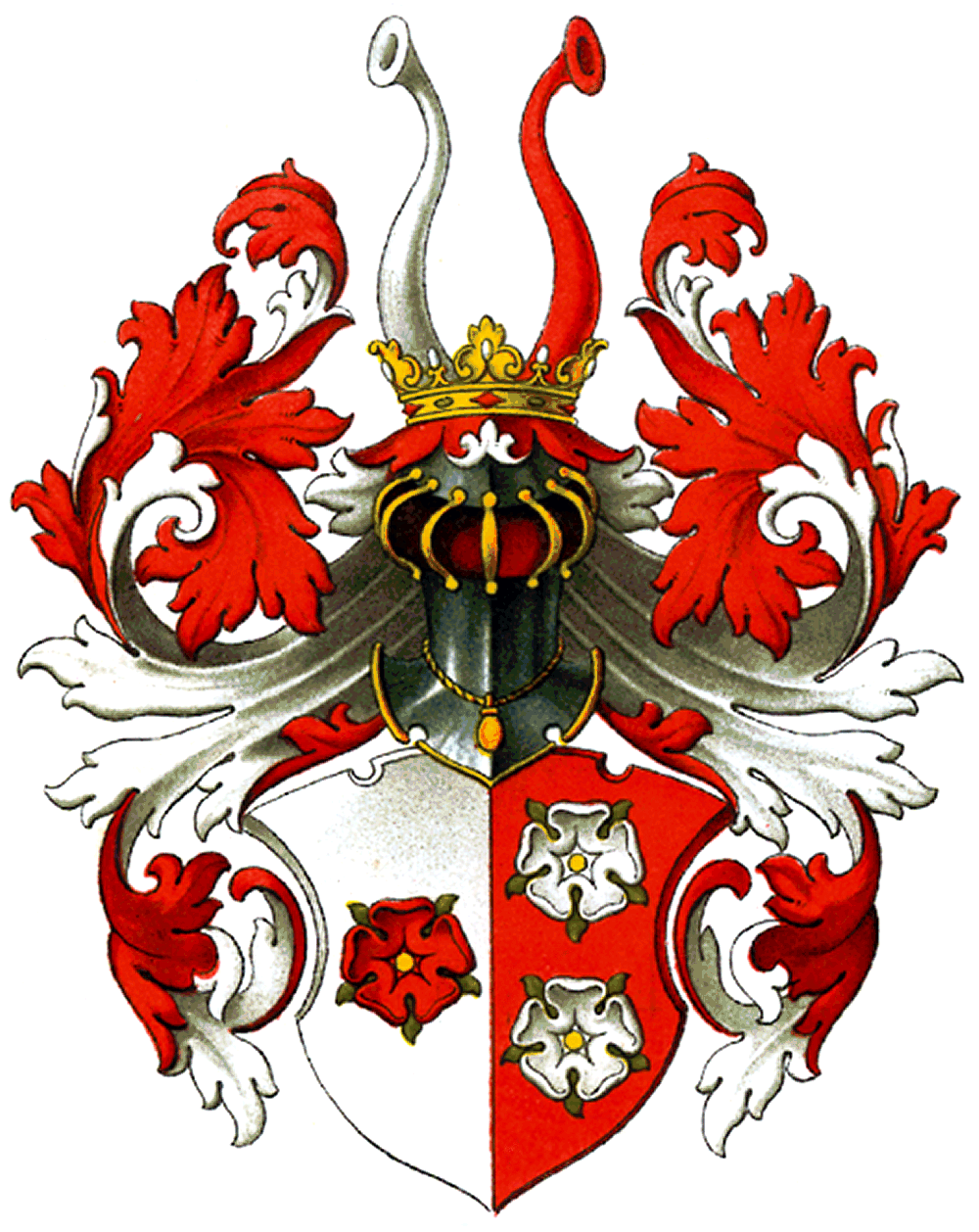
The Schleinitz' coat of arms

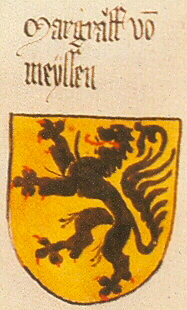
A depiction of the Meißen family's coat of arms, found in the Ingeram Codex

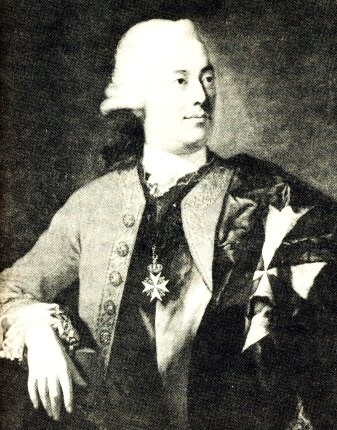
Detlev Carl von Einsiedel, by Anton Graff

At the end of August 1790, Count Einsiedel's Saathain was also affected by the Saxon Peasants' Revolt, which had begun a month earlier near Waldheim and Wechselburg and soon violently broke out in the Lommatzsch region. The rebellious peasants, who were mostly armed with scythes, pitchforks and axes, demanded, among other things, the abolition of compulsory service and interest. Some of the peasants of Saathain also rose up and wanted to summon Count von Einsiedel, who was in Bautzen at the time in his capacity as minister and exercised jurisdiction over them. However, the unrest was quelled a short time later by a detachment of dragoons who arrested four Saathain peasants and brought them to Dresden in chains. The Großenhain bailiff, who had initially come to Saathain himself to calm the rebellious peasants, reported calm in the Großenhain District on September 4, 1790, where the unrest had flared up in the dominions of Frauenhain and Zabeltitz with their associated communities as well as in Saathain itself.

=== From the Congress of Vienna to the Second World War ===
After the German campaign of 1813 ended the Napoleonic domination of the First French Empire over big parts of Europe, the following Congress of Vienna one year later, decided, among other things, that a German Confederation shall be created in near future, succeeding the former Holy Roman Empire (see also: Congress of Vienna#Final agreement and States of the German Confederation). The Kingdom of Saxony, where Saathain was located, became the Saxon Province of the Prussian Kingdom. With that, Saathain, lost its territories of Schweinfurth, Reppis und Gröditz. Thanks to its convenient location and the steel factory founded by Count von Einsiedel in 1779, the now-independent Gröditz quickly developed from a village counting just 150 people in 1834, to a middle-sized city peaking about 10 thousand inhabitants in the nineties.

In 1852, construction work began in Zeischa (incorporated to Bad Liebenwerda, 1993), a few kilometers downstram, to regulate the Black Elster. The river, which until then had consisted of numerous small streams, was given its current bed and diked by 1861. The Röder, which previously flowed a few hundred meters behind Saathainer Castle, was diverted into the old Elster bed, known as the Alte Röder, and now flows into the new course of the Schwarze Elster.

Around the same time, in the second half of the 19th century, industrialization of the region around Saathain began. The village itself, where agriculture remained the main source of income, was indirectly affected by this development. Fishing in the Röder and Schwarze Elster rivers was made largely impossible by the increasing pollution caused by the newly established industrial plants. Many inhabitants of the village found work outside Saathain, and tradesmen and politicians therefore endeavored to take this development into account. On 18 December 1908, on their initiative, the cooperative Elektrische Überlandzentrale Kreis Liebenwerda und Umgebung (lit. 'Interregional Electrical Center, District Liebenswerda and Vicinity') was founded in the Liebenwerda restaurant Weißes Roß (lit. 'White Horse'). The Saathainer landowner Otto Bormann was elected chairman of that project's board. A few years later, the first 110 kilowatt line (see: 110-kV-Leitung Lauchhammer–Riesa) in Europe was built to connect the Lauchhammer plant with the steelworks in Gröditz and Riesa. It went into operation on January 21, 1912. A 15 kilowatt line was branched off at the Gröditz switching station via Prösen to Stolzenhain, which was the first municipality in the Liebenwerda district to receive electricity on June 25, 1912. From there, cables were laid further into the surrounding villages, meaning that Saathain also received an electricity connection in the same year.

Four years later, the Große Röder was regulated (straightened) by the Röderregulierungsgenossenschaft Saathain (lit. 'Saathain Röder regulation cooperative'). Most of the construction work was carried out by prisoners of war. Since then, the course of the river has not changed. During the Second World War, the village was spared direct combat operations. Nevertheless, the Nazi era and the war did not leave Saathain unscathed. The Saathain pastor Wolfgang Bastian, who was newly appointed in September 1934, took over a long-standing dispute with a cantor from his predecessor, who demanded additional pay, which the local church council rejected. The dispute ended with the pastor being denounced to the authorities by the priest. In the letters, the priest sent to high church and NSDAP officials, he accused Bastian of anti-state preachings. After a house search by the Gestapo, where a copy of Die Buddenbrooks, a then-banned book of Thomas Mann was found, Bastian was arrested in March 1942 and died during interrogation in Torgau.

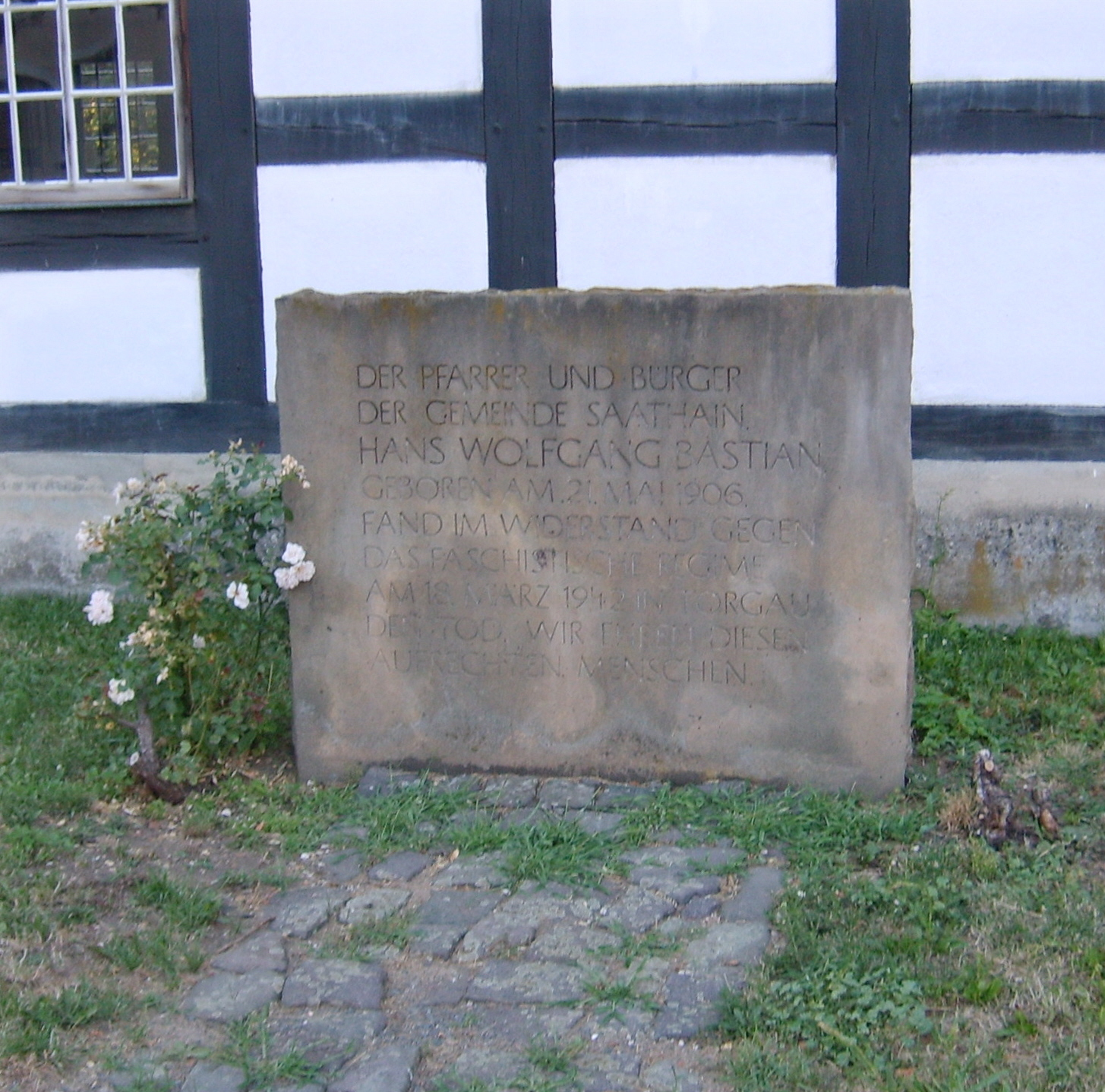
Memorial stone for Wolfgang Bastian. The stone reads: "Der Pfarrer und Bürger der Gemeinde Saathain Hans Wolfgang Bastian, geboren am 21. May 1906, fand im Widerstand gegen das Faschistische Regime am 18. März 1942 in Torgau den Tod. Wir ehren diesen aufrechten Menschen", which translates to: "The priest and citizen of Saathain, Hans Wolfgang Bastian, born 21 May 1906, met his death in the resistance against the fascist regime on March 18th, 1942 in Torgau. We honor this upright person."

Towards the end of the Second World War, the Elster Bridge was destroyed on April 22, 1945, to prevent the advancing troops of the First Ukrainian Front of the Red Army from entering the town. During these days, the Saathain Castle was destroyed by a deliberate fire, which also destroyed the extensive archive with historical records and files, the art treasures stored and the old church registers of the neighboring villages of Würdenhain (with entries of baptisms, weddings and funerals from 1655 to 1812) and Stolzenhain, that were stored there.

=== From the post-war period to the present day ===
The 587 hectares of land owned by the manor belonging to the castle were divided up as part of the land reform in the Soviet occupation zone. A total of 489.91 hectares were split among 281 people in the neighbouring communities of Haida (72.83 ha), Reichenhain (124.80 ha), Saathain (181.33 ha), Stolzenhain (30.11 ha), Würdenhain (78.80 ha) and Kröbeln (2.04 ha). The destroyed Elster bridge was completely replaced after the war by a new bridge, which was rebuilt in 2003 and 2004 due to considerable damage.

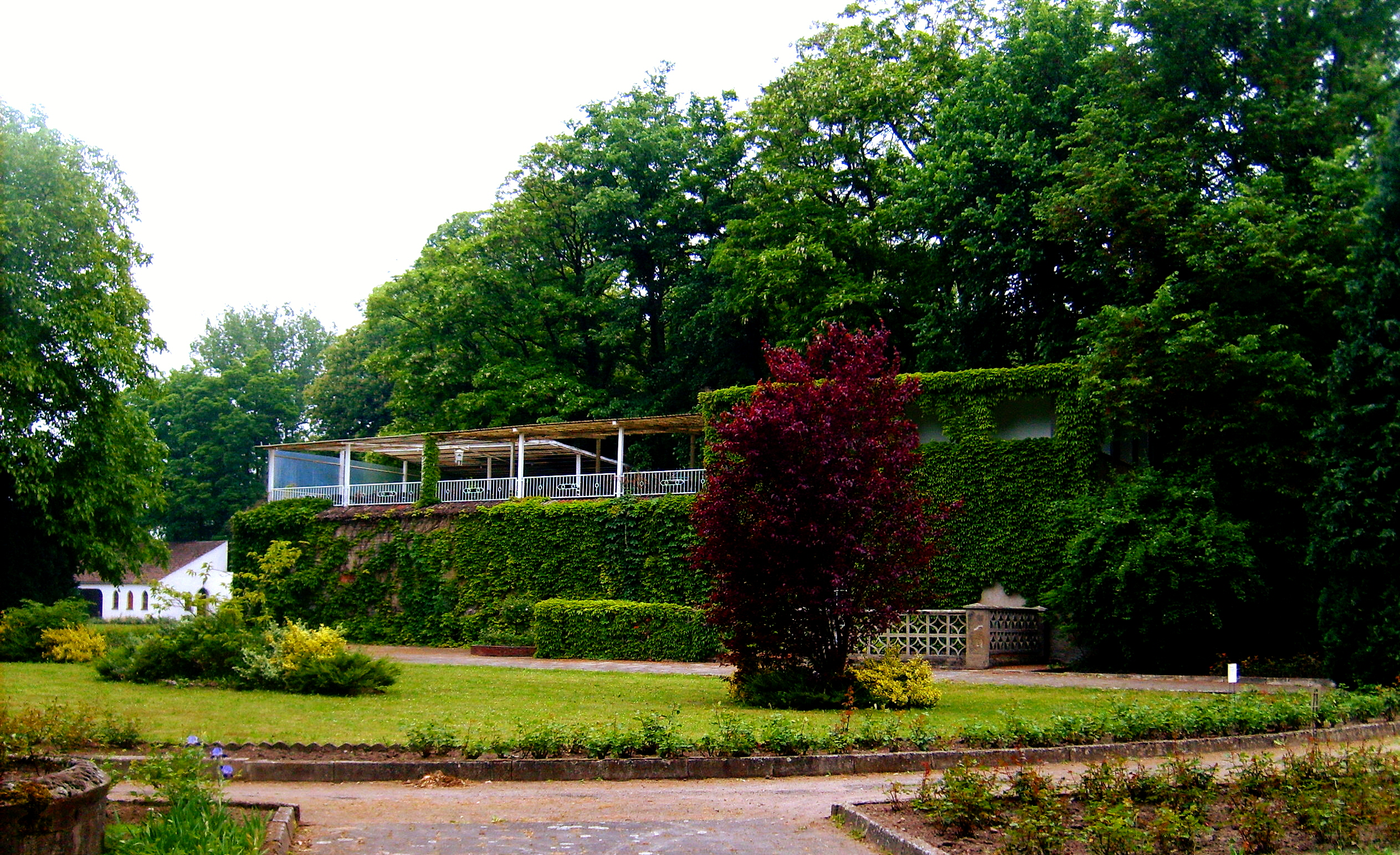
The castle ruins

In the German Democratic Republic (East Germany), Saathain belonged to the state of Saxony-Anhalt until its dissolution in 1952, and after the establishment of the Bezirke until reunification in 1990 to the Bezirk Cottbus. During this time, the village was shaped by the work of mayor Heinz Dreißig, who took over the office in 1951 and held it until 1990. In 1955, work began on the expansion of Friedensstraße ('Peace Street'). Further improvements to the infrastructure followed later. A sports ground with a bowling alley and open-air theatre was built. The old schoolhouse, built in 1837, was converted into a community centre with a nurses' station and doctor's surgery. After the village school was closed in 1975, a consumers' co-operative was set up the following year in the second school building, that built in 1922. The castle ruins were converted into a terrace and the old estate park into a rose garden. Extensive renovation work was undertaken on the church. In 1991, the German National Committee for Monument Protection awarded Heinz Dreißig the German Prize for Monument Protection for his work. This prize, which has been awarded since 1977 and is the highest award in this field in Germany, "is given to individuals and groups of people who dedicate themselves on a voluntary basis to the protection, care and long-term preservation of the architectural and archaeological heritage. As a rule, the achievements should be of a long-term nature and go far beyond the usual civic commitment."

After the Peaceful Revolution, the Amt Röderland (see also: Amt#Germany) was formed on 15 January 1992, consisting of the municipalities of Saathain and the surrounding villages of Prösen, Reichenhain, Stolzenhain, Wainsdorf, Haida and Würdenhain (which was then a subdivision of Haida). On 26 October 2003, as part of the Municipal Area Reform in the State of Brandenburg, the villages belonging to the Amt were merged to form the independent municipality of Röderland. The villages of the municipality belonged to the district of Bad Liebenwerda until the district reform in Brandenburg in 1993, which merged with the districts of Herzberg and Finsterwalde to form the district of Elbe-Elster on 6 December 1993.

In the 1990s, the village's infrastructure, such as roads, the kindergarten facilities and a club were largely modernised. In addition, the reconstruction of the Saathainer estate, which was used for agricultural purposes by the Landwirtschaftliche Produktionsgenossenschaft, was completed in July 2001.

=== Population Development ===
In 1486, 14 gardeners were counted in Saathain. In 1575, there were 14 Hufners, a type of farmer, and 15 gardeners. There were 412 people residing in 63 houses, along with 27 horses, 237 cattle, 600 sheep, 12 goats and 109 pigs in 1835. Following World War II and the expulsion of Germans, the population significantly grew, and reached its all-time-preak of 790 in 1946. Since then, the population number has steadily been decreasing.

Population numbers from 1875 to 2018
Year	Population	Year	Population	Year	Population	Year	Population	Year	Population	Year	Population
1835	412	1939	573	1985	588	1994	567	2000	605	2018	486
1875	400	1946	790	1989	577	1995	569	2001	606	2024	
1890	460	1950	784	1990	576	1996	575	2002	595		
1910	500	1964	656	1991	570	1997	603	2009	535		
1925	565	1971	622	1992	563	1998	615	2010	547		
1933	532	1981	580	1993	561	1999	604	2013	516		

== Politics ==
=== Representation on the Municipal Level ===
Since the merger of Saathain with the surrounding villages of Haida, Prösen, Reichenhain, Stolzenhain, Wainsdorf and Würdenhain on October 26, 2003, the village has been an Ortsteil (District/Village) of the municipality of Röderland. According to the municipality's main statutes, every village except for Prösen is represented by the mayor and two more elected representatives, who form a three-head village council. Prösen, the administrative center of Röderland, has a five-head council but otherwise follows the same system.

==== 2019 Election ====
In 2019, 311 (71 Percent) of the 438 eligible voters submitted 896 votes. 64 (7.14%) of the votes went towards the candidate(s) of the SPD and 832 (92.86%) chose the Free Voters Association Saathain. The votes for the Free Voters Association Saathain break down as follows:

Candidate	Votes
Carsten Pötzsch	363
Peter Hoffmann	196
Rene Herrmann	142

All three seats were given to the Free Voters Association Saathain's candidates. Carsten Pötzsch became mayor and chose Rene Herrmann as his deputy.

==== 2014 Election ====
The 2014 Election resulted in the same distribution of seats as in 2008 and Joachim Pfützner was re-elected. 306 of the 454 eligible voters (a turnout of 67,40%) submitted 899 valid votes that break down as follows:

Party	Votes
The Left	195 (21,69%)
Free Voters Association Saathain	595 (66,18%)
Gut Saathain Party	109 (12,12%)

Of the 595 votes for the Voters Association, 230 went towards Wieland Roselt and 205 went towards Carsten Pötzsch, who both got seats in the council. The only candidate of the Left Party got the third seat.

==== 2008 Election ====
On 28 September 2008, 308 of the 462 eligible voters, submitted 889 valid and 7 invalid votes. The candidates and the number of votes they received were:

Party	Name	Birth date	Profession	Votes
The Left	Joachim Pfützner	1948	Teacher	169
The Left	Sigmar Albrecht	1953	Teacher	48
Free Voters Association Saathain	Reiner Marteinsteig	1971	Customer Service Technician	63
Free Voters Association Saathain	Dietmar Gebel	1951	Graduate Mathematician	374
Free Voters Association Saathain	Klaus-Peter Schulze	1945	Retired	66
Free Voters Association Saathain	Detlef Scheibe	1956	Educator	167

Gebel was elected mayor with Scheibe as deputy. Pfnützner was the third member of the council without an extra role.

=== Other Elections ===
While the statistics for bigger elections such as for the Bundestag or the European Parliament exist for the entirety of Röderland, only the listed elections are tracked village-wise.

== Culture and Sights ==
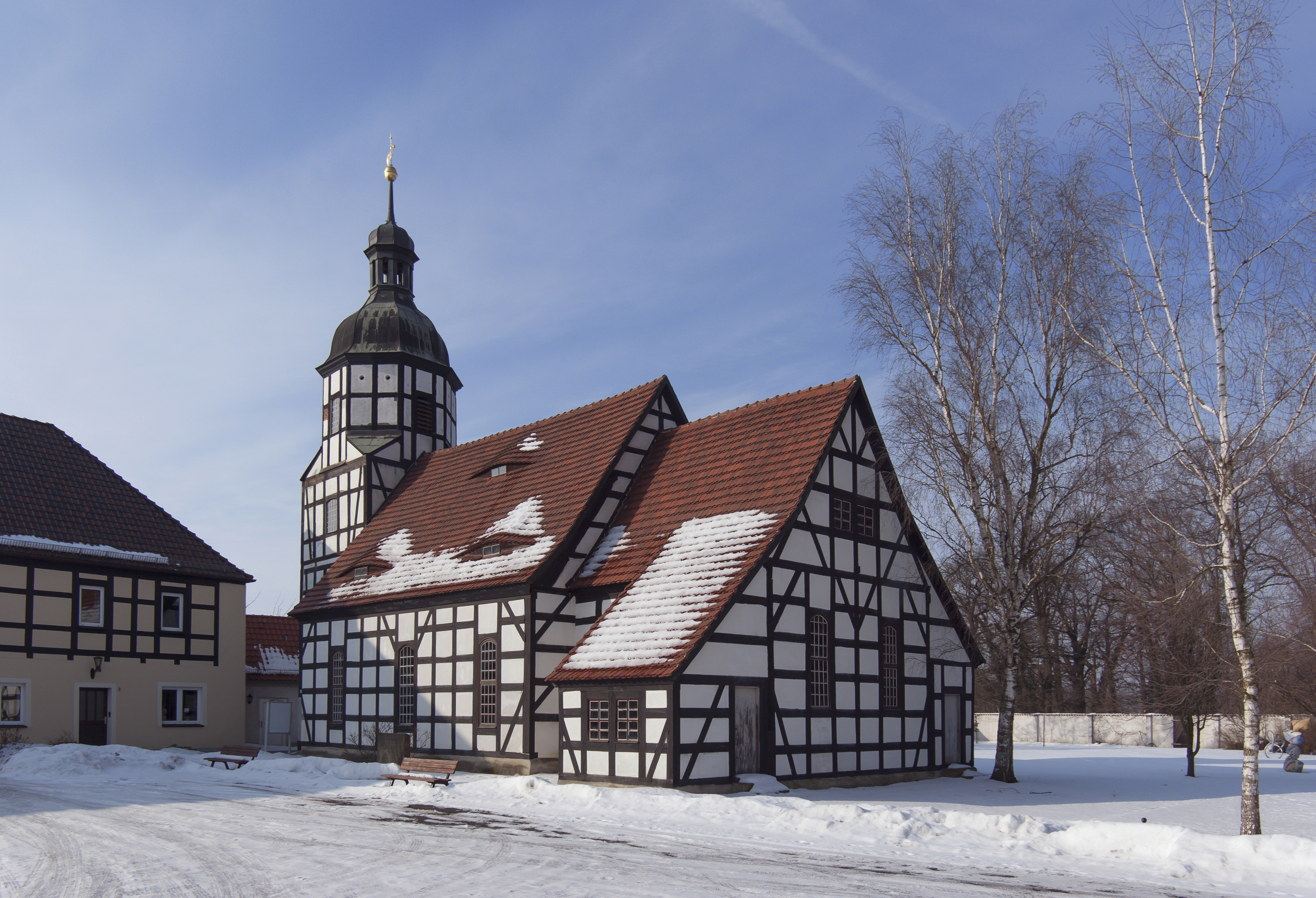

=== Cultural events ===
With numerous concerts and exhibitions hosted, the former Saathainer Gut is one of the cultural centres of the municipality and the district of Elbe-Elster. Since May 2006, it has been possible to have a civil wedding in the historic half-timbered church.

Since 1953, the Easter Bunny has been visiting the village's sports field on Easter Sunday. Usually accompanied by other members of his kind, he distributes sweets and Easter eggs to the many children who turn up.

Another highlight is the yearly sports festival in July.

=== Club life ===
The SG Röder 20 sports club exists since 1920. In 1949, the club was renamed BSG Traktor Saathain. After the reunification, the club was renamed back to its old name in 1992. In addition to the football section, whose first team currently (2010) plays in the 1st district league (Kreisliga), there are also bowling, volleyball and gymnastics sections.

Another active association is the Förderverein Gut Saathain e. V., founded in 1996 Joachim Pfützner, then-mayor of Saathain. The non-profit association, which was initially founded as Kirche, Park und Rosengarten Saathain e. V., was given its name in 2008. The current (2010) approximately 30 members strive for the complex promotion, preservation and development of the former Saathain estate as a cultural centre.

The village's volunteer fire department - "Freiwillige Feuerwehr" in German - was founded in 1934 and has been providing fire protection and general assistance ever since. The fire station, which was built between 1957 and 1959, is located opposite the former village school at the junction to Neusaathain. The fire brigade is currently equipped with one Renault Master engine.

=== Sights ===
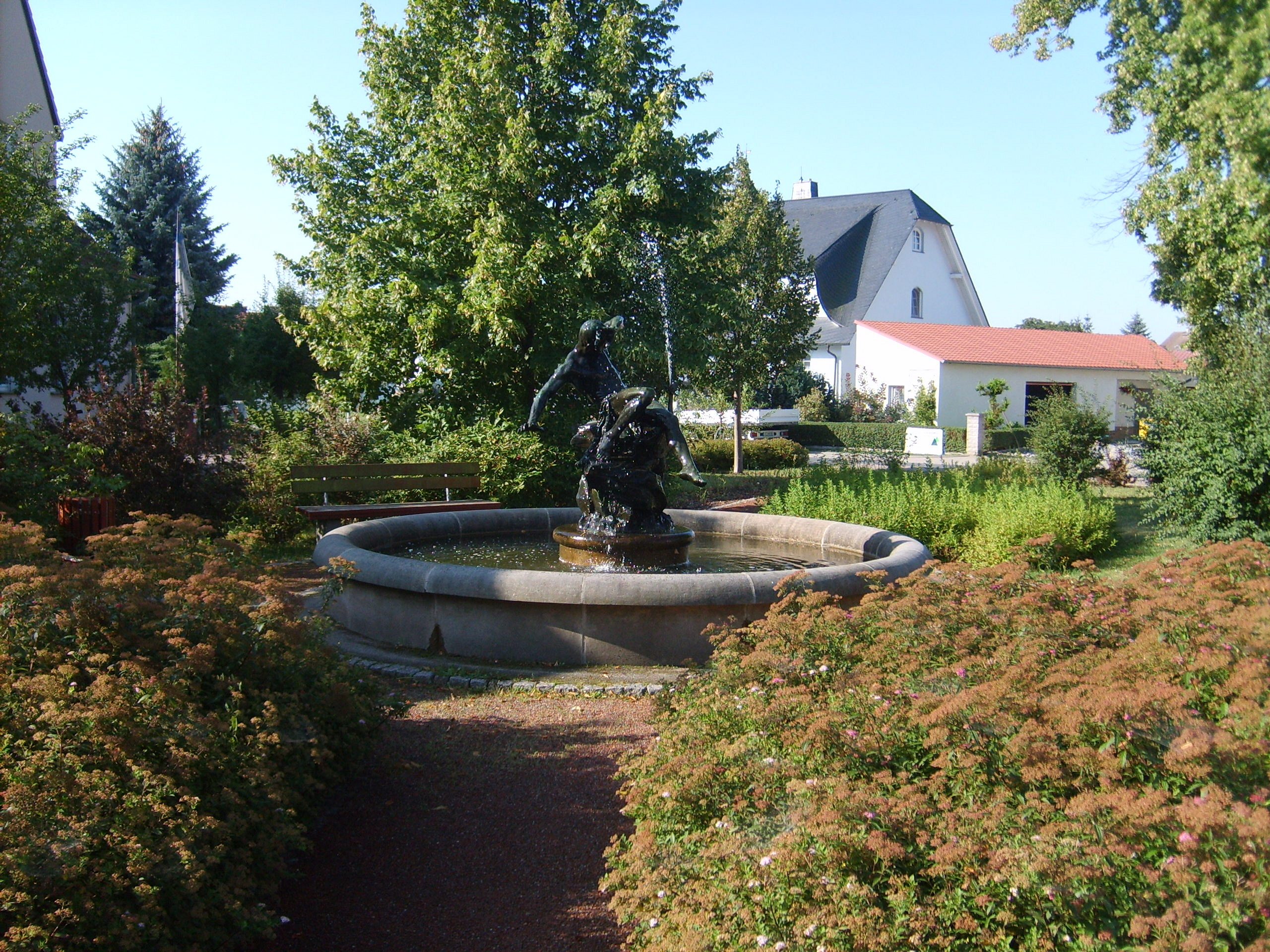
The fountain from 1930

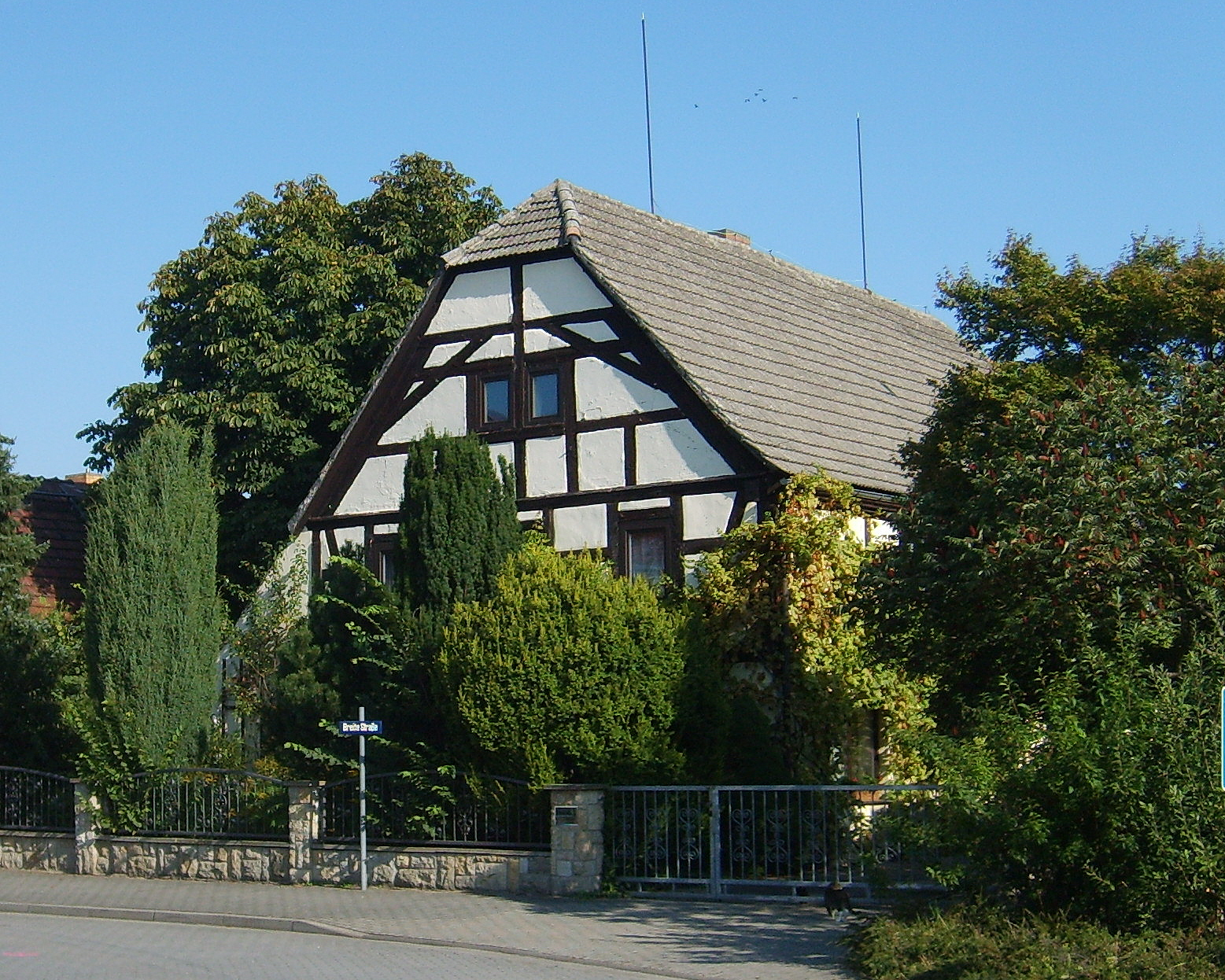
A listed house in the Breite Straße

The town has several monuments that have been included in the list of monuments of the state of Brandenburg.

The park of the former Saathain Castle was transformed into a rose garden in 1972 with around 5,000 rose bushes and more than 70 rose varieties. The ruins of the castle were converted into a terrace with a summer café overlooking the garden.

The half-timbered building of the village's former manor church (see: Gutskirche Saathain), which dates back to 1629, was built on the site of a castle chapel mentioned in a document from 1575. It was remodelled in 1816 and has been a listed building since 1968. After extensive renovation work, it has been open to the public again since 1990. A sculpture park was opened on a meadow directly behind the building in May 2004. In front of the church is a memorial stone to the pastor Wolfgang Bastian, who died in Torgau in 1942 during interrogations by the Gestapo (see above).

In the former castle park, in front of the remains of the castle, there is a monument in the form of a rough granite boulder that was inaugurated on 6 July 1958. A plaque in the upper part bears the name of the village as well as the village's coat of arms, an oak tree and a water lily, reminiscent of the water-rich forests near Röderwald. Below this are some chronological informations about the history of Saathain.

On the village square there is a listed fountain from 1930, which was originally located in front of Saathain Castle. It was moved to its current location on the village square in 1953.

In Breite Straße, a residential building with a farmhouse, barn and outbuilding is a listed building.

The old Rödermühle mill in the south of the village was also listed. The historic building, which ceased operations in 1974, fell victim to a fire in September 1997. The ruins of the watermill, that was first mentioned in the 16th century, are located on the former course of the Große Röder river in the settlement of Neusaathain. The grounds of the Rödermühle are home to a tree nursery, a gallery that opened in 1998, a small petting zoo and a summer café.

=== Saathain as the Cradle of the Saxon traveling marionette theater. ===
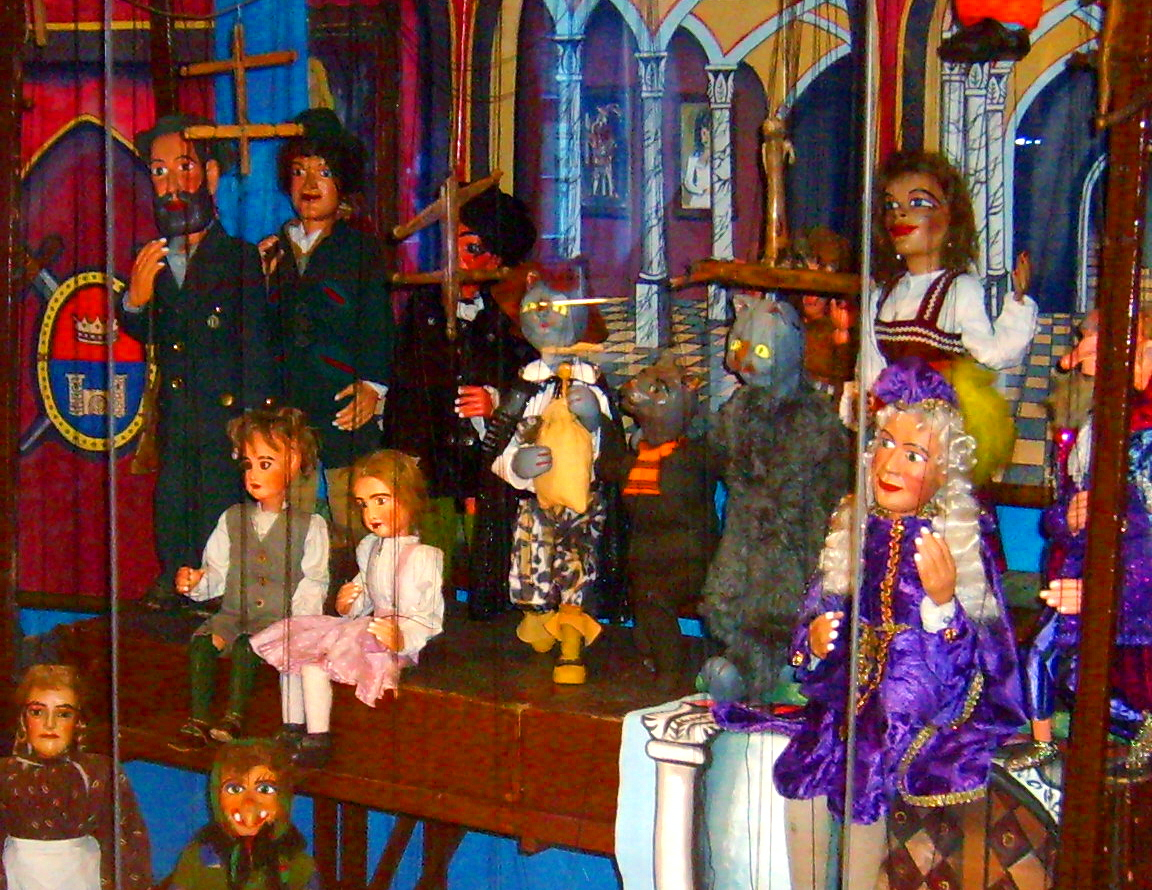

Saathain, like the Elbe-Elster region, is considered to be the cradle of Saxon travelling puppet theatre. Representatives of this art have been known to have lived in Saathain since the beginning of the 19th century. The first known puppeteer to settle in the settlement of Neu-Saathain was Johann Georg Bille († 1832). He purchased a house with a barn and stables from the Saathain estate owner, the Imperial Count of Solms and Tecklenburg, for 200 thalers in 1803. Bille was followed by other puppeteers; the most famous names of puppeteer families in Saathain are Richter (since 1832), Gassmann, Hähnel and Gierhold. Through marriages between the individual families, family ties developed between almost all Saxon puppeteer families. They spent most of the year travelling and only came to Saathain to spend the winter with their relatives.

With the advent of cinema and television in the 20th century, the individual theatres were largely abandoned. However, individual families have preserved this tradition to the present day, such as the Bille family (see: Theaterfamilie Bille), who alone owned around 12 independent theatres in the 18th and 19th centuries, making them one of the most important puppeteer dynasties in Europe. Since December 1998, a permanent exhibition in the Bad Liebenwerda District Museum titled Von der Schusterahle zum Marionettenzwirn (From the Shoemaker's Awl to the Marionette Twine) has been exploring the history of marionette theatre in the Elbe-Elster region. The core of the exhibition is a marionette theatre collection by the Dobra puppeteer Karl Gierhold. One of the four sections of this exhibition in the museum is dedicated to the Saathainer puppeteers.

== Economy and Infrastructure ==
=== Economy and Transport ===
On 18 April 1958, the type I Landwirtschaftliche Produktionsgenossenschaft (agricultural production cooperative) Neue Saat was founded in Saathain. Initially, it consisted of two farms, which farmed 20.66 hectares with four members. By 9 June 1959, the Neue Saat already had five farms with nine members, and the cultivated area had grown to 47.09 hectares. In 1974/75, it merged into the LPG Friedrich Engels of Stolzenhain. The headquarters of the new cooperative, was located in Stolzenhain until it was dissolved in 1991.

Agriculture has largely lost its former importance in Saathain. A large proportion of the agricultural land in the municipality of Röderland is farmed by Lawi GmbH, which emerged from the LPG Friedrich Engels in 1991 and is based in Stolzenhain. The village is home to a number of medium-sized businesses, such as the Saathainer Mühle tree nursery and the Pförtner bakery. The Zur Linde inn is located on Alte Dorfstraße. The industrial estates closest to the village are located in Elsterwerda, Haida and Prösen.

Saathain is connected to the Brandenburg state road No. 59 near Stolzenhain and to the federal roads B 101 and B 169, which pass through Elsterwerda. The nearest railway stations are Elsterwerda station (Berlin–Dresden railway and Zeithain–Elsterwerda railway lines) and Elsterwerda-Biehla station (Węgliniec–Roßlau railway).

Several paved cycle paths along the Black Elster connect Saathain with the sights of the surrounding area, the Niederlausitzer Heidelandschaft nature park and the Schraden lowlands a few kilometres to the east. The Tour Brandenburg, Germany's longest long-distance cycle route at 1111 kilometres, runs past the village. Other cycle routes include the Fürst-Pückler-Weg, which was included in the project list of the International Building Exhibition Fürst-Pückler-Land under the motto 500 kilometres through time, and the 108-kilometre Schwarze-Elster-Radweg.

=== Education ===
Nach der Auflösung der Dorfschule im Jahr 1975 wurden die Kinder des Ortes zunächst in die Polytechnische Oberschule in Elsterwerda-Biehla eingeschult, aus der nach der Wende ein inzwischen wieder aufgelöstes Gymnasium und eine Grundschule hervorgingen. Gegenwärtig werden die Schüler des Ortsteils in die Grundschule Prösen eingeschult, die den Status einer Verlässlichen Halbtagesschule besitzt; Träger ist die Gemeinde Röderland. In Prösen befindet sich außerdem eine private Oberschule. Im unweit gelegenen Elsterwerda besteht eine Oberschule, ein Gymnasium sowie weitere Bildungseinrichtungen. Die nächstgelegenen Bibliotheken sind in Elsterwerda und Prösen.

After the dissolution of the village school in 1975, the children of the village were initially enrolled in the polytechnic secondary school in Elsterwerda-Biehla, from which a now again closed Gymnasium and a primary school emerged after reunification. Currently, pupils in the district are enrolled at the Prösen primary school, which has the official status of a Verlässlichen Halbtagesschule (reliable half-day school) and is run by the municipality of Röderland. There is also a private secondary school in Prösen. In nearby Elsterwerda, there is a secondary school, a Gymnasium and other educational institutions. The nearest libraries are in Elsterwerda and Prösen.

=== Media ===
The local gazette Gemeindeanzeiger and the official gazette for the municipality of Röderland (Amtsblatt für die Gemeinde Röderland) are published monthly in Saathain. The Elbe-Elster district gazette (Kreisanzeiger) is published as required.

The regional daily newspaper in the Elbe-Elster district is the Elbe-Elster-Rundschau, which belongs to the Lausitzer Rundschau and has a circulation of around 99,000 copies. The free advertising papers Wochenkurier and SonntagsWochenBlatt are published weekly.

== Notable people ==
The lives of the following people are associated with Saathain:

- Walther von Köckritz (* in Saathain; † 1411), Canon of Magdeburg, Merseburg and Meissen, Bishop of Merseburg
- Samuel August Wagner (* 1734 in Saathain; † 1788 in Dresden), doctor and educator
- Karl Benedikt Suttinger (* 1746 in Saathain; † 1830 in Lübben), poet and educator
- Hans Wolfgang Bastian (* 21 May 1906 in Elsterwerda; † 18 March 1942 in Torgau), Protestant pastor, died during interrogation by the Gestapo
- Heinz Dreißig (1925–2022), Mayor from 1951 to 1990, was awarded the ‘German Prize for Monument Protection’ by the German National Committee for Monument Protection in 1991 for his services. Dreißig has been an honorary citizen of Saathain since 2015.

== Literature ==
- Felix Hoffmann (1957), Arbeitsgemeinschaften der Natur- und Heimatfreunde des Deutschen Kulturbundes Kreis Bad Liebenwerda (ed.), "Über 800 Jahre liegt Saathain an der Röder", Heimatkalender für den Kreis Bad Liebenwerda, Bad Liebenwerda, pp. 63–66
- Felix Hoffmann (1960), Arbeitsgemeinschaften der Natur- und Heimatfreunde des Deutschen Kulturbundes Kreis Bad Liebenwerda (ed.), "Die steinerne Chronik von Saathain", Heimatkalender für den Kreis Bad Liebenwerda, Bad Liebenwerda, pp. 198–201
