= Haida (Brandenburg) =

- Ortsteil of Röderland
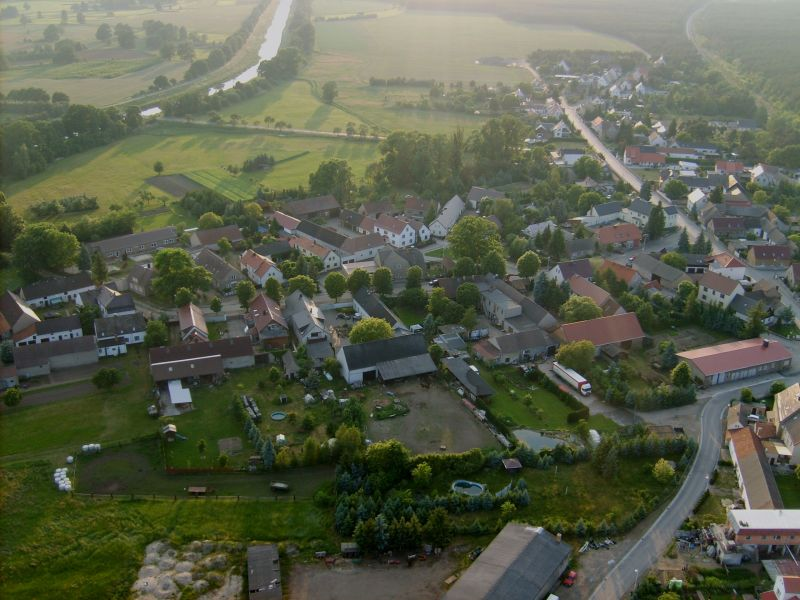
- Interactive map of Haida
- Location within Germany Location within Brandenburg
- Coordinates: 51°28′47″N 13°28′01″E
- Country: Germany
- State: Brandenburg
- District: Elbe-Elster
- Municipality: Röderland
- Elevation: 92.2 m (302 ft)

Population (2024-12-31)
  - Total: 463
- Time zone: UTC+01:00 (CET)
  - Summer (DST): UTC+02:00 (CEST)
- Postal codes: 04932
- Dialling codes: 03533

Haida is a village located in the Elbe-Elster District of southern Brandenburg in Germany. Located within the Naturpark Niederlausitzer Heidelandschaft, it is officially an Ortsteil of the municipality of Röderland since 26 October 2003.

For the past century or two, the local economy has been shaped by plant nurserys and gravel pits in the north of the village. Additionally a business park spanning 27 hectares (67 acres) lies next to where the Bundesstraße 101 passes the village.

== Geography ==
Haida is the northernmost point of Röderland, with Pösen, the administrative center, about 8 kilometres (5.0 mi) south-east of the village.

== History ==
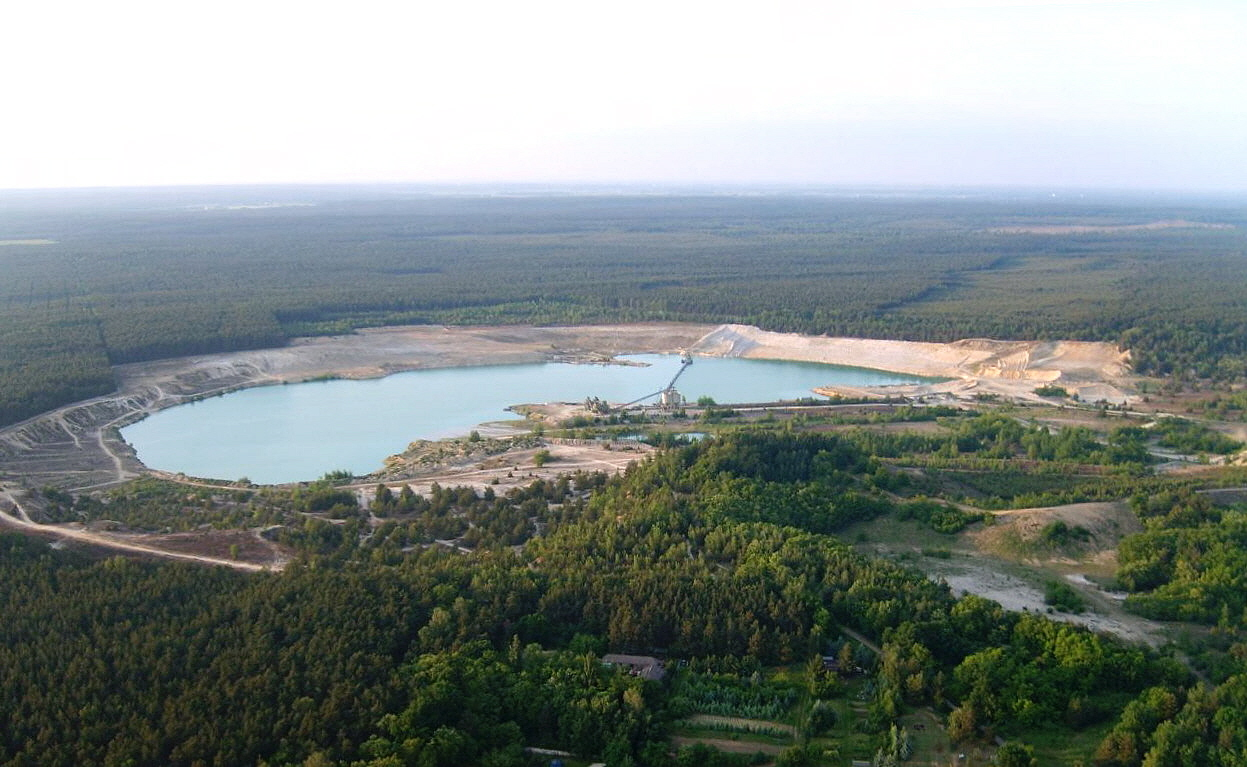
The gravel pit of Haida

The village's first documented mention is from 1443, where it was named a dominion of Würdenhain. It was then named "Heide", which stems from the Middle High German word for a flat, undeveloped land. A claim of a much older first mention from 1251 exists, though unconfirmed.

A decade after it was assigned to the Electorate of Saxony's administrative subdivision (a so-called "Amt") of Mühlberg (see: Amt Mühlberg), Haida and a few bordering villages were scene of a suppressed peasant upsrising in 1564 against the Amt's administrator Valtin Fuchs, which ended in arrests and convictions.

During the Thirty Years' War, the village was looted by Swedish field marshal Johan Banér in January 1637. It is documented, that in the year of 1652, only two of eleven farms were able to pay their taxes, as a result.

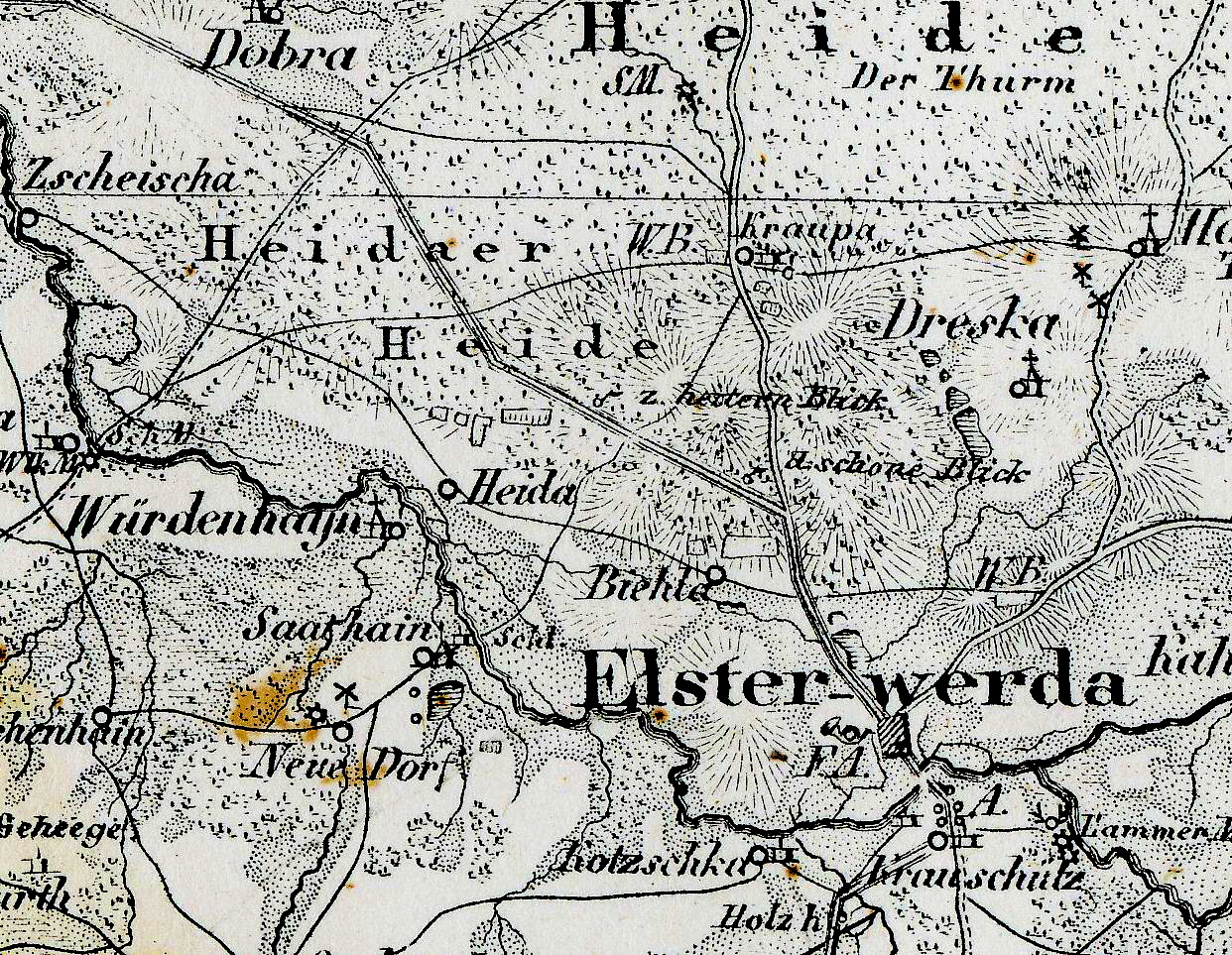
A 19th century map

== Demography ==
The population quickly grew after the establishment of a rail connection and the foundation of the first industrial businesses in the region. After the Second World War, the population experienced quick growth due to the settlement of German expellees from eastern Europe. After the German Reunification though, many people migrated to the west and birth rates sank.

Population numbers from 1875 to 2010
Year	Population	Year	Population	Year	Population	Year	Population	Year	Population
1875	174	1946	799	1989	835	1995	800	2001	789
1890	181	1950	787	1990	848	1996	786	2002	758
1910	250	1964	684	1991	814	1997	800	2006	665
1925	430	1971	694	1992	802	1998	804	2009	580
1933	531	1981	803	1993	807	1999	805	2010	574
1939	594	1985	807	1994	785	2000	799		

== Literature ==
- Felix Hoffmann (1959), Arbeitsgemeinschaften der Natur- und Heimatfreunde des Deutschen Kulturbundes Kreis Bad Liebenwerda (ed.), Die Hüfner von Haida. In: Heimatkalender für den Kreis Bad Liebenwerda, Bad Liebenwerda, pp. 88–90
- Heinz Kettmann (1959), Arbeitsgemeinschaften der Natur- und Heimatfreunde des Deutschen Kulturbundes Kreis Bad Liebenwerda (ed.), Der Alte von der Quallwiese. In: Heimatkalender für den Kreis Bad Liebenwerda, Bad Liebenwerda, pp. 177–182
- Felix Hoffmann (1960), Arbeitsgemeinschaften der Natur- und Heimatfreunde des Deutschen Kulturbundes Kreis Bad Liebenwerda (ed.), Weißes Glod von Haida. In: Heimatkalender für den Kreis Bad Liebenwerda, Bad Liebenwerda, pp. 93–97
- Michael Bork, Horst Krampe (2004), Arbeitsgemeinschaft für Heimatkunde e. V. Bad Liebenwerda (ed.), "Schätze unserer Heimat – Spezialsande und Zuschlagstoffe aus Haida", Heimatkalender für den Altkreis Bad Liebenwerda, das Mückenberger Ländchen, Ortrand am Schraden und Uebigau-Falkenberg, vol. 2004/2005, Bad Liebenwerda, pp. 300–312
