= Saathain Castle =

Castle in Brandenburg

Coordinates: 51°28′N 13°28′E

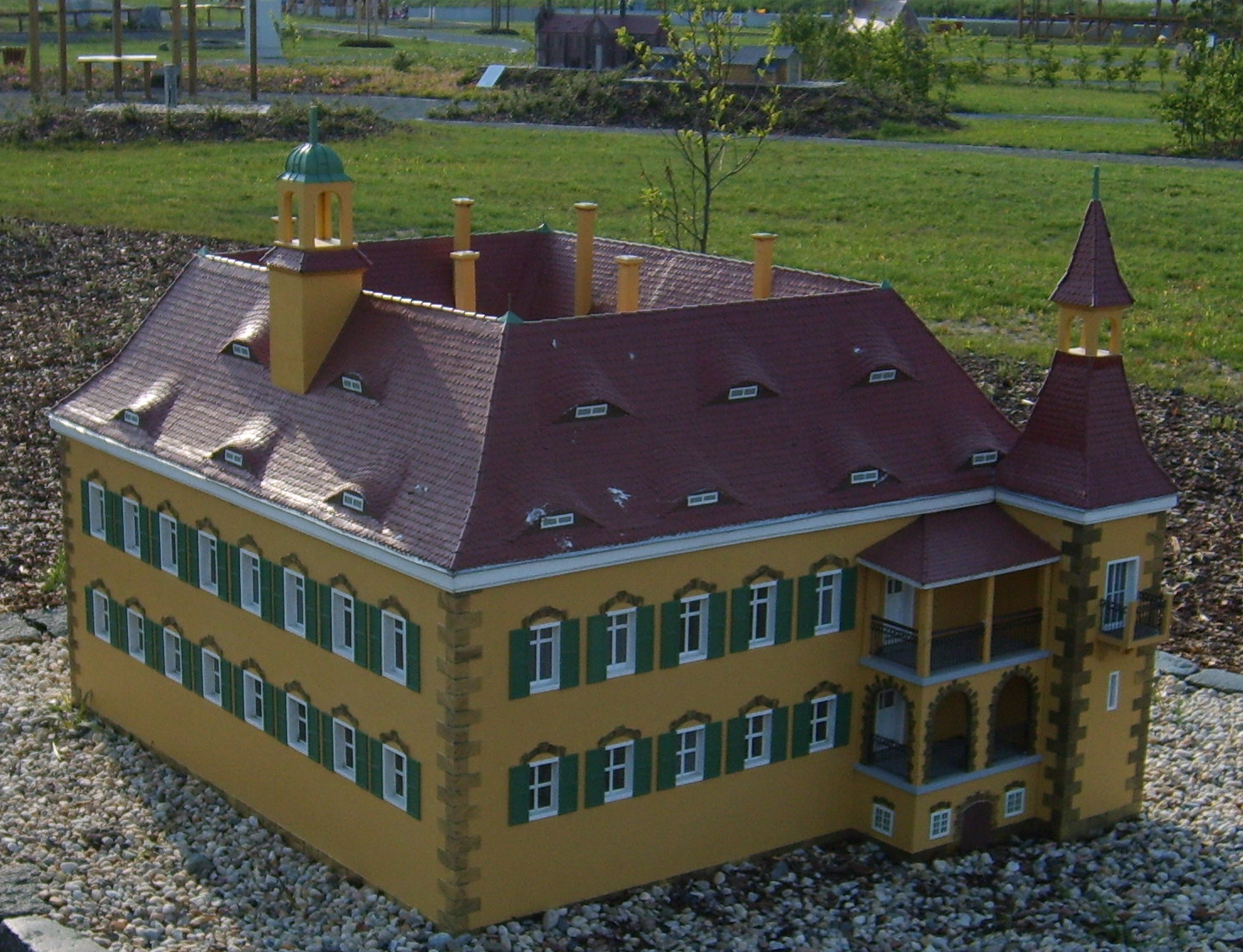
Model of the former castle in Saathain in the Elsterwerda Miniature Park

The remains of Saathain Castle (German: Schloss Saathain) and its former manor are situated on the left bank of the Black Elster River in Saathain, which is a district within the southern Brandenburg municipality of Röderland. Following a devastating fire in April 1945, the historic structure was reduced to its foundation walls. These remnants now support a terrace that was once a café. The park that once surrounded the castle has been transformed into a beautiful rose garden, making it a favored destination for excursions.

== History ==
Saathain is among the oldest fortifications on the Black Elster, with historical records mentioning the castrum Sathim as early as 1140. The castle played a pivotal role in securing the river crossing at the confluence of the Große Röder, which also marked the border to the neighboring Gau Nizizi. It likely served to safeguard and regulate army and trade routes running alongside the Black Elster. Downstream, about one kilometer away, lay the fortified complex of Würdenhain Castle, destroyed in the mid-15th century. The lordship encompassed villages including Stolzenhain, Schweinfurth, Reppis, Gröditz, and Mühldorf, the last of which was incorporated into Kröbeln in 1935. Along with Tiefenau, Elsterwerda, Frauenhain, Ortrand, and Großenhain, the castle was part of the Naumburg monastery's imperial fief until the mid-14th century. In 1274, Bishop Meinherr of Naumburg granted Saathain Castle to Heinrich the Illustrious for life. In 1276 the enfeoffment was also extended to Heinrich's son Friedrich Clem and his descendants.

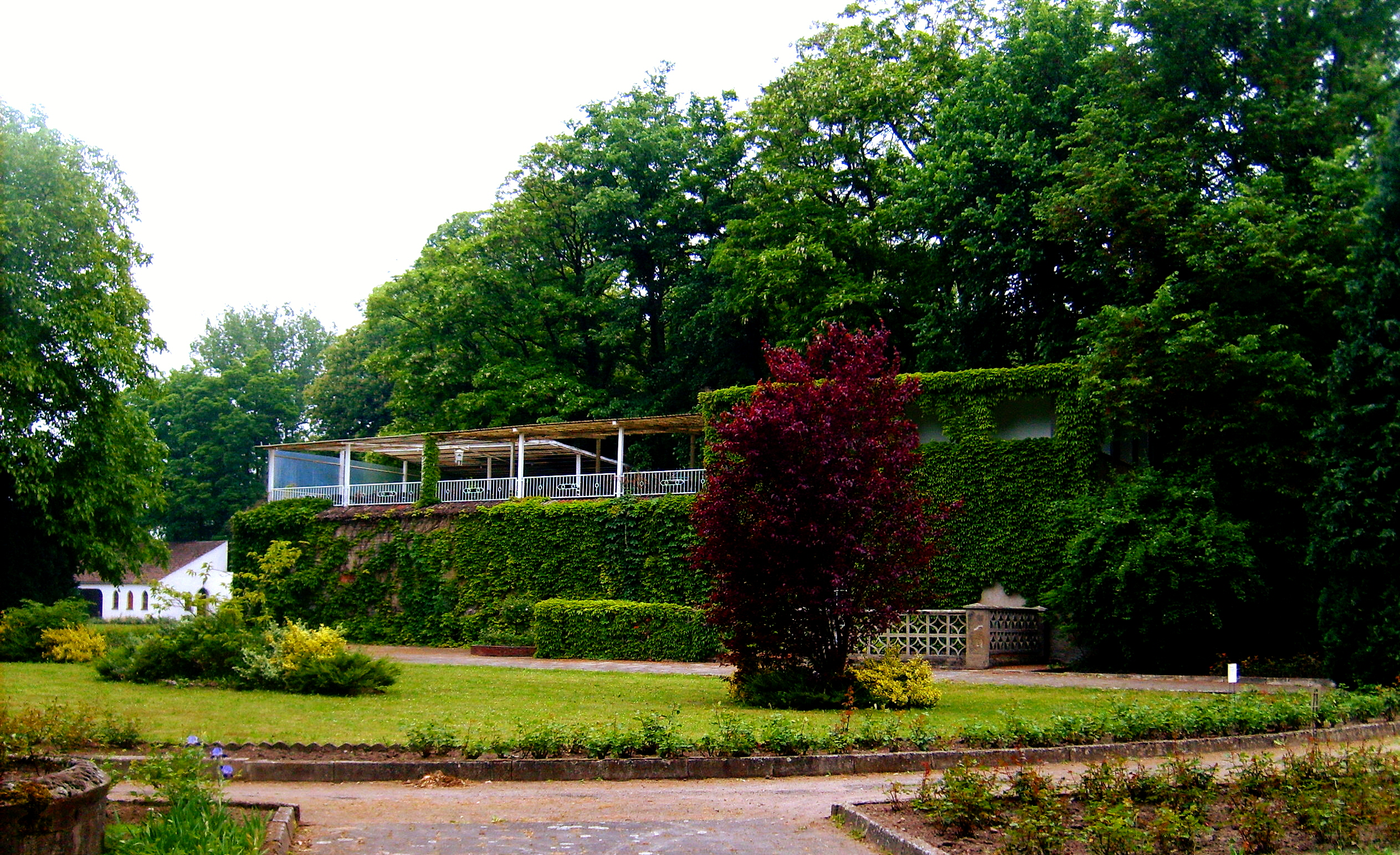
The rose garden in Saathain with the foundation walls of the old castle in Saathain.

From 1348 onwards, the noble family of the von Köckritz resided in Saathain. They were followed by the Schleinitze family in maintaining their presence in Saathain. At that time, the noble dynasty of Meissen also possessed the Mückenberg estate, located about 20 kilometers to the east, and this estate was connected to Saathain via the Schleinitzweg. Notably, in Elsterwerda, there is still a street near the Biehla railway station along the Węgliniec-Roßlau railway line that bears the name 'Schleinitzweg'. The Schleinitz family continued their residency in Saathain until 1716. In that year, Woldemar Freiherr von Löwendal, who had previously acquired the neighboring Elsterwerda manor in 1708, obtained ownership of the Saathain and Mückenberg manors. In 1727, he bequeathed Saathain to his wife, who subsequently sold the manor to Johann George von Einsiedel in 1748. After Johann George von Einsiedel's passing, Saathain was inherited by his three children, who reached an agreement in 1761. Under this agreement, Johann Georg Friedrich and the later Saxon cabinet minister Detlev Carl Count von Einsiedel would jointly receive the estate. In 1777, Detlev Carl Count von Einsiedel acquired his brother's half of the Saathain estate, becoming its sole owner from that point forward. In 1794, he bequeathed Saathain to his son Detlev Count von Einsiedel, who, however, sold the property after just two years.

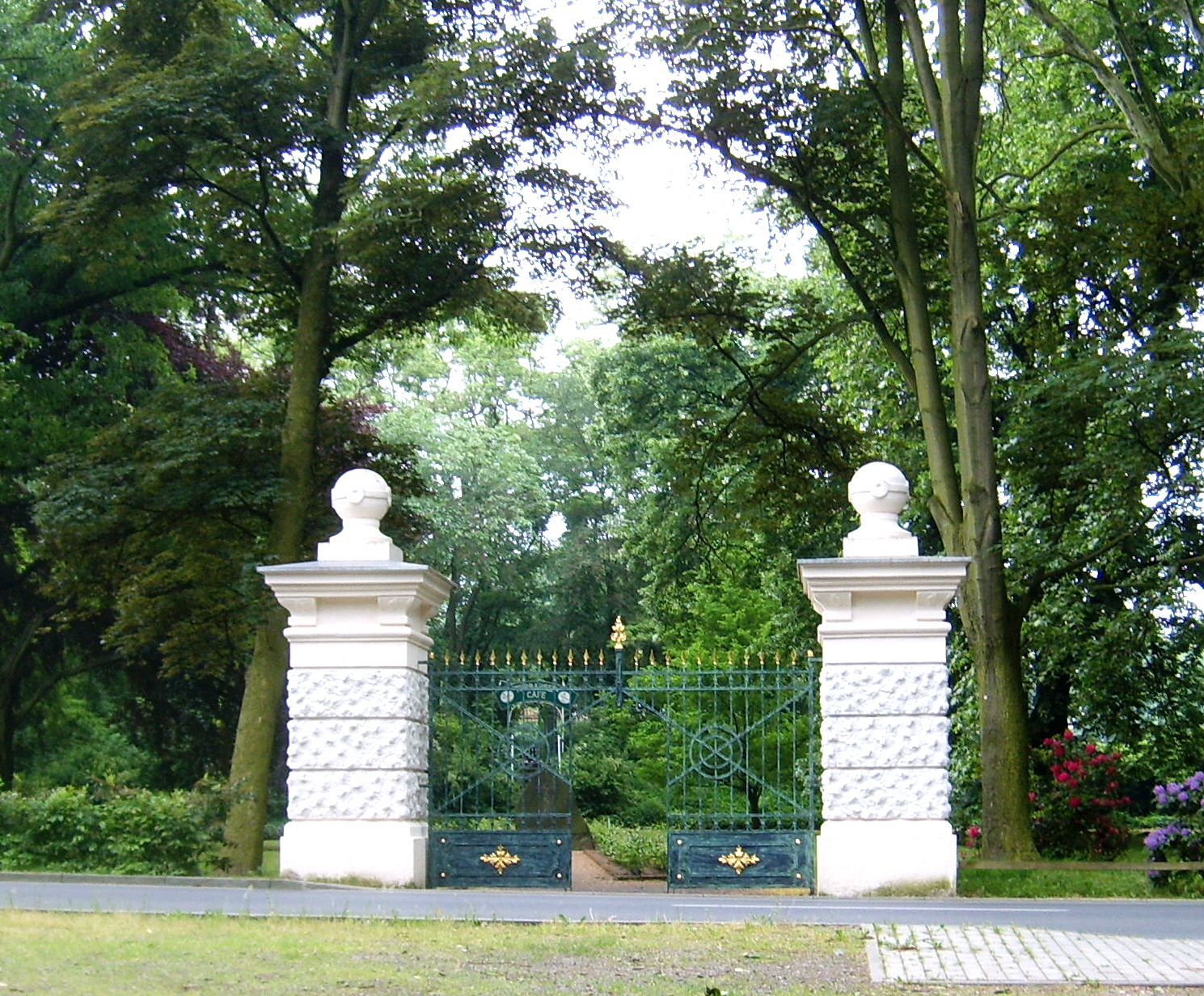
Entrance gate to the Saathain rose garden.

During the final stages of World War II, Saathain Castle was intentionally destroyed by fire in April 1945. This tragic event resulted in the loss of extensive archives containing historical records and files, valuable art treasures stored within the castle, and the old church records of the neighboring villages of Würdenhain, including entries of baptisms, marriages, and funerals dating from 1655 to 1812. Additionally, the 587-hectare estate attached to the castle was divided up during the land reform in the Soviet occupation zone. In the process, 489.91 hectares were distributed to a total of 281 individuals in the surrounding communities of Haida (72.83 ha), Reichenhain (124.80 ha), Saathain (181.33 ha), Stolzenhain (30.11 ha), Würdenhain (78.80 ha), and Kröbeln (2.04 ha).

A portion of the former estate park was transformed into a rose garden, boasting over 70 species of roses and approximately 5000 rose bushes, beginning in 1972. On the other side of today's road to Elsterwerda, a remnant of the old floodplain forests of the Black Elster has been preserved. This untouched section of riparian forest is known for its extensive population of protected wood anemones.

The burned-out remains of the castle's structure were largely cleared away, and a terrace was built on the remaining foundation walls. This terrace once hosted a summer café, which ceased operation around 2008. Subsequently, access to the café has been restricted, and signs have been posted indicating a "danger of collapse."

== Manor church ==
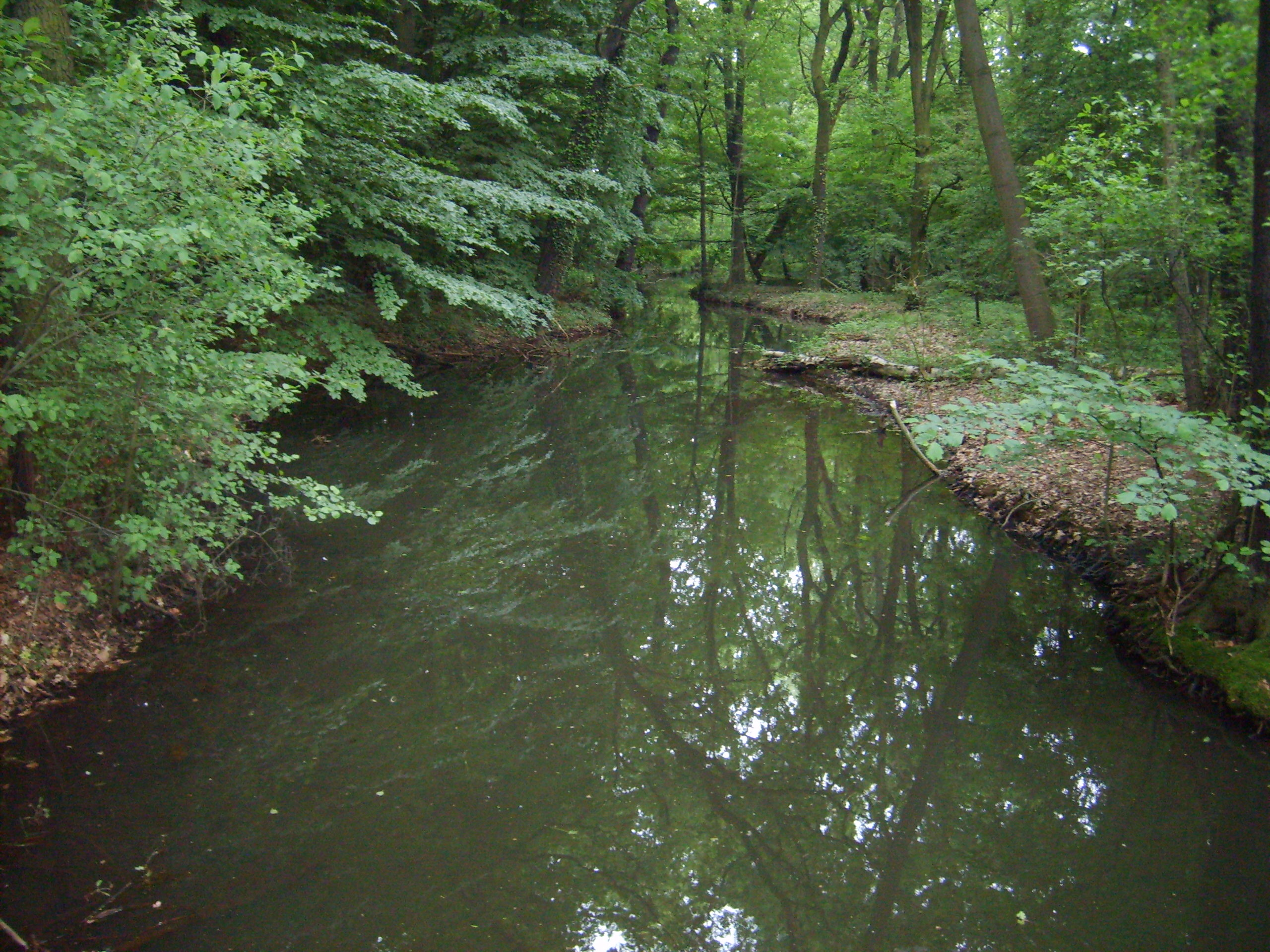
Rest of alluvial forest on the former Black Elster river near Saathain.

The half-timbered structure of the former Saathain manor church dates back to 1629 and was built on the grounds of a castle chapel mentioned in a document from 1575. Its present form, following a significant reconstruction, was finalized in 1816. This church achieved listed status as a historical building in 1968. After substantial renovation efforts, it was reopened to the public in 1990. The church and the adjacent estate, which has also undergone restoration, have emerged as cultural hubs within the municipality and the Elbe-Elster district. They host numerous concerts and exhibitions. Since May 2006, the historic half-timbered church has also become a venue for wedding ceremonies.

In front of the church is a memorial stone for the pastor and local historian Wolfgang Bastian, who worked there and saved the church from further decay in the mid-1930s with renovation measures and who died in Torgau in 1942 during interrogations by the Gestapo.

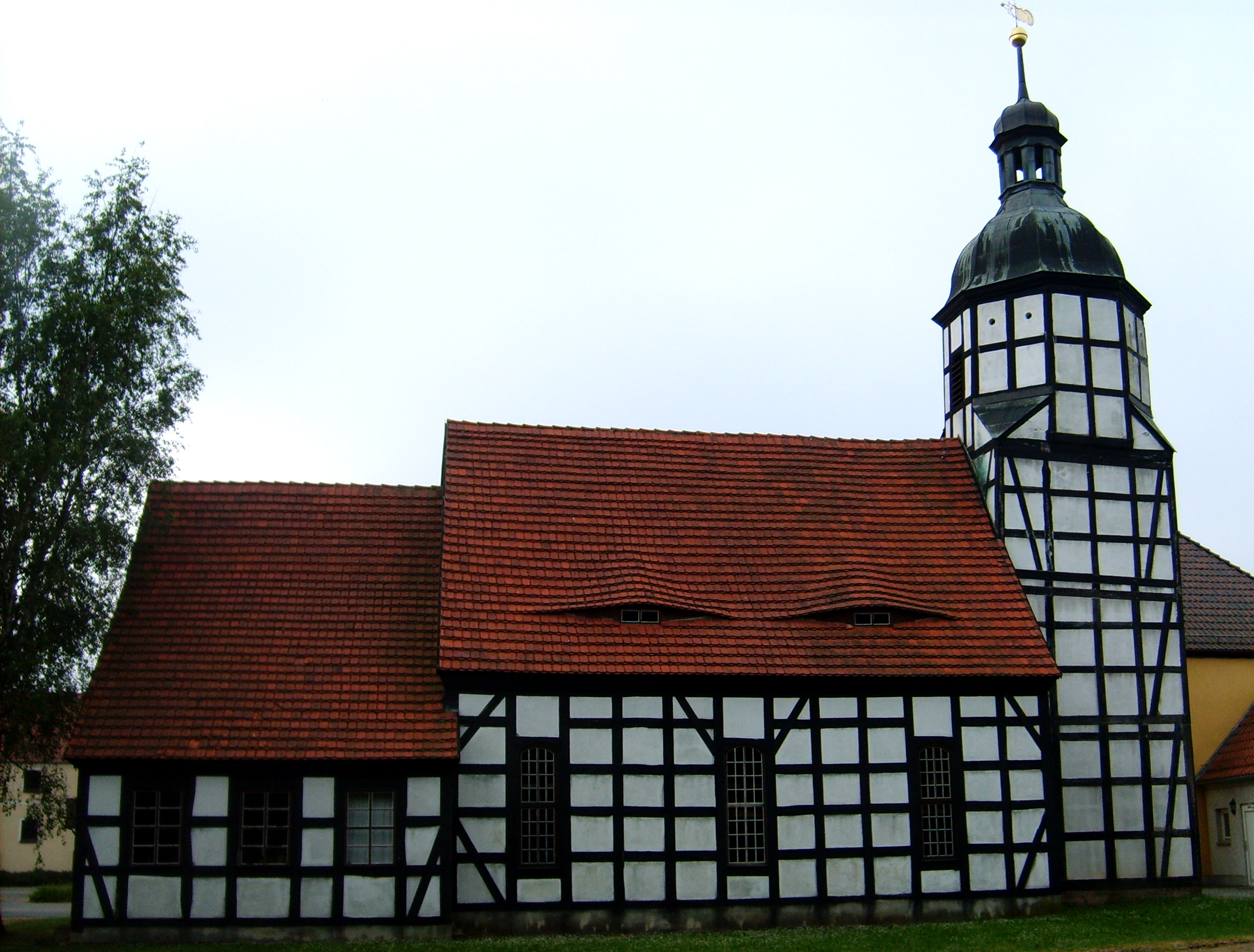
Half-timbered church in Saathain, Germany.

== Stone chronicle ==
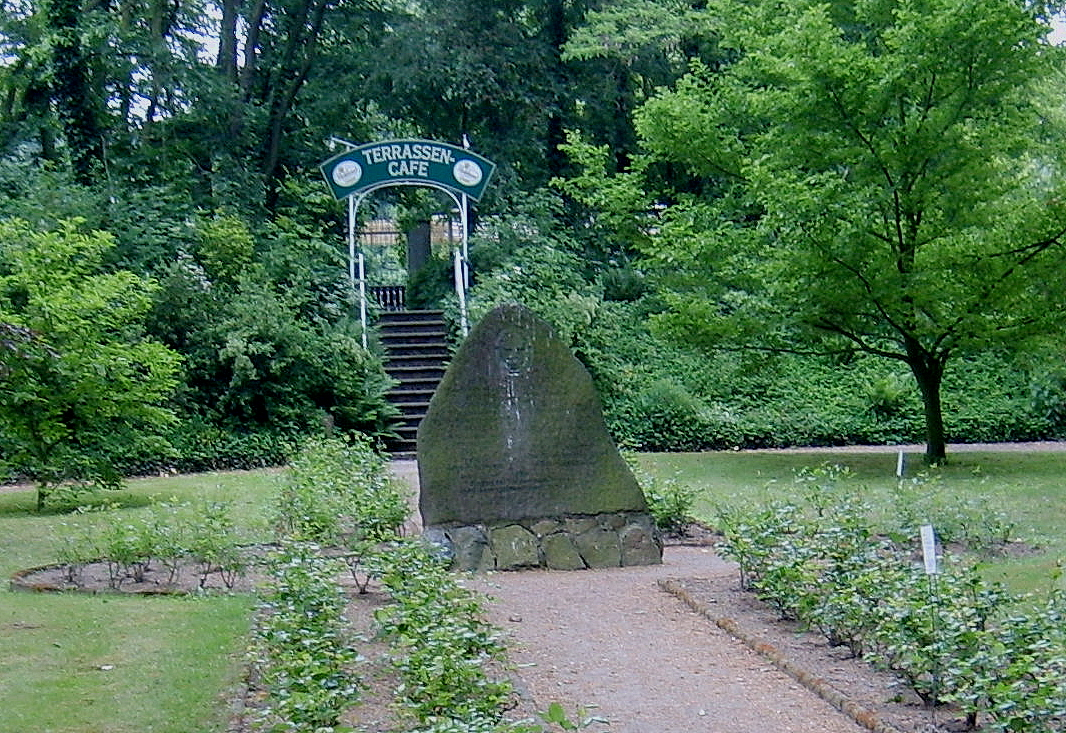
Chronicle stone in the castle park of Saathain.

In the castle park, in front of the remnants of the castle, stands a monument in the form of an uncut granite boulder bearing the village name, an oak tree, and a water lily. This monument was unveiled on 6 July 1958 to commemorate the water-rich Röderwald forest in the surrounding area. Below the monument are historical details about the village's development, contributed by Karl Fitzkow, who was the director of the Bad Liebenwerda District Museum at the time. The initiative for this memorial came from Saathain's former mayor, Heinz Dreißig, who served as the village's leader from 1951 to 1990. In recognition of his contributions, Heinz Dreißig received the German Prize for Monument Protection from the German National Committee for Monument Protection in 1991, the highest honor in this field in Germany.
