= Große Röder =

River in Germany

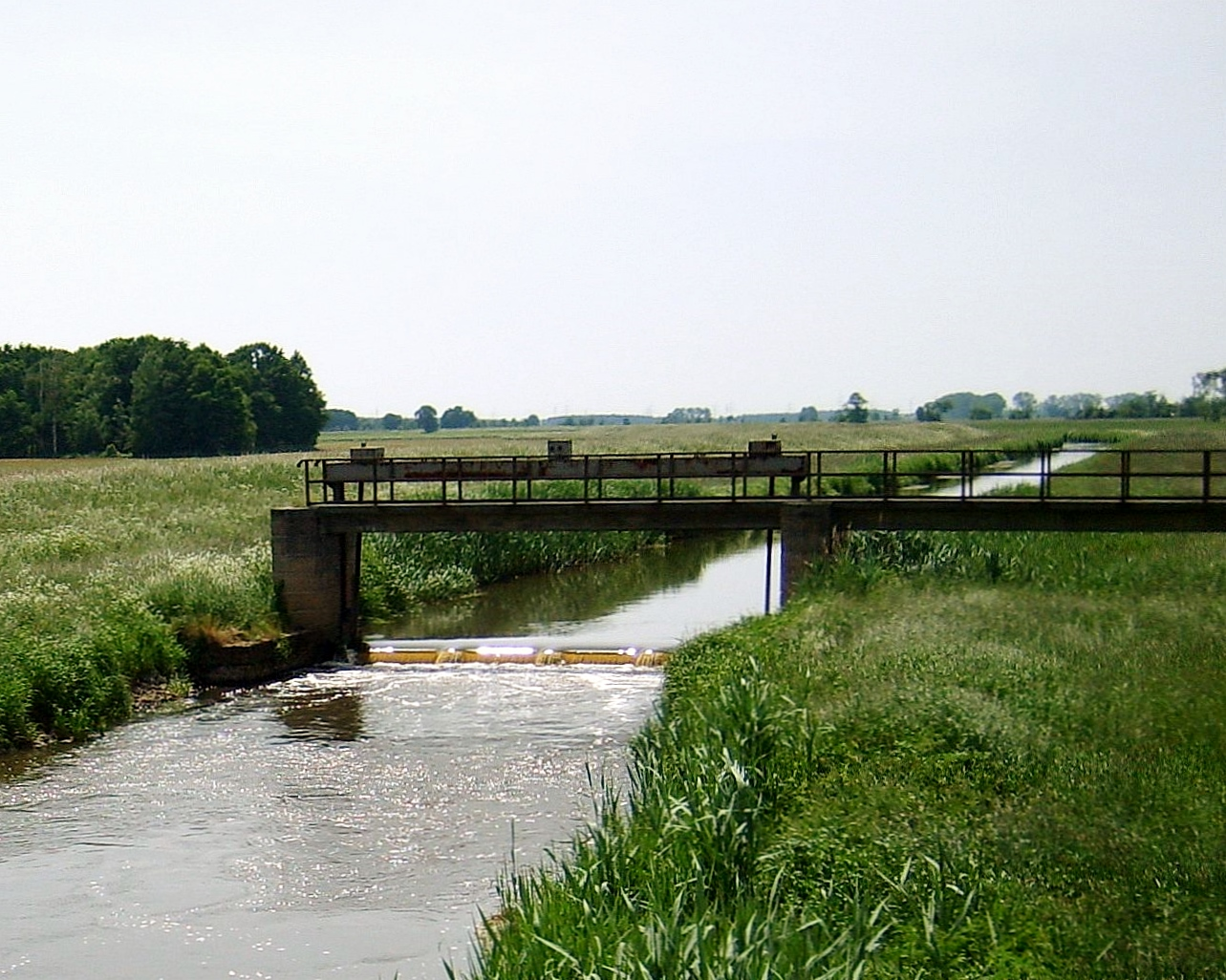
- The Röder river near Würdenhain (a district of Röderland).

Location
- Country: Germany
- States: Saxony and Brandenburg

Physical characteristics
- Mouth
  - location: Black Elster
  - coordinates: 51°28′29″N 13°27′59″E

Basin features
- Progression: Black Elster→ Elbe→ North Sea

The Große Röder is a river of Saxony and Brandenburg, eastern Germany. It is a left tributary of the river Black Elster. It rises near Arnsdorf, about 20 km (12 mi) east of Dresden. It flows in a generally northwestern direction, through the towns Radeberg, Radeburg and Großenhain. It joins the Black Elster in the village Haida (a part of Röderland), west of Elsterwerda.

== See also ==
- List of rivers of Brandenburg
- List of rivers of Saxony
