= Würdenhain =

Ortsteil of Röderland, Brandenburg

Würdenhain Röderland
- Ortsteil of Röderland
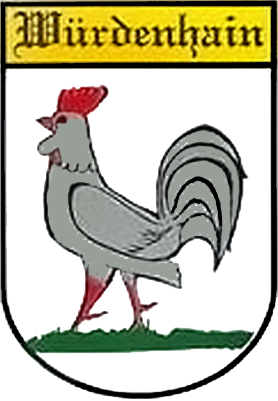
- Coat of arms

- Würdenhain (Brandenburg) Würdenhain's location in Brandenburg
- Coordinates: 51°28′30″N 13°27′30″E

Würdenhain is a district (officially Ortsteil) in Röderland, Brandenburg. It is the smallest district in the municipality, with 114 inhabitants.

There is evidence that there was a fortified complex in Würdenhain in the form of a castle or palace, which probably originated in the first quarter of the 11th century. The village itself was first mentioned in a document in 1346. In 1370, the dominion of Würdenhain was owned by Emperor Charles IV. The castle was destroyed in 1442 on the orders of the Saxon Elector Frederick the Gentle, as the Elector's Saxon vassal there was guilty of breach of the peace. The dominion was assigned to the neighbouring dominion of Mühlberg. When the area came to the Bohemian nobleman Hinko Birke von der Duba through barter and purchase transactions, it was noted in the deed of sale: "The Würdenhain Wall shall not be built upon or timbered for eternity".

After the Peaceful Revolution, Würdenhain and the surrounding villages of Haida, Prösen, Reichenhain, Saathain, Stolzenhain and Wainsdorf formed the municipality of Röderland on 26 October 2003.

== History ==
=== Name ===
The name Würdenhain means "Wooded Island" and is derived from Werder, meaning island and Hain, meaning forest.

=== Local History ===
Evidence shows that cavemen may have inhabited Würdenhain thousands of years ago. Ernst Voegler from Prieschka, who was a teacher in Würdenhain until the First World War, made several finds from the younger and middle Stone Age in the Würdenhain area, in addition to Bronze Age shards. In 1947, a 25 centimeter high urn and the remains of two bowls from the early Iron Age were found.

Its first documented mention is from a record in 1346.

The oldest building in the district is the Würdenhain Church. It has gone through many renovations since its initial building in the 15th century. In 1747 a redesign took place in which the south side windows were enlarged.

From 1952 to 1990, Würdenhain was part of the Bezirk Cottbus of East Germany.

== Geography ==
The district is located at the mouth of the Große Röder, in the north of the municipality of Röderland. The administrative seat of the municipality of Röderland, Prösen, is about ten kilometres southeast of the village.

The village lies about six kilometres west of the town of Elsterwerda and eight kilometres east of the town of Bad Liebenwerda in the south of the Niederlausitzer Heidelandschaft Nature Park, which covers an area of 484 square kilometres in the Elbe-Elster district and the Oberspreewald-Lausitz district. Its centrepiece, the Forsthaus Prösa nature reserve with one of the largest contiguous sessile oak forests in Central Europe, lies only a few kilometres north of Würdenhain in the former Liebenwerda Heath.

The town is surrounded by the Elsteraue landscape conservation area, which covers about 6011 hectares and is divided into three ecological spatial units, with the Elsteraue II sub-area including Würdenhain. One of the conservation purposes of the landscape conservation area is "the preservation of the area because of its special importance for nature-based recreation in the area of the spa town of Bad Liebenwerda." The area extends to the north-west of the town.

To the north-west of the town, the Alte Röder Nature Reserve, which covers about 80 hectares, extends along the course of the river Röder as far as Prieschka. Its conservation purpose is, among other things, to preserve and develop this area as a habitat for the Elbe beaver and other animal species whose existence is threatened. The Röder lowlands, which were placed under nature conservation as early as 1981, are home to one of the most consistent occurrences of the endangered Elbe beaver.

== Politics ==
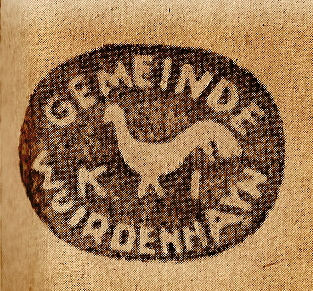
Former Würdenhain town seal, 18th-19th century

Since the merger of Würdenhain with the surrounding villages of Haida, Prösen, Reichenhain, Saathain, Stolzenhain and Wainsdorf on October 26, 2003, the district has been part of the Röderland municipality. According to the main statute of the municipality, Würdenhain is represented by the mayor and a three-person local advisory board. Frank Heelemann is the current mayor of Würdenhain.

=== Coat of arms and seal ===
The former coat of arms of Würdenhain can be described thusly: Under a golden shield head with "Würdenhain" in black fracture script in silver on a green grass strip, a red-armoured grey cockerel. In a first oval village seal from 1810, the cockerel was turned to the left. After the Congress of Vienna, when the village became part of the newly created Prussian district of Liebenwerda in 1816, a village seal appeared with the cockerel turned to the right. The letters KL stood for the district of Liebenwerda. The circumscription of the seal read: "GEMEINDE WUIRDENHAYN" (municipality of Wuirdenhayn). A cockerel was also on a wind vane made in Haida in 1825 for five thalers on the tower of the Würdenhain church, which was destroyed by a storm in 1972.

According to the statutes of the municipality of Röderland, the present-day district of Würdenhain does not have its own coat of arms.
