= Lower Lusatian Heath Nature Park =

Nature park in Brandenburg, Germany

Coordinates: 51°30′56″N 13°23′39″E

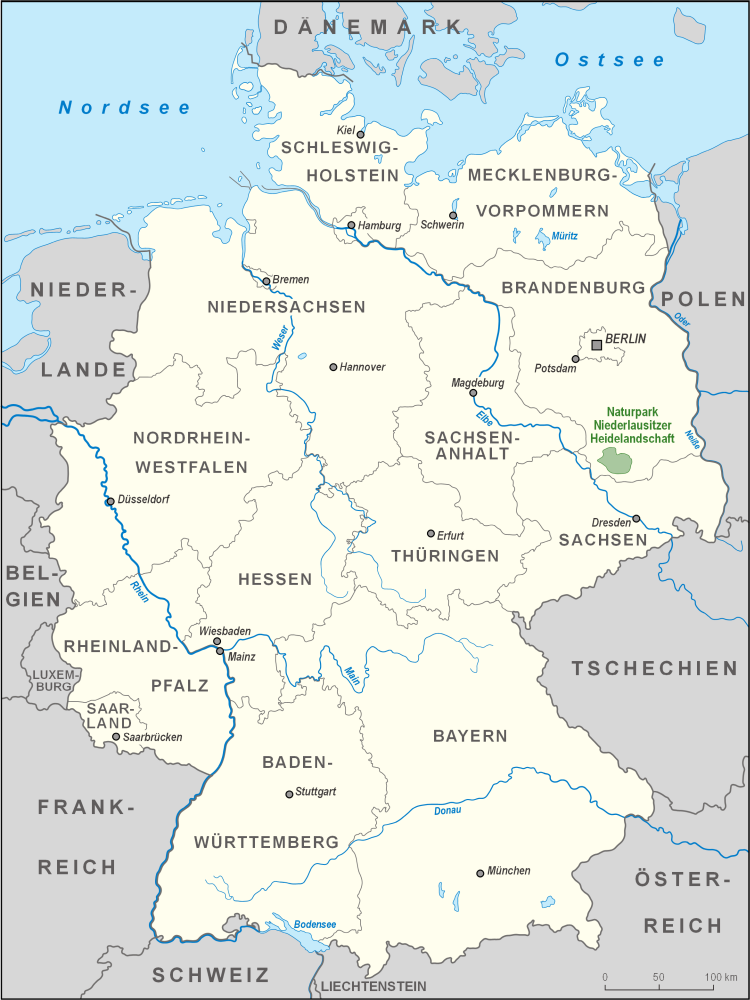

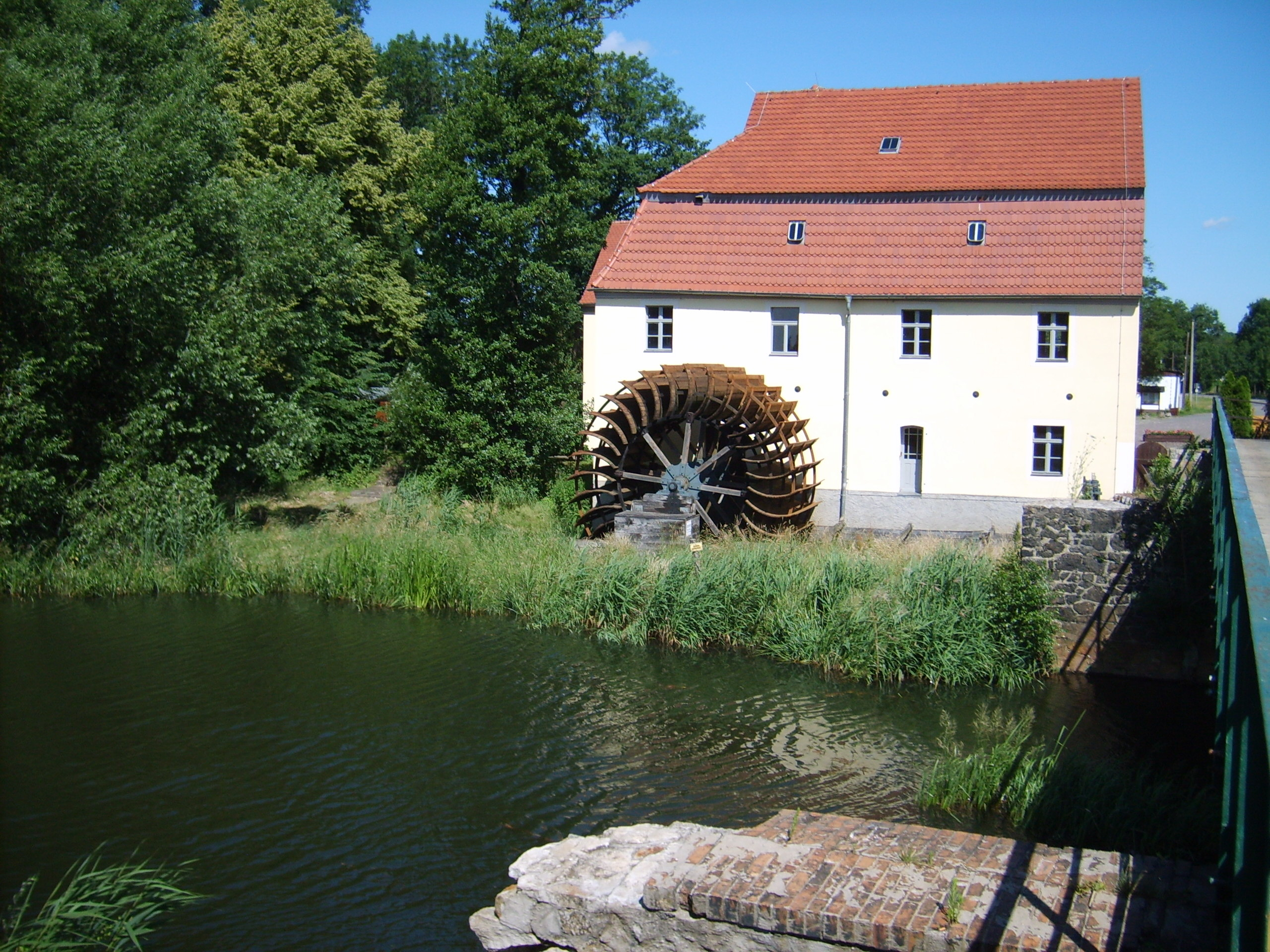
Watermill in Plessa

The Lower Lusatian Heath Nature Park (German: Naturpark Niederlausitzer Heidelandschaft; Lower Sorbian: Pśirodny park Dolnołužyska góla) is a nature park and reserve in the state of Brandenburg, Germany. It covers an area of 490 km^{2} (189 sq mi). It was established on May 24, 1996.

The south area, where Brandenburg's oldest landscape is found, was formed approximately 180,000 years ago at the end of the ice age, with its glacial valley. Among the ice-age deposits are massive coal layers. After extensive mining in the last hundred years, the landscapes have developed a unique appearance.There are valuable specialized habitats for animals and plants in many areas of the park.
