= Röderland =

- Municipality
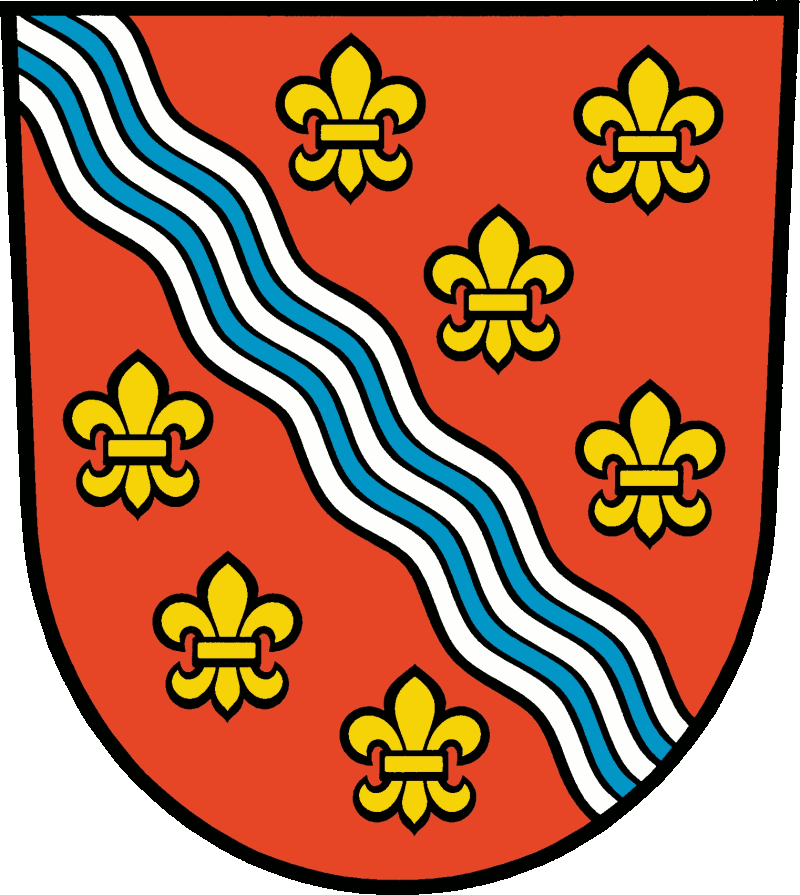
- Coat of arms

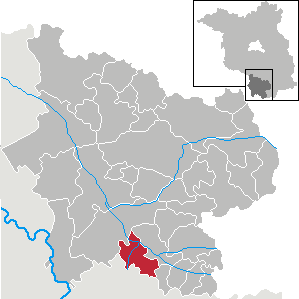
- Location of Röderland within Elbe-Elster district
- Interactive map of Röderland
- Location within Germany Location within Brandenburg
- Coordinates: 51°25′51″N 13°29′44″E
- Country: Germany
- State: Brandenburg
- District: Elbe-Elster

Government
  - Mayor (2019–27): Marcus Terne

Area
  - Total: 46.2 km^{2} (17.8 sq mi)
- Elevation: 90 m (300 ft)

Population (2025-12-31)
  - Total: 3,571
  - Density: 77.3/km^{2} (200/sq mi)
- Time zone: UTC+01:00 (CET)
  - Summer (DST): UTC+02:00 (CEST)
- Postal codes: 04932
- Dialling codes: 03533, 035341 (OT Reichenhain)
- Vehicle registration: EE, FI, LIB
- Website: www.gemeinde-roederland.de

Röderland (German pronunciation: [ˈʁøːdɐlant]) is a municipality in the Elbe-Elster district, in Brandenburg, Germany.

== History ==
From 1952 to 1990, the constituent localities of Röderland were part of the Bezirk Cottbus of East Germany. On 26 October 2003, the municipality of Röderland was formed by merging the municipalities of Haida, Prösen, Reichenhain, Saathain, Stolzenhain and Wainsdorf.

== Demography ==
Development of Population since 1875 within the Current Boundaries (Blue Line: Population; Dotted Line: Comparison to Population Development of Brandenburg state; Grey Background: Time of Nazi rule; Red Background: Time of Communist rule)

Recent Population Development and Projections (blue line); ; Official projection for 2024-2040 with three variants

Röderland: Population development
within the current boundaries (2025)

Year	Pop.	±% p.a.
1875	2,267	—
1890	2,434	+0.47%
1910	2,900	+0.88%
1925	4,010	+2.18%
1933	4,702	+2.01%
1939	5,405	+2.35%
1946	6,964	+3.69%

Year	Pop.	±% p.a.
1950	6,751	−0.77%
1964	5,929	−0.92%
1971	5,950	+0.05%
1981	5,542	−0.71%
1985	5,545	+0.01%
1990	5,400	−0.53%
1995	5,145	−0.96%

Year	Pop.	±% p.a.
2000	5,061	−0.33%
2005	4,705	−1.45%
2010	4,358	−1.52%
2015	3,957	−1.91%
2020	3,823	−0.69%
2025	3,571	−1.35%

== See also ==
- Saathain Castle
