= Abel Herzberg =

Dutch writer and poet

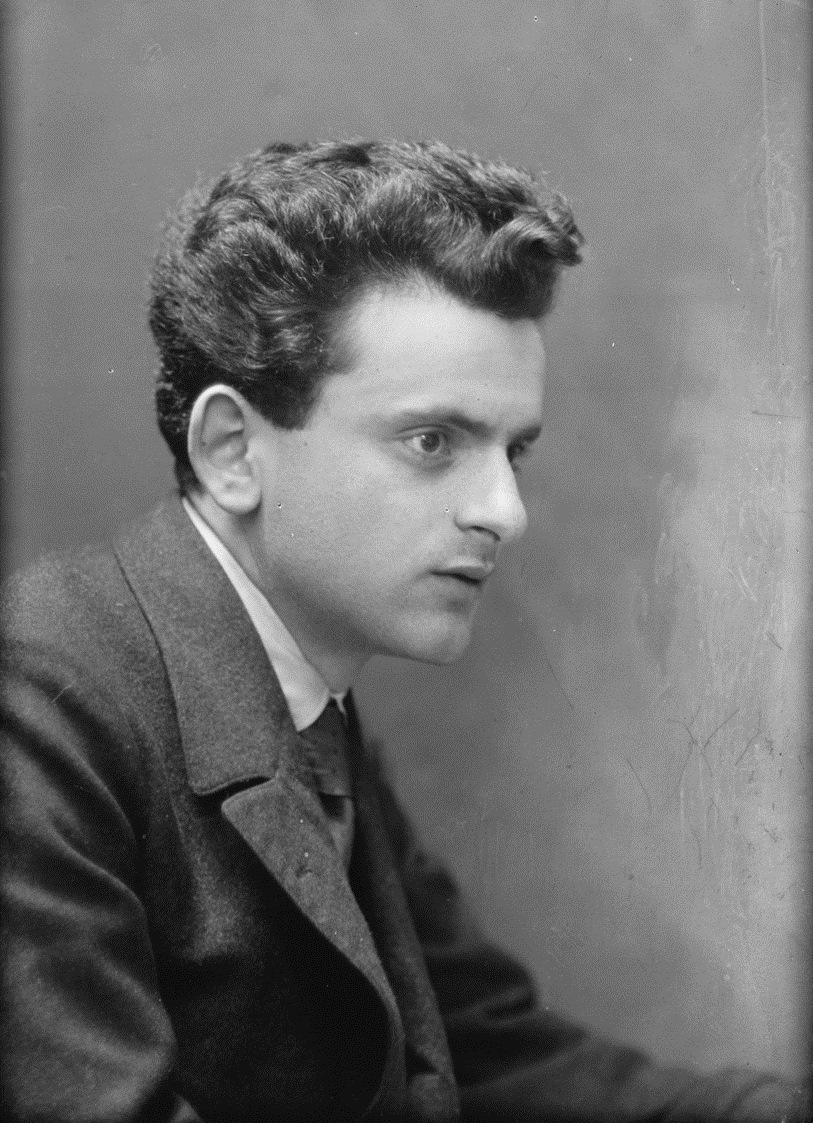
- Abel Herzberg in c. 1913
- Born: Abel Jacob Herzberg; 17 September 1893; Amsterdam, Netherlands
- Died: 19 May 1989 (aged 95); Amsterdam, Netherlands
- Occupations: Lawyer; writer
- Children: Judith Herzberg (b. 1934)
- Writing career
- Notable awards: Constantijn Huygens Prize (1964); P. C. Hooft Award (1972)

Abel Jacob Herzberg (17 September 1893 – 19 May 1989) was a Dutch Jewish lawyer and writer, whose parents were Russian Jews who had come to the Netherlands from Lithuania. Herzberg was trained as a lawyer and began a legal practice in Amsterdam, and became known as a legal scholar also. He was a Zionist from an early age, and around the time of the outbreak of World War II he attempted to emigrate with his family to Palestine. During the war he remained active in Jewish organizations until he was interned, with his wife, in Bergen-Belsen concentration camp, where his legal background and status as a legal scholar (which made him desirable to the Nazis in a possible exchange for Germans abroad) earned him a seat on a prisoners' court. After their captors moved them from Bergen-Belsen, he and his wife were later liberated by the Soviets and made it back to the Netherlands, where they were reunited also with their children. He continued his legal practice in Amsterdam, though he traveled to Palestine and was offered an administrative position in newly-founded Israel.

Herzberg had written a play before the war, and in Bergen-Belsen he began keeping a diary. After the war he began a career as a writer, his first publication, Amor fati, being a collection of essays on life in Bergen-Belsen. In 1950, he published a history of the persecution of the Jews as well as his diary of the camp; he is one of the earliest historians of the Holocaust. His published works include historical texts, journalism, diaries and autobiography, novellas, and plays.

== Biography ==
=== Early life ===
Herzberg was born in Amsterdam into a family of Russian Jews. His parents migrated from Lithuania, having been part of the exodus of Eastern European Jews of 1882–1914. Herzberg's father, a Zionist who traded in diamonds, was active in aiding Jewish migrants on their travels to the United States; the history of the Jews as well as the contemporaneous diaspora were frequently discussed in the family. Herzberg's father took the family to the Eighth Congress of the World Zionist Organization in The Hague, an important moment for young Abel, who later wrote about the experience of seeing the Zionist flag: "There, for the first time in my life, I saw a Jewish flag and I knew we weren't dreaming. All we had to do was wait forty years, forty bitter years".

Herzberg attended public (non-denominational) school since his parents valued integration, but he experienced hostility from the other children; upon his introduction, his classmates sang an antisemitic song and he experienced further prejudice at the Barlaeus Gymnasium. Religious education was provided by his parents, though he admitted to being very unobservant when it came to dietary law. His maternal grandparents were hasidic, and described their mysticism in Brieven aan mijn kleinzoon. After his final exams he traveled to Russia where he visited his grandfather. He witnessed first hand the poverty experienced by the Eastern European Jewry and the virulent antisemitism with which they lived. He was sensitive to misery, and subject to bouts of world-weariness; his religiosity, though, became mostly rationalised and abstract, especially since, contrary to his childhood expectations, the Messiah had not come: in 1915 he wrote Victor E. van Vriesland, "God is dead". Still, he had a religious consciousness, which he expressed ethically and morally.

=== Law school and Zionism ===
In 1912, Herzberg took up law at the University of Amsterdam. He was conscripted at the beginning of the First World War but could have avoided military duty owing to his Russian citizenship. As a result of his father's prompting, he served for three and a half years, and was stationed in Purmerend. During this time he became more involved with Zionism, particularly after the Balfour Declaration. He had joined the Dutch Zionist Student Organisation (NZSO) in 1912, and served in a number of administrative functions in Zionist organizations, including editorship of the NZSO's magazine, Hatikwah. With David Cohen, he ran the Dutch Jewish Youth Foundation (JJF).

In 1918, Herzberg obtained his doctoral degree in law from the University of Amsterdam, and in his dissertation posited that the Jewish people should have a homeland in Palestine. He settled in Amsterdam to practice law, became president of the local chapter of the Zionist union, and in 1922 became a Dutch citizen, giving up his Russian citizenship. He married Thea Loeb, whom he had met in the NZSO, in 1923. In 1930 he joined the national board of the Dutch Zionist Union (NZB), and the next year became editor of their magazine. From 1934 to 1937 he served as the organization's president, and proved himself a brilliant public speaker, capable of enthusing audiences regardless of education or class.

In Germany, Wilhelm Spiegel, the husband of his wife's sister, was shot by Nazis on 12 March 1933, which confirmed Herzberg's forebodings of the growing danger to European Jewry. In the play Vaderland (1934), he alludes to the murder of his brother in law and warns of violent Nazi antisemitism and the state of denial felt by many German Jews. The play features a Jewish medical professor at a German university who refuses to accept the reality of the murderous antisemitism of the new regime until he is warned by a Polish Jew, but is murdered before he is able to flee the country. German Zionist Kurt Blumenfeld invited Herzberg to move to Palestine in 1938, and he and his wife did indeed travel to Palestine and spent a month there in early 1939, but did not emigrate; Herzberg said in a later interview that they did not have the funds to acquire residency in Palestine.

=== Nazi occupation and imprisonment ===
Around the time of the German occupation, Herzberg and his family unsuccessfully attempted to escape to England. He continued to write about Jewish history for various Zionist magazines, and argued that the way to counter antisemitism is to fully accept one's Jewishness, even while he realized that the extensive integration of Dutch Jewry in the Netherlands made de-assimilation impossible. He continued to uphold the need for an awareness of an essential Jewishness, but found this less in knowledge, mysticism, or religiosity than in an atmosphere perceptible only for those who were receptive to it—an atmosphere he found most strongly in Palestine and Eastern Europe. He became editor of Het Joodsche Weekblad, a Jewish weekly published from April 1941 onwards by the Jewish Council of Amsterdam that mediated between the Amsterdam Jews and the Germans; his former JJF colleague David Cohen was co-president of the council. The Weekblad was the only Jewish publication allowed by the Germans, and in June 1941 he left, dismayed that Cohen exercised too much editorial control.

By 1940 he was in charge of a youth institution in Wieringen, where Jewish youngsters, mostly from Germany, were prepared for migration to Palestine, but the Germans closed this in 1941. Herzberg moved back to Amsterdam to run a newly-opened school for his pupils from Wieringen, but was filled with pessimism about the future. In June 1941, 61 of his 200 Amsterdam pupils were arrested; none of them returned from Mauthausen-Gusen concentration camp. Their names and addresses had been obtained from Cohen and others on the Joodse Raad; the Sicherheitsdienst had promised the students would be returned. The Herzbergs moved to Blaricum, and he contemplated going into hiding but soon realized he could not tolerate the psychological burden; nor could he stomach the thought of endangering others.

Herzberg and his wife were arrested in March 1943 and imprisoned in Camp Barneveld where prominent Jews were kept; Herzberg earned his status because commentary he had written on a liquor law proposed in 1932 had been published and become a standard work. He was not supposed to be deported; still, they were moved to Westerbork transit camp in September 1943, and their children fled into hiding. Because by now, belatedly and almost miraculously, Herzberg and his wife had received a permit to enter Palestine because of his work in the Zionist movement, he was allowed to choose emigration. They were imprisoned on 11 January 1944 in Bergen-Belsen concentration camp, which was to be their point of departure for Palestine. Bergen-Belsen was not a death camp: some of the prisoners were "select" Jews who were kept with an eye on their future value as exchange objects with other governments. Married couples were separated but were able to meet, and generally there was more food than in other camps. His legal background allowed him a seat on a prisoners' court, which dealt with matters among prisoners, typically theft. By the end of April, Herzberg and his wife were notified they would leave soon, but for unknown reasons they were left off the final list; as he said later this was his nadir, the greatest disappointment of his life.

Herzberg began keeping a diary in August 1944; it would be published in 1950. Toward the end of the war conditions deteriorated and food became scarce; on 9 April 1945 the last prisoners, including the Herzbergs, were put on a train, that was to be known as the Lost Train, and moved all over Germany until they were finally liberated by the Soviets near Tröbitz, on 1 May, where they were treated for typhoid. Against the odds both survived, and after two months were repatriated, arriving in Amsterdam on 30 June 1945. Their three children, including poet Judith Herzberg, likewise survived the Holocaust.

His daughter Judith later said that they were lucky to be reunited, but that her father spoke of nothing but the war, Palestine, and Zionism; for him, the question was how to cope with how humanity had become so debased, and how to continue to live meaningfully after mankind proved how deep it could sink: the problem was not so much guilt but rather the source of this evil.

=== Life after the war ===
On his return Herzberg joined the office of Rients Dijkstra (1902-1970), who had taken over part of his practice when Herzberg was imprisoned. Dijkstra owned half the shares of De Groene Amsterdammer, a magazine, and Herzberg suggested they report on the trials of Nazi war criminals; public responses to the trials led Herzberg, prompted by Dijkstra, to start writing down his own thoughts on the war, his experiences, and his treatment by the Germans: these essays were published in De Groene, and were later collected as Amor fati (1946), the first of many publications dealing with the war. His objective in Amor fati was not to indict the Germans, but rather to understand how Germany came to produce the Nazi war criminals, and to understand them as humans, in as much as they weren't just criminals.

While his two oldest children emigrated to Palestine, Herzberg himself did not, even though he was displeased with the situation in the Netherlands. It seems that in part his work and the family's financial situation kept him in Amsterdam; after the foundation of the country of Israel he traveled there and was offered a position in the country's administration (Peretz Bernstein, Minister of Trade, was a friend), but declined, unhappy with the work and the state of the country. He gave legal counsel to Abraham Asscher and Cohen, who were indicted by the Jewish Council of Honor on charges of collaboration as wartime leaders of the Jewish Council.

Meanwhile, his career as a writer was progressing. In Kroniek der Jodenvervolging ("Chronicle of the persecution of the Jews", 1950) he posited that Christian hatred of Jews did not come about because Christians thought the Jews killed Christ, but because Judaism produced Christ. Hitler, he suspected, may well have believed in the Jews having been the chosen ones, resulting in a jealousy he could not bear. In that same year his diary from Bergen-Belsen, Tweestromenland, was published. He continued to visit (and defend) Israel and attended the trial against Adolf Eichmann in 1961; he had met Eichmann in Bergen-Belsen, and published some fifty letters in de Volkskrant in which he reported on the trial. About Eichmann, he said:

He had the reputation of being one of the greatest murderers in history. But what does such a man look like? A little bitty man was brought in, one who, it seemed, was put on trial for having stolen a bicycle or blackmailed his neighbor for a few hundred guilders. Does this little sly fellow have millions of deaths on his conscience? Is that why we all came here, for this colorless, slightly grubby, and balding person?

He regretted two things about the trial: it should have focused not just on the physical destruction of the Jews, but more on the attempt to destroy Judaism as an ideal; and the trial should have investigated the role of the individual in the entirety of the system, rather than just one single individual. He agreed with the verdict, though he was not happy with it, and proposed that the Israelis drop Eichmann with a parachute from a plane over Bavaria, to hand him back over to the Germans: "you can have him". He returned to Israel for de Volkskrant during the Six-Day War in 1967, but by the turn of the decade had become more critical of the country; he positively loathed the government of Menachem Begin that followed the Likud victory of the 1977 Israeli legislative election.

== Authorship ==
Amor fati, a collection of essays on the war and the Germans, first published in De Groene Amsterdammer, won the Dr. Wijnaendts Francken-prijs in 1949. His diary, Tweestromenland, was published in 1959; an English translation (by Jack Santcross, who arrived in Bergen-Belsen on the same transport as Herzberg, and left it the same day) was published in 1997 as Between Two Streams: A Diary from Bergen-Belsen; the title is partly a reference to the "juxtaposition [of] the suffering of the Jews and the cruelty of the Nazis". Om een lepel soep ('For a spoonful of soup') consists of recollections from his career in law; a reviewer noted a memorable passage: "What has always stayed with me more than this is the image of an old judge who experiences the practice of law, in which he grew old, as something quite banal when he is forced to answer a human voice".

Herzberg was awarded the Constantijn Huygens Prize in 1964 and the P. C. Hooft Award in 1972 (his daughter Judith won the Constantijn Huygens Prize in 1994, and the P. C. Hooft Award in 1997). Since 1990, an annual lecture (organized by Trouw and the discussion center De Rode Hoed in Amsterdam) commemorates Herzberg and his legacy of Jewish humanism.

== Bibliography ==
Herzberg published plays, essays, a diary, historical writing, and novellas. His collected works were published in four volumes between 1993 and 1996.

- Vaderland (1934; play)
- Amor fati (1946; essays from Bergen-Belsen)
- Tweestromenland ("Between Two Streams", 1950; diary)
- Herodes, de geschiedenis van een tyran ("Herodes, the history of a tyrant", 1955; play)
- Sauls dood (1958; play, performed by Haagse Comedie, 1959)
- Kroniek der jodenvervolging ("Chronicle of the persecution of the Jews", 1960)
- Het proces Eichmann (1961; collected newspaper articles for De Volkskrant on the Eichmann trial)
- Eichmann in Jeruzalem (1962; monograph on the Eichmann trial)
- Brieven aan mijn kleinzoon ("Letters to my grandson", 1964)
- Pro-Deo. Herinneringen aan een vooroordeel (1969)
- Om een lepel soep ("For a spoonful of soup", 1972; recollections from his legal practice)
- De memoires van koning Herodes (1974)
- Drie rode rozen (novella, 1975: the main character, Salomon Zeitscheck, is the only one of his family to survive the Holocaust)
- De man in de spiegel (1980)
- Twee verhalen (1981)
- Brieven aan mijn grootvader ("Letters to my grandfather", 1983)
- Mirjam (1985)
- Aartsvaders (1986)
- Verzameld werk (collected works, 1993-1996: vol. 1 novels, stories, drama; vol. 2 autobiography; vol. 3 essays and speeches)
- Brief aan mijn kleindochter ("Letter to my granddaughter", written 1984, published 1996)
