= Jona Oberski =

Dutch writer (born 1938)

- Born: Jona Eliëser Joseph Oberski; 20 March 1938 (age 88); Amsterdam, Netherlands
- Occupations: Writer, nuclear physicist
- Notable work: Kinderjaren (1978)

Jona Eliëser Joseph Oberski (born in Amsterdam, 20 March 1938) is a Dutch writer and a nuclear physicist.

== Biography ==
In 1937, a year before his birth, his parents fled from Nazi Germany to the Netherlands and settled in Amsterdam. But during World War II the country was quickly occupied in 1940, and there remained no other route available than the one forced upon all the other Jewish families. The family was transported through Westerbork transit camp to Bergen-Belsen concentration camp in 1943. Oberski survived the war, but both his parents died. Oberski was on The Lost Train, a train heading East with no clear destination. The train was captured by the Red Army in Tröbitz.

He was taken care of by a foster family. He dedicated his first book Childhood (1978) to his foster parents:

For my foster parents
who had quite a time
with me.

— Amsterdam, 19 November 1977, 7 p.m.

After the war he went to school, passing the Gymnasium-B exam in 1956. Subsequently, he studied at the University of Amsterdam (1956–1964), specializing as a nuclear and particle physicist. Oberski is married, having three children. In 1962, he started to work for the National Institute for Subatomic Physics at Amsterdam.

== Memoir about Oberski's Childhood and Concentration Camp Imprisonment ==
In 1976–1977 Oberski joined a poetry workshop by Dutch poet Judith Herzberg, after which it occurred to him to write about his own experiences of the Nazi concentration camps. He described the events as seen through the eyes of a small child in his book Kinderjaren (Childhood), which was published in Dutch in 1978 on the advice of Herzberg. Translations have been published in Canada, Denmark, Germany, United Kingdom, Finland, Greece, Hungary, Indonesia, Israel, Italy, Japan, Croatia, Norway, Poland, Spain, USA, Sweden.

The memoir describes in fragmentary way scenes from his life growing up in Amsterdam, arrest by the Gestapo, time in the Bergen-Belsen camp, and liberation by the Soviet army from an evacuation train. Childhood was first published in Dutch in 1978, and was later translated into English by Ralph Manheim in 1983. It focuses on the adult author's recollections of a childhood spent surviving the Holocaust. What is particularly striking about the narrative style is that the language and descriptions mimic that of an innocent child, one that is unable to comprehend the true implications of what is happening around him.

The beginning section of the memoir is centered in Amsterdam–young Oberski indicates that there was growing anti-semitism and tensions around his neighborhood, implied through the Star of David sewn into his coat by his mother, and the grocer refusing to sell his mother goods. Eventually, the family is rounded up and deported by train, which the mother explains to the narrator as being a quick trip, demonstrating the innocence of the boy. They are first sent to the Westerbork transit camp and later deported to Bergen-Belsen concentration camp. At Bergen-Belsen, Oberski and his mother are held in one section of the camp while his father is assigned to a separate labor camp. While imprisoned, Oberski recalls encounters with older children who exploit his naivety. In one episode they persuade him to insult a German guard, placing him in danger. In another, the children discover a building filled with corpses, which they refer to as the “Dreadhouse.” As conditions in the camp deteriorate, Oberski’s father dies from malnutrition and exhaustion, which the narrator glosses over without much deliberation.

Near the end of the war, Oberski and his mother are forced onto a train intended tonevacuate the camp. The train’s destination remains unknown to the prisoners, but it is eventually abandoned by the German guards as the Red Army approaches (this became known as the Lost Train). The train is subsequently liberated. In the town of Tröbitz, Oberski’s mother is hospitalized with a serious illness, likely typhus, and later dies as a result of disease and the effects of trauma. Oberski struggles to understand his mother’s death, expressing his grief in childlike ways, such as throwing objects and refusing to eat. His caretakers attempt to shield him from the full reality of the loss. At the conclusion of the memoir, Oberski is taken in by a foster family in Amsterdam, the city where his family had lived before the war. The narrative ends with this return, suggesting a sense of closure while acknowledging the lasting trauma and grief resulting from his experiences. At the end of memoir, Oberski dedicates the story to his foster parents, writing: “For my foster parents who had quite a time with me.”

This memoir has drawn parallels between Binjamin Wilkomirski’s Fragments, another narrative which describes the Holocaust from the perspective of a child. Both Childhood and Fragments have similar depictions of childhood experiences in concentration camps and demonstrate the challenges of understanding traumatic memory from a child’s perspective.However, Wilkormirski, whose real name is Bruno Dössekker, was accused of writing a fictitious account, blending together various firsthand accounts of the Holocaust to inform his work. A discussion of how historians and readers can see the difference between a true account of the Holocaust through the perspective of a child and a fabricated one is found in Sue Vice’s research project, Children Writing the Holocaust.

Based on the memoir, in 1993 Italian film director Roberto Faenza made a film Jona che visse nella balena (Jonah Who Lived in the Whale). It starred Jean-Hugues Anglade (father), Juliet Aubrey (mother), Luke Petterson (young Jona) and Jenner Del Vecchio (older Jonah) with music by Ennio Morricone. The movie script was written by Oberski, Faenza and Hugh Fleetwood. Later this movie was published on DVD as Look to the sky. Translations were called Jonah Who Lived in the Whale and Jonah der im Wal lebte (German).

== Publications ==
- 1971: An alpha-deuteron correlation experiment on carbon with the multidetector BOL. Ph.D. thesis University of Amsterdam.
- 1978: Kinderjaren. Den Haag: BZZTôH. Autobiography as a child in Dutch.
  - 1978: Barneår. Translator: Kirsten Rahbek. København: Tiderne Skifter. In Danish.
  - 1978: Kinderjahre Translator: Maria Csollány. München: Heyne. Heyne Allgemeine Reihe 6648. Also Wien: Paul Zsolnay, 1980, and others in German.
  - 1978: Lapsuusvuodet. Translator: Heimo Pihlajamaa. Helsinki: Tammi. In Finnish.
  - 1981: שנות ילדות : נובלה [Shenot yaldut : Novelah (Childhood years. A novel)]. Translator: Chaim Isak. Tel Aviv: Schocken, 1981. In Hebrew.
  - 1982: Anni d'infanzia. Un bambino nei lager. Article on Italian Wikipedia. Translator: Amina Pandolfi. Milano: Mondadori, 1982 (Scrittori Jealiani; E Stranieri). Firenze: La Giuntina, 1996. Collana "Schulim Vogelmann". In Italian.
  - 1983: A childhood. A novella (later editions: Childhood). Translator: Ralph Manheim). London; Sydney; Auckland; Toronto: Hodder and Stoughton, 1983 and later. New York; London etc.: Penguin, 2014. Garden City, N.Y.: Doubleday, 1983. Toronto: Lester & Orpen Dennys, 1984. In English.
  - 1983: Anneés d'enfance. Translator: Philippe Noble. Paris: Mercure de France, 1983. Paris: Gallimard, 1992. In French.
  - 1984: Barneår. Translator: Tove Alkan. Oslo: Gyldendal, 1984. In Norwegian.
  - 1988: Lata dziecinstwa. Translator: Zofia Klimaszewska. Warszawa: Ksiazka i Wiedza, 1988. In Polish.
  - 1991: Παιδικά χρόνια [Paidika chronia] by Γιόνα Ὀμπέρσκι [Gióna Ompérski]. Translator: M. Ioannídou. Athéna: Dórikos, 1991. In Greek.
  - 1994: Jónás a cethal gyomrában. Translator: Mihály Falvay. Budapest: Makkabi. In Hungarian.
  - 1994: [Chairudofuddo] Translator: Toshiki Taguchi. Tokyo Kinema Junposha, 1994. In Japanese.
  - 2009: Masa Kanak-kanak. Translator: Laurens Sipahelut. Jakarta: Pena Wormer, 2009. In Indonesian.
  - 2017: [Piladina]. Odia. Translator: Mousumi Acharya, K.K. Mohapatra. Bhubaneswar, Odisha, India: Four Corners, 2017. In Hindi [?].
- 1995: De ongenode gast (translated title: The Uninvited Visitor). Den Haag: BZZTôH. Novel in Dutch.
- 1997: De eigenaar van niemandsland (translated title:The Proprietor of No Mans Land). Den Haag: BZZTôH. ISBN 9789055014446. Novel in Dutch.
- 2022: Strengel, Amsterdam, Ambo|Anthos, ISBN 9789026360992, 9026360991, OCLC 1343957247. Novel in Dutch.
- columns and articles in several Dutch magazines.
