= Zvi Koretz =

Greek chief rabbi (1884–1945)

Rabbi Zvi Koretz

Chief Rabbi of Thessaloniki
- In office 1933–1945

Personal details
- Born: Zvi Hirsch Koretz; 2 June 1884 Rzeszów, Austria-Hungary
- Died: 3 June 1945 (aged 61) Trebitz, Saxony-Anhalt
- Cause of death: Typhus
- Resting place: Tröbitz, Germany
- Citizenship: Greece
- Spouse: Gita Koretz
- Children: Arieh Koretz
- Education: Higher Institute for Jewish Studies

Zvi Hirsch Koretz (Greek: Σέβη Κόρετς; 2 June 1884 – 3 June 1945), also written as Tzevi or Sevi Koretz, was an Ashkenazi Jew who served as the Chief Rabbi of Saloniki's Jewish community from 1933 to 1945. His role as president of the Judenrat during World War II has been called into controversy, with many accusing him of being a Nazi collaborator.

== Biography ==
Koretz was born on 2 June 1884 in Rzeszów, Galicia, Austria-Hungary. He would study in the Higher Institute for Jewish Studies in Berlin, where he received a doctorate in philosophy and Semitic languages, writing his thesis on "The Description of Hell in the Quran and its Prototypes in Jewish Literature." Following this he would receive semicha from this same institution. In 1927 he would marry a woman named Gita, a fellow native of Galicia, in Hamburg.

In 1933 Koretz, an Ashkenazi Jew who followed a 'liberal tradition,' was made Chief Rabbi of Salonika, a Sephardic community that mostly spoke Ladino. His office was given, on the condition that he would be able to learn Ladino and Greek within three months, and after doing so he would begin to make a name for himself by working with the government on their behalf. His politicking would make him an ally to several prominent members of the military, government, and the King, among whom he would often make public declarations of support.

Despite his connections outside of the community, Koretz had many detractors due to him not practicing Orthodox Judaism and living lavishly. His first actions in office would make this apparent as his first priority had been to secure the community funds and establish a large salary for himself. His lack of familiarity with Sephardic traditions would result in much of the responsibilities normally held by the spiritual office being delegated to local rabbis. Because of these strained relations he would bring several Ladino newspapers to civil court in 1934 for defamation, rather than the Beth Din, for attacks against his taking a large personal salary and desecrating the Sabbath. His choice to forgo the Beth Din, would raise questions of whether the institution needed reform. While his predecessor focused the office on resolving matters of halacha for the community, his first communal acts would update census information for the government; this would go into effect in 1934 and would be the basis for neighborhood lists that would be handed over to the Nazis by Koretz.

He would receive letters of reassurance from General Metaxas that the Jewish people would continue to be welcomed in Greece during the 1930s and would successfully petition funding for two new Jewish schools in Salonika. In March 1937 Koretz was able to negotiate an additional 500,000 drachmas for the local Jewish schools, however in June the community adopted measures to dismiss educators due to the threat of bankruptcy.

Despite the personal criticisms and ongoing financial struggles of the community, he was chosen to continue serving as the Chief Rabbi in 1938 at the directive of General Metaxas.

=== World War II ===
World War II saw Greece thrust into the conflict as they were invaded in 1940. During this period Koretz would write an appeal to the American Jewish Congress, relating to the international community and protesting how the Axis forces bombed civilian targets, such as the local Hagia Sophia Cathedral, in air raids, as well as heavily affecting the poor Jews of the city. During the war he would also be called on by the Archbishop of Athens to assist in the memorial service for several Jewish military men who were killed during the conflict, notably among them being Col. Mordechai Frizis. Koretz would be honored as the first Jewish member of the Parnassos Literary Society following the memorial service.

After Greece was conquered, Koretz was to be charged by the Nazis for anti-German propaganda. He was arrested in Athens on 15 April 1941 and deported to Vienna where he was held in a gestapo prison for nine months. He was released the following January and would return to Salonika, where he continued to serve as Chief Rabbi of the community before being imprisoned again for coming into conflict with, then Judenrat president, Shabbetai Saltiel, despite the president previously approving him to continue serving the community.

Koretz would be released in 1942 at the insistence of local industrialists to take part in the negotiations to replace Jewish slave laborers with paid Greek workers. He was able to negotiate a deal where the Jews would be released from the camps in exchange for over 2 billion drachmas in ransom, an amount the Nazis considered the Jews liable for due to their participation in the Greco-Italian War. By liquidating the community's property, the cemetery in particular, they were able to successfully raise funds and free Jews who had been taken to do labor. That being said, because the Nazis had raised the demanded value and wealthier members of the community refused to provide the money the full demands were not met.

Koretz would use this new freedom to guide the community once more, issuing halachic guidance on how they might celebrate Passover, in April 1942, despite the ongoing famine the community was facing.

On 11 December 1942 Koretz was named Judenrat president, replacing Saltiel, he was the only remaining Jewish community leader who spoke German beside the former president, and would negotiate with the SS officers Dieter Wisliceny and Alois Brunner over how the deportations of Jews were to be done. He would also act against members of the Greek resistance, threatening to expose members who attempted to recruit young Jews.

In the face of growing pressure from the Nazis, Koretz met with Prime Minister Rallis when the Greek official visited the city on 11 April 1943. Minister Rallis remained evasive on the issue of deportations despite the rabbi breaking down in tears before him and asking him to intervene on the Jewish citizens' behalf. Rallis would claim that the deportations were out of his control.

In August 1943, Koretz, the other members of the Judenrat, and the Jewish police were deported to Bergen-Belsen.

Koretz would be liberated from the Nazis by the Red Army on 23 April 1945 when the Soviets captured a train that was stranded in Tröbitz while transporting Jews from Bergen-Belsen to Theresienstadt, this train would become known as The Lost Transport. He would die later, in June, from typhus, which he had contracted in the concentration camp, in Trebitz. He was buried in the Tröbitz cemetery alongside other victims of The Lost Transport. His remains were exhumed, taken to Israel and interred there in 2000.

He was survived by his wife, Ghita Sarig Zweigel (1897–1988), son Arieh (1928–2016) and daughter Lilly (b. 1939).

== Legacy ==
Koretz's role in the deportation and murder of Salonika's Jewish community has been one of contentious debate. At least 94% of Salonika's Jewish population was murdered during the Holocaust, a figure that many have claimed was caused by the rabbi's actions during the deportations. These accusations would be primarily driven by survivors who accused him of being a collaborator due to his pushing the community to comply with the Nazi occupiers.

Some scholars have labeled Koretz as a collaborator and persecutor for having helped facilitate the deportations, handing over lists of Jews, and working to get the community to comply with the deportations. He would also tell the community that the deportations only meant that they would be relocating to German-occupied Poland, where the Jews would be settled with a new life and work. Others however have labeled him an unintentional collaborator, calling the outcome a tragedy of weak leadership.
