= Amerongen (surname) =

(Van) Amerongen is a Dutch toponymic surname, meaning "from Amerongen". Notable people with the surname include:

- Gerard Amerongen (1914–2013), Canadian politician and lawyer
- Jerry Van Amerongen, American cartoonist
- Martin van Amerongen (1941–2012), Dutch journalist, publisher, and writer
- Otto Wolff von Amerongen (1918–2007), German businessman
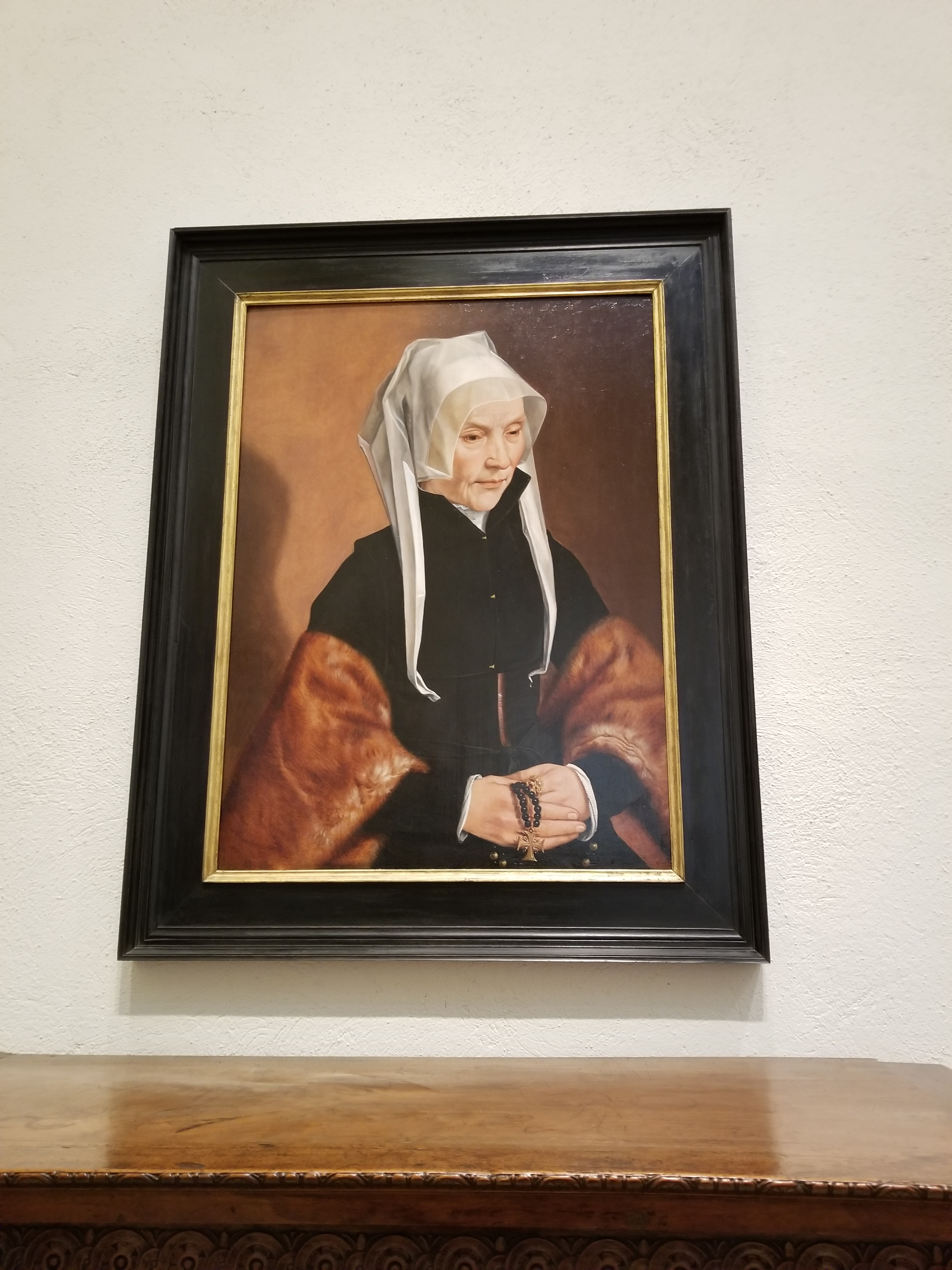
- Portrait of Sophia van Amerongen, circa 1550, attributed to Maarten van Heemskerck, Philadelphia Museum of Art
  Sophia van Amerongen (circa 1550), subject of a portrait, oil on panel, in the Philadelphia Museum of Art attributed to Maarten van Heemskerck (1498–1574)
