= Levie Vorst =

Dutch rabbi (1903–1987)

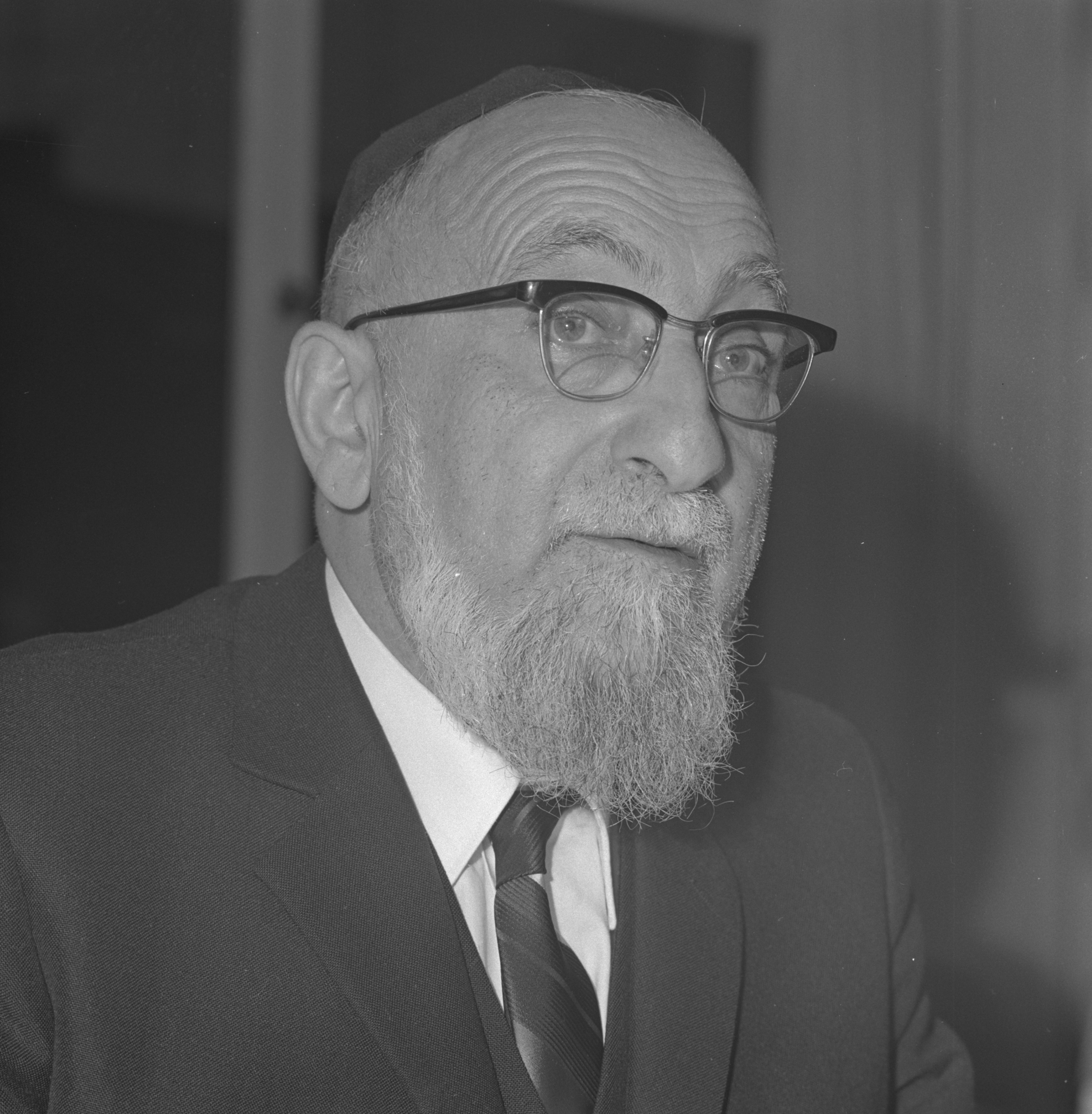
Chief rabbi L. Vorst (1970)

Rabbi Levie "Lou" Vorst (Hebrew: לוי וורסט; October 8, 1903 – July 28, 1987) was a Dutch rabbi of Rotterdam from 1946 to 1959 and chief rabbi from 1959 to 1971.

Vorst was born in Amsterdam in 1903. He and his family were transported to Bergen-Belsen concentration camp in January 1944. On 9 April 1945, they were put on the so-called Lost Train, a train heading East with no clear destination. The train was captured by the Red Army in Tröbitz. Levie survived, however his wife Henriëtte died along the way, and was buried near the railroad tracks.

Vorst served under caretaker chief rabbi Justus Tal from Amsterdam from 1946 to 1954 and under hakham Rodrigues Pereira from 1954 to 1959. In 1959 he became chief rabbi of Rotterdam. In 1971 he emigrated to Israel.

Vorst died in Rehovot in 1987.
