= The Lost Train =

Train transporting Nazi prisoners in 1945

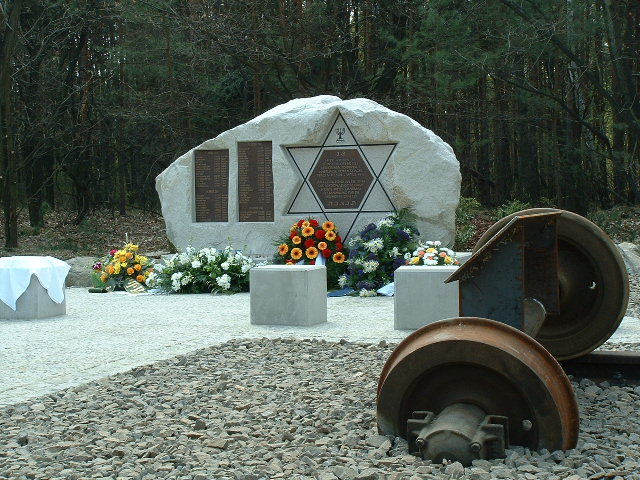
Memorial located in Schipkau, where the train stopped for 2 days.

The Lost Train (German: Verlorener Zug) also known as "The lost Transport" (German: Zug der Verlorenen), was the third of three trains that were intended to transport prisoners from the Bergen-Belsen concentration camp to Theresienstadt during the final phase of World War II as Allied troops approached the camp. The train was halted from further progress by the destroyed railway bridge at the Black Elster river near Tröbitz. The Jewish prisoners were discovered and freed by the Red Army.

== History ==
During the last weeks of World War II, the SS transported Jewish concentration camp prisoners on trains from Bergen-Belsen to Theresienstadt as the Allied front pushed closer to the concentration camp. Between 6 and 11 April 1945, three transport trains with a total of around 7,500 people, deemed Austauschjuden ("exchange Jews") by the SS, were selected to be taken to the other camp. The selection was based on Jews who had held a high position, and could be exchanged for German prisoners of war. About one-third were Dutch Jews. The prisoners from Bergen-Belsen concentration camp were put on three trains to be transported to Theresienstadt.

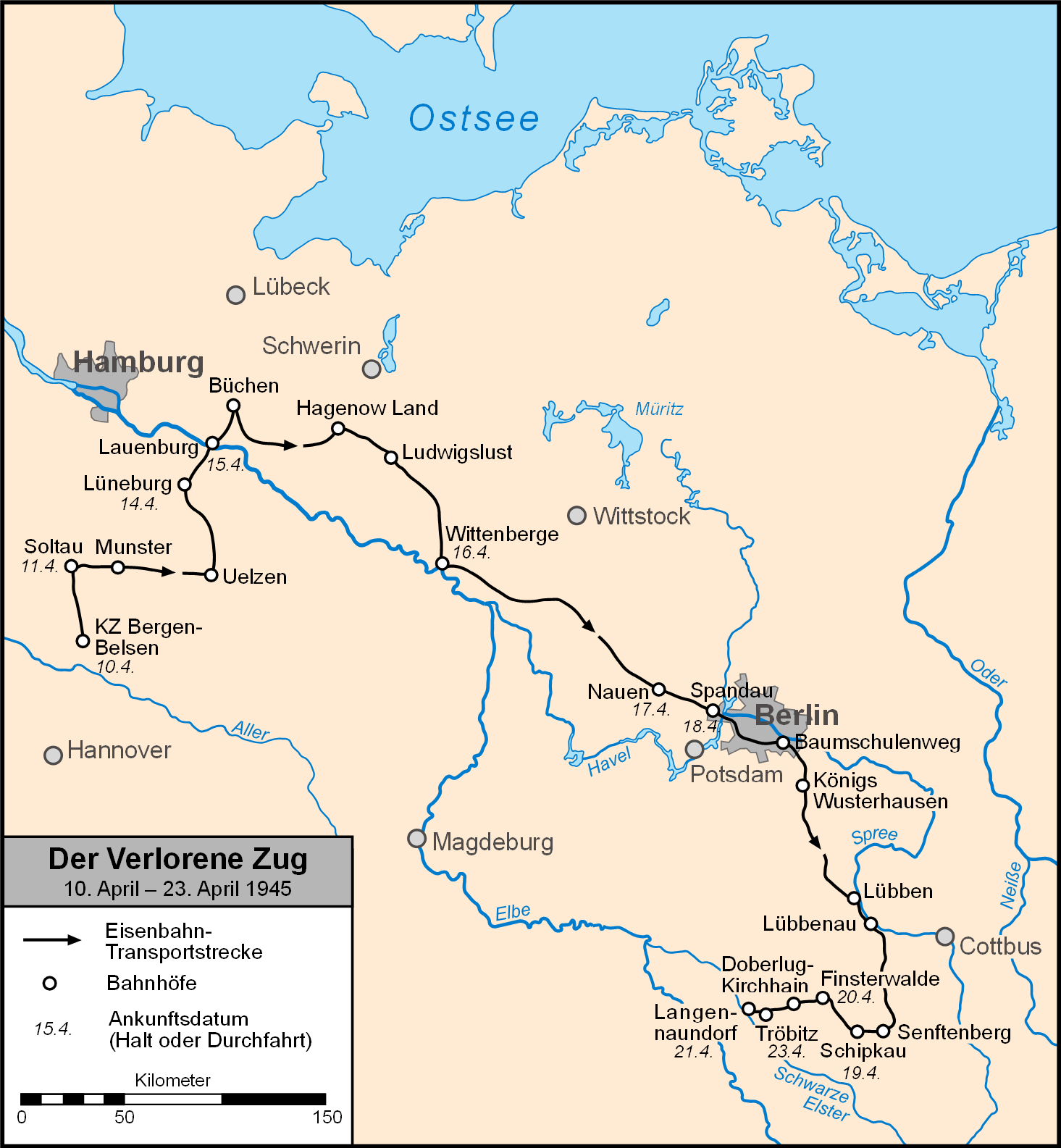
Planned route of the Lost Train

Only one train reached Theresienstadt, due to a railway bridge blowing up outside of Tröbitz by allied bombing preventing the third train from completing the trip. The first was freed by American troops at Farsleben a few days after departing Bergen-Belsen while the second reached Theresienstadt. The third transport would be the one known as the Lost Train. Once Theresienstadt was no longer reachable for the train, the guards fled the train, which was holding around 2,500 people; abandoning it outside of Tröbitz.

It was not until 23 April that the Red Army discovered and freed the prisoners. Gradually, the guards abandoned the prisoners as Allied forces approached, leaving the Russians to discover a train car filled with the bodies of those dead and close to death, with several additional prisoners seeking shelter in nearby abandoned houses. Of the prisoners, 198 were already dead from malnutrition and disease; 320 more would die due to complications from exhaustion and disease. It was reported by the female survivors that some Soviets who rescued them had raped many of them.

Unlike the other trains that attempted to relocate Nazi prisoners, this event had some unique characteristics. It was one of the few trains that carried exclusively Jewish prisoners; many of the prisoners on board possessed purchased passports of foreign countries; and the German Jews were listed as stateless under their nationality.

The survivors included Hannah Goslar, her sister, Abel Herzberg, Jaap Meijer, and his two-year old son Ischa Meijer, Jona Oberski, Clara Frances-Heertjes and Levie Vorst.

One of the prisoners in the Lost Train who did not survive was composer Robert Emanuel Heilbut. He died of typhus on the 22nd of April 1945. His notebooks with sheet music and lyrics survived though: more than 36 songs about his experiences in Amsterdam, Westerbork and Bergen-Belsen were saved.

== Legacy ==
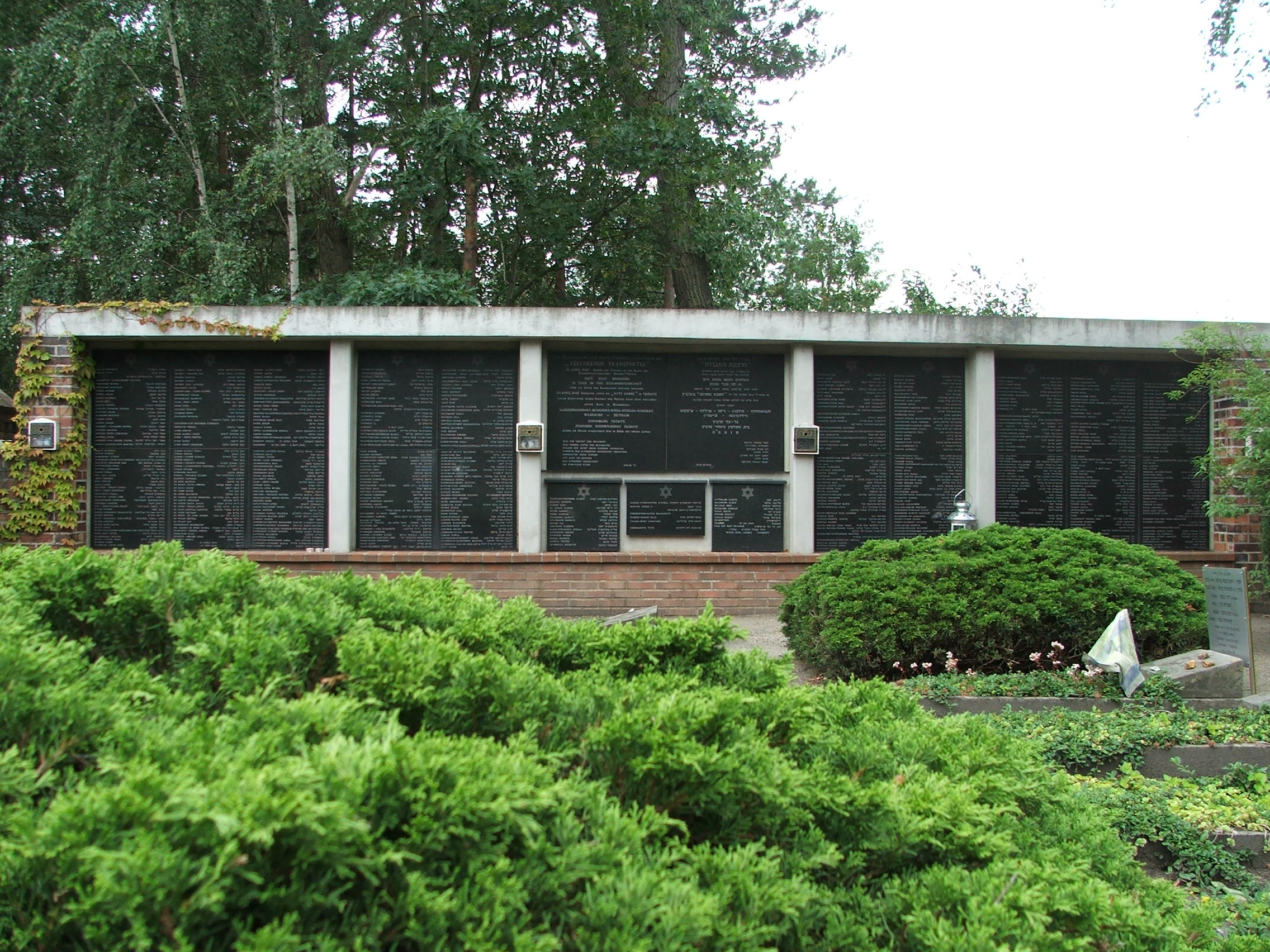
A list of victims of the Lost Train at the Tröbitz Holocaust memorial.

In 2015, the Brandenburg State Secretary for Culture, Marin Gorholt, the residents of Tröbitz began commemorating the lives of the lost immediately after the end of World War II. She made these comments while unveiling a €78,000 exhibit on the Lost Train. This was just one of several monuments and Jewish cemeteries commemorating the numerous victims of the Lost Train, in Tröbitz and other surrounding villages.

The deaths would also be memorialized by Christian groups who set up a hiking trail along the final train's route.
