= Kingdom of Holland =

Puppet state of Napoleonic France (1806–1810)

Kingdom of Holland: Koningrijk Holland (Dutch) (Note: In modern day Dutch this would be Koninkrijk Holland. Using the Siegenbeek spelling used at the time the official spelling was Koningrijk.); Royaume de Hollande (French)
- 1806–1810
- Flag Coat of arms
- Motto: Eendragt maakt magt (Dutch) (Note: Eendracht maakt macht in modern Dutch) "Unity makes strength"
- Status: Client state of the French Empire
- Capital: The Hague (1806–1808); Utrecht (1808); Amsterdam (1808–1810)
- Common languages: Dutch, French, Low German, Frisian
- Religion: Protestantism, Catholicism
- Demonym: Hollander
- Government: Monarchy
- King of Holland
  - 1806–1810: Louis I
  - 1810: Louis II
- Grand Pensionary
  - 1806: Carel de Vos van Steenwijk

Establishment
- Historical era: Napoleonic era
  - Kingdom proclaimed: 5 June 1806
  - Annexed by France: 9 July 1810
- Currency: Dutch guilder
Preceded by	Succeeded by
Batavian Republic; Kingdom of Prussia	First French Empire
- Today part of: Netherlands; Germany

The Kingdom of Holland (Note: Dutch: Koningrijk Holland (contemporary), Koninkrijk Holland (modern); French: Royaume de Hollande) was the short-lived successor state of the Batavian Republic. It was created by Napoleon Bonaparte in March 1806 in order to strengthen control over the Netherlands by replacing the republican government with a monarchy. Since becoming emperor in 1804, Napoleon sought to extirpate republican sympathy in territories France controlled, and placed his third brother, Louis Bonaparte, on the throne of the puppet kingdom. In 1807, the adjacent German regions of East Frisia and Jever were added to the kingdom.

In 1809, after the Walcheren Campaign, Holland had to surrender all territories south of the River Rhine to France. Also in 1809, Dutch forces fighting on the French side participated in defeating the anti-Bonapartist German rebellion led by Ferdinand von Schill, at the Battle of Stralsund.

King Louis did not perform to Napoleon's expectations – he tried to serve Dutch interests instead of his brother's – and the kingdom was dissolved in 1810, after which the Netherlands were annexed by France until 1813. Holland covered the area of the present-day East Frisia (northwest Germany) and Netherlands with the exception of the province of Limburg, and parts of Zeeland, which became annexed and incorporated into greater France. It was the first formal monarchy in Dutch territory since 1581, when most of it was under the Spanish crown (Spanish Netherlands).

== Coat of arms ==
Napoléon's brother Louis Bonaparte was installed as 'King of Holland' on 5 June 1806. Originally the arms of the new kingdom were to be like those of the Kingdom of Italy: an eagle bearing a shield, with the arms of the United Netherlands, the lion, now royally crowned. In December 1806, in Paris, A. Renodi designed arms quartering the Napoléonic eagle with the lion of the United Netherlands. Around the shield was the French Order of the Grand Eagle. Behind the shield are crossed sceptres, typical for Napoleonic heraldry, and above the shield, Napoleon's star.

A few months later, on 20 May 1807, King Louis – now called "Lodewijk" – altered these arms, adding a helmet, leaving out his brother's star, and replacing the Grand Eagle with his own Dutch Order of the Union and the old Dutch devise "Unity makes strength" around the shield. Exemplary for the innovation in Napoleon's heraldry are the two hands coming out of clouds from behind the shield holding swords, designating King Louis as Connétable de France (Constable of France).

== History ==
=== Preface ===
The Batavian Republic adopted in October 1801 a new constitution which was more moderate than its predecessor and the Republic was renamed to the Batavian Commonwealth, to make it less revolutionary. In the Commonwealth, the old provinces received more autonomy at the expense of the central government in The Hague and a Staatsbewind of twelve persons was installed to govern the country. At that time Napoleon Bonaparte was already criticizing the lack of executive authority in the Dutch state. A new constitution was drafted by Rutger Jan Schimmelpenninck in March 1805 which reinstated the unity state. Schimmelpenninck was installed as Grand Pensionary of the Batavian Republic. With these changes, the republic became more centralised than before and maintained its republican character.

Napoleon remained troubled by the instability of the Batavian regime. He attributed this to its political organization and the weak position of the Grand Pensionary. In his eyes, only a monarchy could "prevent either the country succumbing to British pressure, or the Dutch continuing to long for a return to the old regime." Besides this, the Dutch did not live up to their military duties and Schimmelpennick was not a very docile ally.

In February 1806 it became clear Schimmelpenninck's days were numbered. In the years before 1806, Napoleon had transformed the former Sister Republics of the French Republic into kingdoms for his family. The Italian Republic was transformed into the Kingdom of Italy with Napoleon as its king. Joachim Murat became Grand Duke of Berg and Joseph Bonaparte received the established Kingdom of Naples. In early 1806 the Swiss Confederation and the Batavian Republic were the last remaining Sister Republics.

Schimmelpenninck objected to the idea of a regime change. According to him a hereditary head of state was incompatible with the Dutch national character. Napoleon presented on 28 April 1806 an ultimatum to the Dutch diplomats: they had eight days to accept Louis Bonaparte as their king. The majority of the members of the government ratified the treaty without popular consultation. With this Napoleon created a facade of legitimacy. The transition of a republic to a monarchy had actually already been prepared by the one-man rule of Schimmelpenninck.

=== Louis Bonaparte assumes office ===
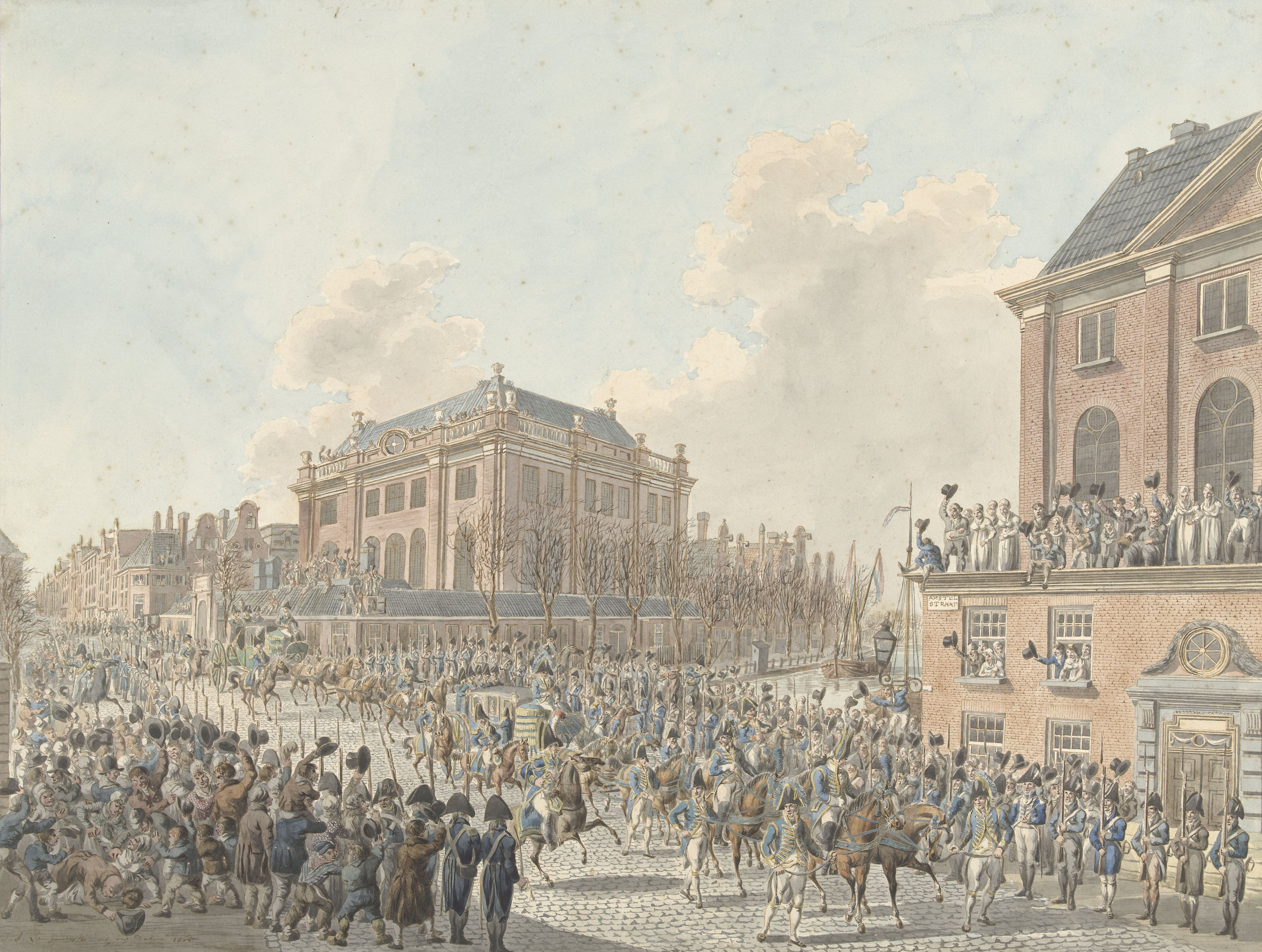
Louis Bonaparte arriving in Amsterdam on 20 April 1808

In May 1806 the Treaty of Paris was written and it stipulated that it became time to strengthen the weak Dutch nation. For this, the country gained a hereditary prince who had the primary task of promoting national reconciliation and flourishing national prosperity. In the treaty, Napoleon also confirmed the country's independence. On 23 June 1806 Louis Napoleon made his entrance in The Hague. Louis Napoleon was never crowned as king of Holland and problems with his sovereignty would haunt him during his entire reign. Shortly after his arrival, Louis Napoleon appointed three members of the Council of State to draft a new constitution for the new monarchy.

With Louis Napoleon on the Dutch throne the Kingdom of Holland the country participated in the War of the Fourth Coalition. After the victory of the Battle of Jena-Auerstedt Louis hoped he could enlarge his kingdom with parts of Westphalia and the Grand Duchy of Berg. The kingdom only gained the territories of East Frisia and Jever in North Germany.

=== Louis the Good ===
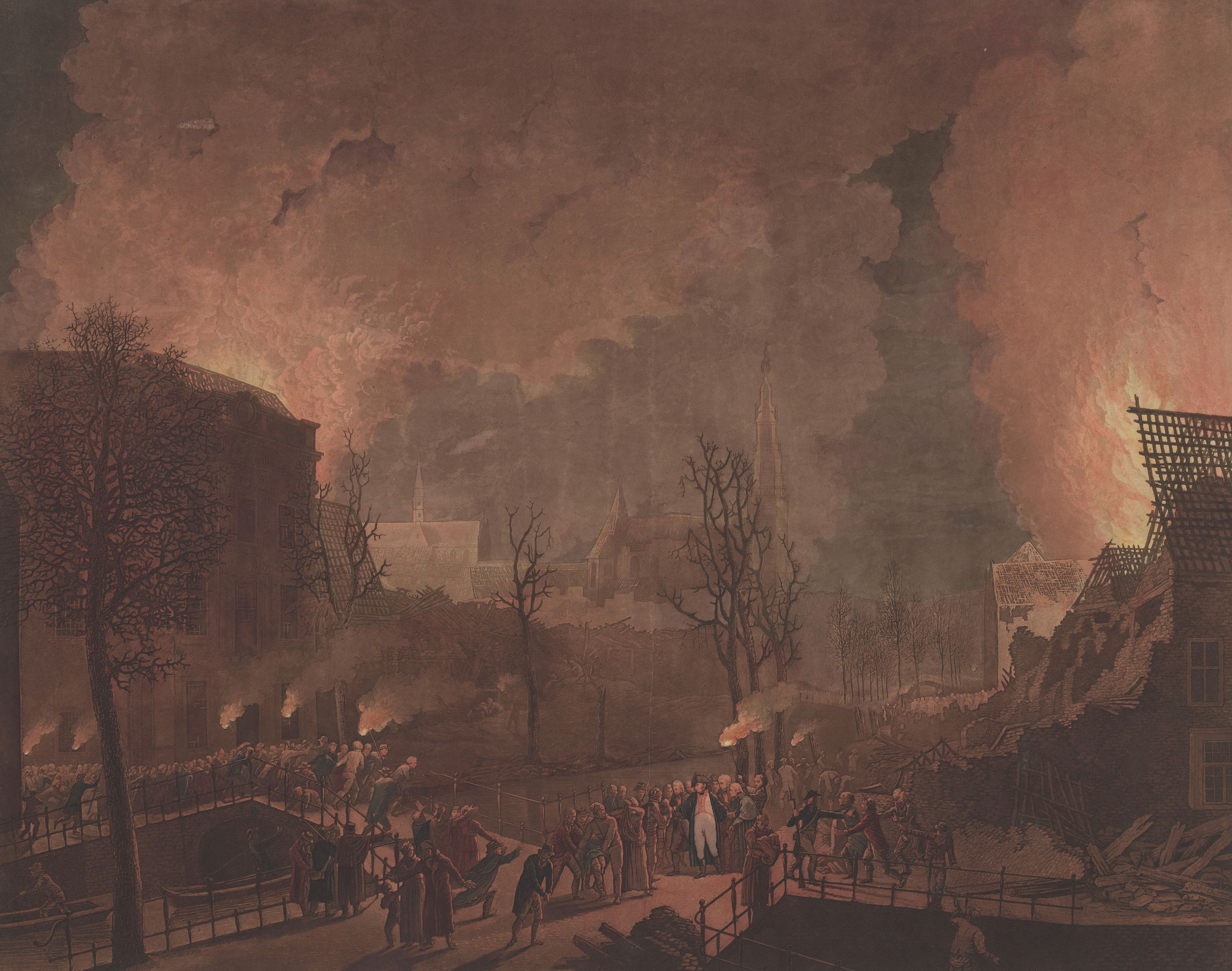
Louis Bonaparte visiting Leiden after the gunpowder disaster

Napoleon had intended for Louis to be little more than a French prefect of Holland. However, Louis had his own mind, and tried to be as independent of his older brother as possible. He made a sincere effort to learn the Dutch language, adopted the Dutch spelling of his name, Lodewijk, and declared himself Dutch rather than French. Louis's court and ministers had mostly been provided by Napoleon, but Louis insisted that they follow his example and declare themselves Dutch.

At the same time, Louis introduced the Napoleonic politics of centralisation and standardisation in the Netherlands. In the new centralised state of the Kingdom of Napoleon the king was able to appoint the mayors of the larger Dutch cities. In 1806 a new country-wide tax system was implemented that ended the widespread corruption. Louis also introduced the Civil Registry, Land Registry, and a Guarantee Act. In 1809 the king introduced a revised Penal Code and Civil Code which was based on the French criminal code, but which respected the Dutch customs and law. Louis Napoleon also replaced the provincial mints with a national one. During his reign he also promoted the equality of Jews, Catholics, and dissenters in the Netherlands. The centralism Louis Bonaparte promoted also led to the foundation or reorganisation of several cultural institutions. The Royal Netherlands Academy of Arts and Sciences and the Royal Museum (precursor of Rijksmuseum Amsterdam) were founded during his reign.

Aside from the politics of centralisation Louis Bonaparte showed himself as a king who was a concerned father of his country. In 1807 he was present at the site of the Leiden gunpowder disaster. To help the affected people in Leiden he started a national collection, donated 30.000 guilders and opened Huis ten Bosch as a hospital. He showed the same affection to his people at the floodings in Zeeland (1808) and the Betuwe (1809). Because of these actions, the Dutch started to see Louis as a good and a rightful king.

=== Downfall ===
Despite Louis Bonaparte's success in the Netherlands he got into conflict with the emperor. The conflicts between Napoleon and the king of Holland centered on three topics. The first was the tiering of the national debt, which Louis Bonaparte refused to do because the Dutch administration believed it would lead to damage to financial confidence and would be a blow to Dutch investors. Louis Bonaparte should also contribute to the French war effort by the introduction of conscription. The king refused to do this, but to help his brother at least, he ordered that the Dutch orphans enlist for the army. This was also not a popular measure. On 14 July 1809, a riot broke out in Rotterdam when the army came to pick up the orphan boys.

Louis Bonaparte also did not have a strict policy on maintaining the Continental System. Smuggling continued to exist, and only after great pressure from Paris did he take measures to combat this. However, he did not want to pursue a harsh coercive policy because this would be disastrous for Dutch maritime trade. Napoleon saw his brother as a slacker, and after the Walcheren Campaign (1809), he called Louis back to Paris. Napoleon incorporated the Dutch territories between the Meuse and the Scheldt. Louis Napoleon accepted the decisions of his older brother, but the treaty of March 1810 was only the beginning of the end. On 4 July, French troops captured Amsterdam. Louis Bonaparte abdicated on 1 July in favour of his son. By Imperial Decree the Kingdom of Holland was abolished and incorporated into the French Empire.

== Administrative division ==
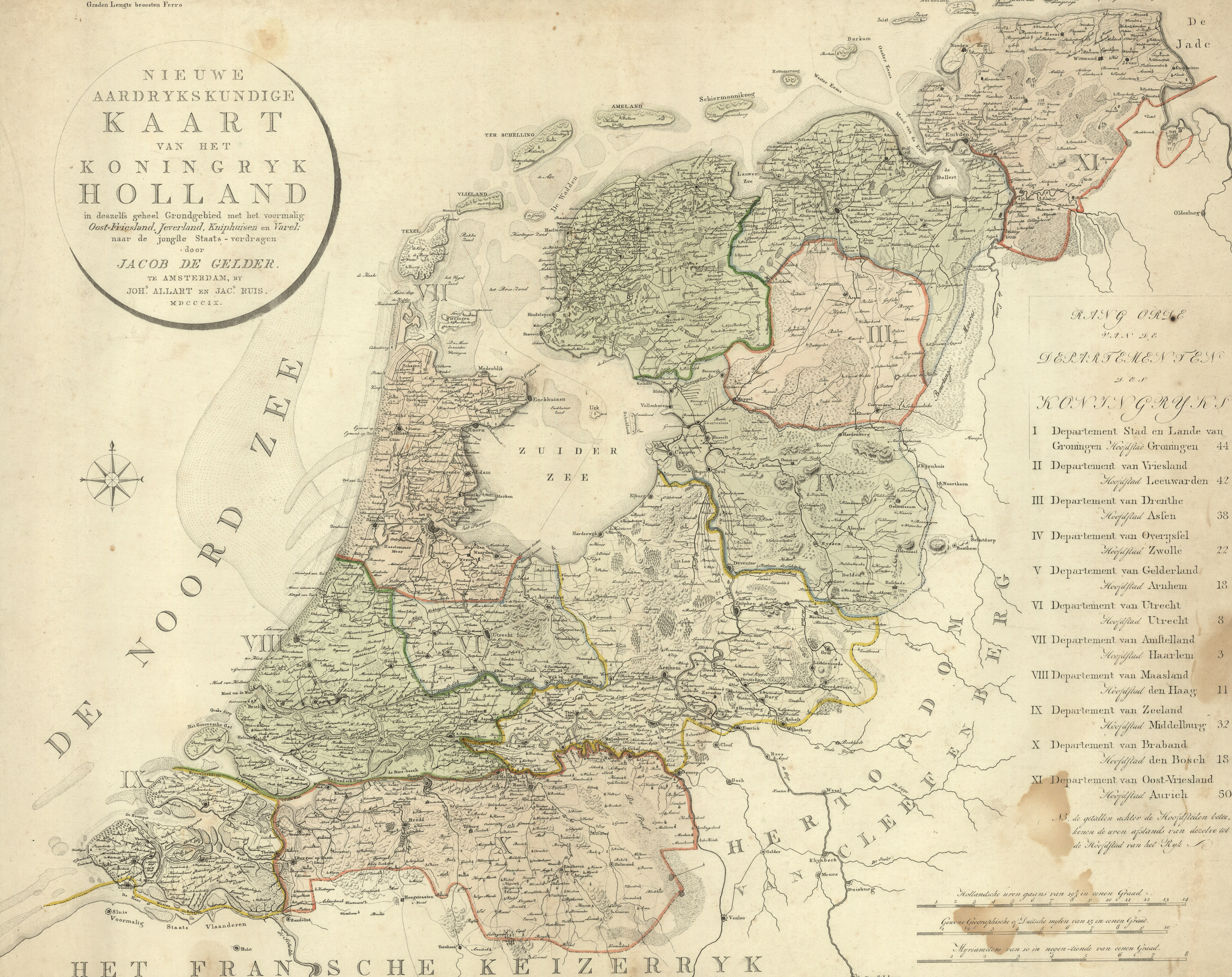
Map of the Kingdom of Holland with the division of the departments

In 1807 the Kingdom of Holland was divided into eleven departments. Each of them where divided into quarters, districts and cities. With this division the Dutch government followed the French centralization politics.

- Department Amstelland
- Department Brabant
- Department Drenthe
- Department East-Friesland
- Department Friesland
- Department Gelderland
- Department Groningen
- Department Maasland
- Department Overijssel
- Department Utrecht
- Department Zeeland

== Bibliography ==
- Aerts, R (2010). Land van Kleine gebaren: Een politieke geschiedenis van Nederland 1780-1990 (in Dutch). Nijmegen: SUN.
- Jourdan, A. (2006). "Staats- en natievorming in de tijd van Lodewijk Napoleon: Nederland als 'objet de désir'". De Negentiende Eeuw. 30 (3–4): 132–146.
- Kossmann, E.H. (1978). The Low Countries, 1780–1940.
- Meijer, F. (2020). "Nederlandse vorsten in tijden van ramspoed sinds Lodewijk Napoleon". Napoleons nalatenschap: Sporen in de Nederlandse samenleving.
- Prak, M. (1997). "Burghers into citizens: Urban and national citizenship in the Netherlands during the revolutionary era". Theory and Society. 26 (4): 403–420. doi:10.1023/A:1006886401627. S2CID 141711721.
- Schama, S. (1977). Patriots and Liberators: Revolution in the Netherlands, 1780–1813. London, UK: Collins.
- Van der Burg, M. (2010). "Transforming the Dutch Republic into the Kingdom of Holland: The Netherlands between republicanism and monarchy". European Review of History. 17 (2): 151–170. doi:10.1080/13507481003660811. S2CID 217530502.
- Van der Burg, M.; Lok, M. (2012). "The Netherlands under Napoleonic rule: A new regime or a revived order?". The Napoleonic Empire and the new European Political Culture.
