= Jaap Meijer (writer) =

Dutch historian and poet

- Born: Jakob Meijer; 18 November 1912; Winschoten, Netherlands
- Died: 9 July 1993 (aged 80); Heemstede, Netherlands
- Other names: Saul van Messel
- Occupations: Historian, poet
- Notable work: Isaac da Costa's weg naar het Christendom (1946)
- Relatives: Ischa Meijer (son)

Jaap Meijer (18 November 1912 – 9 July 1993) was a Dutch Jewish historian, and poet. He wrote his poetry under the pseudonym Saul van Messel.

== Biography ==
Meijer was born Jakob Meijer on 18 November 1912 in Winschoten, Netherlands, and was raised in the Orthodox Jewish tradition. At the age of 10, his father died, and it was decided to send him to the Dutch Israeli Seminary in Amsterdam to become a rabbi. During this period, he was involved in the zionist movement.

Meijer graduated from the seminary in 1938, but decided that he did not want to become a rabbi, and continued to study history at the University of Amsterdam. World War II had started and the Netherlands had been invaded, but Meijer had other things on his mind. On 20 June 1940, he married Liesje Voet, which caused controversy with his orthodox family, because her father was active as a trade unionist. Meijer was also working on his thesis about Isaac da Costa's conversion to Christianity. On 2 October 1941, he received his doctorate. From 1941 until 1943, he taught history at the Joods Lyceum. One of his students was Anne Frank. On 14 February 1943, his first child Ischa was born.

In June 1943, Meijer and his family were sent to Westerbork transit camp. On 15 February 1944, they were moved to Bergen-Belsen concentration camp. When British troops neared the camp, they were put on the so-called Lost Train, trains heading East with no clear destination. The train was captured by the Red Army in Tröbitz on 23 April 1945. Meijer and family managed to survive the war.

In 1946, his thesis was reprinted as Isaac da Costa's weg naar het Christendom As an author, he started to focus on the pre-war Jewish history in the Netherlands, and was known for his sharp criticisms. In 1951, Meijer taught history at the University of Amsterdam.

The Cold War worried Meijer, and in 1953, he accepted an offer to become rabbi in Paramaribo, Suriname. He did not stay long, and returned to the Netherlands in 1955.

In 1967, Meijer started to publish poetry in Kentering using the pseudonym Saul van Messel. Poetry started to become a means of escape from his Jewish history. From the 1970s onwards, he wrote many poems in Dutch, Gronings Low Saxon and Hebrew. In 1984, he was awarded the Literaire pries for his Gronings-language volume of poetry Vrouger of loater (1969).

Meijer died on 9 July 1993 in Heemstede, at the age of 80.

== Bibliography ==
- Cornelissen, Igor (2000). "Hora est Schrijvers en proefschriften". De Parelduiker (in Dutch).
