= Francine Christophe =

French writer and Holocaust survivor (1933–2025)

- Born: 18 August 1933; Paris, France
- Died: 4 November 2025 (aged 92)
- Occupation: Writer

Francine Christophe (French: [fʁɑ̃sin kʁistɔf]; 18 August 1933 – 4 November 2025) was a French writer and Holocaust survivor.

Deported to Bergen-Belsen in 1944, she often spoke at school events, giving her testimony of the events that transpired.

== Life and career ==
Born in Paris on 18 August 1933, Christophe was the daughter of French Jewish parents Robert Christophe and Marcelle Nordmann. Her father became a prisoner of war and was interned in Lübeck. On 26 July 1942, she and her mother were arrested while trying to cross the demarcation line in La Rochefoucauld. She was first sent to Angoulême before experiencing many other prison camps, such as Drancy, Pithiviers, and Beaune-la-Rolande. After the German forces took over Beaune-la-Rolande, Christophe and her mother were taken to Bergen-Belsen. They were evacuated just days before the liberation of the Theresienstadt Ghetto and wandered for 13 days until they were found and freed by the Soviet forces in Tröbitz on 23 April 1945.

After the war, Christophe and her mother were reunited with her father and two grandmothers. She moved to Hégenheim with her maternal grandmother and worked as an interior decorator. She also gave her testimony about her experiences, primarily lecturing at schools around Versailles. She married Jean-Jacques Lorch, with whom she had two children. Her friend, Victor Perahia, was also interned at Bergen-Belsen.

Christophe died on 4 November 2025, at the age of 92.

== Distinctions ==
- Commander of the Ordre national du Mérite
- Knight of the Legion of Honour (2001)
- Gold Medal of the City of Paris (2016)

== Publications ==
- Une petite fille privilégiée – Une enfant dans le monde des camps 1942-1945 (1996)
- Après les camps la vie (2002)
- Souvenirs en marge. Récits bien courts (2002)
- La photo déchirée et autres poèmes (2003)
- Guy s’en va. Deux chroniques parallèles (2005)
- Mes derniers récits (2009)
- Vous parlerez pour nous, Poèmes concentrationnaires (2010)
- Le Pêle-Mêle. Souvenirs, discours, articles, bla-bla (2014)
