= Food of Love (1997 film) =

- Directed by: Stephen Poliakoff
- Starring: Richard E. Grant
- Release date: 19 October 1997
- Running time: 105 mins.
- Country: United Kingdom
- Language: English

Food of Love is a 1997 film directed by Stephen Poliakoff. It stars Richard E. Grant and Nathalie Baye.

== Cast ==
- Richard E. Grant as Alex Salmon
- Nathalie Baye as Michele
- Joe McGann as Sam
- Sylvia Syms as Mrs. Harvey-Brown
- Juliet Aubrey as Madeline

== Reception ==
Writing in The Guardian, Xan Brooks concluded it was "a film afflicted by a barely disguised crisis of confidence".
