= Dr. Wijnaendts Francken-prijs =

Dutch literary award

The Dr. Wijnaendts Francken-prijs is a prize for essays and literary criticism awarded by the Dutch Maatschappij der Nederlandse Letterkunde. It was first awarded biennially, from 1934 to 1985, and after that every three years.

The award is named for Dutch writer and philosopher Cornelis Johannes Wijnaendts Francken.

== Laureates ==
- 2021 - Charlotte Van den Broeck, Waagstukken
- 2018 - Arjen Mulder, Wat is leven? Queeste van een bioloog
- 2015 - Joep Leerssen, Spiegelpaleis Europa
- 2012 - Thomas von der Dunk, Een Hollands heiligdom
- 2009 - Arnold Heumakers, De schaduw van de vooruitgang
- 2006 - Arianne Baggerman, Rudolf Dekker, Kind van de toekomst. De wondere wereld van Otto van Eck (1780-1798)
- 2003 - Frank Westerman, Ingenieurs van de ziel
- 2000 - Remieg Aerts, De letterheren. Liberale cultuur in de negentiende eeuw: het tijdschrift De Gids
- 1997 - Hugo Brems, De dichter is een koe
- 1994 - Willem Otterspeer, De wiekslag van hun geest
- 1991 - Jaap van Heerden, Wees blij dat het leven geen zin heeft
- 1988 - Frits van Oostrom, Het woord van eer
- 1985 - Carel Peeters, Houdbare illusies
- 1983 - Arie van Deursen, Het kopergeld van de Gouden Eeuw
- 1981 - Jeroen Brouwers, Kladboek
- 1979 - Hendrik Bonger, Leven en werk van Dirk Volckertsz Coornhert
- 1977 - Paul Rodenko, essays on De Vijftigers
- 1975 - Rob Nieuwenhuys, Oost-Indische spiegel
- 1973 - Karel van het Reve, Het geloof der kameraden
- 1971 - H.H. Zwager, Waarover spraken zij?
- 1969 - H.U. Jessurun d' Oliviera, Vondsten en bevindingen
- 1967 - Jan Emmens, Rembrandt en de regels van de kunst
- 1965 - C.F.P. Stutterheim, Conflicten en grenzen
- 1963 - Jan den Tex, Oldenbarnevelt, deel I en II
- 1961 - S. Dresden, De literaire getuige
- 1959 - no prize
- 1957 - Clement Bittremieux, De dichter Jan van Nijlen
- 1955 - H. van de Waal, Drie eeuwen vaderlandsche geschiedenisuitbeelding 1500-1800
- 1953 - H.A. Gomperts, Jagen om te leven
- 1951 - Johanna K. Oudendijk, Koningin Victoria
- 1949 - Abel Herzberg, Amor fati
- 1947 - Jacques Presser, Napoleon
- 1943 - A.M.W.J. Hammacher, Amsterdamsche impressionisten en hun kring
- 1941 - Simon Vestdijk, Albert Verwey en de Idee
- 1939 - M.D. Ozinga, Daniël Marot, de schepper van den Hollandschen Lodewijk XIV-stijl
- 1937 - Annie Romein-Verschoor, Vrouwenspiegel
- 1935 - Nicolas Japikse, Prins Willem III, stadhouder en koning
