= Bastille (film) =

- Directed by: Rudolf van den Berg
- Written by: Annemarie Vandeputte; Leon Dewinter (book)
- Produced by: Anne Lourdon; George Sluizer
- Music by: Van der Wilgen
- Distributed by: MSG Film
- Release date: 10 May 1984
- Running time: 91 minutes
- Country: Netherlands
- Language: Dutch

Bastille is a Dutch film by Rudolf van den Berg with Derek de Lint and Evelyne Dress in the leading role.

The script of the movie is based on the book La Place de la Bastille by Leon de Winter, alternatively known as De Burght.

Director Rudolph van den Berg received his second Gouden Kalf for best director. Bastille was a success in cinemas.

== Storyline ==
History teacher Paul de Wit, a forty-year-old man, is having a hard time. He is married, has a solid job, but has started to dislike everything in his life. He and his wife have grown apart over the years and he gets little to no satisfaction from his work as a teacher. For years he's been working on book on the flight of King Louis XVI during the French Revolution. When Louis and his wife reached Varennes, they were detained by revolutionaries and sent back to Paris. Once returned, the king was allowed to keep his position at first but was later deposed, the monarchy was abolished, and the king was tried and decapitated using the guillotine. Paul is fascinated by the idea of what would have happened if the attempted escape by Louis had been successful. Yet, his view on history in general is what makes him falter in his attempts. According to Paul, history does not consist of certainties but rather it consists of serendipitous elements. However, he does not seem to understand the necessity of some crucial events, for example, he is haunted by his own past. He is Jewish and born during the Second World War, his parents were gassed as well as his twin brother Philip, a fact which he learns at a later time. Because his brother is dead and he is still alive, he asks himself whether or not his existence is based on pure coincidence. During the summer holidays, he travels to Paris to collect more information to include in his book. In Paris he meets Pauline, a Jewish Frenchwoman, and begins an affair with her. At the Place de la Bastille, the starting point of the French Revolution, Pauline takes a picture of Paul. Once back home, Paul develops the film and discovers a man walking behind him in the background. That man turns out to be the spitting image of Paul. Paul sees only one explanation, that man is his supposedly dead twin brother. He decides to go back to Paris and starts searching for his brother. After searching for a long time in Paris, it dawns on him that he is in fact not looking for his brother Philip but he is in search of himself. Upon realising this, he returns to his family.

== Cast ==
- Derek de Lint - Paul de Wit / Nathan Blum
- Geert de Jong - Mieke de Wit
- Evelyne Dress - Nadine
- Loudi Nijhoff - midwife
- Ischa Meijer - Prof. Polak
- Dora Doll - Mrs. Friedlander
- Iboya Takacs - Hanna
- Kim Bagmeijer - Myriam
- Pierre Vial - Mr. Weinstock
- Tamar Baruch - Batseba
- Frank Schaafsma - Hein de Vries
- François Guizerix - Station bartender
- Anne Lordon - librarian
- George Sluizer- homeless person / first taxi driver
- René Bourdet - photographer

== Background ==
Bastille was Rudolph van den Berg's first major motion picture. With help from director George Sluizer as his producer, they made the film with a budget of only 330,000 euro. The theme of the movie, a Jewish man living unknowingly during the Second World War, struggling with his Jewish identity and the trauma of the Holocaust, was a theme close to van den Berg's own life. At the end of the seventies, the director was struggling with his Jewish identity. He was what is known as a second generation victim, children of victims of the German occupation wondering how the Holocaust could have happened. At first, van den Berg studied political science because he was interested in the connections between the oppressor and his victims with a few brave ones in between the two. In his films, he tried to shape whatever he found difficult to process.
