= Robert Emanuel Heilbut =

Dutch Jewish composer

Robert (Rob) Emanuel Heilbut (1919-1945) was a Dutch Jewish composer who wrote songs during the Holocaust about his experiences in Amsterdam, transition camp Westerbork and concentration camp Bergen-Belsen.

== Life in Amsterdam ==
Robert Emanuel Heilbut was a musician, composer and Holocaust victim.

Robert was born on February 2, 1919, in Amsterdam to Ernst Heilbut (1888–1943) and Flora Heilbut-Kalker (1888–1943). He grew up in a close-knit Jewish family with two brothers. A clerk by profession, Rob was also a passionate and gifted musician. He played the clarinet, accordion, and piano, and taught these instruments alongside music notation in his free time.

Rob's musical talent soon led him to the Joods Kleinkunst Ensemble (Jewish Cabaret Ensemble), which performed in the Hollandsche Schouwburg, then a vibrant cultural venue for Jewish artists. In the spring of 1942, Rob took part as a guest musician in the ensemble's successful show Fortissimo!, staged at the Jewish Theatre in Amsterdam. During this period, Rob met Annette "Netty" Dientje Frankfort (born in 1918), the daughter of the famous painter Eduart Salomon Frankfort. They fell in love and married in 1942. Their happiness, however, unfolded under the darkening shadow of Nazi occupation. By July 1942, the Hollandsche Schouwburg was repurposed by the Nazis as a deportation center. Thanks to Werner Levie, members of the Jewish Cabaret Ensemble were officially employed by the Joodse Raad Amsterdam (Jewish Council), offering temporary protection. Rob himself was listed as the leader of the Estafette department.

In his work, Rob wrote lively, humorous songs that reflected the surreal and often tragic realities of war-torn Amsterdam. These songs captured the spirit of a community resisting despair with creativity and wit.

In April 1943, Netty fell seriously ill and was hospitalized. Her dual status as a patient and student nurse allowed her to remain in the hospital even during deportation raids. On June 20, 1943, Rob and his parents were arrested and sent to Westerbork transit camp. Rob remained in Westerbork due to Netty's condition, but his parents were deported to Sobibor on June 29, where they were murdered.

== Transition Camp Westerbork ==
In Westerbork, Rob worked in food distribution as an Essenholer, and was also able to continue his music. He performed in the camp hospital with other artists, including the renowned singer and actress Esther Zwaap-Philipse (born in 1913 in Rotterdam, murdered in Auschwitz in 1944). In August 1943, Rob began documenting his music. He transcribed earlier songs from Amsterdam and composed new ones inspired by life in the camp. These were written down in two notebooks—one containing musical notation (muziekboekje), the other his lyrics.

== Bergen-Belsen ==
In February 15, 1944, Rob was deported to Bergen-Belsen. He was placed in the Sternlager (Star Camp), reserved for Jewish prisoners holding foreign passports. There, he continued performing, notably with fellow musician Robbert Marcel Gosschalk, who, like Rob, would later perish on the "Lost Train."

Between February and October 1944, Rob wrote several new songs in Bergen-Belsen, which were added to his notebooks. His music became a source of emotional relief and hope for fellow prisoners. Survivors later recalled the comfort his songs provided during their darkest moments.

== The Lost Train ==
In April 1945, with Allied forces approaching, Rob was placed aboard the third of three trains evacuating Bergen-Belsen. This train, which never reached its destination of Theresienstadt, became known as the "Lost Train." For over a week, the train wandered aimlessly through collapsing Nazi Germany, under appalling conditions.

On April 23, 1945, the Red Army liberated the train near the village of Tröbitz. One day earlier, Rob had died of typhus, just shy of freedom. He was buried in a nearby forest. He was 26 years old.

== The musical legacy of Robert Heilbut ==
Rob's music notebooks survived the war. Netty, who survived in hiding, received them and later donated them to Yad Vashem. Today, they serve as a testimony to Jewish life, artistic resistance, and personal resilience during the Holocaust. Rob Heilbut's songs—joyful, poignant, defiant—continue to echo, offering insight, remembrance, and hope.

The first most comprehensive and complete research on Rob Heilbut was conducted by Duo NIHZ. Duo NIHZ – consisting of Bobby Rootveld and Sanna van Elst – completed an extensive project on March 16, 2025, after no less than ten years of research into the Dutch singer-composer Rob Heilbut. Their publication (Songs from the Holocaust by Rob Heilbut, his life story and sheet music) includes a book and accompanying CDs that carefully document Heilbut's artistic legacy.

The duo used letters, postcards, sheet music, and diary fragments from multiple archives — not only from Rob but also from his wife Netty (Annette Heilbut Frankfort). They also interviewed Holocaust survivors who had been in the same places as Rob Heilbut.Some of Heilbut's songs contain hidden survival tips — clues on how prisoners could better cope with the hardships of the camps.The book presents Rob as a "forgotten singer-songwriter" and places his work within the context of the Jewish Cabaret Ensemble and performances in the Hollandsche Schouwburg. The presentation took place in the Synagogue Enschede.

== Sources ==
- website Rob Heilbut
- video about the research
- Documents of Robert Emanuel Heilbut and his wife in the archive of the Joods Museum Amsterdam (Jewish Museum Amsterdam, most in Dutch)
- Documents about Robert Emanuel Heilbut in the archive of Westerbork
- Documents about Robert Emanuel Heilbut in the Ghetto Fighters' House
