= The Lost Lover =

- Directed by: Roberto Faenza
- Written by: Abraham B. Jehoshua; Sandro Petraglia; Roberto Faenza
- Starring: Ciarán Hinds; Juliet Aubrey
- Cinematography: José Luis Alcaine
- Music by: Paolo Buonvino
- Release date: 1999
- Running time: 97 minutes
- Countries: Italy; United Kingdom
- Language: English

The Lost Lover (Italian: L'amante perduto), is a 1999 Italian-British drama film directed by Roberto Faenza.

== Cast ==
- Ciarán Hinds as Adam
- Juliet Aubrey as Asya
- Stuart Bunce as Gabriel
- Clara Bryant as Dafi
- Erick Vazquez as Na'im
- Juliet Aubrey as Asya
- Cyrus Elias as Herlich
- Edoardo Moscone as Yigal
- Phyllida Law as The grandmother
- Ahamed Abu Salun as Naim's father
- Abed Zuabi as Hamid
- Ariel Horowitz as Rabbi
