= Fred Mulders =

Dutch musical artist and journalist

- Also known as: Guido Daunic
- Born: Freerk Johannes Mulders; September 18, 1911; Amsterdam
- Died: May 5, 1960 (aged 48) Mexico City
- Genres: Flamenco guitar and Classical guitar
- Occupations: guitarist, journalist

Freerk Johannes Mulders (Amsterdam, 1911 – Mexico City, 1960), also known as Freek, Frederic or Fred Mulders, was a Dutch guitar player and journalist. He was also a brigadist in the Spanish Civil War, member of the Dutch resistance, and victim of McCarthyism. Mulders introduced the flamenco guitar in the Netherlands, performed in the San Francisco Bay Area, and recorded Mexican indigenous music in the 1950s.

== Biography ==
Freerk Johannes was the second of three children of the schoolteachers Johannes Mulders and Anna Wilkens. He studied mechanical engineering in the Middelbare Technische School, a vocational school. Mulders entered military service in 1932 and became a corporal. After his military service he took up guitar playing.

=== Brigadist in the Spanish Civil War ===
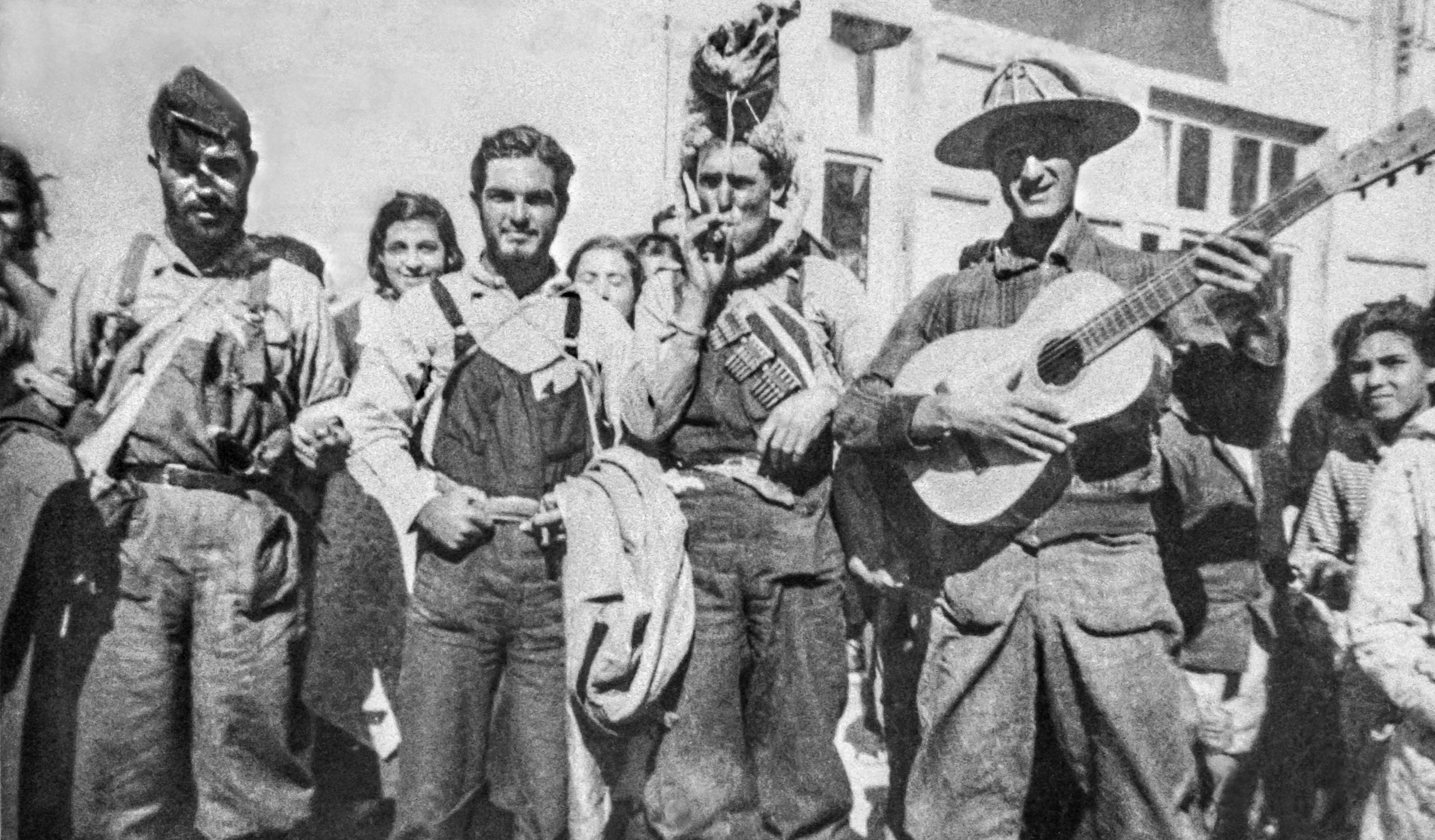
Republican milicia arrive at Alginet, October 13th, 1936, with Fred Mulders holding the guitar

Inspired by the music of Andres Segovia, Mulders visited Barcelona to study guitar. Back in Amsterdam, he gave guitar lessons in a house he shared with his fiancée Milly van Duivenbode and his friends Maarten and Jan Hendrik, sons of Jan van Gilse. In 1936 Mulders and Maarten travelled to Italy as correspondent of the Dutch communist newspaper De Tribune. His friend Maarten was arrested and Mulders fled to Barcelona. There he took guitar lessons with Miguel Llobet while working for De Tribune. The Spanish Coup of July 1936 prompted Mulders to join a Republican militia to help build barricades around the Montjuic Castle. Because of his knowledge of mechanical engineering and his military background, Mulders joined the International Group of the Durruti Column that marched to Zaragoza. In november of 1936 Mulders returned to Barcelona and got involved in the air defence forces.

In 1937 Mulders was requested by general Julius Deutsch to travel to nationalist-controlled territory. After his return to Barcelona, he was arrested and reported to the Tribunal Especial de Espionaje y Alta Traición, a Republican tribunal for treason. Mulders was imprisoned in the prison-boat Argentina. In March 1938 he was evicted from Barcelona.

=== Member of the Dutch resistance during World War II ===
Mulders moved in with his fiancée van Duivenbode in Amsterdam. The couple married in June 1938. Mulders played the guitar in theater plays and cabaret and founded the guitar association Constantijn Huygens. He was guitar teacher in the Volksmuziekschool (People´s music school).

Mulders joined the resistance group CS-6 (Sabotage Committee number 6) together with other Dutch veterans of the Spanish Civil War such as Jef Last, whose book Elfstedentocht (Eleven cities tour) mentions Mulders participation in the skating event in 1940.

Mulders was arrested in December 1942 and imprisoned in Kamp Amersfoort. In february 1943 he was transferred to Kamp Vught where he joined the artists section and was able to obtain a guitar. His fellow-prisoner Marius Flothuis later dedicated his composition Folia to Mulders.

In March 1944 Mulders was liberated. He returned to Amsterdam and worked for the resistance journal De Vonk. He divorced van Duivenbode in June 1944.

After World War II Mulders returned to his guitar career. He provided the music for the Dutch version of the theater play Guardate del Agua Mansa by Pedro Calderón de la Barca, a play that was performed over 50 times in different theatres in the Netherlands around 1946, earning him the fame of having introduced classical Spanish guitar to the Dutch audience. Nevertheless, he could not get used to post-war Netherlands. In 1947 Mulders decided to travel to Chicago where his older brother Jan lived.

=== Guitarist in the United States ===
Mulders became a member of the Chicago Classic Guitar Society but soon took the opportunity to accompany a flamenco dancer to New York. He became a member of the New York Society of the Classic Guitar and gave a presentation together with Andrés Segovia. Soon he moved to California where he joined the Bay Area Classic Guitar Society and found a job in restaurant Goya in San Francisco as cook and guitarist.

Mulders, with the stage name Guido Daunic, was part of the Baroque Players, a band founded by Paul Ashford. He married for the second time and had a child.

After his second divorce and in the era of McCarthyism, his residence permit was not renewed because of his communist past. Mulders married again and moved to Mexico with his third wife in 1953.

=== Journalist and indigenous music recorder in Mexico ===
In Mexico, Mulders eventually went back to his profession of journalist. He published several articles in the Groene Amsterdammer. He travelled through Mexico to record indigenous music. In 1959 Mulders presented some of these recordings on English and Dutch radio. His plans to publish these recordings were cut short by a sudden illness. Mulders died in Mexico-City on May 5th, 1960.
