= Igor Cornelissen =

Dutch journalist (1935–2021)

- Born: 3 May 1935; Zwolle, Netherlands
- Died: 13 March 2021 (aged 85); Zwolle, Netherlands
- Occupations: Writer, journalist

Igor Cornelissen (3 May 1935 – 13 March 2021) was a Dutch journalist and author.

Cornelissen was born in Zwolle. He was journalist at Het Vrije Volk (1956–1958), editor at Vrij Nederland (1962–1996) and between 1990 and 2000, he wrote the Voetnoot column for Het Parool.

Cornelissen has written many novels and books. His literary work mainly focused on World War II, and Communism. He wrote biographies of Jaap Meijer and Paul de Groot. Cornelissen was a member of the Fourth International. Until 1971, he was a trotskyist.

Cornelissen died in Zwolle on 13 March 2021 from a heart attack.

== Literature ==
- Rudie Kagie: 'Levensbericht Igor Cornelissen'. In: Jaarboek van de Maatschappij der Nederlandse Letterkunde te Leiden, 2024-2025, p. 101-113
