= Connie Palmen =

Dutch writer (born 1955)

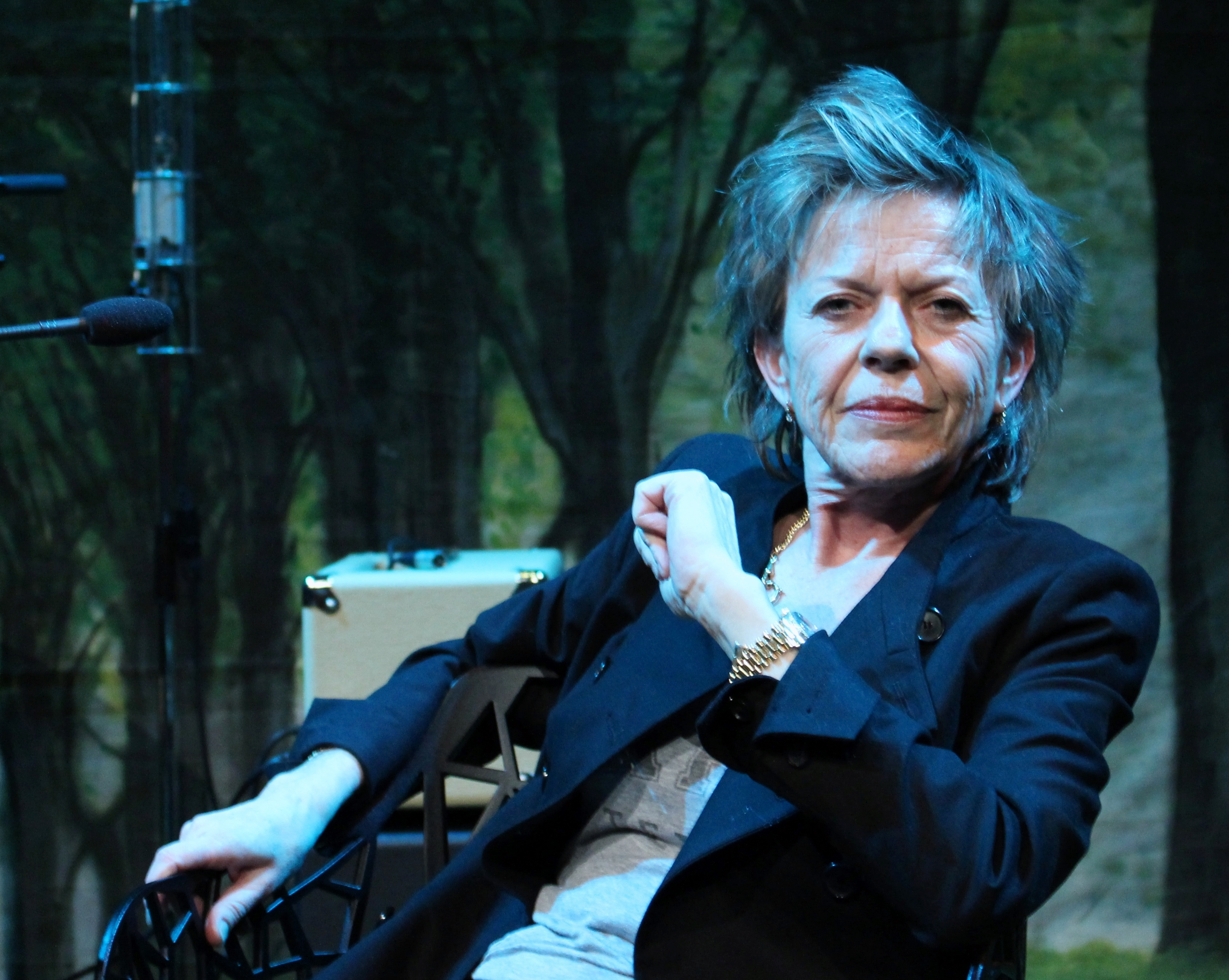
- Palmen in 2014
- Born: Aldegonda Petronella Huberta Maria Palmen; 25 November 1955 (age 70); Sint Odiliënberg, Netherlands
- Spouse(s): Hans van Mierlo (2009-2010) (w.)
- Writing career
- Period: 1990-present

Aldegonda Petronella Huberta Maria "Connie" Palmen (born 25 November 1955) is a Dutch author.

Palmen debuted with the novel De wetten (1990), published in the United States as The Laws (1993), translated by Richard Huijing. The Laws was shortlisted for the 1996 International Dublin Literary Award.

Her second novel was De vriendschap (1995), published in the United States as The Friendship (2000), translated by Ina Rilke. It is the story of the lifelong friendship of two girls with completely different characters.

Palmen had a relationship with Ischa Meijer in the years preceding his death in 1995. From 1999 on she lived with D66 politician Hans van Mierlo until his death on 11 March 2010. The couple married on 11 November 2009

== Awards and honors ==
- 1995 AKO Literatuurprijs for De vriendschap
- 2016 Libris Prize for Jij zegt het
- 2026 Constantijn Huygens-prijs for her entire body of work

== Published works ==
- 1991 De Wetten (1993 The Laws)
- 1995 De Vriendschap (2000 The Friendship)
- 1998 I.M.
- 1999 De Erfenis ("Boekenweekgeschenk")
- 2002 Geheel de uwe
- 2007 Lucifer
- 2015 Jij zegt het
- 2026 Johnnie Walker
