= Jonah Who Lived in the Whale =

1993 film

- Film poster
- Directed by: Roberto Faenza
- Written by: Roberto Faenza; Jona Oberski ("Jona Obersky"); Hugh Fleetwood
- Starring: Jean-Hugues Anglade
- Cinematography: János Kende
- Edited by: Nino Baragli
- Music by: Ennio Morricone
- Release date: 1 April 1993
- Running time: 100 minutes
- Countries: Italy; France
- Language: English
- Box office: $30,000

Jonah Who Lived in the Whale (Italian: Jona che visse nella balena; in the United States released as Look to the Sky) is a 1993 Italian-French drama film directed by Roberto Faenza, based on the autobiographical novel by the writer Jona Oberski entitled Childhood (Dutch: Kinderjaren), focused on the drama of the Holocaust. It was entered into the 18th Moscow International Film Festival, where it won the Prix of Ecumenical Jury.

== Plot ==
Jonah is a three-year-old Dutch boy who lives in Amsterdam during the Second World War. After the occupation of the city by the Germans, he was deported to the concentration camp together with his entire family in 1942. Here Jonah will spend the remainder of the war in a shack with his mother, but separated from his father.

The child suffers cold, hunger, fear, deprivation, and even harassment by the other boys. He seldom encounters compassion: only the cook, who later dies, and the doctor of the clinic show him kindness. The fate of Jonah's parents is tragic: his father dies of exhaustion from being overworked and his mother succumbs in a hospital after the end of the war, having been driven insane by her ordeal and her husband's death.

However, Jonah survives and, back to Amsterdam, is adopted in his father's employer home where, after an initial period of suffering, he regains the will to live.

Many years after the war Jonah has become a nuclear physicist, gets married, and has three sons.

== Cast ==
- Jean-Hugues Anglade as The Father
- Juliet Aubrey as The Mother
- Jenner Del Vecchio as Jonah (older)
- Luke Petterson as Jonah (young)
- Francesca De Sapio
- Simona Faceva
- Djoko Rosic
- Alexandrina Bojlova

== See also ==
- List of Italian films of 1993
