= Remieg Aerts =

Dutch historian and Professor of History (born 1957)

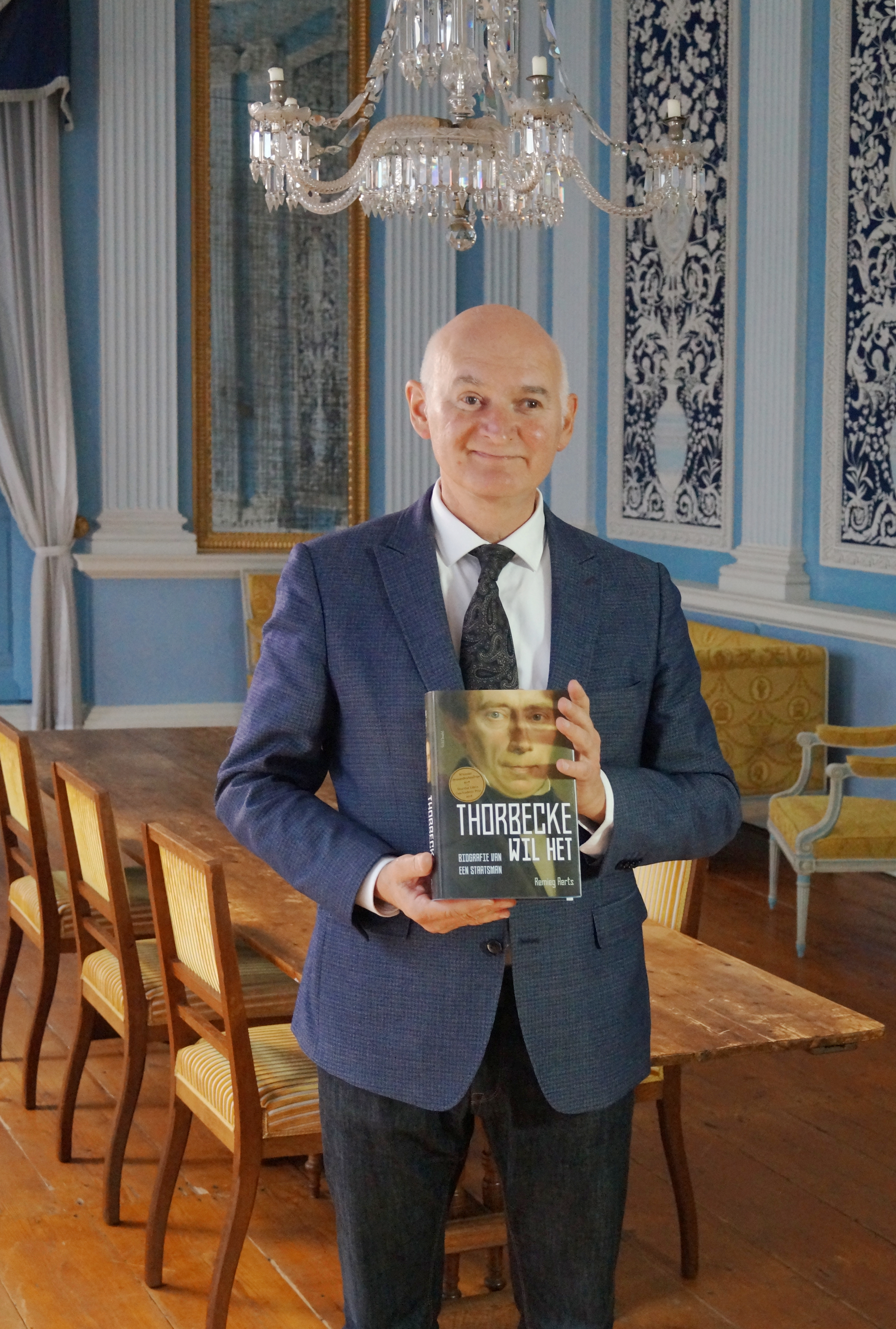
Remieg Aerts in 2020 with his biography about Thorbecke

Remieg A. M. Aerts (born 17 September 1957) is a Dutch historian and Professor of Dutch History at University of Amsterdam.

== Biography ==
Aerts was born in Amsterdam. After secondary school he briefly considered studying Chinese, but instead of that he started studying history. After he finished his PhD, for which he took ten years, in 1997 at the University of Groningen Aerts became assistant professor in Philosophy of History at that same university. Later he became professor of Political History at Radboud University Nijmegen. In 2000 he won the Dr. Wijnaendts Francken-prijs for his work De letterheren. Liberale cultuur in de negentiende eeuw: het tijdschrift De Gids. In 2003 Aerts was one of the starters of the Omstreden Democratie (Controversial Democracy) project of the Netherlands Organisation for Scientific Research, which involved dozens of scientists doing research on Dutch democracy. He cooperated in this project along with other Dutch professors of Dutch history as James Kennedy and Henk te Velde. Aerts was also involved in the founding of the Research School of Political History, which functions as an educational institution for PhD-students.

He was elected member of the Royal Netherlands Academy of Arts and Sciences in 2011. In 2017 Aerts transferred from the Radboud University to the University of Amsterdam where he became professor of Dutch History. Three years later he received the "Nederlandse biografieprijs" (Dutch Biography Price) for his book Thorbecke wil het about the 19th century Dutch liberal statesman Johan Rudolph Thorbecke. On 28 June 2022 Aerts held his farewell speech at the University of Amsterdam and his speech was titled Lalla Rookh, of de waan van de wetenschap (Lalla Rookh, or the delusion of science).

== Selected bibliography ==
- Thorbecke wil het: Biografie van een staatsman. (4e ed.) Amsterdam: Prometheus, 2018.
- Alles is cultuur: Vensters op moderne cultuurgeschiedenis. (ed. with Klaas van Berkel and Babette Hellemans) Hilversum: Verloren, 2018.
- Omstreden democratie: over de problemen van een succesverhaal. (with Peter de Goede) Amsterdam: Boom, 2013.
- Land van kleine gebaren: Een politieke geschiedenis van Nederland 1780-1990. (with Herman de Liagre Böhl, Piet de Rooy and Henk te Velde) Amsterdam: Boom, 2013.
- De letterheren. Liberale cultuur in de negentiende eeuw: het tijdschrift De Gids Amsterdam: Meulenhoff, 1997.
