= Martin van Amerongen =

Dutch journalist, publisher, columnist and author (1941 – 2002)

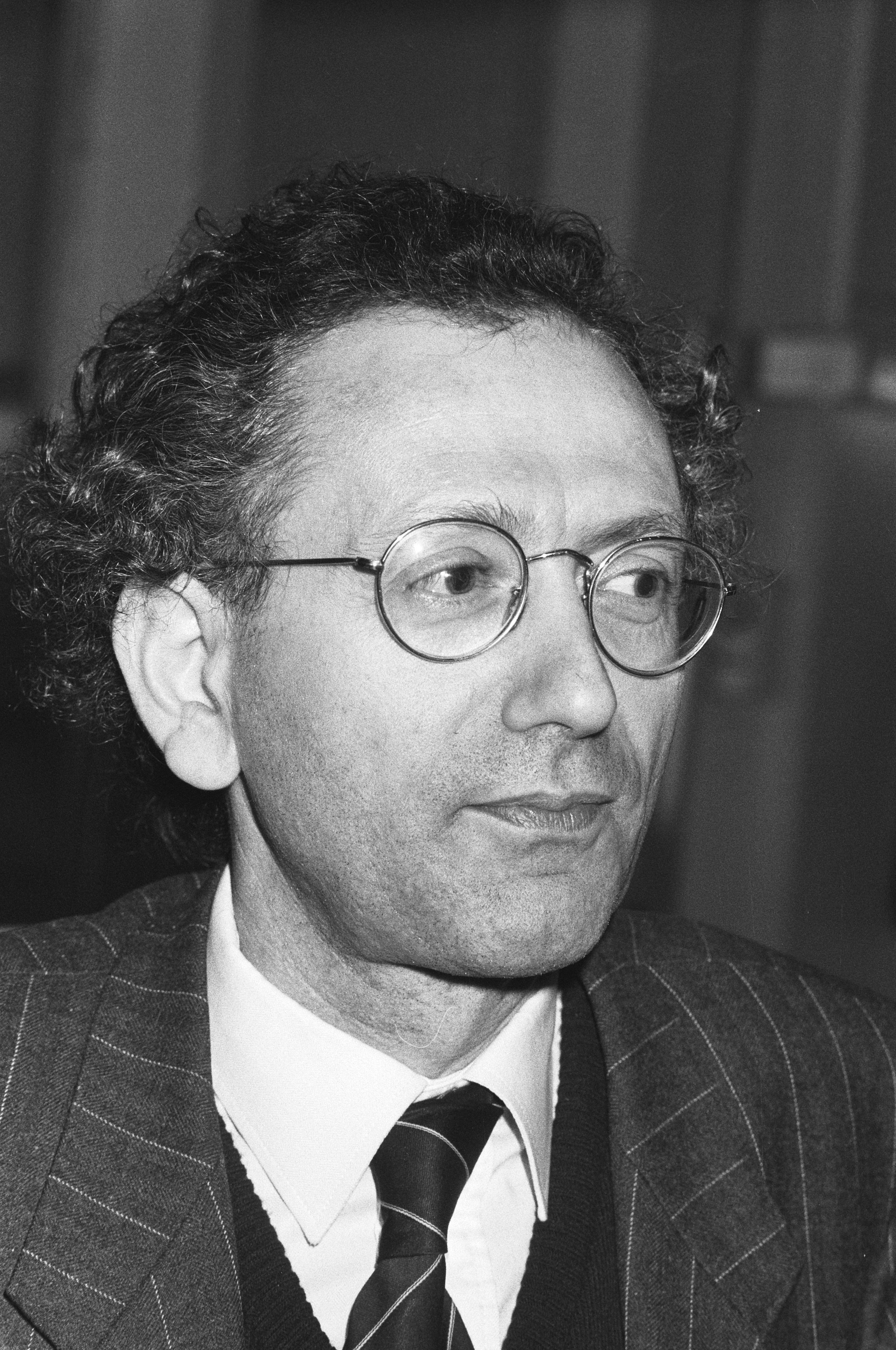
- Martin van Amerongen in 1986
- Born: Martin Florian van Amerongen; 8 October 1941; Amsterdam, Netherlands
- Died: 11 May 2002 (aged 60); Amsterdam, Netherlands
- Occupations: Journalist; publisher; columnist; author
- Years active: 1962–2002
- Employer: De Groene Amsterdammer

Martin Florian van Amerongen (8 October 1941 – 11 May 2002) was a Dutch journalist, publisher, columnist and author. From 1985 to his death, except for a hiatus in 1997–1999, he served as editor-in-chief of the news weekly De Groene Amsterdammer.
