= Ischa Meijer =

Dutch journalist and author (1943–1995)

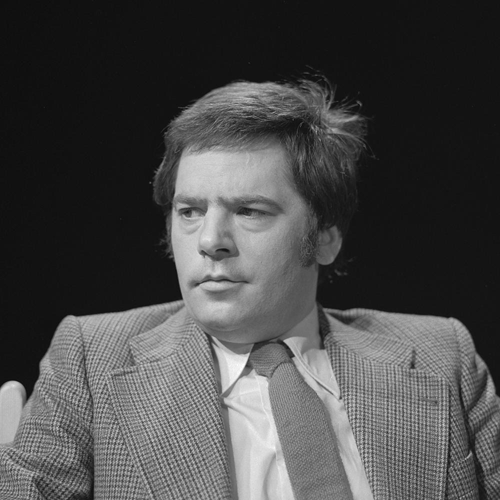
- Ischa Meijer in 1976
- Born: Israël Chaim Meijer; 14 February 1943; Amsterdam, Netherlands
- Died: 14 February 1995 (aged 52); Amsterdam, Netherlands
- Occupations: Journalist; Television presenter; Radio presenter; Critic; Interviewer; Author; Screenwriter; Columnist; Actor
- Years active: 1970–1995
- Partner(s): Jenny Arean (1980–1982); Connie Palmen (1990–1995)
- Children: 2
- Website: Official site

Israël Chaim "Ischa" Meijer (14 February 1943 – 14 February 1995) was a Dutch journalist, television presenter, radio presenter, critic and author.

== Youth ==
Ischa Meijer was born as the oldest child of historian Jaap Meijer and Liesbeth Voet. He was deported to the Bergen-Belsen concentration camp as a baby along with his parents. They managed to survive, and returned to Amsterdam after the war, where Ischa's siblings Mirjam and Job were born. The family emigrated to Paramaribo in Surinam in the 1950s, fearing a communist take-over. After a few years the Meijer family returned to Amsterdam after having difficulties adjusting to the environment. Ischa grew up in a family traumatised by the experiences of the Holocaust which led to emotional as well as alleged physical abuse by his parents. He was thrown out of the house at age eighteen. His parents also ended contact with Ischa's siblings.

== Career ==
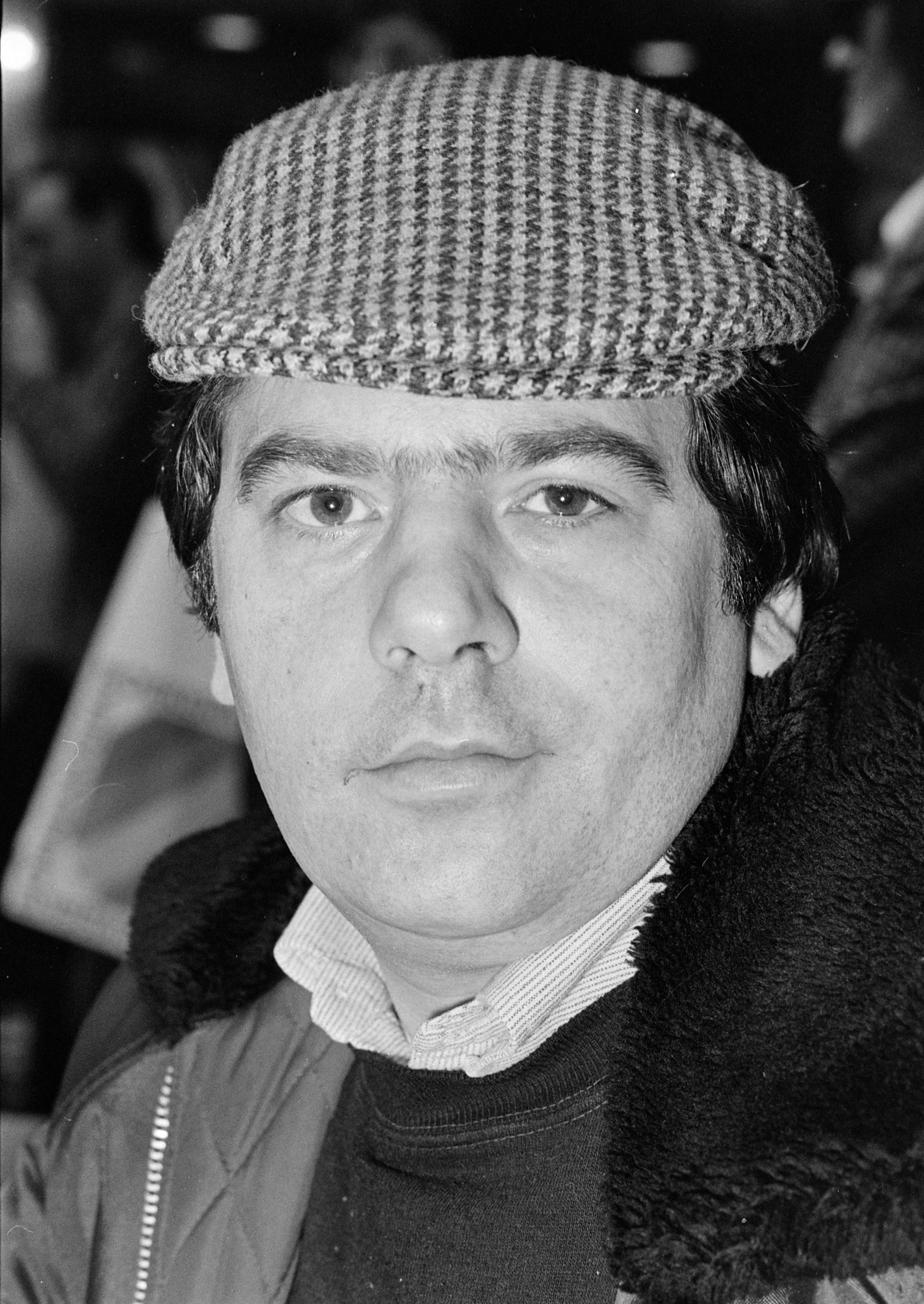
Ischa Meijer, 1979.

Ischa started working as a journalist for De Nieuwe Linie; later he also worked for the news magazines Haagse Post, Nieuwe Revu, and Vrij Nederland. He became well known for his broad-ranging in-depth interviews. In 1984 he published a controversial interview with politician (and at that time mayor of Rotterdam) Bram Peper, which caused national commotion. The interview eventually was one of the reasons for Peper to divorce his wife, and start a period of heavy alcoholism.

== Radio and television ==
For a considerable time Meijer was the host of the radio show Een Uur Ischa (One Hour Ischa), later transformed into Een Dik Uur Ischa (lit. An extended Hour Ischa). He also hosted a late-night show on the television network RTL 5.

== Relationships ==
Meijer had several relationships throughout his life, and also visited prostitutes on a regular basis, giving him the inspiration to write the book Hoeren (Hookers) (1980). In the late 1980s Meijer had a relationship with comedian and actress Jenny Arean. In the years preceding his death he had a solid relationship with writer Connie Palmen, who wrote a book about her relationship with Ischa, called I.M. (1998).

== Death and legacy ==
Ischa continued throughout his life searching for the love his parents never gave to him. When Ischa's mother became seriously ill in 1993, Ischa and his siblings were not allowed to say goodbye. Several weeks after her death Ischa's father Jaap died as well.

On 14 February 1995, on his 52nd birthday, Ischa Meijer died of a heart attack while on his way to his coffeehouse to celebrate his birthday. He was survived by his son Jeroen and his daughter Jessica. His death was widely publicized in Dutch news media.

That same year he was given posthumous recognition for his work by receiving the Zilveren Reissmicrofoon, an important Dutch radio award. Besides the book I.M. another book was launched concerning the life of Meijer, this time by his sister Mirjam who wrote the book Mijn broer Ischa (My brother Ischa) (1997). Meijer also played a background role in another book by Connie Palmen, Geheel de Uwe (Entirely Yours).

A documentary on Meijer's life was broadcast on Dutch television on 14 February 2005 called Ik hou van mij (I love myself), made by documentary maker Kees de Groot van Embden.

== Filmography ==
Year	Title	Role	Notes
1969	Ibiza, zon en zonde		
1982	De boezemvriend	Commissaris	
1984	Bastille	Prof. Polak	
1984	De wil voor de werkelijkheid		
1985	De leeuw van Vlaanderen	De Nogaret	
