= Rients Dijkstra =

Dutch lawyer and journalist

Rients Dijkstra (1902–1970) was a Dutch lawyer and journalist. He operated a law office and had business dealings with the Tuschinski family; he was also a journalist for the daily newspaper De Telegraaf and part owner of De Groene Amsterdammer. He also played an important role in the country's cultural life, befriending and supporting writers and artists.
