= De Groene Amsterdammer =

Periodical literature

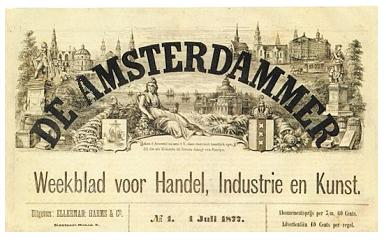
- 1877 headline
- Categories: Trade, industry, arts, literature, investigative journalism, longreads, interviews.
- Frequency: Weekly
- Format: A4
- Publisher: De Groene Amsterdammer
- Total circulation (2025): 40.000+
- Founded: 1877
- First issue: 1877
- Country: Netherlands
- Based in: Amsterdam
- Language: Dutch
- Website: www.groene.nl
- ISSN: 0017-4483 (print); 1384-5896 (web)
- OCLC: 73680282

De Groene Amsterdammer is an independent Dutch weekly news magazine published in Amsterdam since 1877.

== History and profile ==
De Groene Amsterdammer was founded in 1877, Martin van Amerongen was the editor-in-chief from 1984 to 1997 and then again from 1999 to 2002.

De Groene Amsterdammer making it one of the oldest Dutch news magazines still in existence. The magazine started under the name De Amsterdammer, meaning "someone (or something) from Amsterdam". In its early days green ink was used, later causing the word groene (green) to be added to its name when a second newspaper in Amsterdam was published under the same name De Amsterdammer. The name De Groene Amsterdammer became official in 1925. As its title implies the weekly is based in Amsterdam. During the German occupation between 1940 and 1945, the magazine ceased to exist.

Over the course of time the magazine manifested itself in Dutch media with a wide range of subjects being published about, varying from philosophy, politics and literature to the liberal arts. De Groene Amsterdammer, unlike its name suggests, shows a keen interest in international subjects, with a network of freelance correspondents in various countries over the world.

The weekly magazine is generally considered to be intellectually left-wing and progressive. As of 2022, it has a circulation of 27,904.

== Notable editors ==
- Anil Ramdas
- Anna Blaman
- Dirk Bezemer
- Fred Mulders
- Frederik van Eeden
- Geert Mak
- Henk Hofland
- Loe de Jong
- Martin van Amerongen
- Simon Carmiggelt
- Theodor Holman

== Previous editors-in-chief ==
Until the Second World War		After the Second World War	
Johannes de Koo	1877–1894	Rients Dijkstra	1945–1970
no editor-in-chief	1894–1897	no editor-in-chief	1970–1985
Johannes de Koo	1897–1907	Martin van Amerongen	1985–1997
Henri Pierre Leonard Wiessing	1907–1914	Gerard van Westerloo	1997–1998
Joost Adriaan van Hamel	1914–1920	Martin van Amerongen	1999–2002
Gerhard Wilhelm Kernkamp	1920–1929	Hubert Smeets	2003–2007
A.C. Josephus Jitta	1929–1936	Xandra Schutte	2008–
no editor-in-chief	1936–1940		
zeitweise Einstellung	1940–1945		
