= Juliet Aubrey =

British actress (born 1966)

- Born: Juliet Emma Aubrey; 17 December 1966 (age 59); Fleet, Hampshire, England
- Education: Central School of Speech and Drama
- Occupation: Actress
- Years active: 1991–present
- Spouse: Steve Ritchie (m. 2001)
- Children: 2

Juliet Emma Aubrey (born 17 December 1966) is a British actress; She won the 1995 BAFTA TV Award for Best Actress for playing Dorothea in the BBC serial Middlemarch (1994). She is also known for her role as Helen Cutter in the ITV series Primeval (2007–2011). Other credits include Jonah Who Lived in the Whale (1993), Go Now (1995), Welcome to Sarajevo (1997), Food of Love (1997), Still Crazy (1998), Iris (2001), The Constant Gardener (2005), Criminal Justice (2008), Five Daughters (2010), Hunted (2012), The White Queen (2012), The Infiltrator (2016), and Snatch (2017-2018).

== Early life ==
The youngest of three siblings, Aubrey was born and brought up in Fleet, Hampshire. Her first experience of acting was at her school, playing a doctor in George and the Dragon on stage at St Nicholas' School, Hampshire at the age of six. She then attended the Roman Catholic private school Farnborough Hill in Farnborough, Hampshire, and still attends reunions with her old schoolfriends whenever possible (2016).

She furthered her education from 1984, at King's College London, where she studied Classics and Archaeology. During her time as a student, she spent a year studying in Italy, touring with a travelling theatre company. Passionate about acting, she applied successfully to train for three years at the Central School of Speech and Drama.

== Career ==
In 1991, she toured with the Oxford Stage Company, playing Miranda in The Tempest. In 1993, Italian director Roberto Faenza gave Aubrey her first film role playing opposite Jean-Hugues Anglade in Jonah Who Lived in the Whale (1993), an Italian film set during the Nazi Holocaust. In 1994, Antony Page and Louis Marks then cast Aubrey as Dorothea in the BBC adaptation of Middlemarch, opposite Rufus Sewell, for which she won a BAFTA award for Best Actress, and the Broadcasting Press Guild for Best Actress.

In theatre, she has appeared in Trevor Nunn's Summerfolk (1999), and Katie Mitchell's Ivanov (2002), at the National Theatre, Tim Crouch's An Oak Tree for Karl James at the Soho Theatre, and Chris White's Three Sisters, Twelfth Night and The Collection.

In 1995, Michael Winterbottom cast her opposite Robert Carlyle and James Nesbitt in the television film Go Now.

Aubrey's subsequent films include Winterbottom's Welcome to Sarajevo (1997), Stephen Poliakoff's Food of Love, for which she won Best Actress at La Baule European Film Festival Faenza's Lost Lover, Giacomo Campiotti's Time to Love, Richard Eyre's Iris, Fernando Meirelles's Constant Gardener, (alongside Ralph Fiennes and Rachel Weisz) and Brian Gibson's Still Crazy, nominated for two Golden Globes. Other features include Mat Cod's Super Eruption. Television work includes Primeval (2007), The White Queen (2012), Criminal Justice (2008), Vera, Hunted (2012), and Five Daughters. Her recent feature films are Scott Hicks's Fallen; Mitch Davis's Stuck; Fabio Guaglione's Mine; and worked with Bryan Cranston in Brad Furman's Infiltrator.

Aubrey played Lily Hill, working alongside Rupert Grint and Phoebe Dynevor in the television series Snatch. BBC Radio 4 The Archers (2024) as Eve Chilcott.

== Personal life ==
In 2001, Aubrey married production designer Steve Ritchie, whom she had met several years earlier while filming an ITV adaptation of Catherine Cookson's The Moth in Newcastle upon Tyne. They have two daughters.

She is a cousin of David Howell Evans (a.k.a. "The Edge"), guitarist of the Irish band U2.

She is a keen runner, intends to run the Great North Run and a marathon (2016).

== Filmography ==
Key
†	Denotes projects that have not yet been released

=== Film ===
Year	Title	Role	Notes	Ref.
1992	Shining Through	Lorraine	Uncredited	
1993	Jonah Who Lived in the Whale	The Mother		
1994	Jacob	Leah	Television film	
1995	Go Now	Karen Walker	Television film	
1996	Death of a Salesman	Miss Forsythe	Television film	
1997	Welcome to Sarajevo	Helen Henderson		
1997	For My Baby	Lillian Glass		
1997	Food of Love	Madeline		
1998	Still Crazy	Karen Knowles		
1999	The Lost Lover	Asya		
2001	Iris	Young Janet Stone		
2002	Bertie and Elizabeth	Elizabeth	Television film	
2002	Ella and the Mothers	Madeline	Television film	
2005	The Constant Gardener	Gloria Woodrow		
2006	A Good Murder	Kay	Television film	
2007	A Class Apart	Olivia Troth	Television film	
2008	Caught in the Act	Marlene		
2010	F	Helen Anderson		
2011	Super Eruption	Kate	Television film	
2015	Christmas Eve	Marta		
2016	The Infiltrator	Evelyn Mazur		
2016	Mine	Rosa		
2016	Fallen	Doreen Price		
2020	LX 2048	Dr. Maple		
2022	A Midsummer Night's Dream	Titania		
2024	Frankenstein Legacy	Millicent Browning		
2026	Truly Naked	Mrs Bennett		
TBA	Vindicta †	Adela Lieben	Completed	

=== Television ===
Year	Title	Role	Notes	Ref.
1992	The Big Battalions	Susan	Miniseries; 5 episodes	
1993	The Case-Book of Sherlock Holmes	Dolores	Episode: "The Last Vampyre"	
1994	Middlemarch	Dorothea Brooke	Miniseries; 6 episodes	
1994	Performance	Isabella	Episode: "Measure for Measure"	
1997	Supply & Demand	DCI Alex Chomsky	Episode: "Pilot"	
1998	The Unknown Soldier	Sophia Carey	Miniseries; 3 episodes	
1999	Extremely Dangerous	Annie	Miniseries; 4 episodes	
2000	The Canterbury Tales	Theodora	Episode: "The Journey Back"	
2001	Shockers	Esther Powell	Episode: "Cyclops"	
2003	The Mayor of Casterbridge	Susan Henchard	Miniseries; 2 episodes	
2005	Dalziel and Pascoe	Dr Eleanor Brown	Episode: "The Dig"	
2006	Midsomer Murders	Ginny Lamington	Episode: "Country Matters"	
2007	Judge John Deed	Fran Pavely	Episode: "War Crimes"	
2007–2011	Primeval	Helen Cutter	Series regular; 25 episodes	
2008	City of Vice	Jane Fawkland	Episode: "Episode One"	
2008	Criminal Justice	Mary Coulter	Series regular; 5 episodes	
2009	Law & Order: UK	Emma Sandbrook	Episode: "Vice"	
2010	Five Daughters	Marie Alderton	Miniseries; 3 episodes	
2010	Lewis	Selina Mortmaigne	Episode: "The Dead of Winter"	
2011	Outcasts	Josie Hunter	Recurring role; 2 episodes	
2011	Vera	Felicity Calvert	Episode: "Hidden Depths"	
2012	Lilyhammer	Karen Sokolowsky	Episode: "Reality Check"	
2012	Silent Witness	Miriam Wade	Episode: "Redhill"	
2012	Hunted	Orla Fante	Miniseries; 2 episodes	
2013	The White Queen	Lady Anne Beauchamp, Countess of Warwick	Miniseries; 7 episodes	
2014	The Village	Joy Dangerfield	Recurring role; 2 episodes	
2017–2018	Snatch	Lily Hill	Series regular; 20 episodes	
2020	Van der Valk	Sister Joan Pauwels	Episode: "Only in Amsterdam"	
2021	On The Edge	Yvonne	Episode: "Cradled"	
2021–2024	Professor T.	DCI Christina Brand	Series regular; 15 episodes	
2022	Whitstable Pearl	Freya Doody	Episode: "The Offer"	
2024	Unsinkable	Joy Hawkins	Miniseries; 8 episodes	
2024	All Creatures Great and Small	Miss Grantley	Episode: "Pair Bond"	
