= Tröbitz =

- Municipality
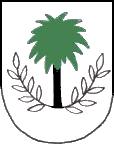
- Coat of arms

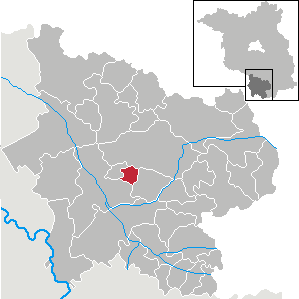
- Location of Tröbitz within Elbe-Elster district
- Interactive map of Tröbitz
- Location within Germany Location within Brandenburg
- Coordinates: 51°36′00″N 13°25′59″E
- Country: Germany
- State: Brandenburg
- District: Elbe-Elster
- Municipal assoc.: Elsterland

Government
  - Mayor (2024–29): Holger Gantke (CDU)

Area
  - Total: 10.56 km^{2} (4.08 sq mi)
- Elevation: 114 m (374 ft)

Population (2025-12-31)
  - Total: 610
  - Density: 58/km^{2} (150/sq mi)
- Time zone: UTC+01:00 (CET)
  - Summer (DST): UTC+02:00 (CEST)
- Postal codes: 03253
- Dialling codes: 035326
- Vehicle registration: EE, FI, LIB

Tröbitz is a municipality in the Elbe-Elster district, in Lower Lusatia, Brandenburg, Germany.

== History ==
From 1815 to 1947, Tröbitz was part of the Prussian Province of Brandenburg. From 1952 to 1990, it was part of the Bezirk Cottbus of East Germany.

== Demography ==
Development of Population since 1875 within the Current Boundaries (Blue Line: Population; Dotted Line: Comparison to Population Development of Brandenburg state; Grey Background: Time of Nazi rule; Red Background: Time of Communist rule)

Tröbitz population development
within the current boundaries (2013)

Year	Pop.	±% p.a.
1875	274	—
1890	318	+1.00%
1910	988	+5.83%
1925	985	−0.02%
1933	918	−0.88%
1939	882	−0.66%
1946	1,278	+5.44%
1950	1,301	+0.45%
1964	1,120	−1.06%
1971	1,137	+0.22%
1981	1,190	+0.46%
1985	1,197	+0.15%
1989	1,194	−0.06%
1990	1,189	−0.42%
1991	1,149	−3.36%
1992	1,122	−2.35%
1993	1,107	−1.34%
1994	1,053	−4.88%
1995	1,050	−0.28%
1996	1,026	−2.29%

Year	Pop.	±% p.a.
1997	1,025	−0.10%
1998	974	−4.98%
1999	955	−1.95%
2000	910	−4.71%
2001	876	−3.74%
2002	860	−1.83%
2003	845	−1.74%
2004	837	−0.95%
2005	802	−4.18%
2006	788	−1.75%
2007	786	−0.25%
2008	773	−1.65%
2009	777	+0.52%
2010	771	−0.77%
2011	744	−3.50%
2012	745	+0.13%
2013	734	−1.48%
2014	738	+0.54%
2015	712	−3.52%
2016	715	+0.42%
