= Elbe-Elster I =

State electoral district of Germany

36: Elbe-Elster I
- Electoral district for the Landtag of Brandenburg
- Elbe-Elster I in 2024
- District: Elbe-Elster
- Electorate: 43,996 (2024)
- Major settlements: Falkenberg/Elster, Finsterwalde, Herzberg, Schönewalde, Sonnewalde, and Uebigau-Wahrenbrück

Current electoral district
- Created: 1994
- Party: AfD
- Member: Peter Drenske

Elbe-Elster I is an electoral constituency (German: Wahlkreis) represented in the Landtag of Brandenburg. It elects one member via first-past-the-post voting. Under the constituency numbering system, it is designated as constituency 36. It is located in within the district of Elbe-Elster.

== Geography ==
The constituency includes the towns of Falkenberg/Elster, Finsterwalde, Herzberg, Schönewalde, Sonnewalde, and Uebigau-Wahrenbrück, as well as the districts of Kleine Elster and Schlieben.

There were 43,996 eligible voters in 2024.

== Members ==
Election	Member	Party	%
2004	Carolin Steinmetzer-Mann	PDS	32.5
2009	Carolin Steinmetzer-Mann	Left	31.5
2014	Rainer Genilke	CDU	31.4
2019	Peter Drenske	AfD	25.5
2024	Peter Drenske	AfD	36.3

== Election results ==
=== 2024 election ===
State election (2024): Elbe-Elster I
Notes:	Blue background denotes the winner of the electorate vote. Pink background denotes a candidate elected from their party list. Yellow background denotes an electorate win by a list member, or other incumbent. A ✓ or ✗ denotes status of any incumbent, win or lose respectively.						
Party	Candidate	Votes	%	±%	Party votes	%	±%
AfD	✓ Peter Drenske	11,474	36.4	▲10.9	10,383	32.7	▲6.2
SPD	Dominic Hake	8,755	27.7	▲4.3	9,205	29.0	▲2.9
BSW					4,697	14.8	
CDU	Rainer Genilke	7,007	22.2	▼2.1	4,069	12.8	▼6.7
BVB/FW	Zierenberg	3,406	10.8	▲2.2	1,007	3.2	▼2.7
Left					694	2.2	▼6.7
APT					562	1.8	▼0.7
Greens	Große Holtrup	554	1.8	▼3.4	470	1.5	▼3.7
DLW					191	0.6	
FDP	Hänig	364	1.2	▼2.9	188	0.6	▼3.5
Plus					168	0.5	▼0.6
Values					61	0.2	
Third Way					45	0.1	
DKP					26	0.1	
Informal votes		515			309		
Total valid votes		31,560			31,766		
Turnout		32,075	72.9	▲11.3			
AfD hold	Majority	2,719	8.7	▲7.5			

=== 2019 election ===
State election (2019): Elbe-Elster I
Notes:	Blue background denotes the winner of the electorate vote. Pink background denotes a candidate elected from their party list. Yellow background denotes an electorate win by a list member, or other incumbent. A ✓ or ✗ denotes status of any incumbent, win or lose respectively.						
Party	Candidate	Votes	%	±%	Party votes	%	±%
AfD	Peter Drenske	7,133	25.5		7,431	26.5	▲16.0
CDU	✗ Rainer Genilke	6,791	24.3	▼7.1	5,464	19.5	▼7.5
SPD	Barbara Hackenschmidt	6,560	23.4	▼4.1	7,315	26.1	▼6.7
Left	Aaron Birnbaum	2,512	9.0	▼11.5	2,479	8.8	▼7.1
BVB/FW	Axel Eckert	2,407	8.6	▼8.4	1,658	5.9	▲0.4
Greens	Friedericke Ullrich	1,450	5.2	▲1.6	1,454	5.2	▲2.3
FDP	Reiko Mahler	1,143	4.1		1,154	4.1	▲2.8
Tierschutzpartei					700	2.5	
Pirates					196	0.7	▼0.5
ÖDP					119	0.4	
V-Partei3					71	0.3	
Informal votes		406			361		
Total valid votes		27,996			28,041		
Turnout		28,402	61.6	▲11.9			
AfD gain from CDU	Majority	342	1.2				

=== 2014 election ===
State election (2014): Elbe-Elster I
Notes:	Blue background denotes the winner of the electorate vote. Pink background denotes a candidate elected from their party list. Yellow background denotes an electorate win by a list member, or other incumbent. A ✓ or ✗ denotes status of any incumbent, win or lose respectively.						
Party	Candidate	Votes	%	±%	Party votes	%	±%
CDU	Rainer Genilke	7,390	31.4	▲6.6	6,409	27.0	▲4.0
SPD	Barbara Hackenschmidt	6,459	27.5	▲1.6	7,794	32.8	▲0.4
Left	✗ Carolin Steinmetzer-Mann	4,828	20.5	▼11.0	3,780	15.9	▼10.8
AfD					2,504	10.5	
BVB/FW	Iris Schülzke	3,995	17.0	▲14.9	1,300	5.5	▲3.9
Greens	Gerhard Strauß	837	3.6	▼0.2	699	2.9	▼0.2
NPD					559	2.4	▼0.1
FDP					297	1.3	▼5.7
Pirates					290	1.2	
REP					69	0.3	Steady
DKP					44	0.2	▲0.1
Informal votes		708			472		
Total valid votes		23,509			23,745		
Turnout		24,217	49.7	▼18.7			
CDU gain from Left	Majority	931	3.9				

=== 2009 election ===
State election (2009): Prignitz I
Notes:	Blue background denotes the winner of the electorate vote. Pink background denotes a candidate elected from their party list. Yellow background denotes an electorate win by a list member, or other incumbent. A ✓ or ✗ denotes status of any incumbent, win or lose respectively.						
Party	Candidate	Votes	%	±%	Party votes	%	±%
Left	✓ Carolin Steinmetzer-Mann	10,713	31.5	▼1.0	9,159	26.7	▲1.0
SPD	Barbara Hackenschmidt	8,830	25.9	▼0.4	11,118	32.4	▲0.2
CDU	Rainer Genilke	8,436	24.8	▼3.3	7,903	23.0	▲0.5
FDP	Johannes Wohmann	2,988	8.8	▲3.2	2,400	7.0	▲3.1
Greens	Klaus Peschel	1,284	3.8	▲0.6	1,065	3.1	▲1.3
NPD	Michael Grabow	1,082	3.2		872	2.5	
DVU					671	2.0	▼5.8
BVB/FW	Ronald Kulok	717	2.1		540	1.6	
50Plus					203	0.6	▼0.5
RRP					155	0.5	
Die-Volksinitiative					145	0.4	
REP					91	0.3	
DKP					33	0.1	Steady
Informal votes		1,357			1,052		
Total valid votes		34,050			34,355		
Turnout		35,407	68.4	▲9.8			
Left hold	Majority	1,883	5.6	▲1.2			

=== 2004 election ===
State election (2004): Elbe-Elster I
Notes:	Blue background denotes the winner of the electorate vote. Pink background denotes a candidate elected from their party list. Yellow background denotes an electorate win by a list member, or other incumbent. A ✓ or ✗ denotes status of any incumbent, win or lose respectively.						
Party	Candidate	Votes	%	±%	Party votes	%	±%
PDS	Carolin Steinmetzer	10,089	32.53		8,035	25.66	
CDU	Wilfried Schrey	8,710	28.09		7,047	22.50	
SPD	Barbara Hackenschmidt	8,154	26.29		10,082	32.20	
DVU					2,428	7.75	
FDP	Michael Walter	1,725	5.56		1,211	3.87	
Familie					804	2.57	
AfW (Free Voters)	Michael Buchweitz	1,335	4.30		263	0.84	
Greens	Klaus Peschel	998	3.22		558	1.78	
50Plus					350	1.12	
Gray Panthers					159	0.51	
Yes Brandenburg					124	0.40	
BRB					105	0.34	
AUB-Brandenburg					87	0.28	
DKP					31	0.10	
Schill					30	0.10	
Informal votes		1,003			700		
Total valid votes		31,011			31,314		
Turnout		32,014	58.64				
PDS win new seat	Majority	1,379	4.44				

== See also ==
- Politics of Brandenburg
- Landtag of Brandenburg
