= Echtermeyer =

Echtermeyer is a surname. Notable people with the surname include:

- Curt Echtermeyer (1896–1971), Chilean-German painter
- Ernst Theodor Echtermeyer (1805–1844), German writer and philosopher
