= Oberhavel III =

State electoral district of Germany

9: Oberhavel III
- Electoral district for the Landtag of Brandenburg
- Oberhavel III in 2024
- District: Oberhavel
- Electorate: 48,358 (2024)
- Major settlements: Oranienburg and Liebenwalde

Current electoral district
- Created: 1994
- Party: AfD
- Member: Tim Zimmermann

Oberhavel III is an electoral constituency (German: Wahlkreis) represented in the Landtag of Brandenburg. It elects one member via first-past-the-post voting. Under the constituency numbering system, it is designated as constituency 9. It is located in the Oberhavel district.

== Geography ==
The constituency includes the towns of Oranienburg and Liebenwalde, as well as the municipality of Leegebruch.

There were 48,358 eligible voters in 2024.

== Members ==
Election	Member	Party	%
2004	Gerrit Große	PDS	38.9
2009	Gerrit Große	Left	33.7
2014	Björn Lüttmann	SPD	27.0
2019	Björn Lüttmann	SPD	24.9
2024	Tim Zimmermann	AfD	33.4

== Election results ==
=== 2024 election ===
State election (2024): Oberhavel III
Notes:	Blue background denotes the winner of the electorate vote. Pink background denotes a candidate elected from their party list. Yellow background denotes an electorate win by a list member, or other incumbent. A ✓ or ✗ denotes status of any incumbent, win or lose respectively.						
Party	Candidate	Votes	%	±%	Party votes	%	±%
AfD	Tim Zimmermann	11,302	33.4	▲10.6	10,346	30.4	▲6.1
SPD	✗ Björn Lüttmann	11,275	33.3	▲8.4	10,324	30.4	▲4.5
BSW					4,374	12.9	
CDU	Nicole Walter-Mundt	6,212	18.3	▼2.5	4,177	12.3	▼3.5
BVB/FW	Ließke	1,593	4.7	▼1.5	775	2.3	▼2.5
Left	Boldt-Händel	1,401	4.1	▼6.5	946	2.8	▼7.8
Plus	Günther	746	2.2	▲1.1	430	1.3	▼0.2
Greens	Weiß	736	2.2	▼6.0	1,149	3.4	▼6.5
Tierschutzpartei					897	2.6	▼0.6
FDP	Hani	383	1.1	▼2.9	309	0.9	▼2.9
DLW					124	0.4	
Third Way	Meyer	214	0.6		73	0.2	
Values					73	0.2	
DKP					16	0.0	
Informal votes		427			276		
Total valid votes		33,862			34,013		
Turnout		34,289	70.9	▲12.3			
AfD gain from SPD	Majority	27	0.1				

=== 2019 election ===
State election (2019): Oberhavel III
Notes:	Blue background denotes the winner of the electorate vote. Pink background denotes a candidate elected from their party list. Yellow background denotes an electorate win by a list member, or other incumbent. A ✓ or ✗ denotes status of any incumbent, win or lose respectively.						
Party	Candidate	Votes	%	±%	Party votes	%	±%
SPD	✓ Björn Lüttmann	6,732	24.9	▼2.1	6,984	25.8	▼5.7
AfD	Andreas Galau	6,142	22.7	▲10.5	6,573	24.3	▲9.8
CDU	Nicole Walter-Mundt	5,628	20.8	▼1.4	4,264	15.8	▼4.9
Left	Elke Bär	2,885	10.7	▼16.2	2,861	10.6	▼10.2
Greens	Heiner Klemp	2,211	8.2	▲3.9	2,661	9.8	▲4.7
BVB/FW	Heinz Ließke	1,675	6.2	▲3.0	1,295	4.8	▲3.0
FDP	Daniel Langhoff	1,087	4.0	▲2.5	1,023	3.8	▲2.5
Die PARTEI	Maximilian Horn	352	1.3				
Tierschutzpartei					885	3.3	
Pirates	Ria Nicola Schulz	295	1.1		268	1.0	▼0.2
ÖDP					141	0.5	
V-Partei3					69	0.3	
Informal votes		399			382		
Total valid votes		27,007			27,024		
Turnout		27,406	58.6	▲14.4			
SPD hold	Majority	590	2.2	▲2.1			

=== 2014 election ===
State election (2014): Oberhavel III
Notes:	Blue background denotes the winner of the electorate vote. Pink background denotes a candidate elected from their party list. Yellow background denotes an electorate win by a list member, or other incumbent. A ✓ or ✗ denotes status of any incumbent, win or lose respectively.						
Party	Candidate	Votes	%	±%	Party votes	%	±%
SPD	Björn Lüttmann	5,330	27.0	▼1.5	6,208	31.5	▼3.5
Left	✗ Gerrit Große	5,307	26.9	▼6.8	4,098	20.8	▼6.6
CDU	Werner Mundt	4,381	22.2	▲0.9	4,077	20.7	▲2.6
AfD	Christof Hertkorn	2,406	12.2		2,858	14.5	
Greens	Maria Heider	840	4.3	▼0.8	1,015	5.1	▲0.1
BVB/FW	Ulrich Hebestreit	623	3.2	▲1.1	363	1.8	Steady
NPD	Björn Beuchel	546	2.8	▼0.8	542	2.7	▼0.4
FDP	Sebastian Herzog	289	1.5	▼4.2	257	1.3	▼5.5
Pirates					241	1.2	
DKP					39	0.2	▲0.1
REP					33	0.2	▼0.2
Informal votes		311			302		
Total valid votes		19,722			19,731		
Turnout		20,033	44.2	▼20.9			
SPD gain from Left	Majority	23	0.1				

=== 2009 election ===
State election (2009): Oberhavel III
Notes:	Blue background denotes the winner of the electorate vote. Pink background denotes a candidate elected from their party list. Yellow background denotes an electorate win by a list member, or other incumbent. A ✓ or ✗ denotes status of any incumbent, win or lose respectively.						
Party	Candidate	Votes	%	±%	Party votes	%	±%
Left	✓ Gerrit Große	9,427	33.7	▼5.2	7,711	27.4	▼2.5
SPD	Tino Kunert	7,963	28.5	▲3.0	9,859	35.0	▲3.3
CDU	Michael Ney	5,969	21.3	▲0.1	5,094	18.1	▲0.4
FDP	Ralf Stephan Krenke	1,607	5.7	▲1.2	1,926	6.8	▲3.6
Greens	Heiner Klemp	1,424	5.1	▲1.7	1,415	5.0	▲1.9
NPD	Detlef Appel	996	3.6		874	3.1	
BVB/FW	Axel Heidkamp	596	2.1		493	1.8	
DVU					323	1.1	▼5.7
RRP					163	0.6	
50Plus					141	0.5	▼0.9
REP					102	0.4	
DKP					32	0.1	Steady
Die-Volksinitiative					31	0.1	
Informal votes		951			769		
Total valid votes		27,982			28,164		
Turnout		28,933	65.1	▲10.6			
Left hold	Majority	1,464	5.2	▼8.2			

=== 2004 election ===
State election (2004): Oberhavel III
Notes:	Blue background denotes the winner of the electorate vote. Pink background denotes a candidate elected from their party list. Yellow background denotes an electorate win by a list member, or other incumbent. A ✓ or ✗ denotes status of any incumbent, win or lose respectively.						
Party	Candidate	Votes	%	±%	Party votes	%	±%
PDS	Gerrit Große	8,858	38.93		6,858	29.91	
SPD	Dirk Blettermann	5,806	25.51		7,263	31.68	
CDU	Annemarie Reichenberger	4,830	21.23		4,054	17.68	
DVU					1,562	6.81	
FDP	Monika Gentz	1,032	4.54		740	3.23	
Greens	Cornelia Berndt	777	3.41		702	3.06	
Familie					566	2.47	
50Plus					325	1.42	
Gray Panthers					268	1.17	
Schill	Wolfgang Klinkers	738	3.24		191	0.83	
AfW (Free Voters)	Peter Spangenberg	715	3.14		139	0.61	
BRB					89	0.39	
Yes Brandenburg					75	0.33	
AUB-Brandenburg					63	0.27	
DKP					34	0.15	
Informal votes		687			514		
Total valid votes		22,756			22,929		
Turnout		23,443	54.51				
PDS win new seat	Majority	3,052	13.42				

== See also ==
- Politics of Brandenburg
- Landtag of Brandenburg
