= Carl Friedrich Echtermeier =

German sculptor

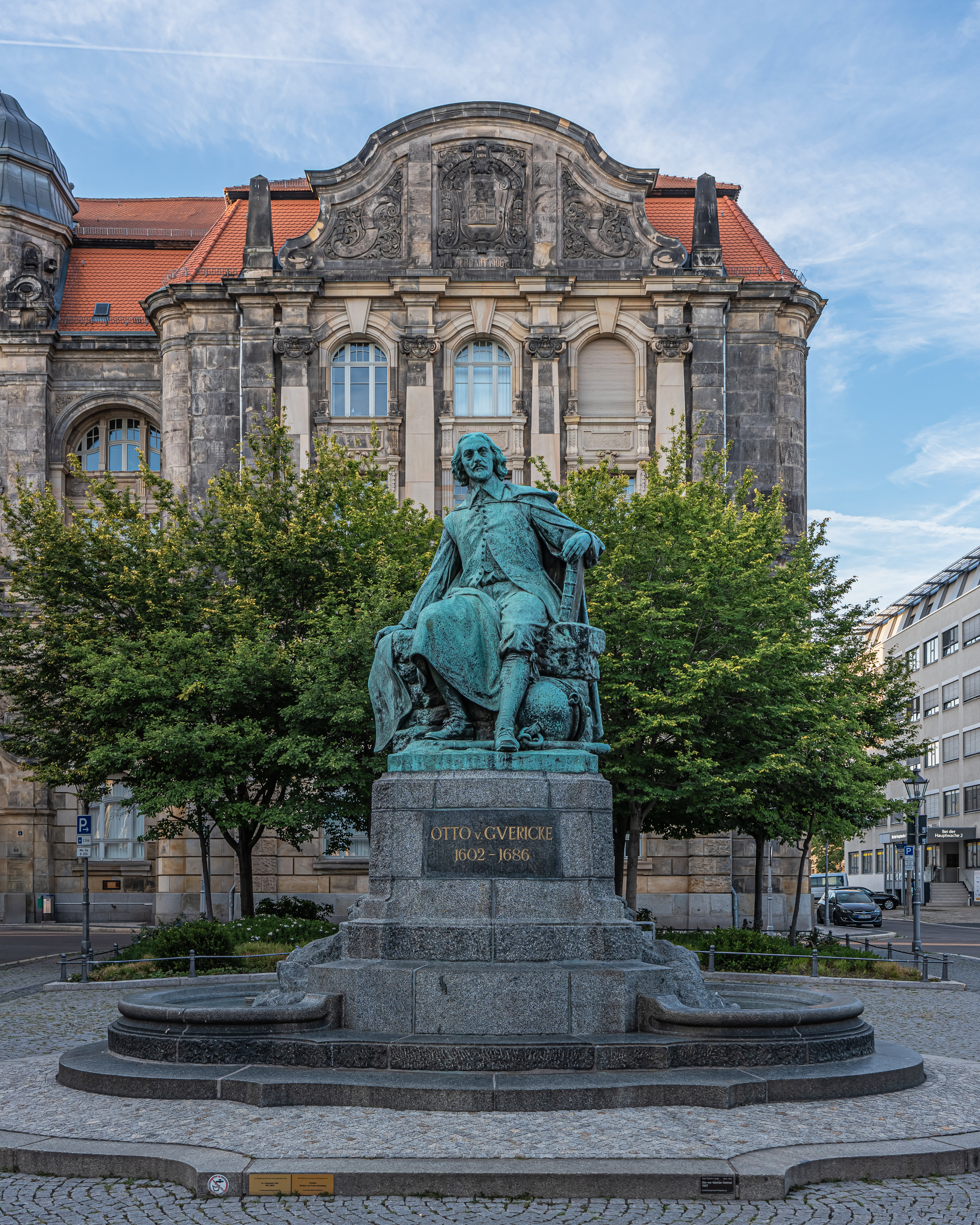
Guericke monument

Carl Friedrich Echtermeier, also known as Carl Echtermeier or Karl Echtermeyer, (27 October 1845 - 30 July 1910) was a German sculptor.

== Life ==
Carl Friedrich Echtermeier, the son of a plasterer in Kassel, Germany, learnt the basics of his craft at his father's workshop. He went on to study at the art academies of Kassel, Munich and Dresden. In his early twenties he earned great acclaim with his statue of a dancing satyr. In 1870, he married Margarete Stubenrauch and embarked on a grand tour through Italy.

In 1871, he founded his own sculptors' workshop in Dresden. In 1883, he started teaching at Braunschweig Polytechnic (today Braunschweig University of Technology). Professor Echtermeier, who also received the official title of "Geheimer Hofrat" (Privy Counsellor), died in Braunschweig in 1910.

Carl Echtermeier was related to the writer Ernst Theodor Echtermeyer (1805 - 1844) and the painter Curt Echtermeyer (1896 - 1971). Possibly following a dispute with one of his three sons, he changed the spelling of his name in 1905.

== Works (selection) ==
- Dancing Satyr (1867/68)
- Dancing Maenad (1870)
- allegories of arts and sciences (1877/79), for foyer of Braunschweig Polytechnic
- marble allegories of eight countries (1882, for Schloss Wilhelmshöhe)
- draft of bronze monument for composer Franz Abt (1891, melted down in Second World War)
- monument of Otto von Bismarck (1899, Magdeburg, destroyed)
- monument for writer Karl Leberecht Immermann (1899, Magdeburg)
- draft of bronze monument for Protestant Reformer Johannes Bugenhagen (1902, Brüdernkirche (Braunschweig), dismantled during Second World War)
- monument for Otto von Guericke in his quality as a scientist (1907, Magedeburg)
- a number of portrait busts in Braunschweig
- a number of tomb statues in Hannover and elsewhere.

== Bibliography ==
- Pingel, Norman-Mathias: Echtermeier, Karl Friedrich in: Braunschweiger Stadtlexikon, Ergänzungsband, herausgegeben im Auftrag der Stadt Braunschweig von Luitgard Camerer, Manfred R. W. Garzmann und Wolf-Dieter Schuegraf unter besonderer Mitarbeit von Norman-Mathias Pingel. Braunschweig, 1996, ISBN 3-926701-30-7, p. 39
- Jarck, Horst-Rüdiger; Scheel, Günter (Hrsg.), Braunschweigisches Biographisches Lexikon. 19. und 20. Jahrhundert. Hannover, 1996, ISBN 978-3-7752-5838-8, p. 151-152
