= Gustav Seyffarth =

German-American Egyptologist (1796–1885)

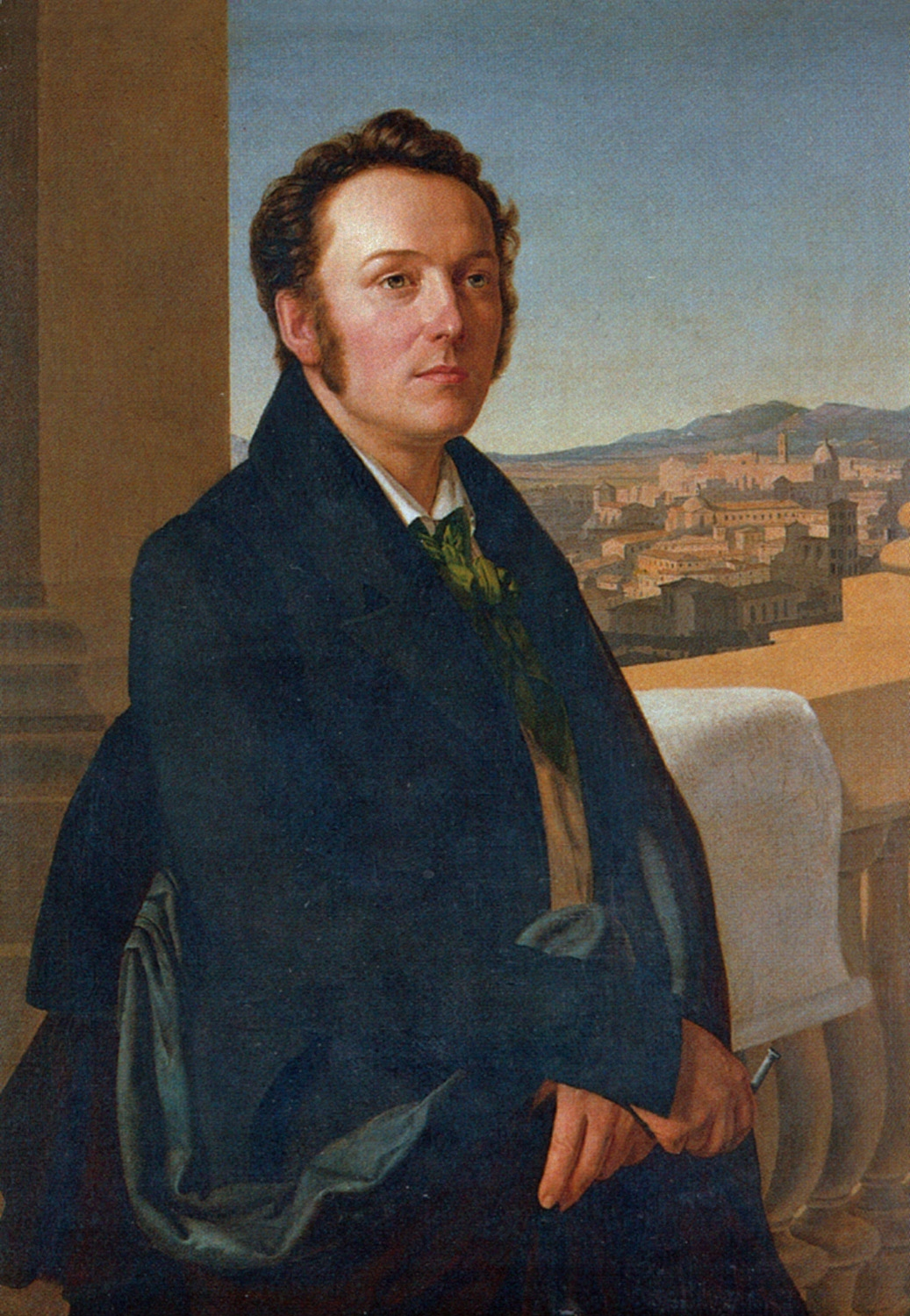
Gustav Seyffarth (1837 portrait)

Gustav Seyffarth (13 July 1796 – 17 November 1885) was a German-American Egyptologist, born in Uebigau, in the Electorate of Saxony.

He studied theology and philology at the University of Leipzig, obtaining his doctorate in 1823 with the thesis "De sonis literarum graecarum tum genuis tum adoptivis". He became a professor of philosophy at Leipzig in 1825 and a professor of archæology in 1830 (a position he held until 1855). From 1826 to 1829 he visited the principal museums of Germany, France, England, and the Netherlands and collected copies of Egyptian inscriptions and Coptic manuscripts. In 1840, on his initiative, a sarcophagus was purchased that was to become the centerpiece of the future Ägyptisches Museum der Universität Leipzig.

In 1856 he came to America and became a professor of church history and archæology at Concordia College, St. Louis. From 1859 he resided in New York City, where he conducted research at the Astor Library.

Seyffarth was an earnest student of Egyptology, but wrongly held that the hieroglyphic characters, with scarcely an exception, were pure phonograms. His method of deciphering hieroglyphics was fundamentally different to that of Jean-François Champollion — with Seyffarth asserting that the hieroglyphs designated the consonant elements of a syllable and Champollion teaching that the hieroglyphs were symbols standing for definite letters of the alphabet.

== Selected works ==
- "De lingua et literis veterum Aegyptiorum: cum permultis tabulis lithographicis", 1825 (with Friedrich August Wilhelm Spohn).
- "Rudimenta Hieroglyphices", 1826.
- Beiträge zur Kenntniss der Literatur, Kunst, Mythologie und Geschichte des alten Aegypten, (1826–1840, 7 parts).
- "Systema astronomiae aegyptiacae quadripartitum", 1833.
- Unser alphabet ein abbild des thierkreises, 1834.
- "Alphabeta Genuina Aegyptiorum", 1840.
- Die Grundsätze der Mythologie und der alten Religionsgeschichte 1843.
- "Grammatica aegyptiaca", 1855.
- "Summary of recent discoveries in Biblical chronology, universal history and Egyptian archæology; with special reference to Dr. Abbott's Egyptian museum in New-York. Together with a translation of the first sacred book of the ancient Egyptians", 1857.
- "An Astronomical Inscription Concerning the Year 1722 B.C.", 1859.
- "The hieroglyphic tablet of Pompeium, grammatically translated and commented on", 1881.
- "The Literary Life of Gustavus Seyffarth ...: An Autobiographical Sketch" (with Karl Knortz), 1886.
