= Robert Zickert =

German footballer

Personal information
- Date of birth: 23 March 1990 (age 36)
- Place of birth: Falkenberg/Elster, East Germany
- Height: 1.84 m (6 ft 0 in)
- Position: Defender

Team information
- Current team: Chemnitzer FC
- Number: 21

Youth career
- –2003: ESV Lok Falkenberg
- 2003–2008: Energie Cottbus

Senior career*
Years	Team	Apps	(Gls)
2008–2011	Energie Cottbus II	54	(8)
2011–2013	Carl Zeiss Jena II	7	(0)
2011–2013	Carl Zeiss Jena	32	(2)
2013–2015	SSV Markranstädt	68	(6)
2015–2020	1. FC Lokomotive Leipzig	133	(9)
2020–	Chemnitzer FC	102	(4)
- * Club domestic league appearances and goals as of 1 January 2025

Robert Zickert (born 23 March 1990) is a German footballer who plays for Chemnitzer FC.
