= Curt Echtermeyer =

Chilean-German painter

Curt Echtermeyer (1896–1971), also known as Curt Bruckner or Curt Bruckner-Echtermeyer, was a Chilean-German painter.

== Life ==
Curt Echtermeyer was born in Valparaíso, Chile, in 1896 as the son of an immigrant who soon returned to Germany, and his Chilean wife. Curt and his sister grew up in Berlin, where he attended art school from 1914. He lived in Paris in 1925/26, taking up contact with other surrealist artists.

The painter was "overlooked" for conscription in the First World War and spared service at the front in the Second World War. Yet it was the Nazi dictatorship which forced him to develop a fundamentally different second style, and the Stalinist dictatorship in the GDR which prompted him to leave Berlin.

In 1962, after the erection of the Berlin Wall, Curt Echtermeyer took up residence in the Old Town of Bamberg, a picturesque Catholic city. At the end of 1969, Curt Echtermeyer and his wife moved to his beloved Spain. From his cottage in the village of San Vicente de Calders (Province of Tarragona), he could see the Mediterranean Sea. On 11 December 1971, Curt and Wally Echtermeyer fell victim to a tragic accident; they were interred at El Vendrell.

This proponent of Modernism pursued an artistic double life – under the name of Curt Bruckner – by providing highly popular canvases in the style of 19th century Realism. As Echtermeyer, the artist often created vast, dark, dreamlike, unsettling scenes, while as Bruckner, he produced intimate, warm, quotidian, idyllic images.

Echtermeyer categorically rejected preparatory studies, drawing directly onto the canvas or wood before applying oil or pastel, and preferred to paint by night. Many oil paintings of his Paris period are relatively small and executed directly on wood, as he lived in various, narrow, lodgings and sometimes used parts of the furniture, for instance the bottom of drawers.

Curt Echtermeyer was related to the writer Ernst Theodor Echtermeyer and the sculptor Carl Friedrich Echtermeier, formerly Echtermeyer. The latter changed his name in 1905, possibly to confirm the break with his eldest son Romolus, Curt’s father.

== Work ==
=== Work as Curt Echtermeyer ===
Echtermeyer’s early work is generally sombre and surreal, populated by pale figures with mask-like faces. Black, grey, brown and dark shades, often punctuated by white or blood-red, prevail in many scenes, while others shine in rainbow colours.

Later, the palette and mood of his paintings lightened, and some approached abstraction, while still teeming with people. His impressions of traditional festivities in Bamberg are reminiscent of fireworks; so is his pastel The Feast of Life from his last years in Spain.

Selection of works signed as Echtermeyer:

- Selbstbildnis (Self-Portrait) (1916)
- Café Boheme Berlin (1922)
- Urwald (Jungle) (1924)
- Mondgöttin (Moon Goddess) (ca. 1925)
- Tanzender Tod (Dancing Death) (ca. 1925)
- Tomaten (Tomatoes) (1927)
- Legende (Legend) (1929)
- Selbstbildnis (Self-Portrait) (ca. 1938)
- Selbstbildnis (Self-Portrait) (1946/47)
- Bildnis eines Tänzers (Portrait of a Dancer)
- Zirkus – buntes Treiben in der Arena (Circus)
- Madame Zebra (1948)
- Prozession in Bamberg I-III, Sandkerwa in Bamberg (1963)
- Das Fest des Lebens (The Feast of Life) (1970)

=== Work as Curt Bruckner ===
Curt Echtermeyer was prompted to turn to interiors by the changed political circumstances in the thirties. After the war, his dexterity earned him a regular and comfortable income with Berlin art dealer Werner Karst, who established a production line of popular and affordable genre scenes for German homes. Amongst a flood of mainly German landscapes, Curt Bruckner seems to have been one of the few suppliers of figurative motives, billed as “specialist in Old Masters”.

His genre views often depict comfortable middle-class men in the pursuit of their trades or hobbies, for example making or playing musical instruments. Many of these are set in the past – either the nineteenth century, whose artistic style they emulate, or those preceding. The genre scenes are dominated by a warm golden brown, contrasting with the melancholy ashen tones of Echtermeyer's surrealist and expressionist imagery.

The historical interiors contain a large collection with books, globes, plans, models and framed paintings. The artist sometimes signed the picture with "C. Bruckner pinx.".

== Bibliography ==
- Curt Echtermeyer, 1896 bis 1971 : Ölbilder und Pastelle. Photo gallery by Klaus Spermann.
- Rüdiger Preisler: Meine Begegnung mit dem Maler Curt Echtermeyer. In: Curt Echtermeyer, 1896 - 1971 : Ölbilder und Pastelle. Berlin : Galerie Bassenge; Archiv Klaus Spermann, [2014]
- Barbara Borek: Die Kraft der Bilder. Published online 26 Jan 2014.
- "Vierzig Prozent Alpen". DER SPIEGEL. No. 49. November 30, 1955. pp. 65–67. Archived from the original on September 25, 2015.
