= Emil Winkler =

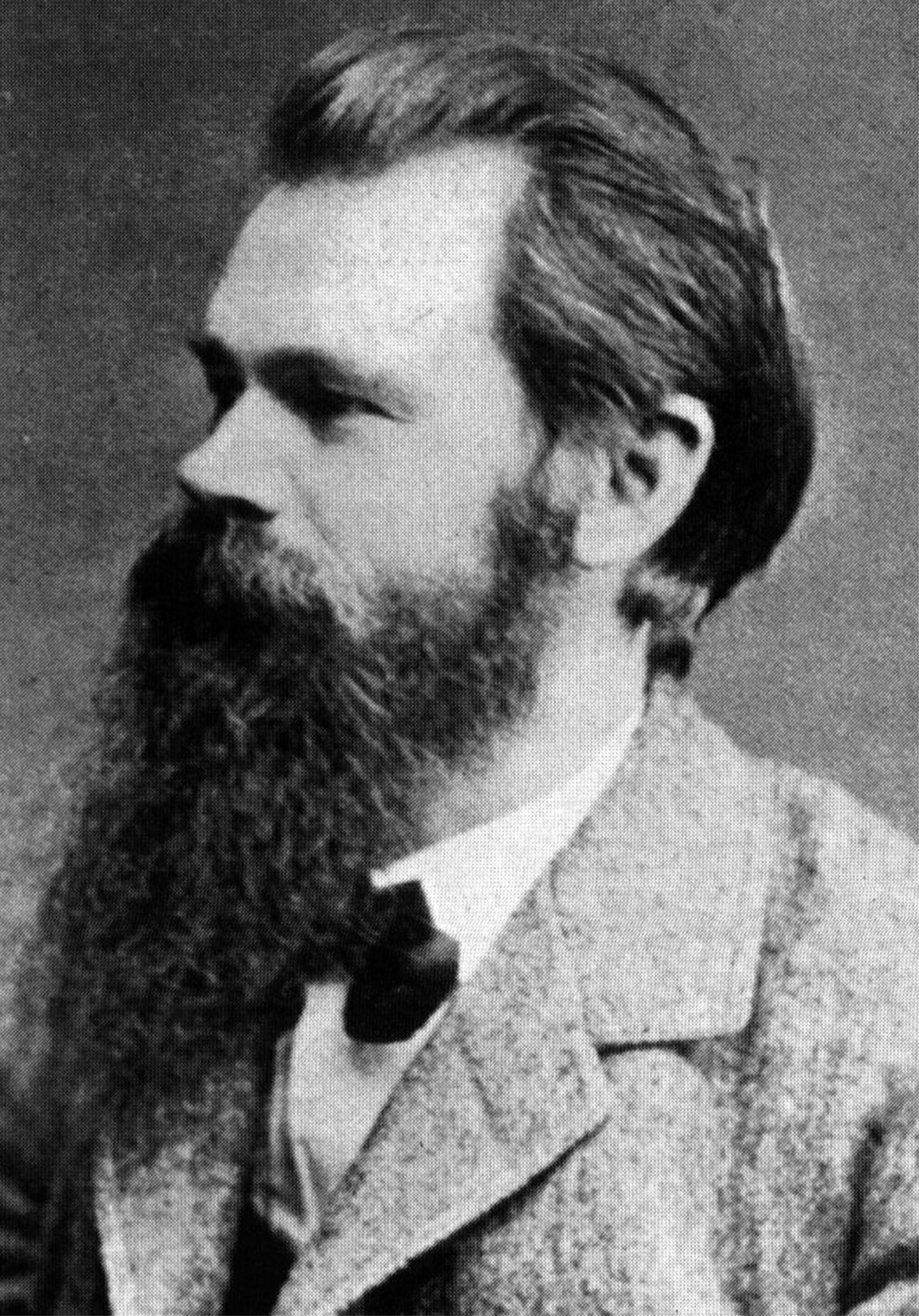
Emil Winkler

Emil Winkler (18 April 1835, Falkenberg bei Torgau – 27 August 1888, Berlin) was a German civil engineer, professor with broad academic interest including engineering mechanics, railway engineering, bridge engineering. Emil Winkler was first to formulate and solve a problem of elastic beam on deformable foundation. The model of a beam on elastic foundation which assumes linear force-deflection relationship is known as Winkler Foundation.

Emil Winkler studied in Dresden. From 1860, he earned his PhD at the University of Leipzig. He also gave courses in Dresden. He moved to Prague (1865) and Vienna (1868), where he was appointed professor. Although he was in Prague only three years these years were very productive. Professor Winkler published in Prague two books: Lecture on Railway Engineering (1867) and Theory of Elasticity and Strength of Materials (1867). In 1877 he moved to Berlin and taught at the Bauakademie. He also studied influence lines and came up with so called Winkler's unevenness.
