= Friedrich August Wilhelm Spohn =

German classical philologist

Friedrich August Wilhelm Spohn (16 May 1792, Dortmund – 17 January 1824, Leipzig) was a German classical philologist. He was the son of theologian Gottlieb Lebrecht Spohn (1756–1794).

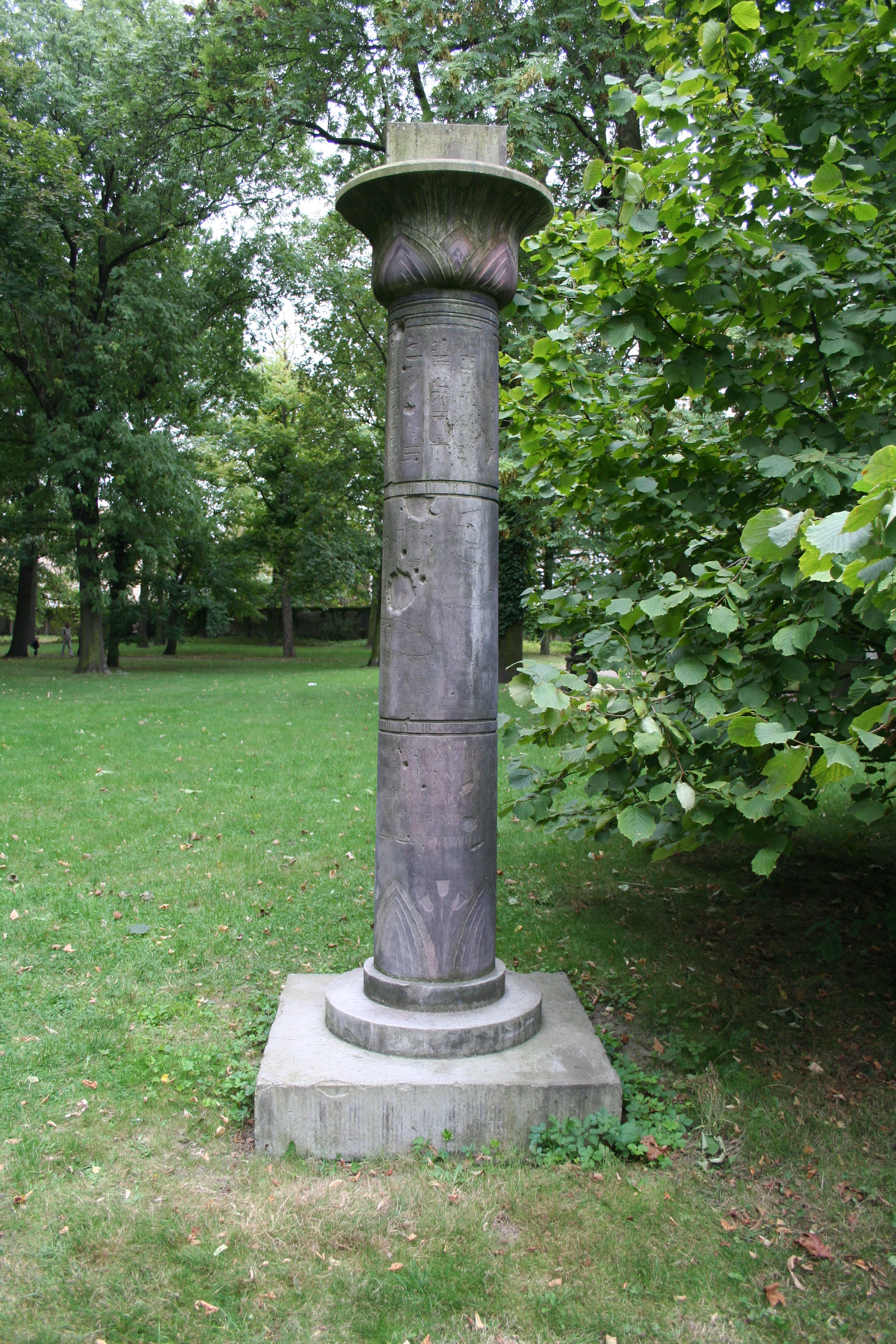
Grave pillar (Grabsäule) of Spohn at Alten Johannisfriedhof in Leipzig.

In 1818 he became an associate professor of philosophy at the University of Leipzig, where during the following year he was appointed professor of Greek and Roman literature. He died in Leipzig on 17 January 1824, aged 31.

In addition to his work as a classical philologist, he was involved in early attempts at decipherment of Egyptian hieroglyphs. His grave marker at the Alten Johannisfriedhof in Leipzig is a column adorned with hieroglyphs.

== Selected works ==
- "De agro Troiano in carminibus Homericis descripto. Commentatio geographico-critica", 1814.
- "De extrema Odysseae parte", 1816.
- "Isocratis Panegyricus", 1817, edition of Isocrates' panegyrics.
- "Hesiodi Opera et dies", 1819, edition of Hesiod.
- "Lectiones Theocriteae 1822–23, (Lessons of Theocritus).
- "De lingua et literis veterum Aegyptiorum", 1825, (with Gustav Seyffarth).
