= Uebigau-Wahrenbrück =

- Town
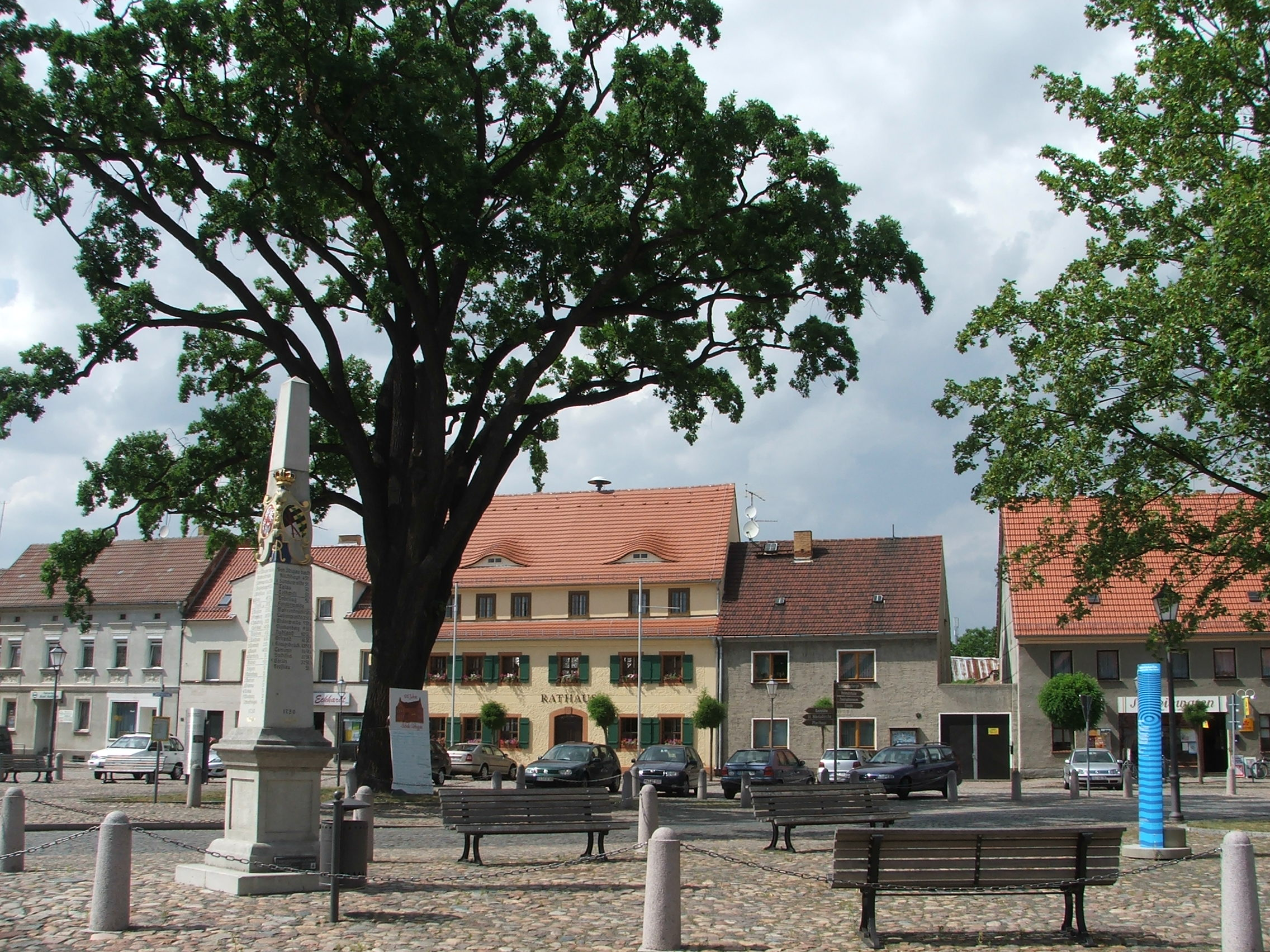
- Market square in Uebigau

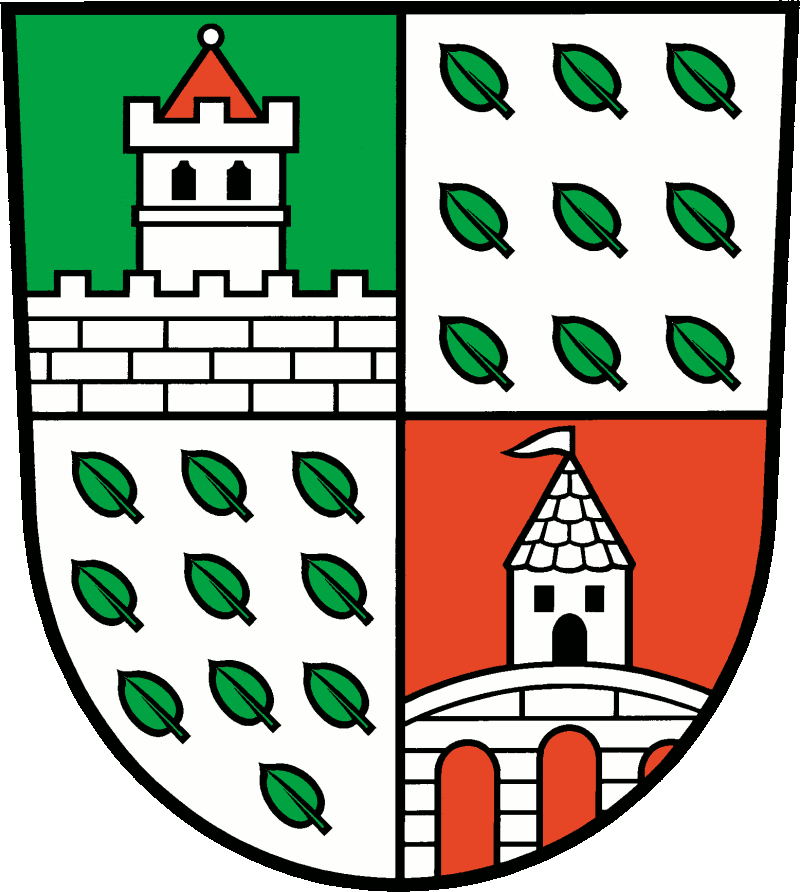
- Coat of arms

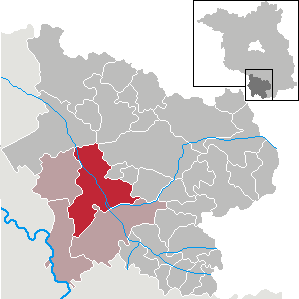
- Location of Uebigau-Wahrenbrück within Elbe-Elster district
- Interactive map of Uebigau-Wahrenbrück
- Location within Germany Location within Brandenburg
- Coordinates: 51°33′N 13°21′E
- Country: Germany
- State: Brandenburg
- District: Elbe-Elster
- Municipal assoc.: Liebenwerda

Government
  - Mayor (2020–25): Dittgard Hapich

Area
  - Total: 135.61 km^{2} (52.36 sq mi)
- Elevation: 84 m (276 ft)

Population (2025-12-31)
  - Total: 4,847
  - Density: 35.74/km^{2} (92.57/sq mi)
- Time zone: UTC+01:00 (CET)
  - Summer (DST): UTC+02:00 (CEST)
- Postal codes: 04924, 04938
- Dialling codes: 035365
- Vehicle registration: EE, FI, LIB
- Website: www.uebigau-wahrenbrueck.de

Uebigau-Wahrenbrück (German pronunciation: [ˈyːbiɡaʊ ˈvaːʁənbʁʏk]) is a town in the Elbe-Elster district, in southwestern Brandenburg, Germany. It is situated on the river Schwarze Elster, 11 km northwest of Bad Liebenwerda, and 21 km east of Torgau.

== Geography ==
The town is composed by the villages of Bahnsdorf, Beiersdorf, Beutersitz, Bomsdorf, Bönitz, Domsdorf, Drasdo, Kauxdorf, Langennaundorf, Marxdorf, München/Elster, Neudeck, Prestewitz, Rothstein, Saxdorf, Uebigau (municipal seat), Wahrenbrück, Wiederau, Wildgrube, Winkel and Zinsdorf.

== History ==
From 1815 to 1944, the constituent localities of Uebigau-Wahrenbrück were part of the Prussian Province of Saxony. From 1944 to 1945, they were part of the Province of Halle-Merseburg. From 1952 to 1990, they were part of the Bezirk Cottbus of East Germany. On 31 December 2001, the town of Uebigau-Wahrenbrück was formed by merging the towns of Uebigau and Wahrenbrück with the municipalities of Bahnsdorf, Drasdo and Wiederau.

== Demography ==
Development of Population since 1875 within the Current Boundaries (Blue Line: Population; Dotted Line: Comparison to Population Development of Brandenburg state; Grey Background: Time of Nazi rule; Red Background: Time of Communist rule)

Recent Population Development and Projections (Population Development before Census 2011 (blue line); Recent Population Development according to the Census in Germany in 2011 (blue bordered line); Official projections for 2005-2030 (yellow line); for 2017-2030 (scarlet line)

Uebigau-Wahrenbrück: Population development
within the current boundaries (2013)

Year	Pop.	±% p.a.
1875	6,311	—
1890	6,667	+0.37%
1910	7,470	+0.57%
1925	8,253	+0.67%
1933	8,137	−0.18%
1939	8,206	+0.14%
1946	11,773	+5.29%
1950	11,524	−0.53%
1964	8,942	−1.80%
1971	8,743	−0.32%
1981	7,707	−1.25%
1985	7,556	−0.49%
1989	7,359	−0.66%
1990	7,264	−1.29%
1991	7,109	−2.13%

Year	Pop.	±% p.a.
1992	7,066	−0.60%
1993	7,023	−0.61%
1994	7,027	+0.06%
1995	6,922	−1.49%
1996	6,948	+0.38%
1997	6,959	+0.16%
1998	6,913	−0.66%
1999	6,915	+0.03%
2000	6,845	−1.01%
2001	6,727	−1.72%
2002	6,624	−1.53%
2003	6,550	−1.12%
2004	6,521	−0.44%
2005	6,392	−1.98%
2006	6,259	−2.08%

Year	Pop.	±% p.a.
2007	6,145	−1.82%
2008	6,007	−2.25%
2009	5,892	−1.91%
2010	5,769	−2.09%
2011	5,755	−0.24%
2012	5,717	−0.66%
2013	5,598	−2.08%
2014	5,532	−1.18%
2015	5,462	−1.27%
2016	5,324	−2.53%
2017	5,321	−0.06%
2018	5,245	−1.43%
2019	5,206	−0.74%
2020	5,233	+0.52%

== See also ==
- Marxdorfer Wolfshund

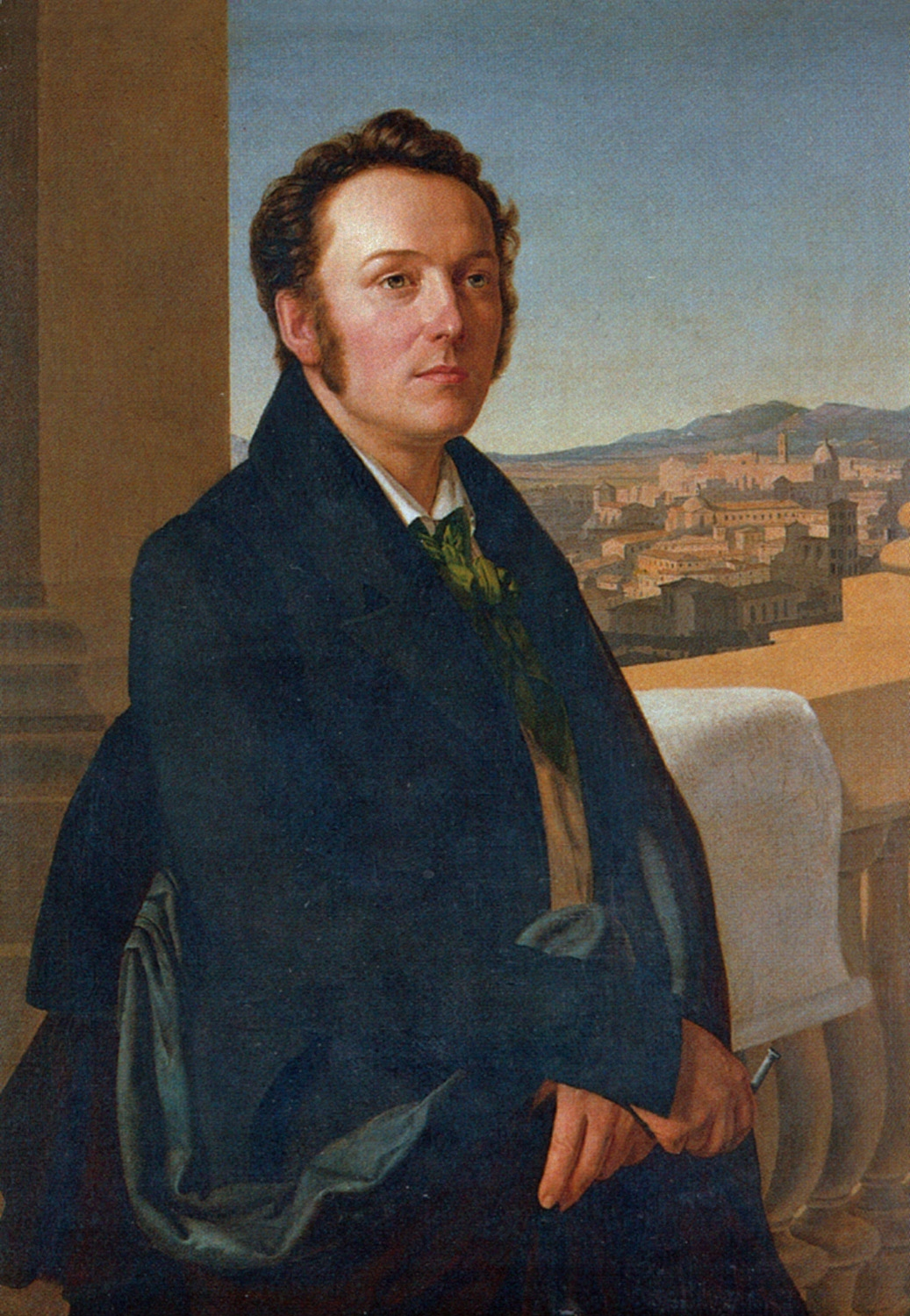
Gustav Seyffarth, 1837

== Notable people ==
- Johann Gottlieb Graun (1702–1771), a German Baroque/Classical era composer and violinist
- Carl Heinrich Graun (1704–1759), a German composer and tenor.
- Gustav Seyffarth (1796–1885), a German-American Egyptologist
