= Falkenberg/Elster =

- Town
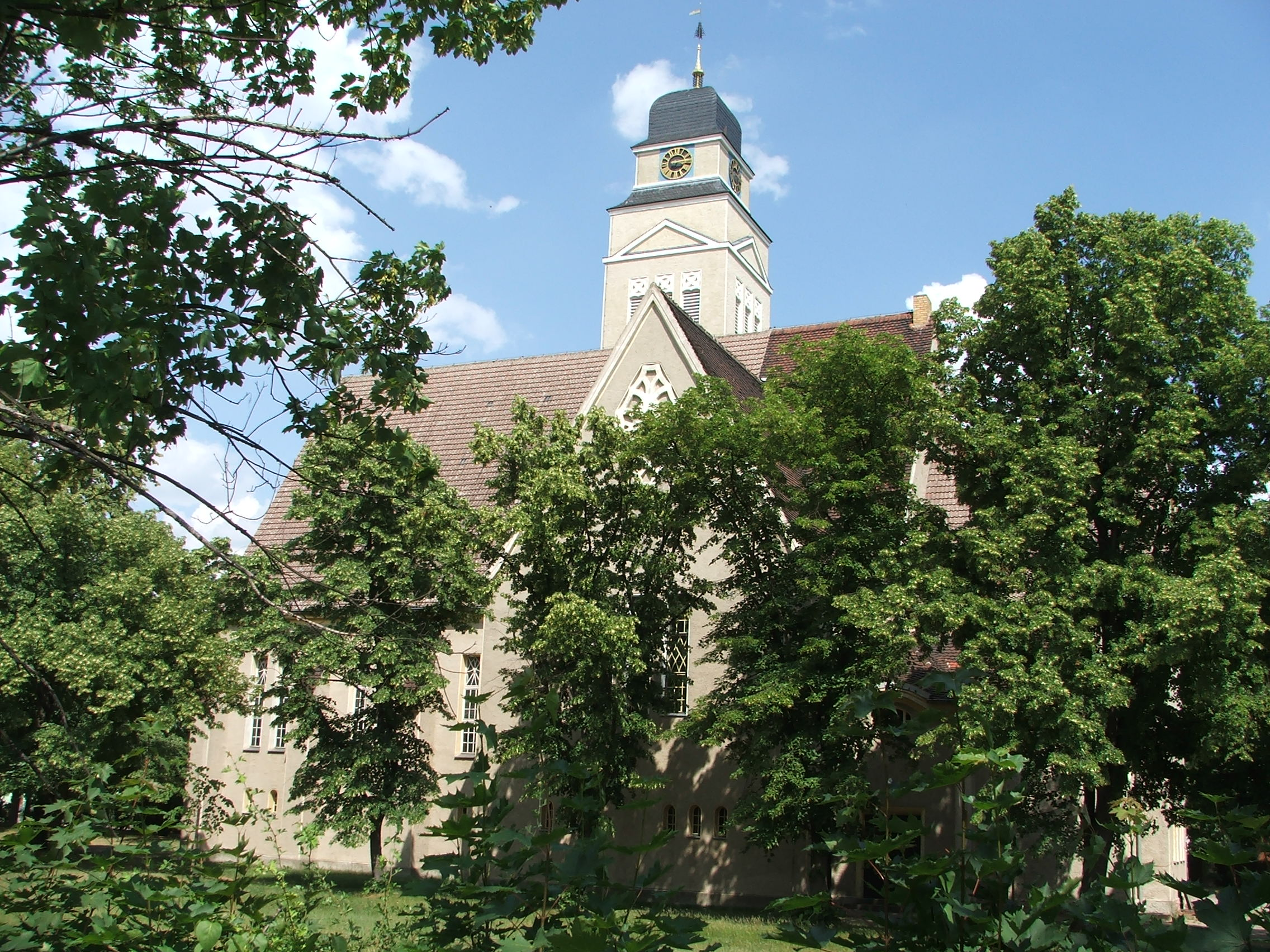
- Church in Falkenberg/Elster

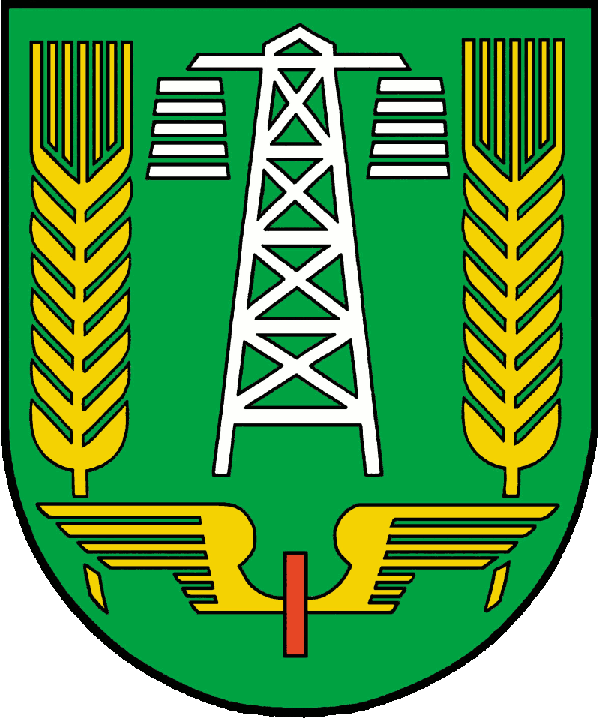
- Coat of arms

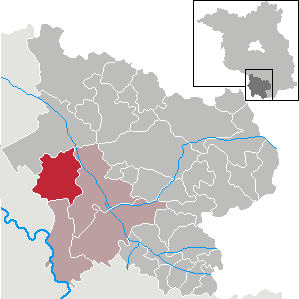
- Location of Falkenberg/Elster within Elbe-Elster district
- Interactive map of Falkenberg/Elster
- Location within Germany Location within Brandenburg
- Coordinates: 51°34′59″N 13°13′56″E
- Country: Germany
- State: Brandenburg
- District: Elbe-Elster
- Municipal assoc.: Liebenwerda
- Subdivisions: 5 Ortsteile

Government
  - Mayor (2020–25): Stephan Bawey

Area
  - Total: 82.16 km^{2} (31.72 sq mi)
- Elevation: 86 m (282 ft)

Population (2025-12-31)
  - Total: 6,036
  - Density: 73.47/km^{2} (190.3/sq mi)
- Time zone: UTC+01:00 (CET)
  - Summer (DST): UTC+02:00 (CEST)
- Postal codes: 04895
- Dialling codes: 035365
- Vehicle registration: EE, FI, LIB
- Website: www.falkenberg-elster.de

Falkenberg (German pronunciation: [ˈfalkŋ̍ˌbɛʁk]) is a town in the Elbe-Elster district, in southwestern Brandenburg, Germany. It is situated near the river Schwarze Elster, 16 km east of Torgau, and 13 km northwest of Bad Liebenwerda.

== History ==
It was first mentioned in 1251. In 1547 the Battle of Mühlberg was decided in the vicinity of Falkenberg when the Saxon prince-elector Johann Friedrich I. was taken prisoner. The village itself remained of low importance until the 19th century. The manor changed hands several times, until it was bought by the municipality in 1911. From 1815 to 1944, Falkenberg was part of the Prussian Province of Saxony. In 1848, Falkenberg (Elster) station was opened on the railway Jüterbog–Röderau railway. The Halle–Cottbus railway was opened in 1872 and crossed the former at Falkenberg which became a major junction and grew considerably. Industry and businesses were established, including a power station. World War II caused major destruction. From 1944 to 1945, Falkenberg was part of the Province of Halle-Merseburg. From 1952 to 1990, it was part of the Bezirk Cottbus of East Germany. In 1962 Falkenberg was awarded town privileges. The coat of arms reflects the major branches of economy in the town: energy supply, railway, and agriculture.

Large numbers of derelict steam locomotives are stored at an old railway depot just to the north-east.

== Demography ==
Development of Population since 1875 within the Current Boundaries (Blue Line: Population; Dotted Line: Comparison to Population Development of Brandenburg state; Grey Background: Time of Nazi rule; Red Background: Time of Communist rule)

Recent Population Development (Blue Line) and Forecasts

Falkenberg/Elster: Population development
within the current boundaries (2017)

Year	Pop.	±% p.a.
1875	2,850	—
1890	3,120	+0.61%
1910	6,031	+3.35%
1925	7,763	+1.70%
1933	8,578	+1.26%
1939	9,194	+1.16%
1946	11,941	+3.81%
1950	11,273	−1.43%
1964	10,346	−0.61%
1971	10,596	+0.34%
1981	9,827	−0.75%
1985	9,749	−0.20%
1989	9,573	−0.45%
1990	9,443	−1.36%
1991	9,271	−1.82%

Year	Pop.	±% p.a.
1992	9,138	−1.43%
1993	9,131	−0.08%
1994	9,091	−0.44%
1995	9,064	−0.30%
1996	8,974	−0.99%
1997	8,854	−1.34%
1998	8,689	−1.86%
1999	8,554	−1.55%
2000	8,435	−1.39%
2001	8,262	−2.05%
2002	8,075	−2.26%
2003	7,953	−1.51%
2004	7,819	−1.68%
2005	7,768	−0.65%
2006	7,627	−1.82%

Year	Pop.	±% p.a.
2007	7,497	−1.70%
2008	7,378	−1.59%
2009	7,254	−1.68%
2010	7,098	−2.15%
2011	6,812	−4.03%
2012	6,650	−2.38%
2013	6,561	−1.34%
2014	6,529	−0.49%
2015	6,431	−1.50%
2016	6,459	+0.44%
2017	6,406	−0.82%
2018	6,368	−0.59%
2019	6,315	−0.83%
2020	6,317	+0.03%

=== Sons and daughters of the city ===
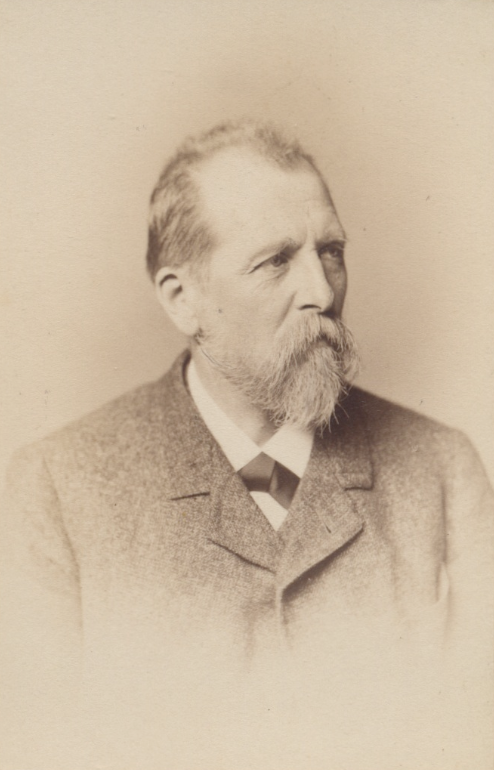
Ernst Hildebrand 1887

- Ernst Hildebrand (1833–1924), painter
- Emil Winkler (1835–1888), engineer
- Lothar Schneider (born 1943), cartoonist
- Robert Zickert (born 1990), footballer

=== Other personalities associated with the city ===
- Steffen Blochwitz (born 1967), cyclist
