= Björn Lüttmann =

German politician (born 1975)

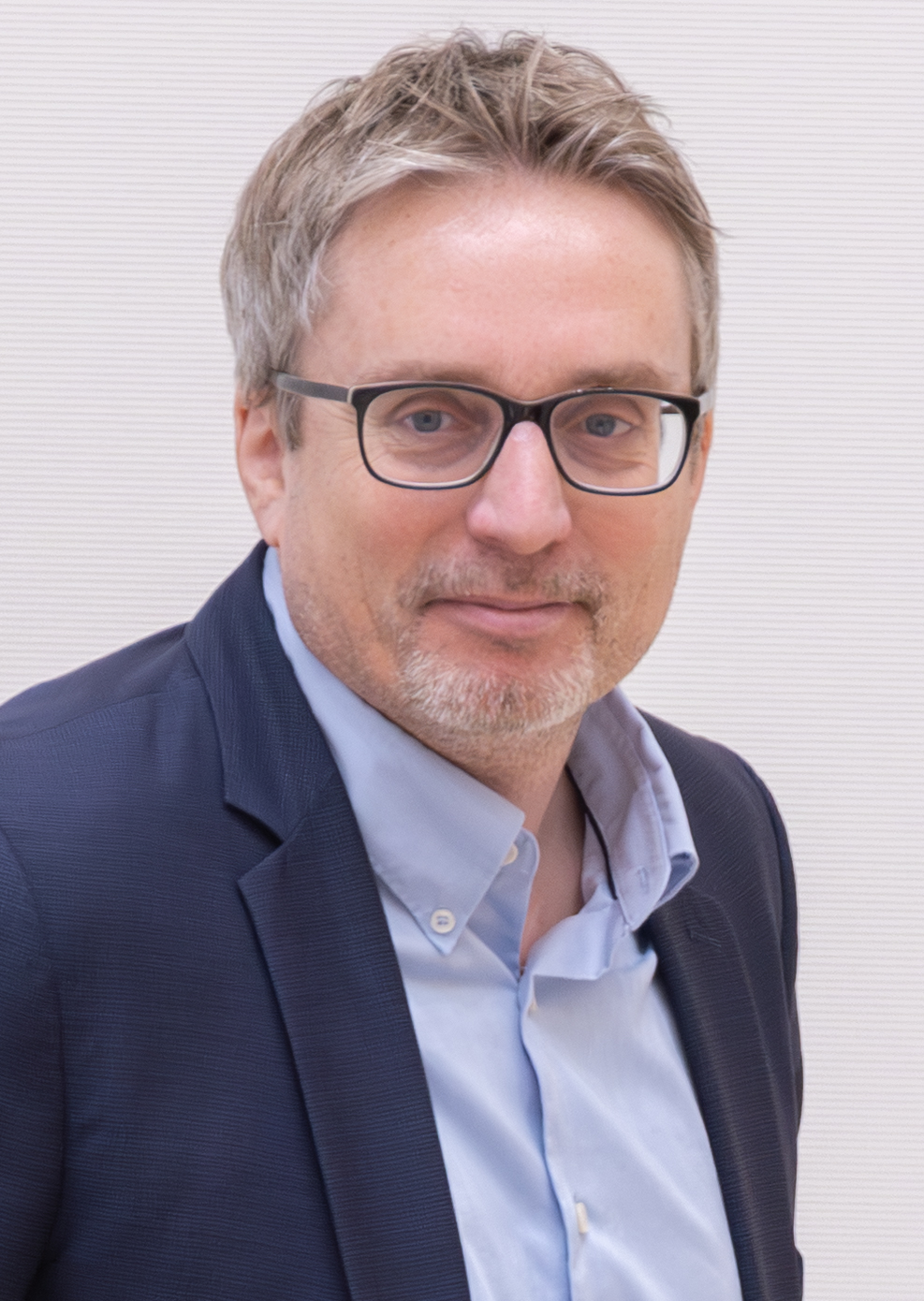
- Lüttmann in 2025

Member of the Landtag of Brandenburg
- Incumbent
- Assumed office 8 October 2014
- Preceded by: Gerrit Große
- Constituency: Oberhavel III (2014–2024)

Personal details
- Born: 11 December 1975 (age 50)
- Party: Social Democratic Party (since 2000)

Björn Lüttmann (born 11 December 1975) is a German politician serving as a member of the Landtag of Brandenburg since 2014. He has served as group leader of the Social Democratic Party since 2024.
