= Nicole Walter-Mundt =

German politician (born 1977)

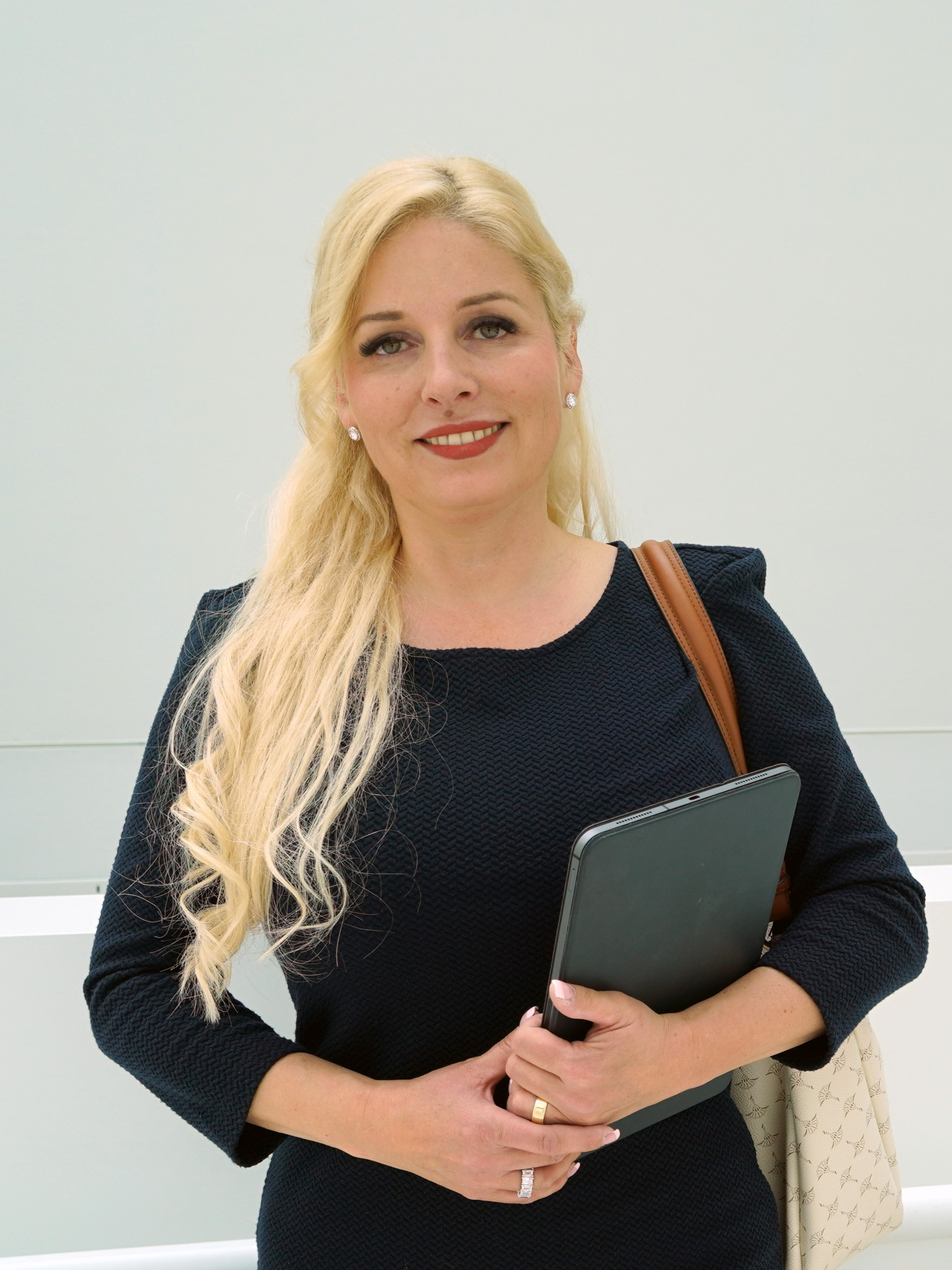
- Walter-Mundt in 2022

Member of the Landtag of Brandenburg
- Incumbent
- Assumed office 25 November 2019
- Preceded by: Rainer Genilke

Personal details
- Born: 1977 (age 48–49) Oranienburg
- Party: Christian Democratic Union (since 2008)

Nicole Walter-Mundt (born 1977 in Oranienburg) is a German politician serving as a member of the Landtag of Brandenburg since 2019. She has served as chairwoman of the committee on internal affairs and local government since 2025.
