= Finsterwalde Solar Park =

Photovoltaic plant in Finsterwalde, Germany

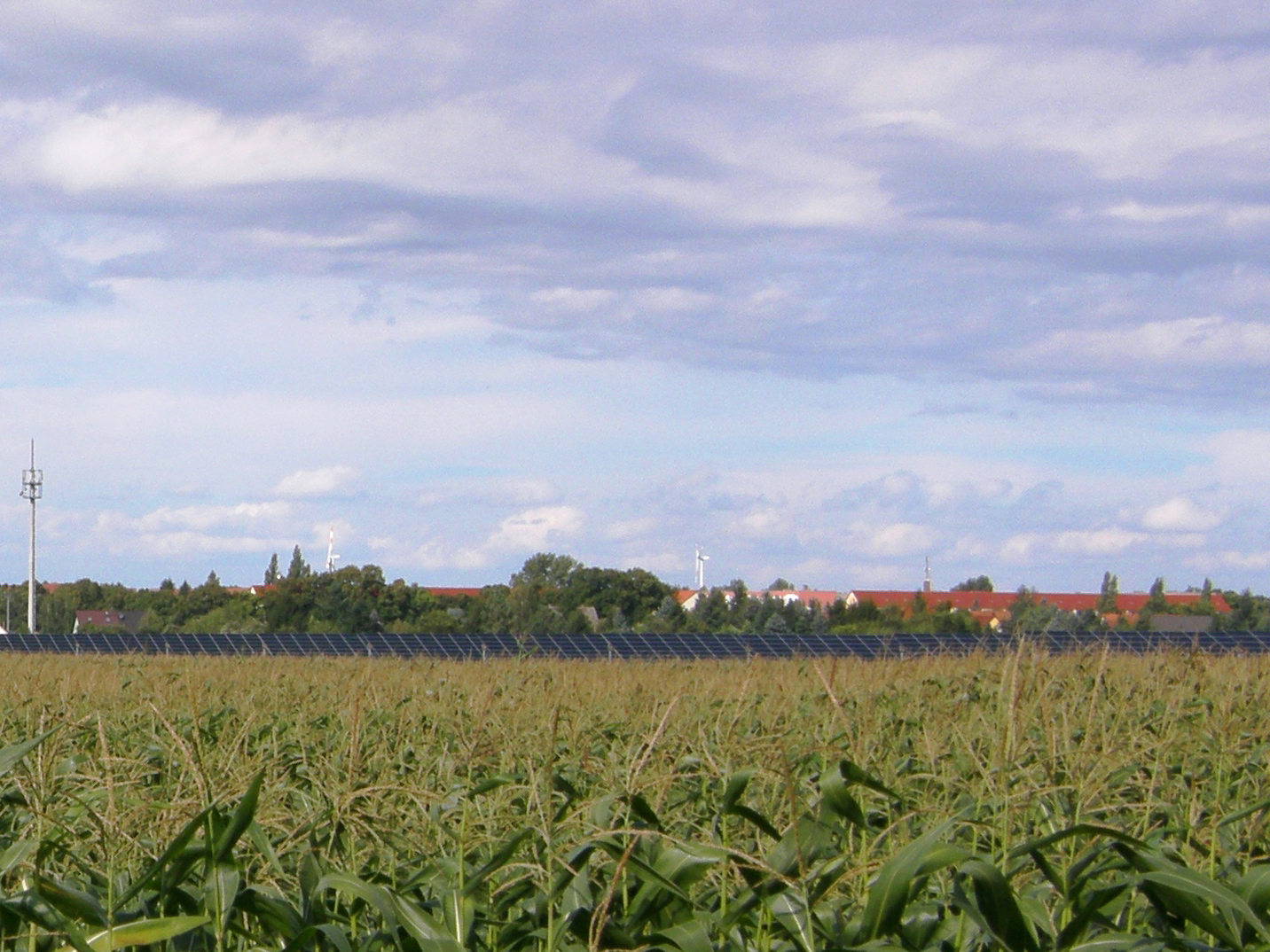
- Country: Germany
- Location: Finsterwalde, Brandenburg
- Coordinates: 51°34′16″N 13°45′00″E
- Status: Operational
- Commission date: 2010
- Owners: LHI Leasing (Finsterwalde I); Blue Forrest Solar Holding (Finsterwalde II and III)

Solar farm
- Type: Flat-panel PV

Thermal power station
- Primary fuel: Solar energy

Power generation
- Nameplate capacity: 80.7 MW

The Finsterwalde Solar Park was, in November 2010, the world's largest photovoltaic plant with 80.7 MW_{p}. The project is located in Finsterwalde, Germany and is equipped with Q-Cells modules and LDK solar wafers.

The first phase of the project was commissioned in 2009, the second and third in 2010. All phases were developed by Unlimited Energy GmbH. Phase I was sold to LQ Energy GmbH, a joint venture of Q-Cells International and LDK Solar. In 2011, Finsterwalde I was sold to LHI Leasing, a joint venture of Landesbank Baden-Württemberg and Nord/LB.

In 2010, Unlimited Energy sold phase II and III to Q-Cells International. In 2011, Q-Cells sold Finsterwalde II and III to Blue Forrest Solar Holding, a joint venture of DIF Infrastructure and the NIBC European Infrastructure Fund.

== See also ==
- Photovoltaic power station
- List of photovoltaic power stations
