= Liebenwerda (Verbandsgemeinde) =

- Verbandsgemeinde
- Coat of arms

- Map of Elbe-Elster highlighting Liebenwerda
- Interactive map of Liebenwerda
- Location within Germany Location within Brandenburg
- Coordinates: 51°31′N 13°24′E
- Country: Germany
- State: Brandenburg
- District: Elbe-Elster
- Seat: Bad Liebenwerda
- Subdivisions: 4 municipalities

Area
  - Total: 445.85 km^{2} (172.14 sq mi)

Population (2025-12-31)
  - Total: 22,971
  - Density: 51.522/km^{2} (133.44/sq mi)
- Time zone: UTC+01:00 (CET)
  - Summer (DST): UTC+02:00 (CEST)
- Website: www.verbandsgemeinde-liebenwerda.de

Liebenwerda is a Verbandsgemeinde ("collective municipality") in the district of Elbe-Elster, in Brandenburg, Germany. Its seat is in Bad Liebenwerda. It was established in January 2020.

The Verbandsgemeinde Liebenwerda consists of the following municipalities:

1. Bad Liebenwerda
2. Falkenberg/Elster
3. Mühlberg
4. Uebigau-Wahrenbrück

== Demography ==
Development of Population since 1875 within the Current Boundaries (Blue Line: Population; Dotted Line: Comparison to Population Development of Brandenburg state; Grey Background: Time of Nazi rule; Red Background: Time of Communist rule)

Recent Population Development and Projections (Population Development before Census 2011 (blue line); Recent Population Development according to the Census in Germany in 2011 (blue bordered line); Official projections for 2005-2030 (yellow line); for 2017-2030 (scarlet line); for 2020-2030 (green line)

Verbandsgemeinde Liebenwerda: Population development
within the current boundaries (2020)

Year	Pop.	±% p.a.
1875	22,344	—
1890	23,699	+0.39%
1910	28,471	+0.92%
1925	32,203	+0.82%
1933	33,260	+0.40%
1939	35,112	+0.91%
1946	47,150	+4.30%
1950	45,916	−0.66%
1964	39,440	−1.08%
1971	39,860	+0.15%
1981	36,657	−0.83%

Year	Pop.	±% p.a.
1985	36,099	−0.38%
1989	35,248	−0.59%
1990	34,720	−1.50%
1995	33,297	−0.83%
2000	31,791	−0.92%
2005	29,578	−1.43%
2010	27,084	−1.75%
2015	25,054	−1.55%
2020	24,404	−0.52%
2025	22,971	−1.20%
