= Mühlberg, Brandenburg =

Mühlberg
- Town
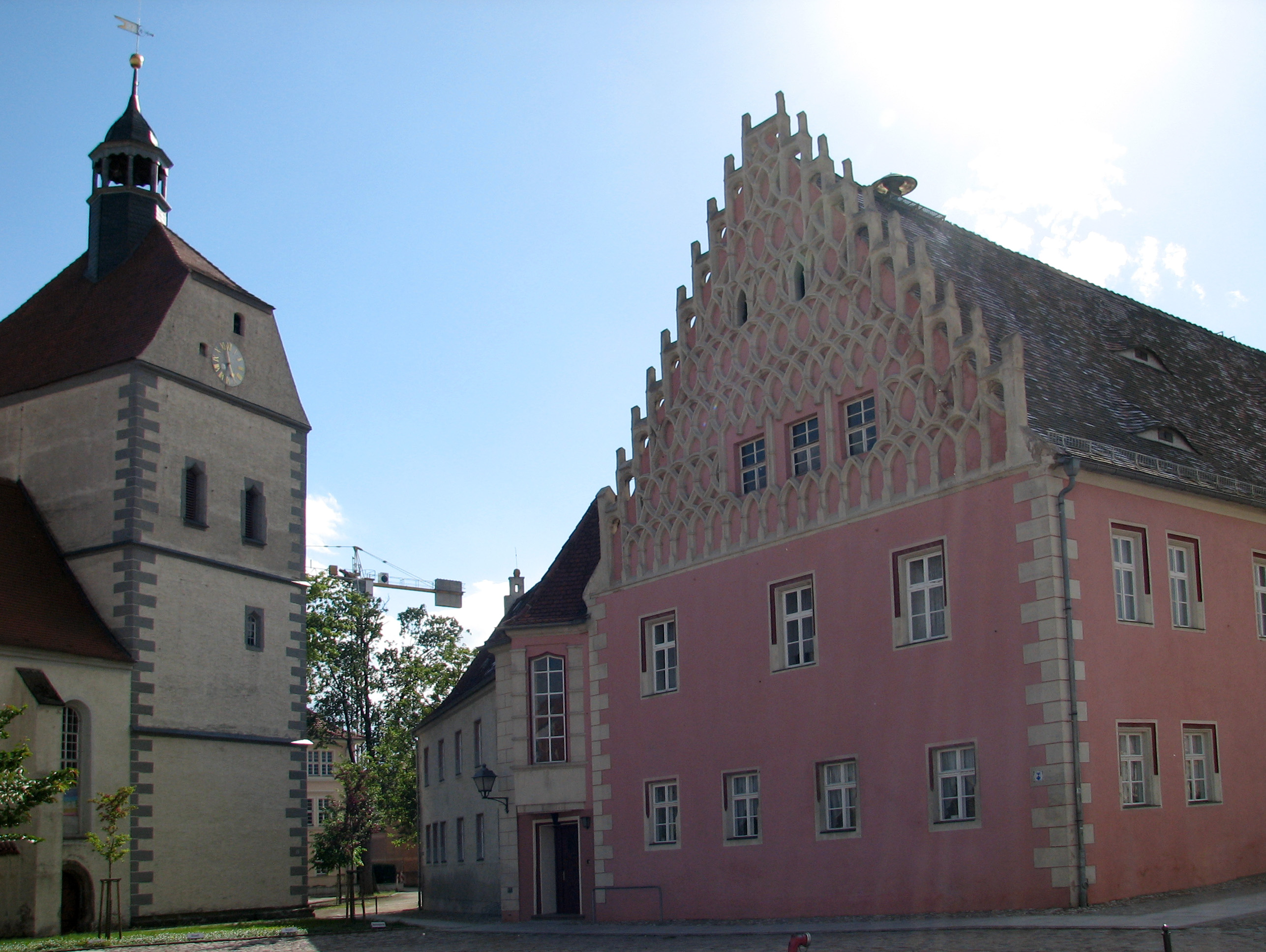
- Church and town hall

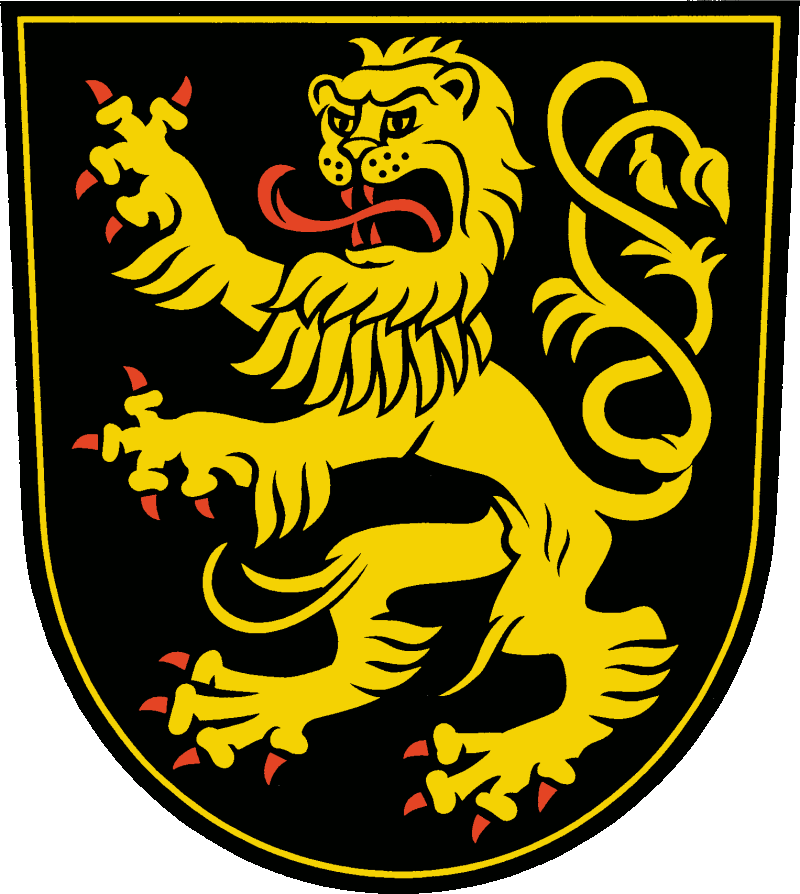
- Coat of arms

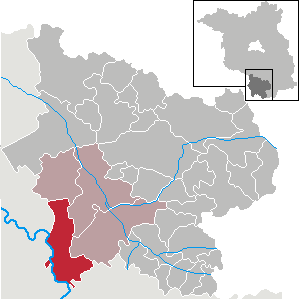
- Location of Mühlberg within Elbe-Elster district
- Interactive map of Mühlberg
- Location within Germany Location within Brandenburg
- Coordinates: 51°25′59″N 13°13′00″E
- Country: Germany
- State: Brandenburg
- District: Elbe-Elster
- Municipal assoc.: Liebenwerda
- Subdivisions: 5 Ortsteile

Government
  - Mayor (2020–25): Sam Welsh

Area
  - Total: 89.2 km^{2} (34.4 sq mi)
- Elevation: 91 m (299 ft)

Population (2025-12-31)
  - Total: 3,253
  - Density: 36.5/km^{2} (94.5/sq mi)
- Time zone: UTC+01:00 (CET)
  - Summer (DST): UTC+02:00 (CEST)
- Postal codes: 04931
- Dialling codes: 035342
- Vehicle registration: EE, FI, LIB
- Website: www.muehlberg-elbe.de

Mühlberg (German pronunciation: [ˈmyːlbɛʁk]) is a town in the Elbe-Elster district, in the southwesternmost part of Brandenburg, Germany. It is located on the right bank of the river Elbe, about halfway between Riesa to the south and Torgau to the northwest. It is about 60 km east of Leipzig. It is accessed by the Bundesstraße 182 (Riesa - Torgau - Wittenberg) on the left bank of the Elbe, connected with the town by a bridge, opened in 2008. Mühlberg consists of the Ortsteile Mühlberg, Altenau, Brottewitz, Fichtenberg, Koßdorf and Martinskirchen.

== History ==
The earliest documentary mention of Mühlberg is in 1230. The town was founded on a sandy island where the River Elbe could be crossed under protection of a castle. There is archaeological evidence, in the form of burials, of Slavic settlement dating back to ca. 600 A.D. During the middle ages lordship over the city shifted several times between the Bohemian noble family of the House of Berka of Dubá and the House of Wettin. The forces of Charles V, Holy Roman Emperor defeated the Schmalkaldic League at the Battle of Mühlberg near the castle on April 24, 1547. From 1939 to 1945 there existed a World War II prisoner-of-war camp (Stalag IV-B) near Mühlberg. About 300,000 prisoners passed the camp and about 3000, most of them Soviet soldiers, died there. After World War II the camp was re-used by the Soviet secret service NKVD as NKVD Special Camp No. 1. About 6,700 of the 22,000 prisoners of the NKVD are buried in mass graves near the camp area. Today a memorial area remembers on the victims of both camp periods. From 1952 to 1990, Mühlberg was part of the Bezirk Cottbus of East Germany.

== Demography ==
Development of Population since 1875 within the Current Boundaries (Blue Line: Population; Dotted Line: Comparison to Population Development of Brandenburg state; Grey Background: Time of Nazi rule; Red Background: Time of Communist rule)

Recent Population Development and Projections (Population Development before Census 2011 (blue line); Recent Population Development according to the Census in Germany in 2011 (blue bordered line); Official projections for 2005-2030 (yellow line); for 2017-2030 (scarlet line)

Mühlberg/Elbe: Population development
within the current boundaries (2020)

Year	Pop.	±% p.a.
1875	5,468	—
1890	5,854	+0.46%
1910	5,895	+0.03%
1925	6,244	+0.38%
1933	6,288	+0.09%
1939	6,700	+1.06%
1946	8,862	+4.08%
1950	8,660	−0.57%
1964	6,836	−1.68%
1971	6,973	+0.28%
1981	6,433	−0.80%
1985	6,349	−0.33%
1989	6,193	−0.62%
1990	6,076	−1.89%
1991	5,956	−1.97%

Year	Pop.	±% p.a.
1992	5,916	−0.67%
1993	5,838	−1.32%
1994	5,736	−1.75%
1995	5,662	−1.29%
1996	5,586	−1.34%
1997	5,499	−1.56%
1998	5,435	−1.16%
1999	5,307	−2.36%
2000	5,185	−2.30%
2001	5,067	−2.28%
2002	4,957	−2.17%
2003	4,857	−2.02%
2004	4,768	−1.83%
2005	4,698	−1.47%
2006	4,581	−2.49%

Year	Pop.	±% p.a.
2007	4,485	−2.10%
2008	4,437	−1.07%
2009	4,334	−2.32%
2010	4,244	−2.08%
2011	4,128	−2.73%
2012	4,051	−1.87%
2013	3,969	−2.02%
2014	3,892	−1.94%
2015	3,856	−0.92%
2016	3,813	−1.12%
2017	3,745	−1.78%
2018	3,734	−0.29%
2019	3,671	−1.69%
2020	3,630	−1.12%

== Sites of interest ==
- Marienstern Abbey
- Castle
- Historic town centre of Mühlberg
- Museum dedicated to the battle that took place in 1547.

== Personalities ==
- Wilhelm Hasemann (1850-1913), Black Forest painter
- Werner Kube (1924-1945), resistance fighter, shot 1945 in Brottewitz
