= Karl Knortz =

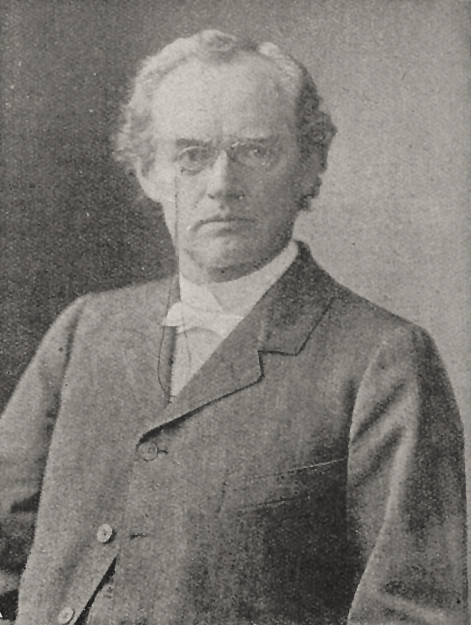
Karl Knortz (photo before 1911) in the weekend magazine Rhein und Düssel from August 26, 1911

Karl Knortz (28 August 1841 Garbenheim, Rhenish Prussia – 27 July 1918 North Tarrytown, New York) was a German-American author.

== Biography ==
He was educated at the gymnasium of Wetzlar, and the University of Heidelberg. He emigrated to the United States in 1863, where he engaged in teaching at Detroit 1864–1868, at Oshkosh, Wisconsin, 1868–1871, and at Cincinnati 1871–1874. He then edited a German daily newspaper at Indianapolis. After 1882, he resided in New York City, where he devoted himself to literature. From 1892 to 1905, he was superintendent of German schools in Evansville, Indiana. In 1905, he moved to North Tarrytown, New York.

Knortz did much to make American literature known and appreciated in Germany.

== Works ==
Besides translations of American poetry (Evangeline, Hiawatha, and The Courtship of Miles Standish by Henry Wadsworth Longfellow; Snow-Bound by John Greenleaf Whittier; and Leaves of Grass by Walt Whitman), he published:

- Märchen und Sagen der nordamerikanischen Indianer (Tales and legends of the North American Indians; Jena, 1871)
- Amerikanische Skizzen (American sketches; Halle, 1876)
- American Shakespeare Bibliography (Boston, 1876)
- Humoristische Gedichte (Humorous poems; Baltimore, 1877)
- Longfellow: Eine literarhistorische Studie (Longfellow: a literary study; Hamburg, 1879)
- Aus dem Wigwam (From the wigwam; Leipzig, 1880)
- Modern American Lyrics (1880)
- Kapital und Arbeit in Amerika (Capital and labor in America; Zurich, 1881)
- Aus der transatlantischen Gesellschaft (From the transatlantic community; Leipzig, 1882)
- Staat und Kirche in Amerika (State and church in America; Gotha, 1882)
- Shakespeare in Amerika (Berlin, 1882)
- Amerikanische Lebensbilder (Pictures of American life; Zurich, 1884)
- William F. C. Nindemann, Eines deutschen Matrosen Nordpolfahrten (A German sailor's journey to the North Pole; Zurich, 1885) Knortz edited this pamphlet by an arctic explorer.
- Representative German Poems, with translations (New York, 1885)
- Göthe und die Wertherzeit (Goethe and the Werther period; Zurich, 1885)
- Brook Farm und Margareth Fuller (New York, 1886)
- Gustav Seyffarth (1886)
- Geschichte der nordamerikanischen Litteratur (History of North American Literature; Berlin, 1891)
- Individuality (1897)
- Child Study (1899)
- Ein amerikanischer Diogenes (1898)
- Poetischer Hauschatz der Nordamerikaner (1902)
- Nackklänge germanischer Glaubers und Brauchs in Amerika (Echoes of Germanic Beliefs and Customs in America; 1903)
- Streifzüge auf dem Gebiete amerikanischer Volkskunde (Surveys in the area of American anthropology; 1903)
- Friedrich Nietzsche, der Unzeitgemässe (1909)
- Die Insekten in Sage, Brauch, und Literatur (Insects in legend, custom and literature; 1910)
- Walt Whitman und seine Nachfolger (Walt Whitman and his followers; 1910)
- Reptilien und Amphibien in Sitte, Sage, und Literatur (Reptiles and amphibians in custom, legend and literature; 1911)
- Teufel, Hexe, und Blocksbergspuk (Devils, witches and ghosts; 1913)
- Die Vögel im Sage, Sitte, und Literatur (Birds in custom, legend and literature; 1913)
- American Jews (1914)
- American Superstitions of Today (1913)
