= Finsterwalde =

- Town
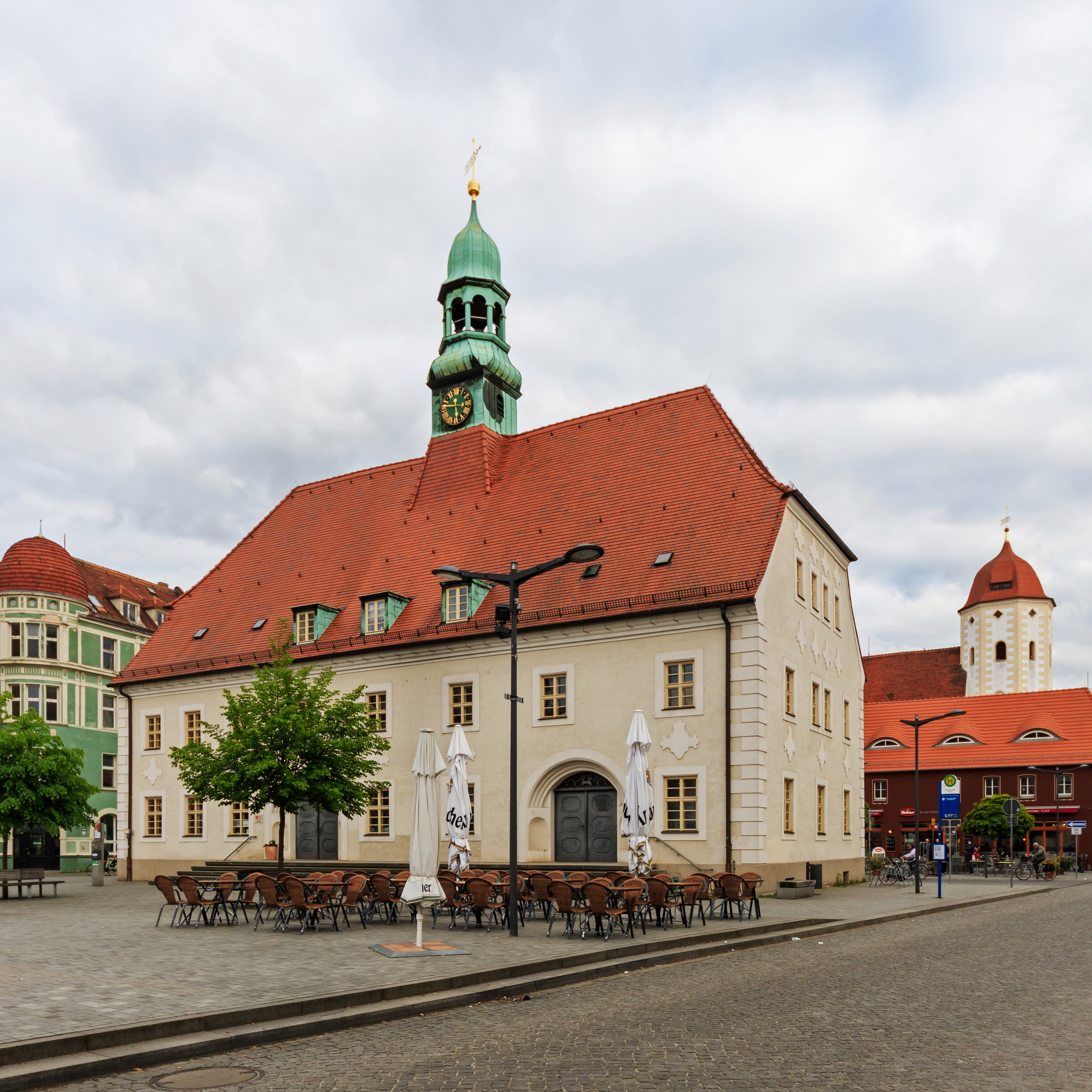
- Town hall

- Coat of arms

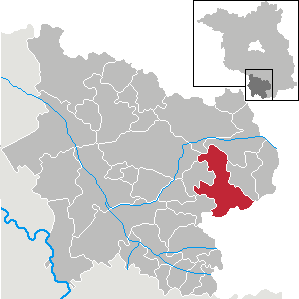
- Location of Finsterwalde within Elbe-Elster district
- Interactive map of Finsterwalde
- Location within Germany Location within Brandenburg
- Coordinates: 51°37′42″N 13°42′37″E
- Country: Germany
- State: Brandenburg
- District: Elbe-Elster
- Subdivisions: 3 Stadtteile / 2 Ortsteile

Government
  - Mayor (2017–25): Jörg Gampe (CDU)

Area
  - Total: 77.21 km^{2} (29.81 sq mi)
- Elevation: 108 m (354 ft)

Population (2025-12-31)
  - Total: 15,488
  - Density: 200.6/km^{2} (519.5/sq mi)
- Time zone: UTC+01:00 (CET)
  - Summer (DST): UTC+02:00 (CEST)
- Postal codes: 03238
- Dialling codes: 03531
- Vehicle registration: EE, FI, LIB
- Website: www.finsterwalde.de

Finsterwalde (German pronunciation: [fɪnstɐˈvaldə], Lower Sorbian: Grabin, pronounced [ˈɡrabʲin]) is a town in the Elbe-Elster district (German: Landkreis), in Lower Lusatia, Brandenburg, Germany.

== Overview ==
It is situated on the Schackebach, a tributary of the Kleine Elster, 28 m. W.S.W of Cottbus by rail. Pop. (2005) 18,840. The town has a Gothic church (1581), a castle, schools, cloth and cigar factories, iron-foundries, flour and saw mills and factories for machine building. Popular are the "four singers from Finsterwalde" and their "singer-song".

== History ==
Finsterwalde was first mentioned in 1288. Up until the beginning of 17th century, a large part of the city's population was still speaking Lower Sorbian. In 1635, Finsterwalde came into the possession of the Electorate of Saxony and from 1815 it became part of the Kingdom of Prussia. From 1815 to 1947, Finsterwalde was part of the Prussian Province of Brandenburg. From 1952 to 1990, it was part of the Bezirk Cottbus of East Germany.

== Demography ==
Development of population since 1875 within the current boundaries (Blue line: population; dotted line: Comparison to population development of Brandenburg state; grey background: Time of Nazi rule; red background: Time of communist rule)

Recent Population Development and Projections: Population Development before Census 2011 (blue line); Recent Population Development according to the Census in Germany in 2011 (blue bordered line); Official projections for 2005-2030 (yellow line); for 2020-2030 (green line); for 2017-2030 (scarlet line)

Finsterwalde: Population development
within the current boundaries

Year	Pop.	±% p.a.
1875	10,098	—
1890	11,466	+0.85%
1910	17,297	+2.08%
1925	17,474	+0.07%
1933	18,072	+0.42%
1939	20,120	+1.81%
1946	22,613	+1.68%
1950	22,374	−0.27%
1964	23,609	+0.38%
1971	23,976	+0.22%
1981	24,870	+0.37%
1985	24,781	−0.09%
1989	24,427	−0.36%
1990	23,777	−2.66%
1991	23,019	−3.19%

Year	Pop.	±% p.a.
1992	22,985	−0.15%
1993	22,556	−1.87%
1994	22,029	−2.34%
1995	21,744	−1.29%
1996	21,457	−1.32%
1997	21,343	−0.53%
1998	20,908	−2.04%
1999	20,482	−2.04%
2000	20,103	−1.85%
2001	19,704	−1.98%
2002	19,378	−1.65%
2003	19,152	−1.17%
2004	18,985	−0.87%
2005	18,693	−1.54%
2006	18,516	−0.95%

Year	Pop.	±% p.a.
2007	18,162	−1.91%
2008	17,861	−1.66%
2009	17,517	−1.93%
2010	17,407	−0.63%
2011	16,876	−3.05%
2012	16,680	−1.16%
2013	16,561	−0.71%
2014	16,407	−0.93%
2015	16,548	+0.86%
2016	16,497	−0.31%
2017	16,409	−0.53%
2018	16,220	−1.15%
2019	16,068	−0.94%
2020	15,968	−0.62%

== Known persons ==
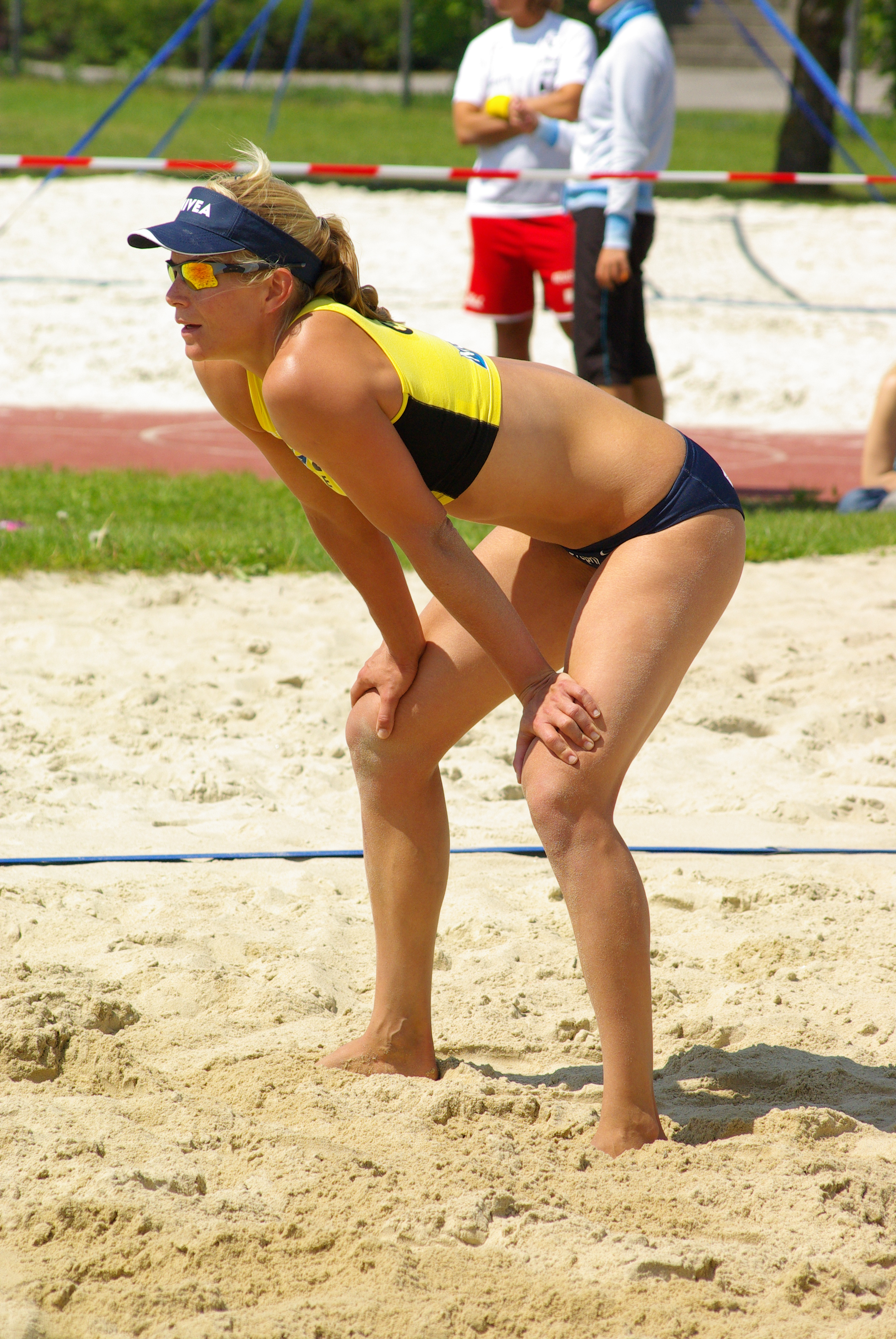
Beach volleyball player Stephanie Pohl.

The following well known persons are from Finsterwalde:

- Hansgeorg Bätcher (1914–2003), Oberstleutnant in the Luftwaffe
- Inge Deutschkron, (1922–2022), German-Israeli journalist and author
- Thomas Eisfeld, (born 1993), football player for Arsenal FC
- Rainer Genilke (born 1968), politician
- Catrin G Grosse (born 1964), artist and painter
- Kurt Haehling (1893–1983), Generalmajor in the Wehrmacht
- Detlef Irrgang, (born 1966), football player
- Sonja Kesselschläger, Heptathlon athlete
- Hermann Kotzschmar, (1829–1908), German-American musician, conductor and composer
- Peggy Kuznik, Football player
- Otto Ostrowski, (1883–1963), Mayor of Finsterwalde in the 1920s
- Stephanie Pohl, (born 1978), beach volleyball player
- Hans-Jürgen Riediger (born 1955), football player

== Buildings and Monuments ==
- Finsterwalde Solar Park
- Janusz-Korczak-Gymnasium, formerly Knabenschule by Max Taut (1913)
- In Finsterwalde is located a relief dedicated to Lenin in the park "Bürgerheide"

== Climate ==
Climate data for Doberlug-Kirchhain (Note: Doberlug-Kirchhain is located approximately 10 kilometres (6.2 mi) west of Finsterwalde.) (1991–2020)
Month	Jan	Feb	Mar	Apr	May	Jun	Jul	Aug	Sep	Oct	Nov	Dec	Year
Mean daily maximum °C (°F)	3.4 (38.1)	5.0 (41.0)	9.2 (48.6)	15.3 (59.5)	19.7 (67.5)	23.1 (73.6)	25.3 (77.5)	25.1 (77.2)	20.1 (68.2)	14.3 (57.7)	8.1 (46.6)	4.4 (39.9)	14.4 (57.9)
Daily mean °C (°F)	0.6 (33.1)	1.5 (34.7)	4.6 (40.3)	9.5 (49.1)	13.9 (57.0)	17.3 (63.1)	19.4 (66.9)	19.0 (66.2)	14.5 (58.1)	9.6 (49.3)	4.9 (40.8)	1.8 (35.2)	9.7 (49.5)
Mean daily minimum °C (°F)	−2.4 (27.7)	−2.0 (28.4)	0.3 (32.5)	3.3 (37.9)	7.5 (45.5)	11.0 (51.8)	13.2 (55.8)	12.8 (55.0)	9.2 (48.6)	5.4 (41.7)	1.7 (35.1)	−0.9 (30.4)	4.9 (40.8)
Average precipitation mm (inches)	45.7 (1.80)	34.0 (1.34)	38.8 (1.53)	27.9 (1.10)	57.2 (2.25)	53.4 (2.10)	69.4 (2.73)	61.2 (2.41)	45.8 (1.80)	39.4 (1.55)	43.3 (1.70)	44.1 (1.74)	561.6 (22.11)
Average precipitation days (≥ 0.1 mm)	17.1	13.7	15.1	11.0	13.1	12.9	14.0	12.7	11.8	13.8	15.0	16.4	166.8
Average relative humidity (%)	84.5	80.6	77.0	70.5	70.5	70.0	69.0	69.9	76.6	82.3	87.1	86.2	77.8
Mean monthly sunshine hours	55.2	78.0	124.7	190.8	224.2	218.7	228.4	220.4	163.7	114.1	62.2	48.3	1,741.3
Source: NOAA
