= Bad Liebenwerda =

- Town
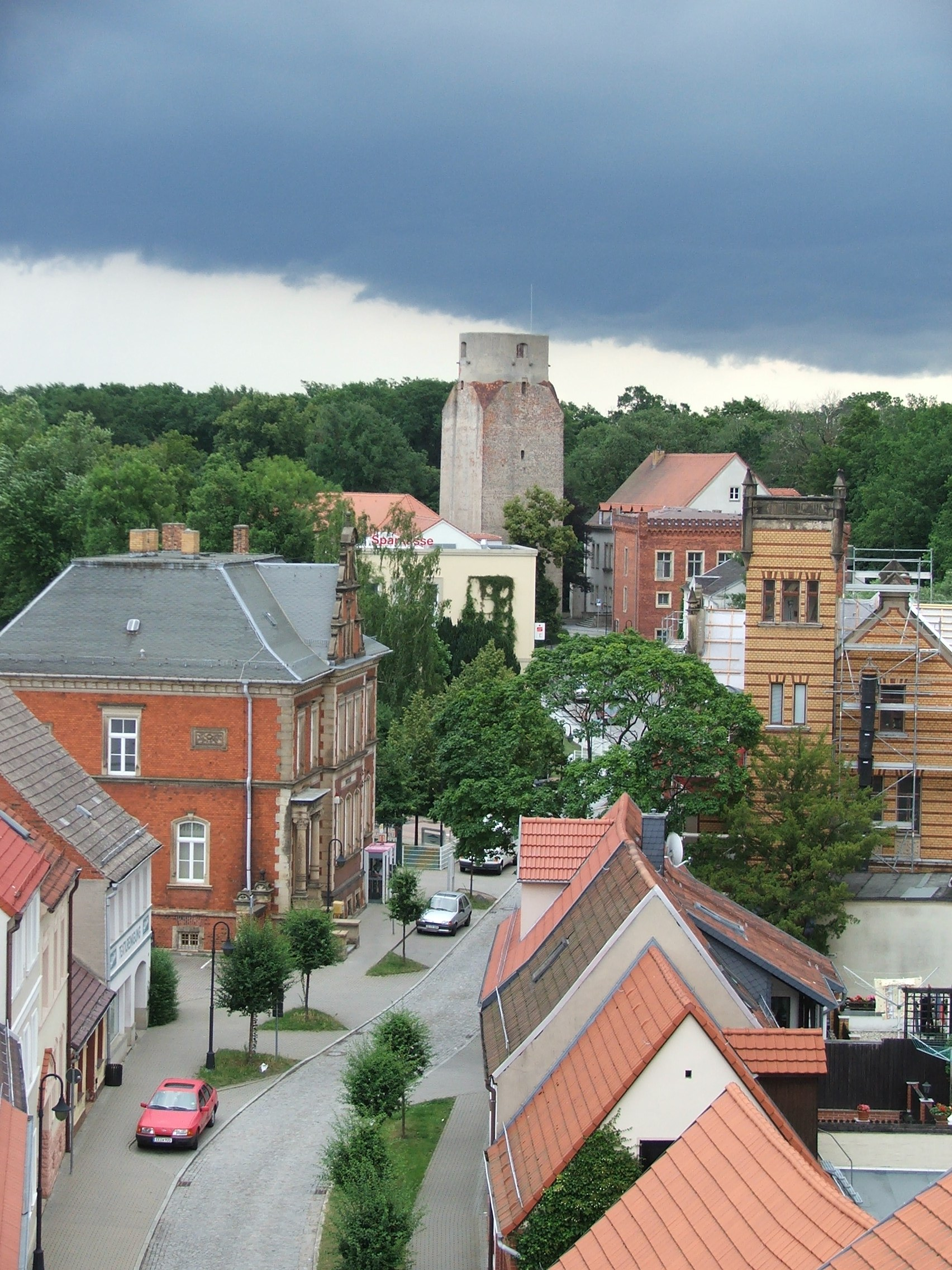
- The Lubwartturm, Bad Liebenwerda

- Coat of arms

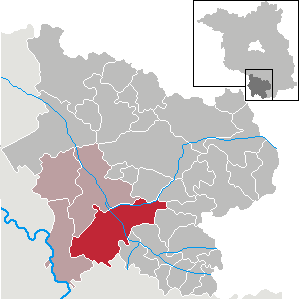
- Location of Bad Liebenwerda within Elbe-Elster district
- Interactive map of Bad Liebenwerda
- Location within Germany Location within Brandenburg
- Coordinates: 51°31′N 13°24′E
- Country: Germany
- State: Brandenburg
- District: Elbe-Elster
- Municipal assoc.: Liebenwerda

Government
  - Mayor (2020–25): Johannes Berger

Area
  - Total: 138.88 km^{2} (53.62 sq mi)
- Elevation: 86 m (282 ft)

Population (2025-12-31)
  - Total: 8,835
  - Density: 63.62/km^{2} (164.8/sq mi)
- Time zone: UTC+01:00 (CET)
  - Summer (DST): UTC+02:00 (CEST)
- Postal codes: 04924
- Dialling codes: 035341
- Vehicle registration: EE, FI, LIB
- Website: www.badliebenwerda.de

Bad Liebenwerda (German: [baːt ˌliːbm̩ˈvɛʁda]) is a spa town in the Elbe-Elster district, in southwestern Brandenburg, Germany. It is situated on the river Schwarze Elster, 57 km northwest of Dresden, and 28 km east of Torgau.

== History ==
The first written mention is from the Lievenwerde in 1231. The meaning of the name is Live, or Lieb for life or lovely, and -werde from werda meaning island, high place in water. The document mentions an Otto of Ileburg, Vogt of Lievenwerde, and Plebanus Walterus, a priest.

Liebenwerda has a moated castle with a keep known as the Lubwartturm. The first mention as Liebenwerda as a city is from 1304. Liebenwerda was part of the Electorate of Saxony and Kingdom of Saxony until 1815; as a result of the Congress of Vienna the area became a district in the Kingdom of Prussia. The town has had a health spa since 1905, and in 1925 the word Bad was prefixed to its name. From 1952 to 1990, Bad Liebenwerda was part of the Bezirk Cottbus of East Germany.

== Demography ==
Development of Population since 1875 within the Current Boundaries (Blue Line: Population; Dotted Line: Comparison to Population Development of Brandenburg state; Grey Background: Time of Nazi rule; Red Background: Time of Communist rule)

Recent Population Development and Projections (Population Development before Census 2011 (blue line); Recent Population Development according to the Census in Germany in 2011 (blue bordered line); Official projections for 2005-2030 (yellow line); for 2017-2030 (scarlet line)

Bad Liebenwerda: Population development
within the current boundaries (2017)

Year	Pop.	±% p.a.
1875	7,715	—
1890	8,058	+0.29%
1910	9,075	+0.60%
1925	9,943	+0.61%
1933	10,257	+0.39%
1939	11,012	+1.19%
1946	14,574	+4.08%
1950	14,459	−0.20%
1964	13,316	−0.59%
1971	13,548	+0.25%
1981	12,690	−0.65%
1985	12,445	−0.49%
1989	12,123	−0.65%
1990	11,937	−1.53%
1991	11,703	−1.96%

Year	Pop.	±% p.a.
1992	11,677	−0.22%
1993	11,733	+0.48%
1994	11,638	−0.81%
1995	11,649	+0.09%
1996	11,574	−0.64%
1997	11,590	+0.14%
1998	11,593	+0.03%
1999	11,483	−0.95%
2000	11,326	−1.37%
2001	11,231	−0.84%
2002	11,068	−1.45%
2003	10,981	−0.79%
2004	10,866	−1.05%
2005	10,720	−1.34%
2006	10,573	−1.37%

Year	Pop.	±% p.a.
2007	10,391	−1.72%
2008	10,236	−1.49%
2009	10,038	−1.93%
2010	9,973	−0.65%
2011	9,772	−2.02%
2012	9,634	−1.41%
2013	9,486	−1.54%
2014	9,411	−0.79%
2015	9,305	−1.13%
2016	9,283	−0.24%
2017	9,282	−0.01%
2018	9,188	−1.01%
2019	9,140	−0.52%
2020	9,224	+0.92%

== Culture and architecture ==
Bad Liebenwerda is home of the Gothic church of St. Nikolai. The tower of the church was rebuilt at the end of the 19th century after lightning struck the tower and caused a fire. The Lubwartturm, a tower was built around 1207 as part of the moated castle, is the oldest building in town. Next to this tower is the museum with an exhibition on the composer Carl Heinrich Graun and his brothers. Also is there an exhibition on Marionettes, other puppets and puppeteers of south-east Germany.

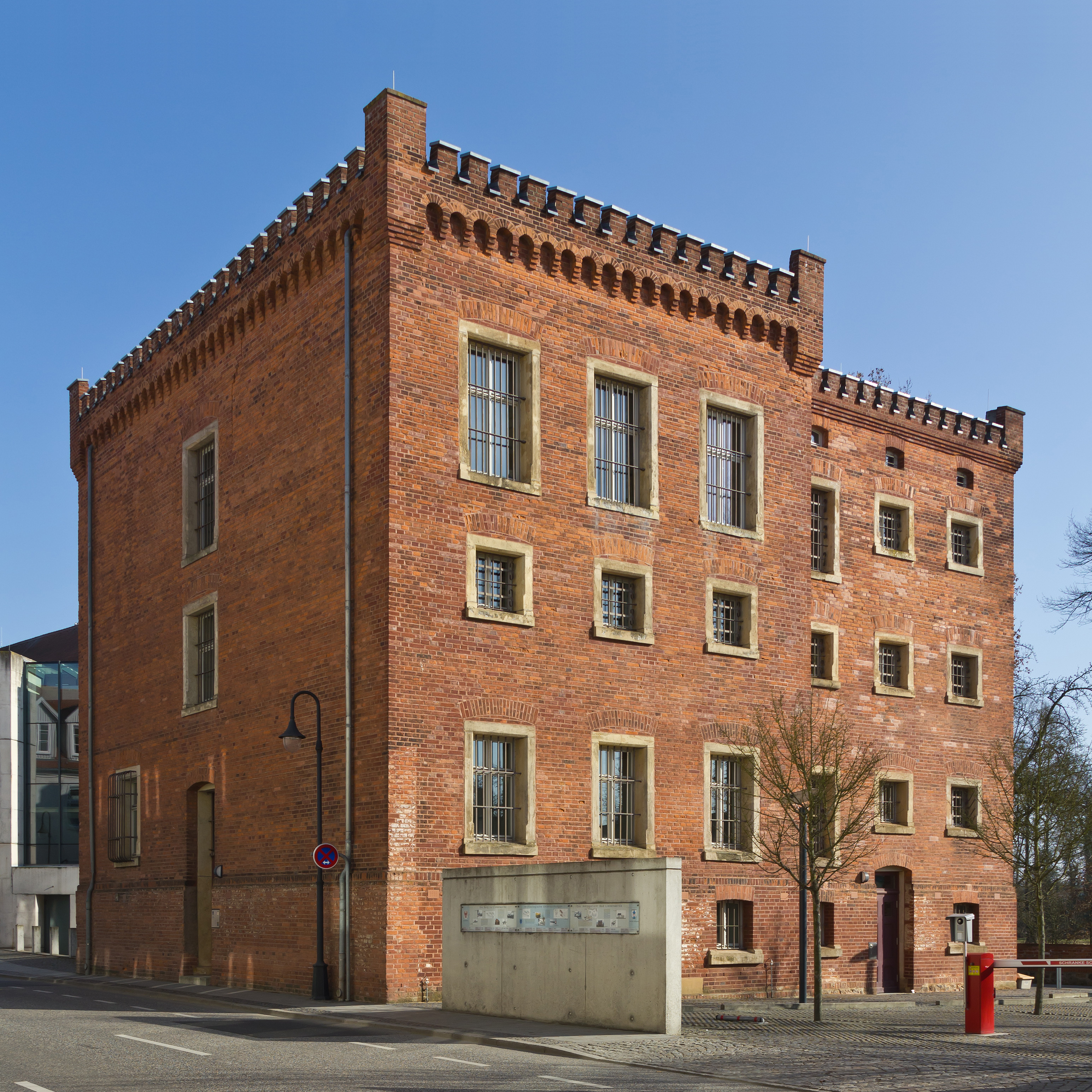
Bad Liebenwerda, former prison

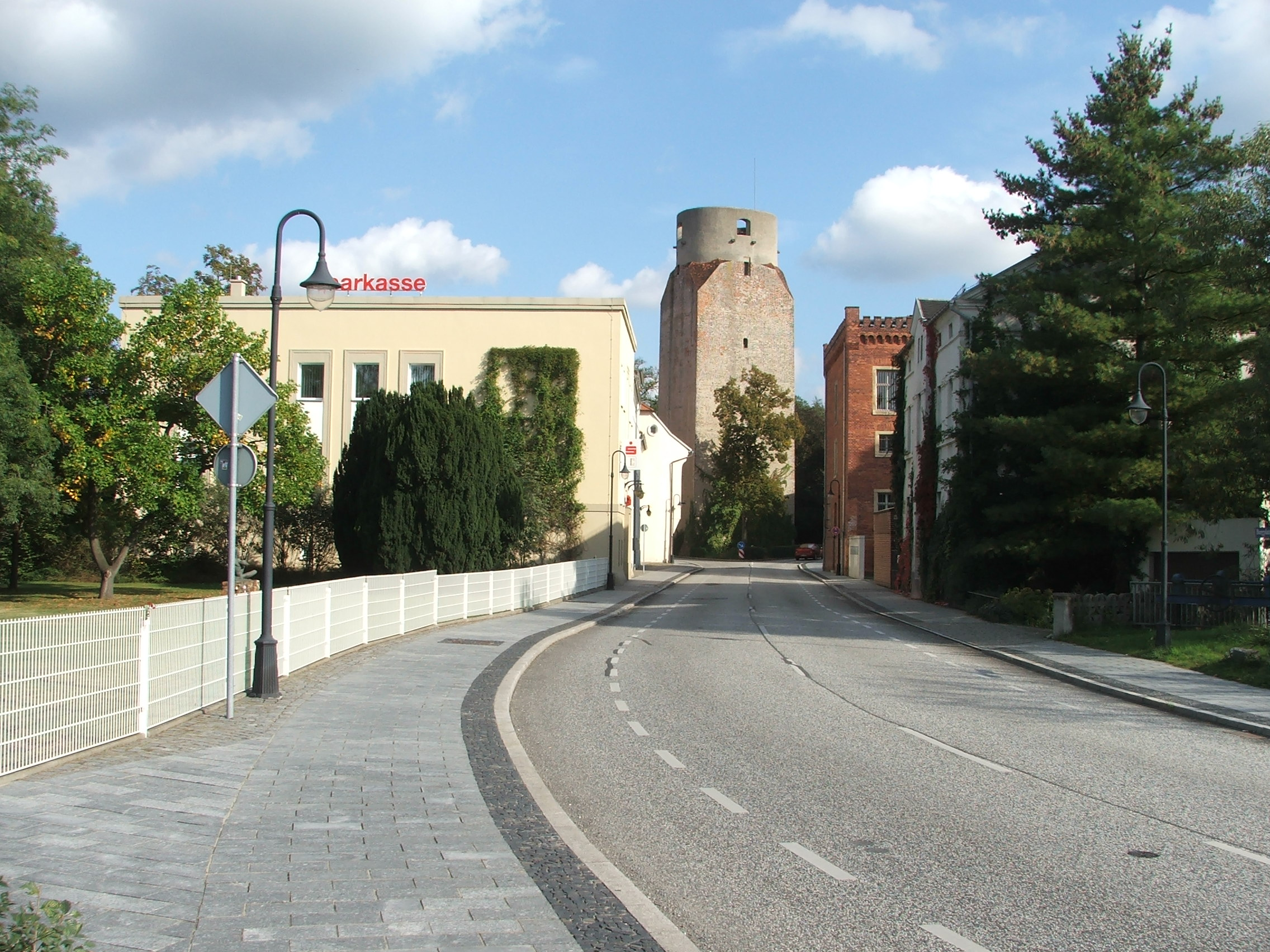
Bad Liebenwerda, Lubwart-Tower

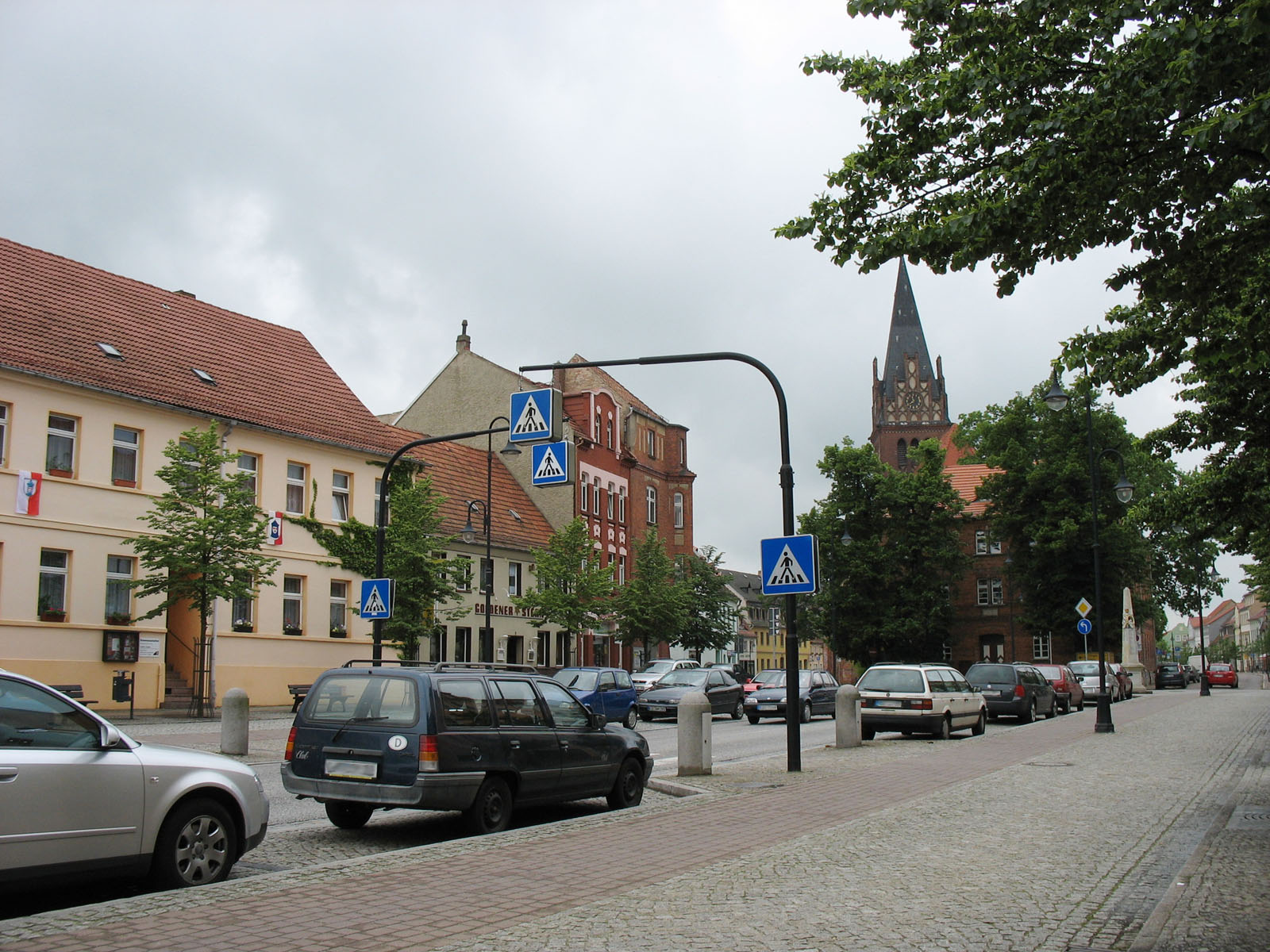
central square "Rossmarkt"

== Sons and daughters of the town ==
- Gotthard Fritzsche (1797-1863), theologian and founder of the Evangelical Lutheran Church in Australia
- Ernst Theodor Echtermeyer (1805-1844), philosopher and philologist
- Ernst Eberhard (1843-1909), popular science writer
- Erich Müller (1897-1980), writer
