= Rainer Genilke =

German politician (born 1968)

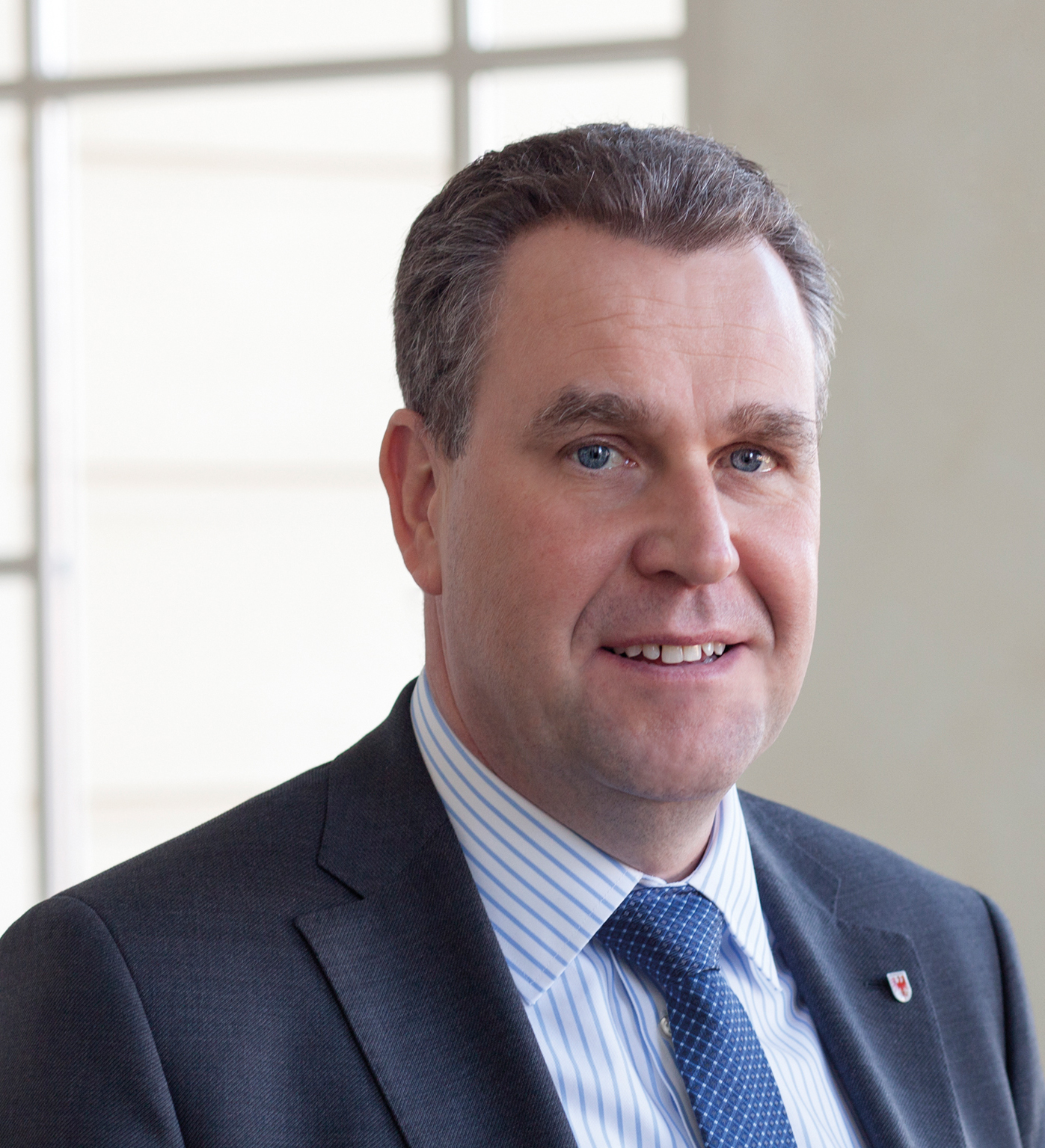
- Genilke in 2023

Minister of Infrastructure and Regional Planning of Brandenburg
- In office 22 November 2023 – 11 December 2024
- Minister-President: Dietmar Woidke
- Preceded by: Guido Beermann
- Succeeded by: Detlef Tabbert

Personal details
- Born: 1 March 1968 (age 58) Finsterwalde
- Party: Christian Democratic Union (since 1999)

Rainer Genilke (born 1 March 1968 in Finsterwalde) is a German politician. He has been a member of the Landtag of Brandenburg since 2024, having previously served from 2009 to 2019. From 2023 to 2024, he served as minister of infrastructure and regional planning of Brandenburg.
