= Ernst Theodor Echtermeyer =

German writer and philosopher

Ernst Theodor Echtermeyer (12 August 1805, Bad Liebenwerda – 6 May 1844, Dresden) was a German writer and philosopher. Together with Arnold Ruge, in 1838, he founded the Hallische Jahrbücher für Wissenschaft und Kunst, an organ of the Young Hegelians.
