= Gordon (given name) =

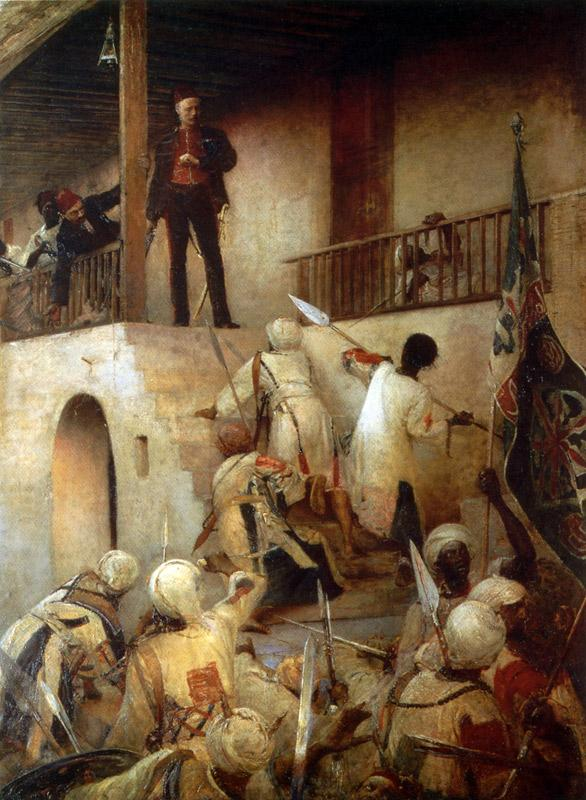
- Joy's romanticised depiction of Major-General Gordon's death in 1885.
- Pronunciation: /ˈɡɔːrdən/
- Gender: Masculine
- Language: English

Origin
- Language: Scots
- Origin: Gordon (surname)

Other names
- See also: Gòrdan

Gordon (/ˈɡɔːrdən/) is a masculine given name in the English language. The name is derived from the Scottish surname Gordon. It is uncertain if this surname originated from a place name in Scotland or in France. The Gordon in Berwickshire, where the family who bore the surname held lands in the 12th century, is of uncertain etymology. It is also possible that this place name was named after settlers from France, who were named after a like-named place in Normandy. The surname is thought to have been taken up as a given name in honour of the Major-General Charles George Gordon, a British army officer who was killed in 1885, in Khartoum.

== Origin of the name ==
The given name Gordon originates from a transferred use of the Scottish surname Gordon. The origin of this surname is debated. While it is considered to be derived from a place name, it is not certain that the place name of Gordon, in Berwickshire, Scotland, is the origin of the surname. Berwickshire was once the home of Clan Gordon, and the earliest member of the family on record is of Richer de Gordun, who was lord of the barony of Gordon, in the mid-12th century. This place name may be derived from the Brythonic gor, meaning "spacious"; and din or dun, meaning "fort" (Irish: dún, Scottish: dùn, Welsh: dun, din).

However, it is also possible that the Scottish surname originated from a place name in Normandy, France, and was brought over to Scotland, where it gave rise to the place name in Berwickshire. For example, the English surname Gordon is considered to be derived from Gourdon in Saône-et-Loire, France. Early records of this surname occur in England in the early 13th century (such as Adam de Gurdon, in 1204). This French place name is derived from the Gallo-Roman personal name Gordus and the locative suffix -o, -onis.

The given name is thought to have been used in honour of Major-General Charles George Gordon (1833–85), who was killed at Khartoum.

== Variants, cognates ==
The masculine given name can be represented in Scottish Gaelic as Gòrdan.

The diminutives Gord, Gordie or Jordie may also be used as a nickname.

== List of people ==
- Saint Gordon of Rome or Saint Gordianus (d. 362), Roman saint martyred under Julian the Apostate
- Gordon (slave) (fl. 1863), African-American slave and US Civil War soldier
- Gordon Abbott (1914–1986), Australian rules footballer
- Gordon Allport (1897–1967), American psychologist
- Gordon Anderson (disambiguation), several people
- Gordon Arnold, Canadian-American who claimed to have witnessed the assassination of United States President John F. Kennedy
- Gord Ash (b. 1951), assistant general manager for the Milwaukee Brewers
- Gordon Bajnai (b. 1968), Hungarian politician, ex-Prime Minister of Hungary
- Gordon Banks (1937–2019), English football player
- Gordon Bell (b. 1934), American computer engineer
- Gordon Bowman (1927–2013), Australian rules footballer
- Gordon Brown (b. 1951), Scottish politician, the former Prime Minister of the United Kingdom
- Gordon Burgess (1918–2000), New Zealand cricket player and administrator
- Gordon Burns (b. 1942), Northern Irish television presenter
- Gordon Campbell (disambiguation), multiple people
- Gordon Chambers (born c. 1969), American singer-songwriter
- Vere Gordon Childe (1892–1957), Australian archaeologist
- Gordon Church (1960–1988), American gay murder victim
- Gordon Luke Clarke (b. 1945), New Zealand-born 1970s fashion designer
- Gordon Stanley "Mickey" Cochrane (1903–1962), American baseball player
- Gordon Cooper (1927–2004), American astronaut
- Gordon Cummins 1914–1942), British serial killer
- Gordon R. Dickson (1923–2001), American science fiction author
- Gordon Downie (1964–2017), Canadian singer/songwriter, lead singer of the Canadian band The Tragically Hip
- Gordon Frickers (b. 1949), English marine, aviation and landscape artist
- Gordon Gano (b. 1963), American singer/songwriter/guitarist, lead singer of Wisconsin proto-alternative group The Violent Femmes
- Gordon Getty (b. 1933), American businessman and classical music composer, son of oil tycoon J. Paul Getty
- Gordon Giltrap (b. 1948), English guitarist
- Gordon Goodwin (1954–2025), American jazz pianist, saxophonist, composer, arranger and conductor
- Gordon Gore (1913–1987), American football player
- Gordon Grant (1949–1993), American actor and model
- Gordon Gould (1920–2005), American physicist
- Gordon Harris (disambiguation), multiple people
- Gordon Hay, Scottish author and translator
- Gordon Hayward (b. 1990), American basketball player
- Gordon Hayward (cricketer) (1926–2014), English cricketer
- Gordon Heuckeroth (b. 1968), Dutch singer and radio and television presenter, under the name Gordon
- Gordon Hill (politician) (born 1951), Australian politician
- Gordon B. Hinckley (1910–2008), American, 15th president of The Church of Jesus Christ of Latter-day Saints
- Gordon Hookey (b. 1961), Australian aboriginal artist
- Gordon Howe (1928–2016), Canadian hockey player
- Gordon Ian (1930–2006), English racing cyclist
- Gordon Ingate (1926–2026), Australian sailor
- Gord Johns (b. 1969), politician from British Columbia, Canada
- Gordie Johnson (b. 1964), Canadian musician
- Gord Kluzak (b. 1964), Canadian NHL defenceman for the Boston Bruins
- Gordon Korman (b. 1963), Canadian-American children's book author
- G. Gordon Liddy (1930–2021), American, jointly organized break-in of the Democratic National Committee headquarters in the Watergate scandal
- Gordon Lightfoot (1938–2023), Canadian singer-songwriter
- Gordon Lish (b. 1934), American writer
- Gordon Lonsdale (1922–1970), Russian spy
- Gordon Lunan (1914–2005), Canadian spy for the Soviet Union
- Gord Mackintosh (b. 1955), politician in Manitoba, Canada
- Gord Martineau (b. 1947), Canadian television journalist
- Gordon Matta-Clark (1943–1978), American artist
- Gordon W. McKay (1910–1990), American businessman and politician
- Gordon McRae (b. 1948), Canadian professional hockey player, retired
- Gordon MacRae (1921–1986), American actor and singer
- Gordon McLendon, American radio broadcaster
- Gord Miller (sportscaster) (b. 1965), Canadian sportscaster for the cable network TSN
- Gord Miller (politician) (1924–2021), former politician in Ontario, Canada
- Gord Miller (environmental commissioner) (b. 1953), the current Environmental Commissioner of Ontario, Canada
- Gordon Moakes, English musician, member of Bloc Party
- Gordon Moore (1929–2023), American businessman
- Gordon Murray (b. 1946), South African designer of Formula One race cars
- Gordon S. Murray (1950–2011), American investment banker and writer
- Gordon Orlikow (b. 1960), Canadian decathlon, heptathlon, and hurdles competitor, Athletics Canada Chairman, Canadian Olympic Committee member, Korn/Ferry International partner
- Gordon Owen (b. 1959), English footballer
- Gordon Parks (1912–2006), American photographer and film director
- Gordon Pask (1928–1996), English cybernetician and psychologist
- Gord Perks (b. 1963), Canadian environmentalist, political activist, and writer
- Gordon Pinsent (1930–2023), Canadian actor
- Gordon Ramsay (b. 1966), British celebrity chef
- Gordon Raphael, American record producer and musician
- Gordon Rohlehr (1942–2023), Guyana-born scholar of West Indian literature
- Gordon Rosenmeier (1907–1989), American politician and lawyer
- Gordon Sanderson (1950–1977), Canadian murder victim
- Gordon Schildenfeld (b. 1985), Croatian footballer
- Gordon Schnieder (b. 1975), German politician
- Gordon Scott (1926–2007), American actor primarily known for playing Tarzan in theatrical films of mid- to late-1950s
- Gordon Shattock (1928–2010), British veterinarian, Conservative politician and survivor of the Brighton hotel bombing
- Gord Sinclair, Canadian bass guitarist, The Tragically Hip
- Gordon Singer (born 1973/1974), American hedge fund manager
- Gordon Slethaug, American professor of English
- Gordon Smiley (1946–1982), American race car driver
- Gordon Smith (disambiguation), multiple people
- Gord Spence (1897–1984), Canadian ice hockey player
- Gordon Charles Steele (1892–1981), English Royal Navy officer, VC recipient
- Gordon Strachan (b. 1957), Scottish football player and manager
- Gordon Stretton (1887–1983), British-Argentinean composer and musician
- Gordon Sumner (b. 1951), English performing artist known as Sting
- Gordon Tarpley (b. 1976), American musician
- Gordon Thomson (disambiguation), multiple people
- Gordon Tietjens (b. 1955), New Zealand rugby coach
- Gordon Towers (1919–1999), Canadian politician
- Gordon Walker (disambiguation), multiple people
- Gordon Waller (1945–2009), Scottish singer-songwriter and guitarist, one half of the duo Peter and Gordon
- R. Gordon Wasson (1898–1986), American psychedelic writer
- Gordon Watkins (1907–1974), American football player
- Gordon Williams (disambiguation), multiple people
- Gordon Wood (disambiguation), multiple people
- Gordon S. Wood (1933–2026), American historian

=== Other name ===
- Paul Gordon Georges (1923–2002), American painter
- Paul-Gordon Chandler (born 1964), American musician, composer and producer

== Fictional characters ==
- Gordon the Big Engine, from The Railway Series and Thomas and Friends
- Gordon Bombay, from The Mighty Ducks
- Gordon Collins (Brookside), fictional character from British soap opera Brookside
- Gordon the Gopher, puppet character from various British children's TV programmes
- Gordon Freeman, the main protagonist of Half-Life
- Gordon Gekko, protagonist of Wall Street
- Gordon Quid, character from Catscratch
- Gordon Robinson (Sesame Street), from the children's educational television program Sesame Street
- Gordon Shumway, the extraterrestrial lead in the U.S. sitcom ALF
- Gordon Tracy, fictional character from Thunderbirds
- Gordon Walker, hunter in the television series Supernatural
- Gordon, the English name of the main character "Godínez" from the animated television series El Chavo Animado.
- Gordon "Gordo" Stevens, an astronaut from the television series For All Mankind

== See also ==
- Gorden
