= Gordon =

Gordon may refer to:

== People ==
- Gordon (given name), a masculine given name, including list of persons and fictional characters
- Gordon (surname)
- Gordon (slave), escaped to a Union Army camp during the U.S. Civil War
- Gordon Heuckeroth (born 1968), Dutch performer and radio and television personality, known professionally by the mononym Gordon
- Clan Gordon, a Scottish clan

== Education ==
- Gordon State College, a public college in Barnesville, Georgia
- Gordon College (Massachusetts), a Christian college in Wenham, Massachusetts
- Gordon College (Pakistan), a Christian college in Rawalpindi, Pakistan
- Gordon College (Philippines), a public university in Subic, Zambales
- Gordon College of Education, a public college in Haifa, Israel

== Places ==
=== Australia ===
- Gordon, Australian Capital Territory
- Gordon, New South Wales
- Gordon, South Australia
- Gordon, Victoria
- Gordon River, Tasmania
- Gordon River (Western Australia)

=== Canada ===
- Gordon Parish, New Brunswick
- Gordon, Ontario, former municipality, now part of Gordon/Barrie Island
- Gordon River (Chochocouane River), a river in Quebec

=== Scotland ===
- Gordon (district), Aberdeenshire, forming a local government district from 1975 to 1996
- Gordon, Scottish Borders, Berwickshire (now the Scottish Borders council area)
- Gordon (Scottish Parliament constituency), Scotland (covering the Aberdeenshire area)
- Gordon (UK Parliament constituency), Scotland (covering the Aberdeenshire area)
- Gordon Castle, Moray

=== United States ===
- Gordon, Alabama
- Gordon, Alaska
- Gordon, Florida
- Gordon, Georgia, in Wilkinson County
- Gordon County, Georgia
- Gordon, Illinois
- Gordon, Kansas
- Gordon, Kentucky
- Gordon Township, Minnesota
- Gordon, Nebraska
- Gordon Heights, New York
- Gordon, Ohio
- Gordon, Pennsylvania
- Gordon, Texas
- Gordon, Ashland County, Wisconsin
- Gordon, Douglas County, Wisconsin
  - Gordon (CDP), Wisconsin, census-designated place in Douglas County

== Motor manufacturers ==
- Gordon (1903–1904) (Gordon Cycle & Motor Company Ltd), British manufacturer of bicycles and motor cars on Seven Sisters Road, London
- Gordon Newey, Newey, Newey-Aster, Gordon Newey Ltd, G.N.L. (GNL), (1907–1920), British automobile manufacturer from Birmingham
- Gordon (1912–1916), Gordon Armstrong, British cyclecar produced in Beverley Yorkshire by 'East-Riding Engineering'
- Gordon England (coachbuilder) 1920s coachbuilding and racing car manufacturer owned by Eric Gordon England
- Gordon (1954–1958) (Vernon Industries), British three wheeled motorcar built at Bidston, Cheshire
- Gordon GT (1959), a car model made by Gordon-Keeble
- Gordon-Keeble (1960–1961; 1964–1967), British car marque, made first in Slough, then Eastleigh, and finally in Southampton

== Transportation ==
- Gordon railway station, Sydney, on the North Shore line
- Gordon railway station, Victoria, on the Melbourne - Ballarat line
- LMR 600 Gordon, a British preserved locomotive

== Other uses ==
- Gordon (album), first album by the Canadian pop band Barenaked Ladies
- Duke of Gordon, British title
- Fairey Gordon, British light bomber of the 1930s and 1940s
- Gordon Castle, in Scotland
- Gordon Highlanders, infantry regiment
- Gordon's Gin, established 1769
- Gordon model, stock valuation model by Myron Gordon
- Gordon Letterpress (1821–1878), common model of open-platten printing press invented by George Phineas Gordon
- Gordon RFC, Sydney rugby union club
- Gordon Riots, in 18th-century Britain
- "Gordons" (Orange Is the New Black), a 2018 television episode
- Tropical Storm Gordon, name of several Atlantic hurricanes

== See also ==
- Gordan, variant of the name Gordon
- Gorden, variant of the name Gordon
- Gordón (disambiguation)
- Gordonia (disambiguation), derivative of Gordon
- Justice Gordon (disambiguation)
- Aaron Gordon (disambiguation)
