= Geotope =

Geological features of a landscape ecotope

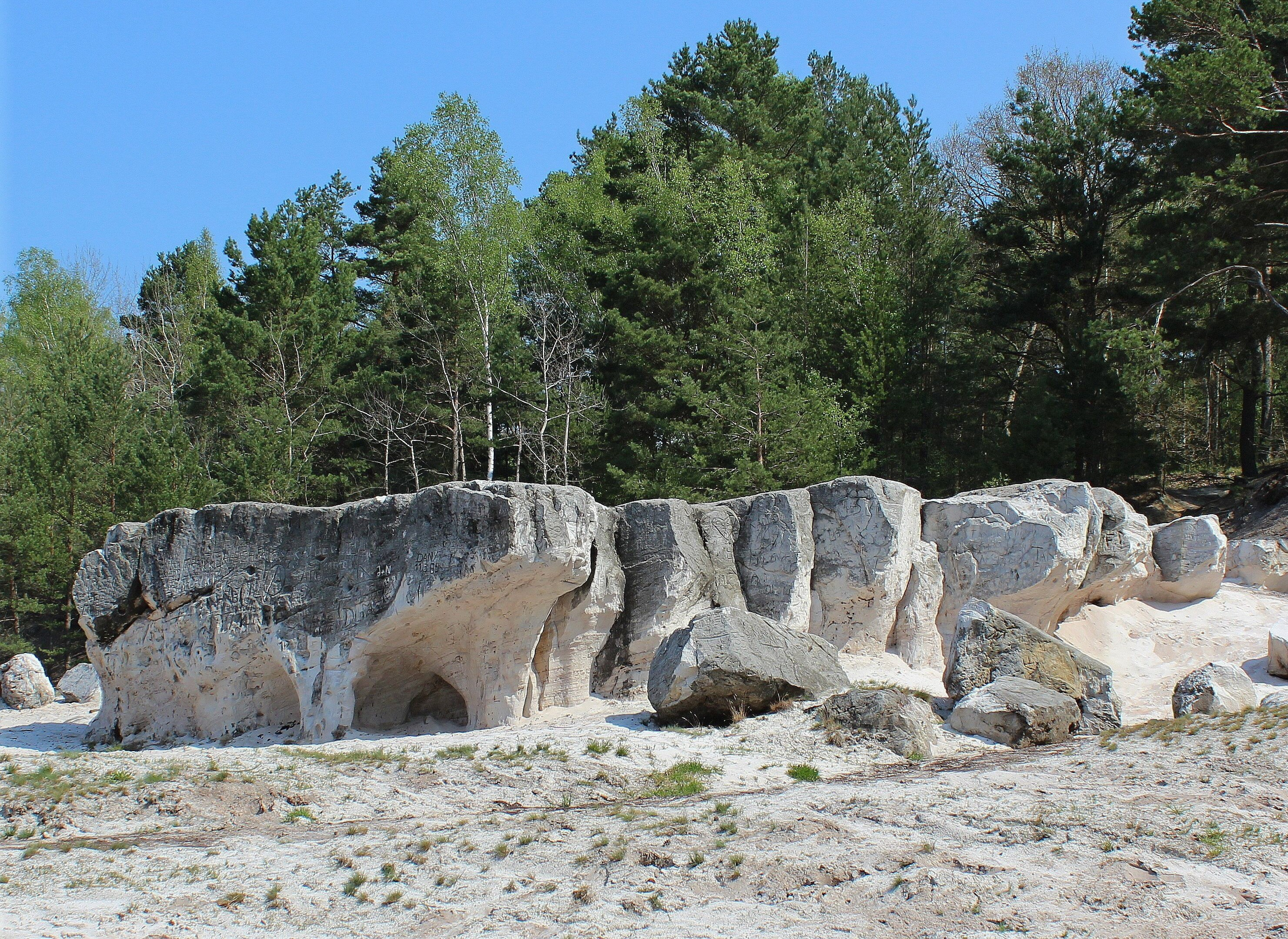
Petrified Miocene quartz sand in the old Grube Gotthold mine on the Liebenwerda Heath, Lower Lusatia

A geotope is the geological component of the abiotic matrix present in an ecotope. Example geotopes might be an exposed outcrop of rocks, an erratic boulder, a grotto or ravine, a cave, an old stone wall marking a property boundary, and so forth.

It is a loanword from German (Geotop) in the study of ecology and might be the model for many other similar words coined by analogy. As the prototype, it has enjoyed wider currency than many of the other words modelled on it, including physiotope, with which it is used synonymously. But the geotope is properly the rocks and not the whole lay of the land (which would be the physiotope).

For usage in the context of geoheritage, like e.g. in Friedrich Wiedenbein's contributions (see below) and in the German discussion on geoheritage, the more adequate term (and translation from the German) is geosite.

== See also ==
- Ecological land classification
