= Gordon Smith =

Gordon Smith may refer to:

== In politics ==
- Gordon H. Smith (born 1952), former U.S. senator from Oregon, and current area authority for the LDS Church
- Gordon Elsworth Smith (1918–2005), Canadian politician
- Gordon Smith (academic) (1927–2009), pioneer in the study of comparative European politics

== In sports ==
- Gordon Smith (American football) (born 1939), tight end with the NFL's Minnesota Vikings during the 1960s
- Gordon Smith (cricketer) (born 1949), Scottish cricketer and educator
- Gordon Smith (footballer, born 1924) (1924–2004), Scottish footballer, played for Hibernian, Heart of Midlothian, Dundee and Scotland
- Gordon Smith (footballer, born July 1954) (1954–2014), Scottish footballer, played for St. Johnstone and Aston Villa
- Gordon Smith (footballer, born December 1954), Scottish footballer (Rangers and Brighton & Hove Albion), former SFA chief executive
- Gordon Smith (footballer, born 1991), Scottish footballer, currently with Raith Rovers, son of Gordon Smith (footballer born 1959)
- Gordon Smith (ice hockey) (1908–1999), American Olympic ice hockey player
- Gordon Smith (New Zealand footballer), New Zealand international football (soccer) player
- Gordon Smith (rugby league), New Zealand former professional rugby league footballer
- Gordon Smith (wrestler) (born 1954), Australian wrestler
- Gord Smith (ice hockey) (born 1949), Canadian ice hockey player

== In the arts ==
- Gordon Smith (screenwriter), American television screenwriter
- Gordon W. Smith (1920–2010), artist and collector of American Indian art
- Gordon A. Smith (1919–2020), Canadian painter and sculptor who was born in England
- Gord Smith (sculptor) (1937–2023), Canadian sculptor
- W. Gordon Smith (1928–1996), Scottish playwright, author, critic, lyricist and television producer

== Other people ==
- Gordon V. Smith (1906–1997), Episcopal bishop in the U.S.
- Gordon Smith (inventor) (1950–2006), machinist and inventor of the KISS diving rebreather
- Gordon Smith (philatelist) (1856–1905), English lawyer and philatelist
- Gordon Smith (psychic medium) (born 1962), Scottish psychic medium
- Gordon Smith (British Army officer) (1920–2014), Scottish WWII soldier and Japanese prisoner-of-war
- D. Gordon Smith (born 1962), dean of the J. Reuben Clark Law School
- Ches Smith (Gordon Smith), musician and percussionist
- Gordon C. S. Smith (born 1965), British academic and professor of obstetrics and gynaecology

== See also ==
- Gordon Smith Guitars, a British manufacturer of electric guitars
