= The Thing-Ummy Bob =

1942 song

"It's a ticklish sort of job making a thing for a thing-ummy-bob,
Especially when you don't know what it's for.
But it's the girl that makes the thing that drills the hole that holds the ring
That makes the thing-ummy-bob that makes the engines roar.
And it's the girl that makes the thing that holds the oil that oils the ring
That makes the thing-ummy-bob that's going to win the war.
It is 'n all."

— "The Thing-ummy-Bob", a British song made popular by Gracie Fields

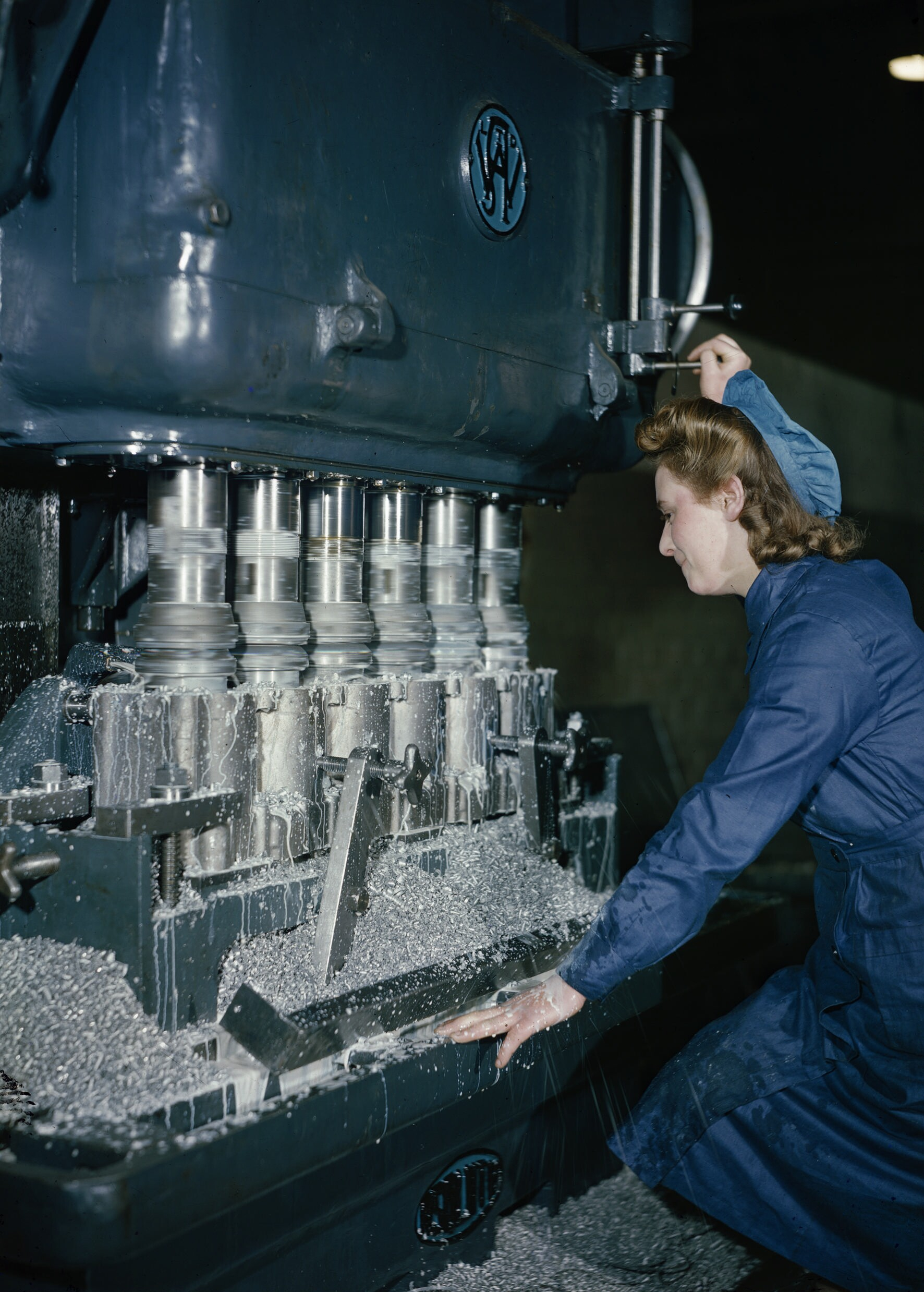
A woman machining an engine block on the home front during World War II.

"The Thing-ummy-Bob [That's Going To Win The War]" is a 1942 song, written by Gordon Thompson with music by David Heneker, which celebrates the female production-line workers of World War II making components for complex weapons to win the war. Its chorus is

I'm the girl that makes the thing
That drills the hole that holds the ring
That drives the rod that turns the knob
That works the thing-ummy-bob

A thingumabob or thingummy is an extended form of the word thing which the Oxford English Dictionary records being used as far back as 1751.

The song was popularized by performers Arthur Askey and Gracie Fields.

== See also ==
- This Is the House That Jack Built
- Total war
- Willful blindness
