= Gordon Harris =

Gordon Harris may refer to:

- Gordon Harris (footballer, born 1940) (1940–2014), English footballer
- Gordon Harris (footballer, born 1945), Scottish footballer
- Gordon Harris (actor) (1918–1965), English actor
- Gordon Harris (urban planner), Canadian urban planner
- Gordon Harris (Australian cricketer) (1897–1974), Australian cricketer
- Gordon Harris (English cricketer) (born 1964), former English cricketer
- Gordon Harris (Canadian politician)
