= Gordon Thompson =

Gordon Thompson may refer to:

- Gordon V. Thompson (1888–1965), Canadian composer
- Gordon Thompson Jr. (1929–2015), U.S. federal judge
- Gordon R. Thompson (1918–1995), Chief Justice of the Supreme Court of Nevada

== See also ==
- Gordon Thomson (disambiguation)
