= Gordon Murray (disambiguation) =

Gordon Murray is a South African car designer.

Gordon Murray may also refer to:

- Gordon Murray (politician) (1927–2015), Scottish nationalist politician
- Gordon Murray (puppeteer) (1921–2016), British television producer and puppeteer
- K. Gordon Murray (1922–1979), American film producer
- Donald Walter Gordon Murray (1894–1976), a.k.a. Gordon Murray, Canadian surgeon
- Gordon Murray, Scottish architect, see Gordon Murray & Alan Dunlop Architects
- Gordon S. Murray, co-author of The Investment Answer
