= Max Lynar Louden =

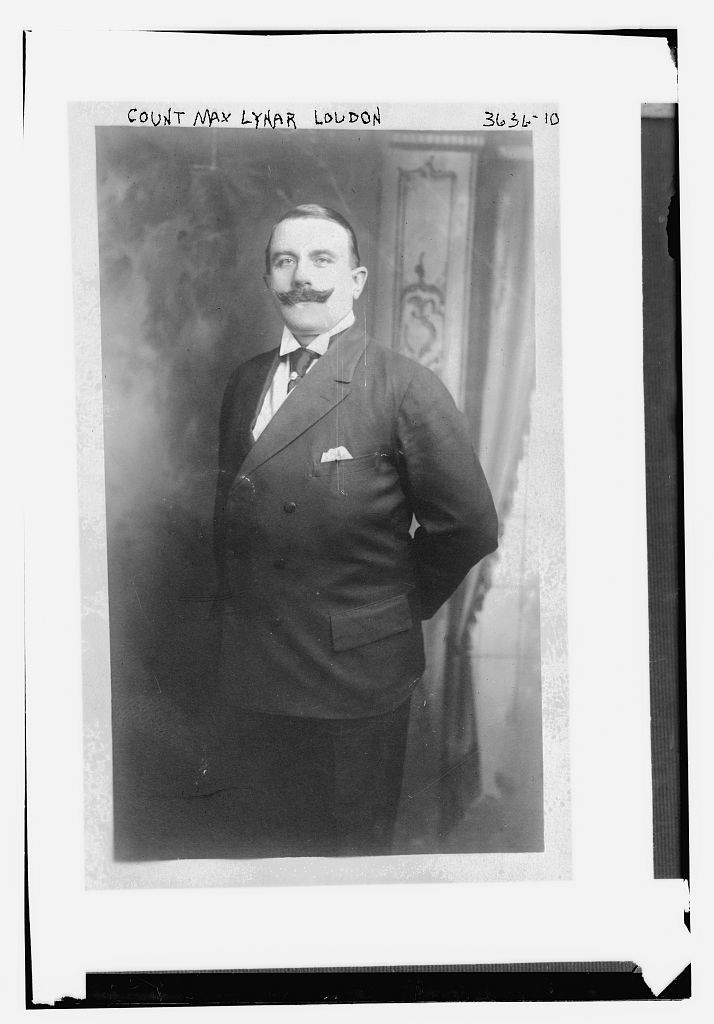
Max Lynar Louden circa 1915

Friedrich August Albert Max Schiemangk (31 August 1869 – ), known as Max Lynar Louden among other aliases, was a German confidence man, bigamist, and a spy during World War I.

== Biography ==
Louden was born in 1869 in Staupitz, North German Confederation. He studied at a military academy but never graduated. He then migrated to the United States in 1890. He at first passed himself off as Max de Chimang in Poughkeepsie, New York where he organized a Schützenbund and fled with the money he collected from a charity event. On August 29, 1911, he got his license to marry Lalia Florence Allendorf.

In 1916, Louden was convicted of bigamy and sentenced to six months to three years at Sing Sing Prison. Following his release in 1919, he was charged with attempted forgery. Louden pleaded guilty and was sentenced to another 3 years in prison.

== Aliases ==
- Count Jean Marcel Peyrgne de Passy
- Count Albert Marcel de Passy
- Count Rocher M. zu Lynar
- Count Max Lynar Louden
- Count De Passy
- Max de Chimang
