= Bertzit Tower =

Industrial ruin in Germany

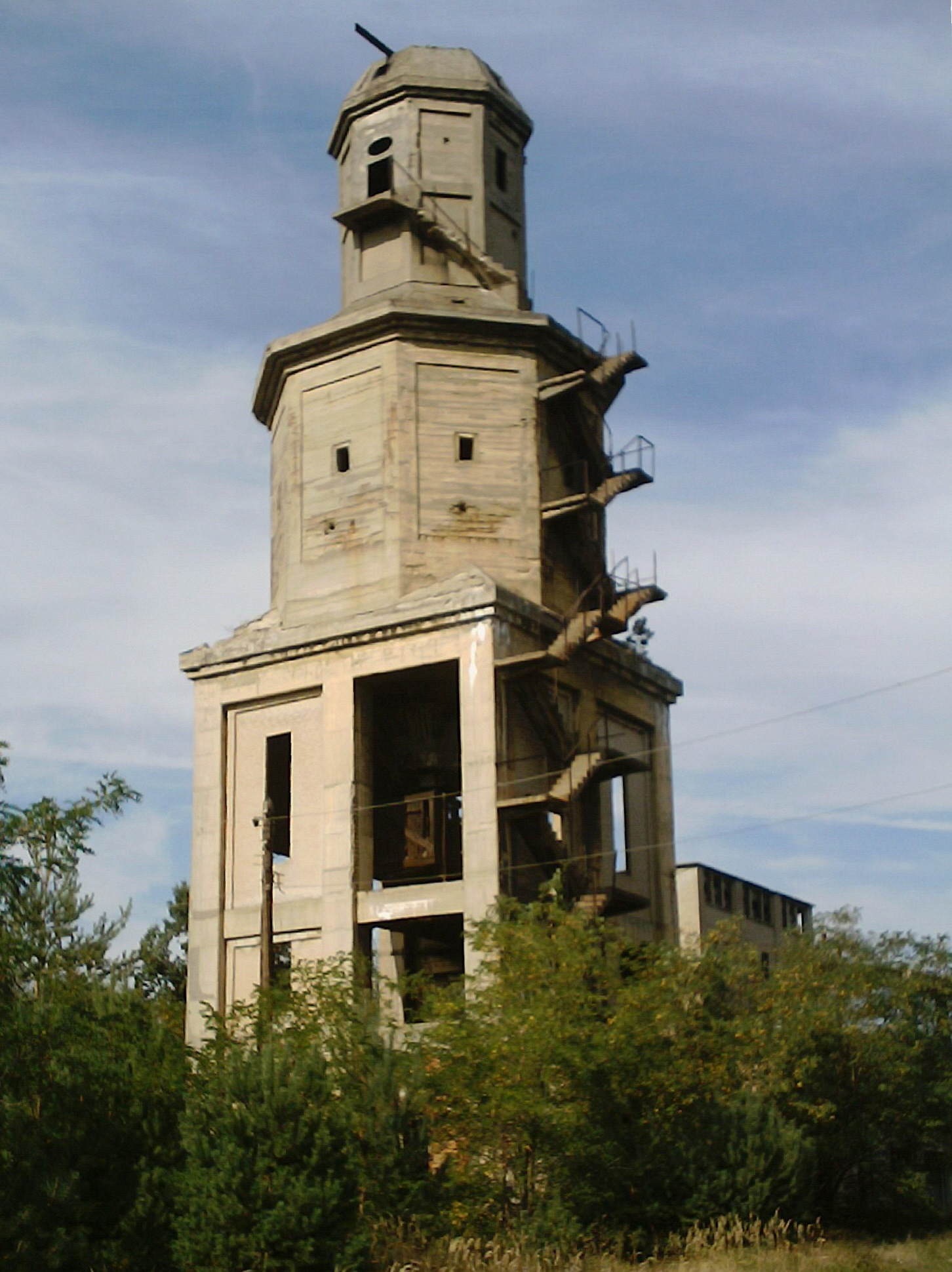
Bertzit Tower

Bertzit Tower is an investment ruin in the north of Kahla, which belongs to Plessa in the southern part of Brandenburg, itself part of the Elbe-Elster region.

The tower was built in the 1920s in close proximity to mine Ada, intended to be used in the processing of brown coal. The remains of the plant now stand under conservation, along with other industrial buildings from the nearby brown coal mine. The 35-meter high industrial monument is visible from afar in the lowlands of the Schwarze Elster area.

== History ==
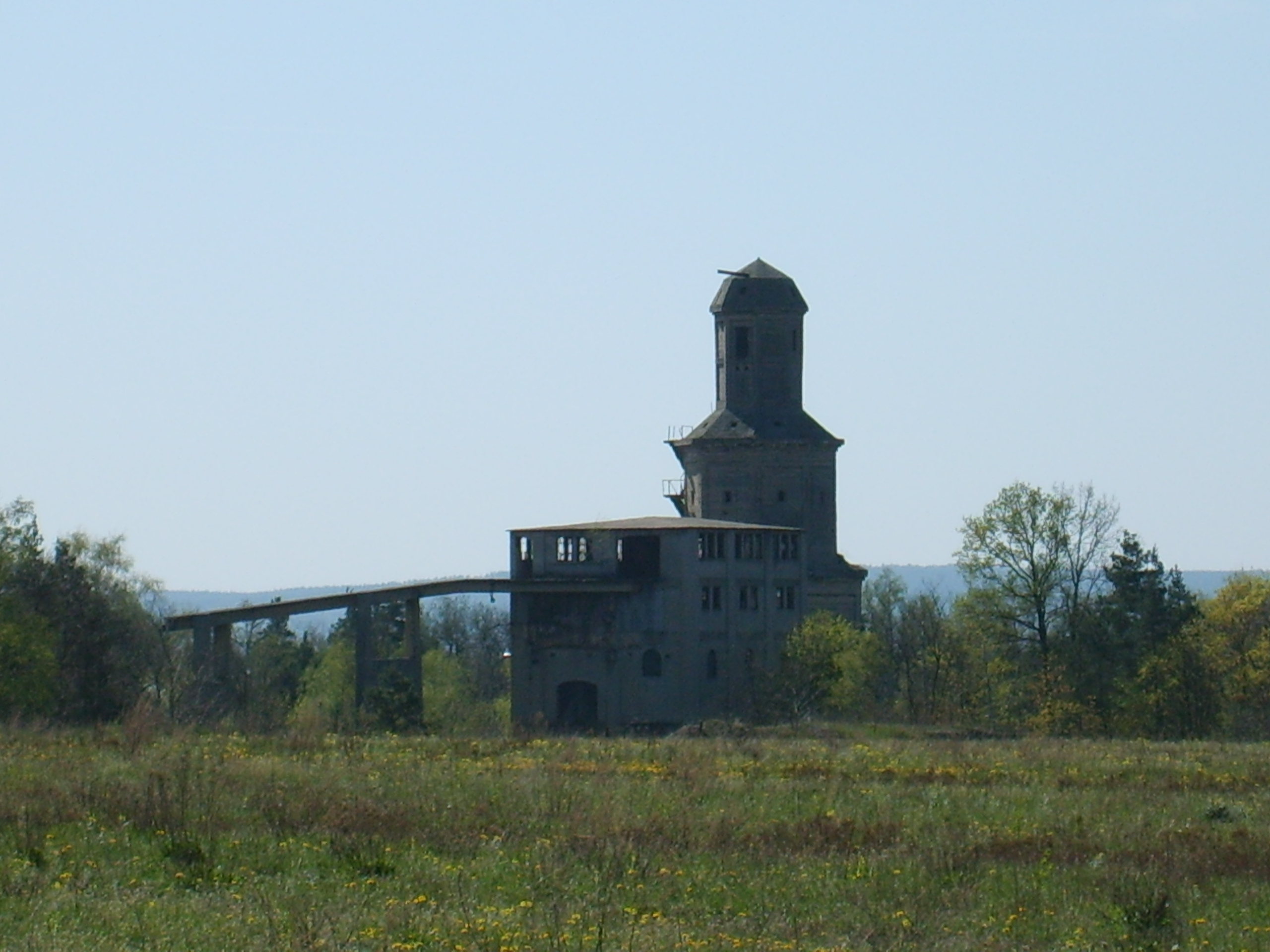
View from Döllingen

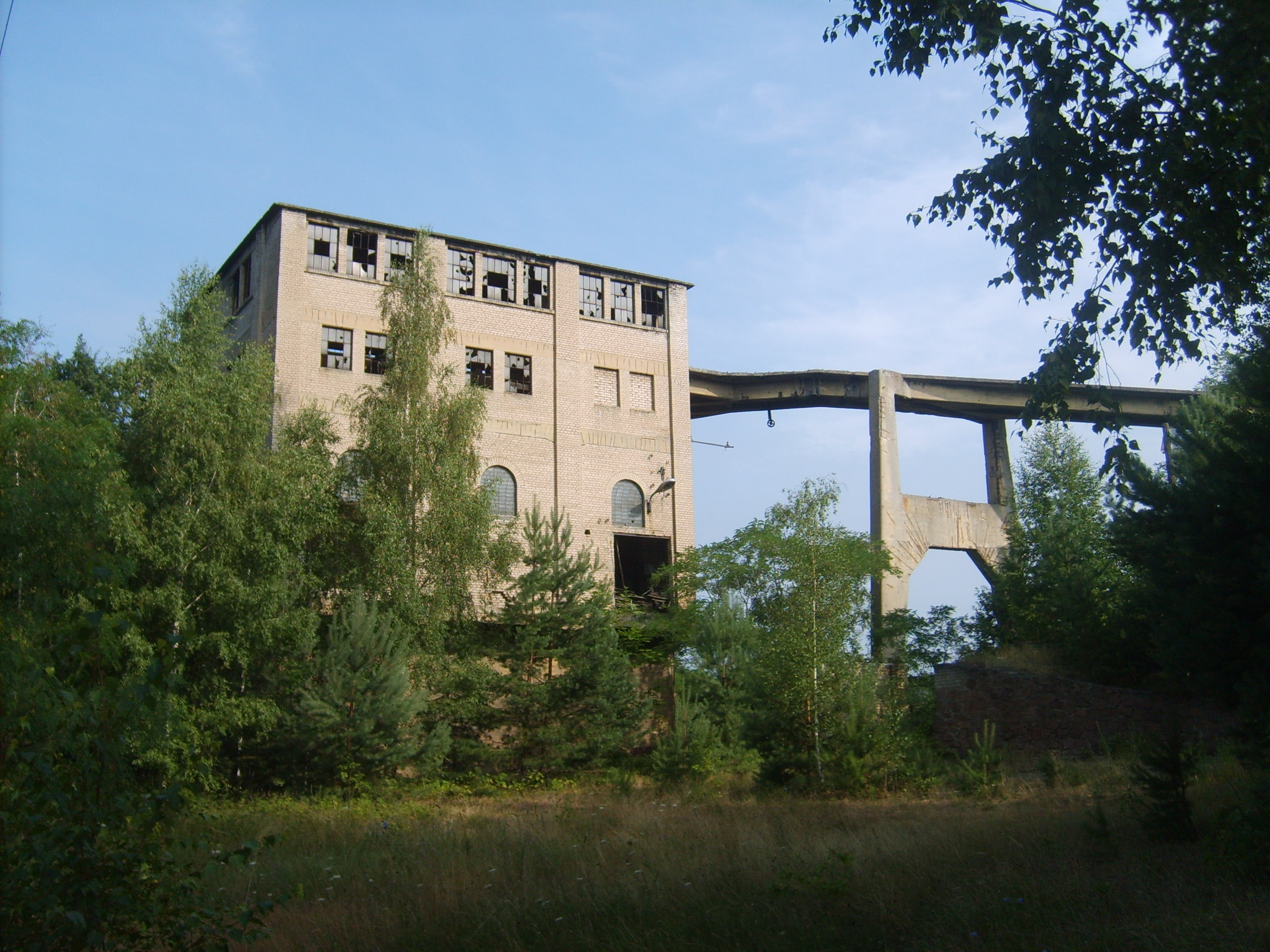
Mine Ada - Sorting bunker with cable car

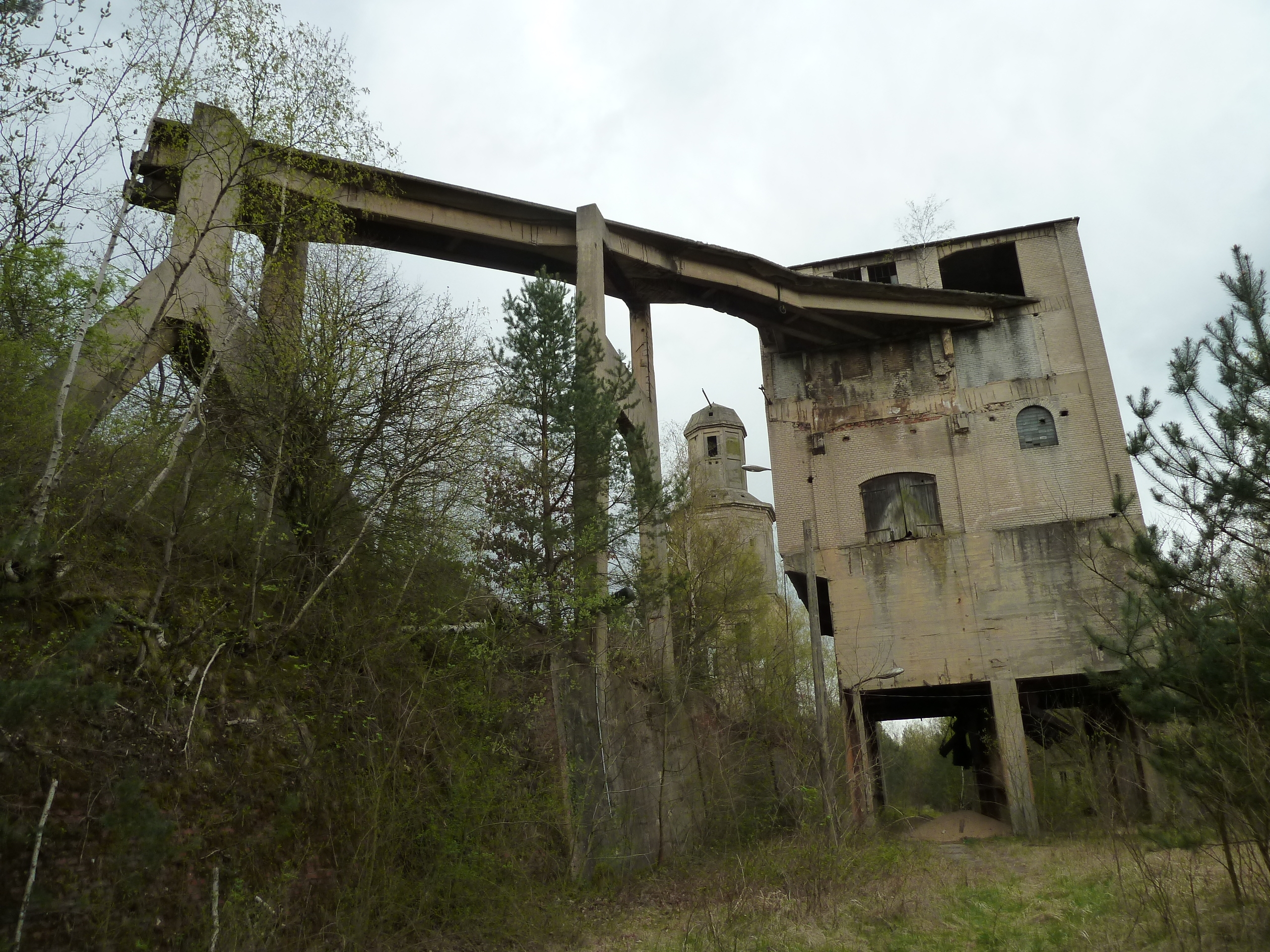
Cable car bridge

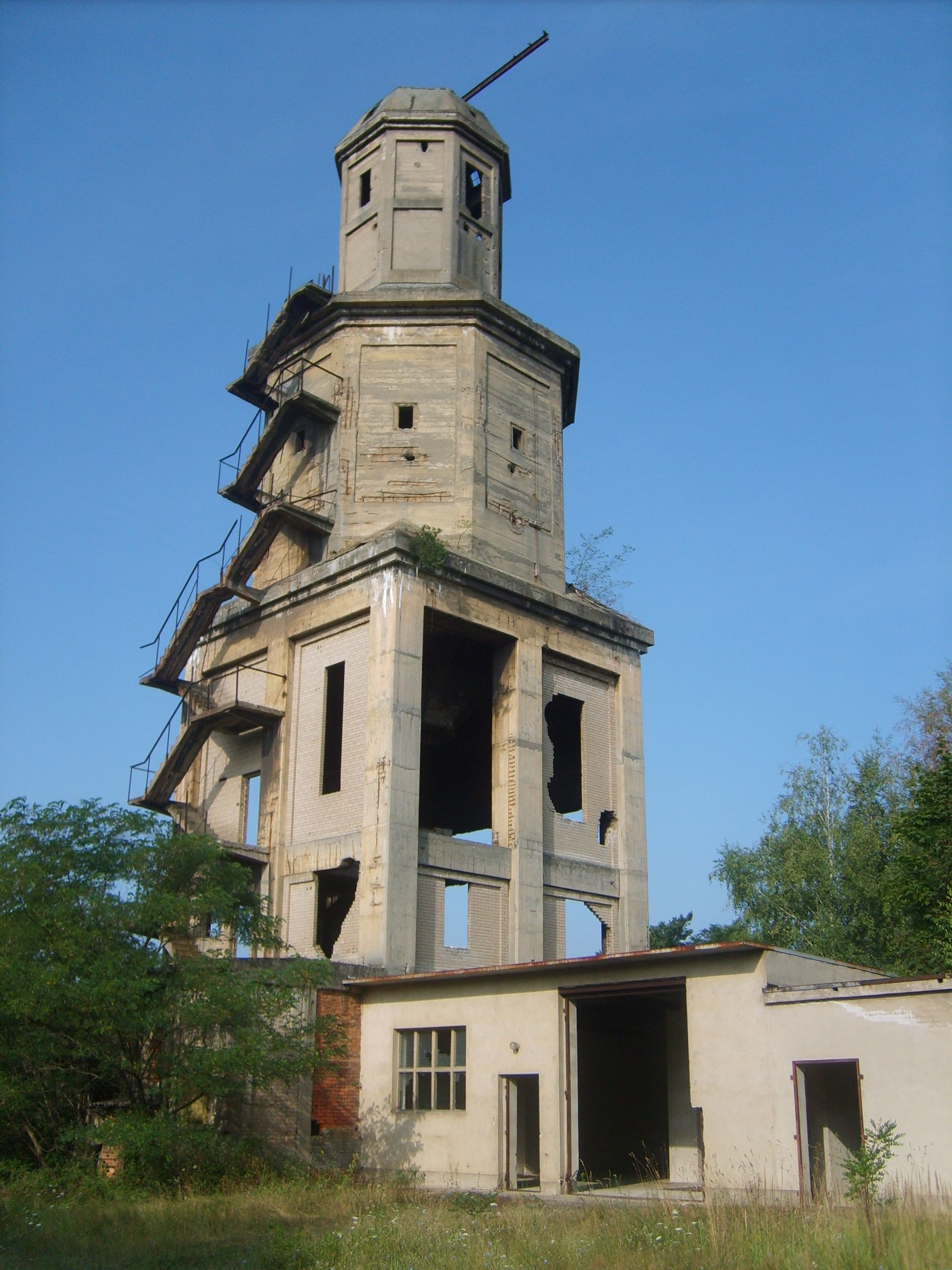
View of the tower from the rear

=== Historical background ===
German industrialization in the mid 19th century began with the discovery of brown coal deposits (also known as lignite) and the construction of the first railway tracks in the Elbe-Elster region. Lieutenant Colonel Hermann von Ploetz, a Prussian aristocrat who had resided on an estate in Doellingen near Elsterwerda since 1856, ordered his servants to drill for lignite on his property. The drilling was successful and thus, on April 1, 1857, lignite was extracted from a shaft known as Emilia a little east of Doellingen, which was the first time underground mining was carried out in the vicinity. However, the mine did not exist very long. Shortly afterwards, various additional mines were begun, but many of those (for example mine Robert, which was located just a few kilometers west of mine Emilia, did not last long.

=== Mine Ada ===
In 1911 the second lignite mine in this region was opened. It was an underground mine known as Ada run by the Doellinger Bergbaugesellschaft (Doellingen mining corporation) located north of the Falkenberg-Kohlfurt railway line and on the border between the two districts of Kahla and Doellingen. The coal field was about 4 meters thick and was covered by 30 meters of rock mass. The coal was extracted using the room and pillar system and was hauled up a ramp using a winch and an electric motor. Above ground, there were some drying plants and two briquette presses. The unprocessed coal, which was cut into pieces, sold well to mainly local customers. The majority of the low-quality coal was used to supply the mine with power and steam. In the mine, which occupied 118,000 square meters of space in the early 1920s, up to 170 workers were employed. In 1914 58,000 tons of lignite were produced. This amount of coal could not be produced again until the first year after World War I.

=== Bertzit Tower ===
In September 1915 the mining company applied to the mining authorities in Senftenberg for the construction of a Bertzit unit (named after the Bertzit procedure described below). The Bertzit tower was built in 1920 on the initiative of the management of the company running the mine Ada. It is 35 meters high and situated in close proximity to the mine. The tower has a square floor plan with a skeleton construction made of reinforced concrete. It was intended to be part of a coal drying plant, which would use the Bertzit procedure invented by Camillo Mahnhardt from Munich, to dry the lignite. This procedure was developed for the drying of inferior and moister fuels such as peat. The procedure was tested in Pasing near Munich and seemed to be more appealing financially. It promised a cost efficient product enhancement through the doubling of the fuel value. Furthermore, the mine had high lignite deposits, which were ideal for this procedure. It was intended to extract a high quality, anthracite coal-like product using an air-sealed reaction between 250 °C and 300 °C. The majority shareholders of the project were the Bertzit-Aktiengesellschaft in Berlin-Charlottenburg and the Bertzit-Gesellschaft mbH in Munich. The Döllinger mining company was probably just a minority shareholder, but was still a board member. In later years the headquarters of the young company moved to Munich.

It is largely unknown why the construction of this facility was not finished ultimately. Local historians assume the reason to be the technological immaturity of the project, which had never been industrially proven before, and therefore the Bertzit-Tower remained an investment ruin. Brown coal extraction in Kahla was stopped in 1929 due to its unprofitability and the last underground mine in the district of Liebenwerda, the mine Ada, was shut down the following year. By then brown coal was already being extracted from open-cast mines in Lauchhammer, to which the mine Ada belonged. In 1942 the mining director Friedrich von Delius had the world's first overburden conveyor bridge built. The bridge was built according to the director's own plans and was set in the mine Agnes in Plessa, near the mine Ada. It revolutionized the mining process, making it much easier.

According to the regional historian Jürgen Bartholomäus, the mining ledger of the mine Ada had been stored at the mining authorities in Senftenberg until the 1990s.

== Current Condition and Tourism ==
The Bertzit Tower ruin is 35 meters high and located in the lowlands, so it is visible from afar. Today it is considered the oldest investment ruin in the region. The striking shape and resemblance of this building with a Bavarian church tower, and indeed the Lighthouse of Alexandria, was intended and can be understood as a consequence of industrial heritage. At the turn of the millennium the complex was in danger of being demolished, but instead it was actually placed under conservation. Meanwhile, the complex has been neglected. Many remains of the former brown coal mining industry are located in the region, for example, the Plessa power plant, the Lauchhammer Biotowers (remains of a huge coke oven plant), the briquet company Louise in Domsdorf and the Conveyor Bridge F60.

The district of Kahla is located close to highway B169 and the Ruhland-Falkenberg/Elster railway line. Several cycleways connect the village and Bertzit Tower with various tourist attractions in the area, such as the Niederlausitz moorland and nearby Schradenland. Germany's longest bikeway (1111 km ), Tour Brandenbourg, was launched in 2007 and passes by the village. Other routes include the Fürst Pückler Way, the 108 kilometer Schwarze Elster cycle path and the Coal, Wind and Water route, a 250 kilometer journey into the history of energy, which was launched in 2007 and consists of 14 stations throughout the Elbe-Elster district.

== Bibliography ==
- Andreas Pöschl (Red.) (2001), Kulturamt des Landkreises Elbe-Elster (ed.), Kohle, Wind und Wasser. Ein energiehistorischer Streifzug durch das Elbe-Elsterland (in German), Herzberg/Elster, pp. 147–158, ISBN 3-00-008956-X
- Jürgen Bartholomäus (1991), "Der Bertzit-Turm bei Kahla", Die Schwarze Elster (in German), Bad Liebenwerda, pp. 17–18
- Autorenkollektiv (2003), Traditionsverein Braunkohle Lauchhammer e.V (ed.), Bergbaugeschichte im Revier Lauchhammer (in German), Lauchhammer
