= Schraden =

- Municipality
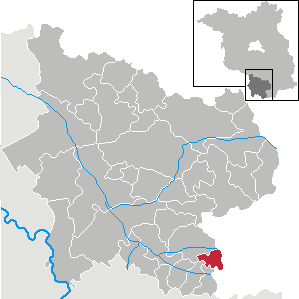
- Location of Schraden within Elbe-Elster district
- Interactive map of Schraden
- Location within Germany Location within Brandenburg
- Coordinates: 51°26′N 13°42′E
- Country: Germany
- State: Brandenburg
- District: Elbe-Elster
- Municipal assoc.: Plessa

Government
  - Mayor (2024–29): Olaf Redlich

Area
  - Total: 16.50 km^{2} (6.37 sq mi)
- Elevation: 92 m (302 ft)

Population (2025-12-31)
  - Total: 516
  - Density: 31.3/km^{2} (81.0/sq mi)
- Time zone: UTC+01:00 (CET)
  - Summer (DST): UTC+02:00 (CEST)
- Postal codes: 04928
- Dialling codes: 03574
- Vehicle registration: EE, FI, LIB
- Website: www.plessa.de

Schraden is a municipality in the Elbe-Elster district, in Brandenburg, Germany.

== History ==
From 1816 to 1944, Schraden was part of the Prussian Province of Saxony. From 1952 to 1990, Schraden was part of the Bezirk Cottbus of East Germany.

== Demography ==
Development of Population since 1875 within the Current Boundaries (Blue Line: Population; Dotted Line: Comparison to Population Development of Brandenburg state; Grey Background: Time of Nazi rule; Red Background: Time of Communist rule)

Schraden population development
within the current boundaries (2013)

Year	Pop.	±% p.a.
1875	100	—
1890	150	+2.74%
1910	100	−2.01%
1925	83	−1.23%
1933	473	+24.30%
1939	571	+3.19%
1946	718	+3.33%
1950	714	−0.14%
1964	675	−0.40%
1971	651	−0.52%
1981	629	−0.34%
1985	625	−0.16%
1989	607	−0.73%
1990	607	+0.00%
1991	596	−1.81%
1992	597	+0.17%
1993	605	+1.34%
1994	604	−0.17%
1995	607	+0.50%
1996	608	+0.16%

Year	Pop.	±% p.a.
1997	629	+3.45%
1998	647	+2.86%
1999	650	+0.46%
2000	641	−1.38%
2001	632	−1.40%
2002	614	−2.85%
2003	606	−1.30%
2004	607	+0.17%
2005	588	−3.13%
2006	584	−0.68%
2007	577	−1.20%
2008	556	−3.64%
2009	558	+0.36%
2010	554	−0.72%
2011	547	−1.26%
2012	542	−0.91%
2013	531	−2.03%
2014	518	−2.45%
2015	522	+0.77%
2016	505	−3.26%
