= Judge Gordon =

Judge Gordon may refer to:

- Andrew P. Gordon (born 1962), judge of the United States District Court for the District of Nevada
- Eugene Andrew Gordon (1917–2002), judge of the United States District Court for the Middle District of North Carolina
- Jack Murphy Gordon (1931–1982), judge of the United States District Court for the Eastern District of Louisiana
- James Fleming Gordon (1918–1990), judge of the United States District Court for the Western District of Kentucky
- Leo M. Gordon (born 1952), judge of the United States Court of International Trade
- Myron L. Gordon (1918–2009), judge of the United States District Court for the Eastern District of Wisconsin

== See also ==
- Justice Gordon (disambiguation)
