= Hohenleipisch =

- Municipality
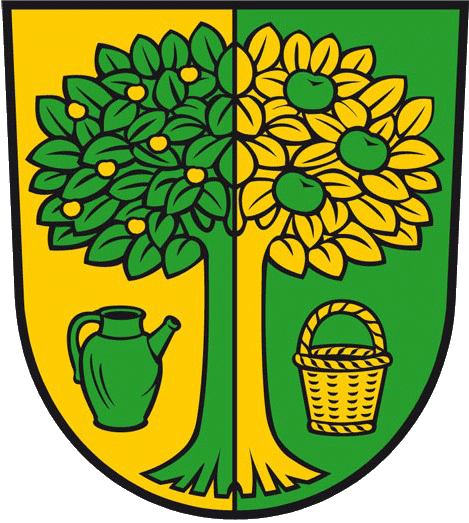
- Coat of arms

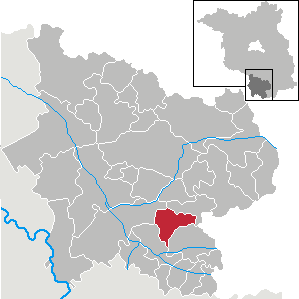
- Location of Hohenleipisch within Elbe-Elster district
- Interactive map of Hohenleipisch
- Location within Germany Location within Brandenburg
- Coordinates: 51°30′00″N 13°33′00″E
- Country: Germany
- State: Brandenburg
- District: Elbe-Elster
- Municipal assoc.: Plessa

Government
  - Mayor (2024–29): Lutz Schumann

Area
  - Total: 34.81 km^{2} (13.44 sq mi)
- Elevation: 135 m (443 ft)

Population (2025-12-31)
  - Total: 1,728
  - Density: 49.64/km^{2} (128.6/sq mi)
- Time zone: UTC+01:00 (CET)
  - Summer (DST): UTC+02:00 (CEST)
- Postal codes: 04934
- Dialling codes: 03533
- Vehicle registration: EE, FI, LIB

Hohenleipisch (Sorbian: Lubuš) is a municipality in the Elbe-Elster district, in Brandenburg, Germany.

== History ==
Two kilometres west of Hohenleipisch is an old brown coal and quartz sand pit called Grube Gotthold.

From 1952 to 1990, Hohenleipisch was part of the Bezirk Cottbus of East Germany.

== Demography ==
Development of Population since 1875 within the Current Boundaries (Blue Line: Population; Dotted Line: Comparison to Population Development of Brandenburg state; Grey Background: Time of Nazi rule; Red Background: Time of Communist rule)

Hohenleipisch: Population development within the current boundaries (2013)

Year	Population
1875	1 500
1890	1 700
1910	2 587
1925	2 888
1933	3 209
1939	3 321
1946	4 016
1950	3 937
1964	3 297
1971	3 252

Year	Population
1981	2 850
1985	2 759
1989	2 626
1990	2 608
1991	2 566
1992	2 516
1993	2 845
1994	3 024
1995	2 836
1996	3 001

Year	Population
1997	3 008
1998	3 022
1999	2 896
2000	2 822
2001	2 845
2002	2 803
2003	2 679
2004	2 660
2005	2 552
2006	2 383

Year	Population
2007	2 304
2008	2 258
2009	2 235
2010	2 171
2011	2 188
2012	2 148
2013	2 089
2014	2 069
2015	2 048
2016	2 056
