= Gordon S. Murray =

American investment banker and writer

- Born: 1950
- Died: 15 January 2011 (aged 60–61); Burlingame, California, U.S.
- Education: University of North Carolina at Chapel Hill (A.B.); Columbia Business School (M.B.A.)
- Occupations: Investment banker, author
- Notable work: The Investment Answer (2010)

Gordon Stewart Murray (1950–2011) was an American investment banker and writer who co-authored The Investment Answer (2010).

== Early life and education ==
Murray was born in Richmond, Virginia in 1950. He earned an A.B. in political science from the University of North Carolina at Chapel Hill before completing an M.B.A. at Columbia Business School.

== Career ==
Murray joined Goldman Sachs in the mid-1970s, rising through institutional fixed-income sales. Senior roles followed at Lehman Brothers and Credit Suisse First Boston, where he was a managing director responsible for large institutional clients. After leaving Wall Street in 2001, he consulted to Dimensional Fund Advisors, an asset manager known for its passive, research-based approach.

In 2008, Murray was diagnosed with glioblastoma and, after a recurrence in 2010, he stopped treatment to spend his remaining months writing The Investment Answer with long-time friend and adviser Daniel C. Goldie. Self-published in August 2010 and acquired by Business Plus four months later, the 96-page guide reached U.S. best-seller lists following features on network television and public radio.
