= Gordonia =

Gordonia may refer to:

== Biology ==
- Gordonia (plant), a genus of flowering plants native to Southeast Asia and the Americas
- Gordonia (bacterium), a genus of bacteria
- Gordonia (synapsid), an extinct animal from the Permian

== Other uses ==
- Gordonia (youth movement), a Zionist youth movement
- Gordonia (film), a 2010 documentary
- 305 Gordonia, an asteroid
- USS Gordonia, an American ship
- Gordonia District, a district of Cape Province, South Africa

== See also ==
- Gordon (disambiguation)
