= Grube Gotthold =

Coordinates: 51°30′14.16″N 13°31′39.04″E

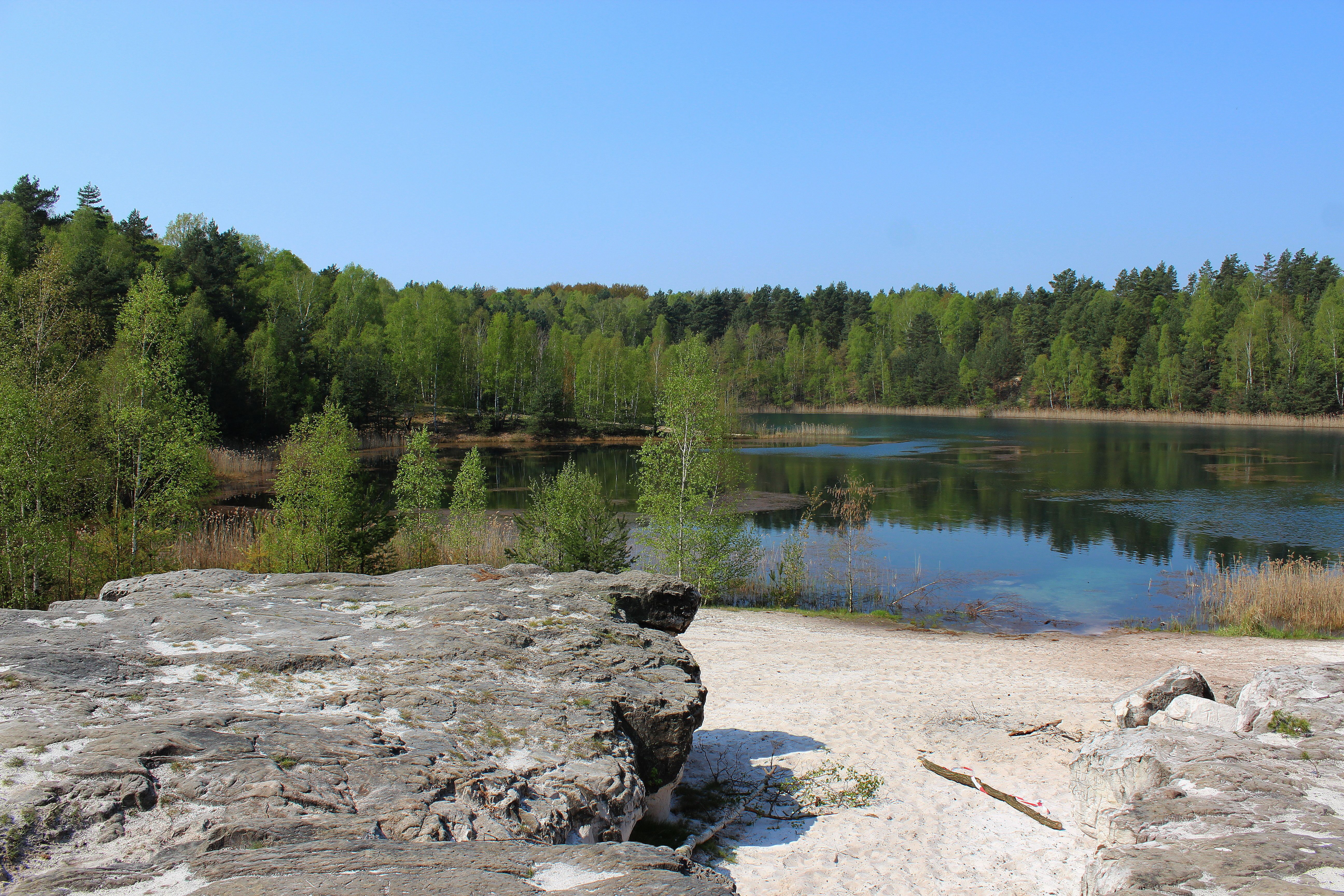
Grube Gotthold

Grube Gotthold ("Gotthold Pit") is a former brown coal and gravel pit in the South Brandenburg county of Elbe-Elster.

== History ==
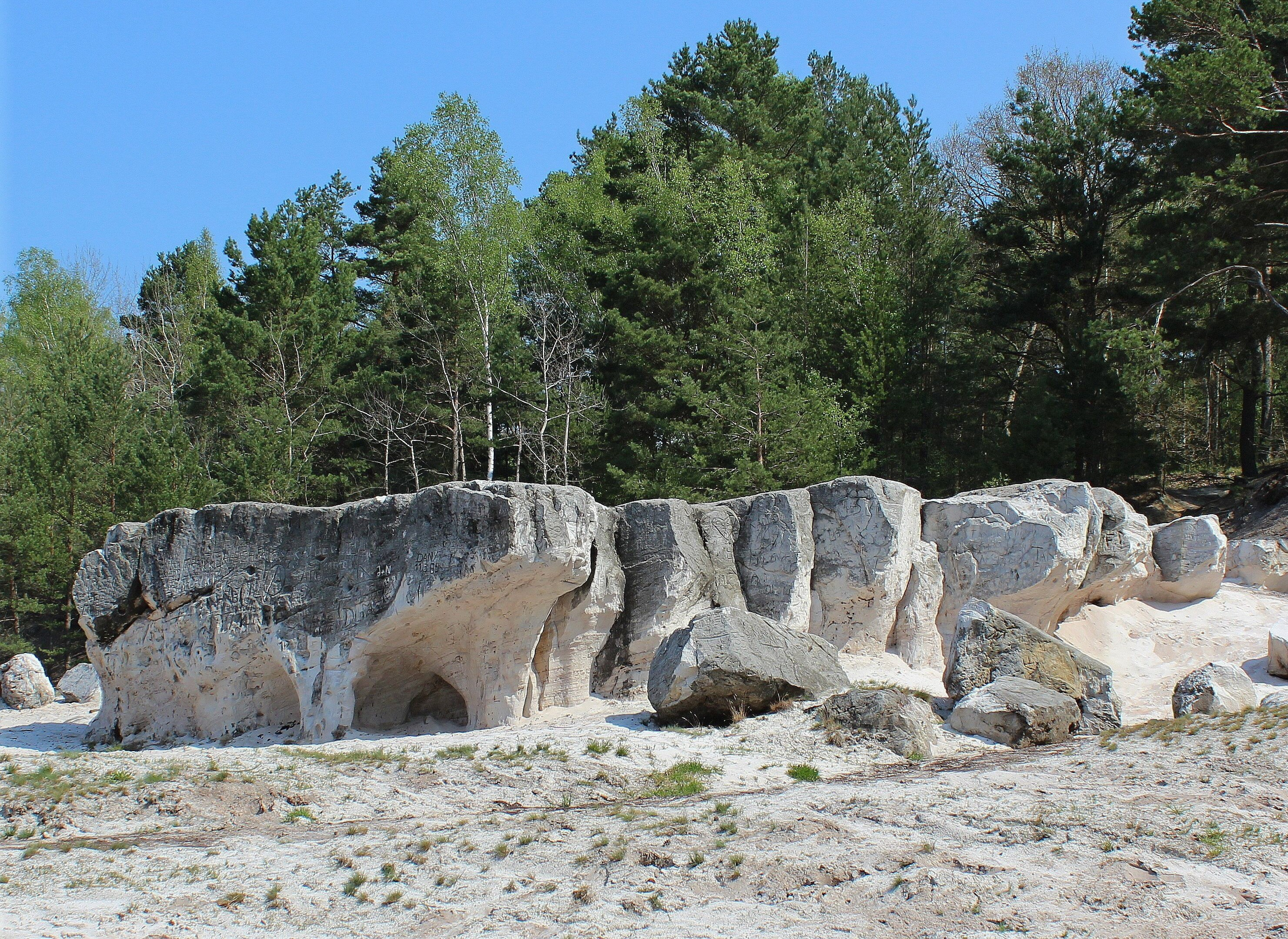
Protected as a geotope by the Brandenburg State Office for Geoscience and Raw Materials: petrified quartz sand.

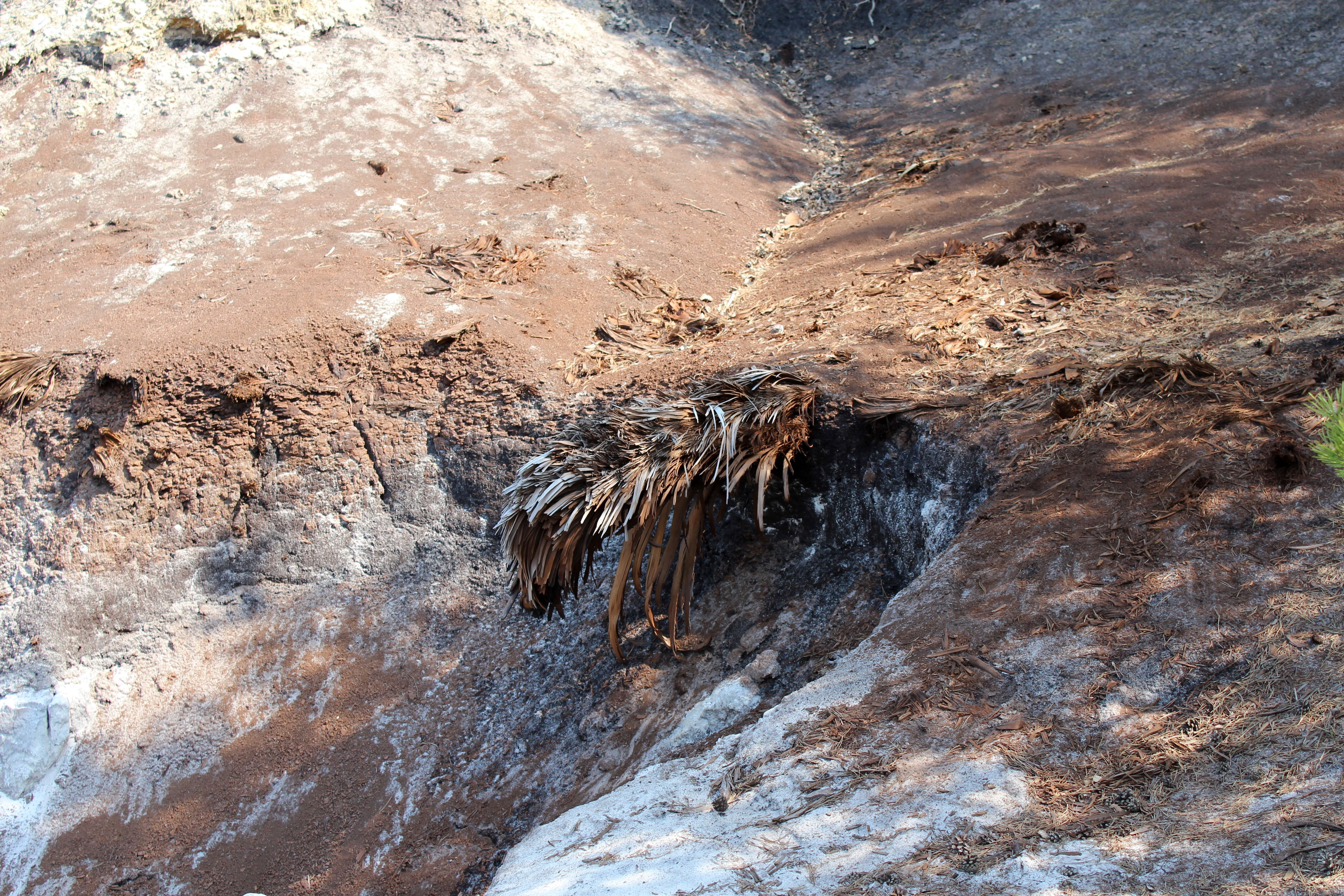
Brown coal seam

The former mine known as Grube Gotthold is located about 2 kilometres west of the village of Hohenleipisch in the German state of Brandenburg. The Lusatian Lower Seam (Unterflöz, 2nd Lusatian seam horizon, middle Miocene) reaches a thickness here of 2.7 to 4.0 metres. The pit was opened on 22 March 1912 and brown coal was initially mined underground. A narrow gauge pit railway transported the coal to the loading ramp of the Upper Lusatian Gravel and Sand Works (Oberlausitzer Kies- und Sandwerke, OKS) about 3 kilometres away in Biehla. An entry in the companies register on 17 January 1913 records the Gotthold Brown Coal Mine (Braunkohlengrube Gotthold). The first managers of the business, which had its head office in Elsterwerda and a share capital of initially 39,000 marks, were Paul Freitag and Franz Kotik. By 1913 the pit had reached its peak brown coal production of 20,860 tonnes. From 1914, open cast mining became increasingly important alongside underground mining operations. As well as brown coal the mine also extracted crystalline quartz sand. From 1916 to 1919 a steam excavator (Dampflöffelbagger) was used; it was replaced in 1920 by a bucket dredger (Eimerkettenbagger) with a maximum carrying capacity of 150 m^{3}/h.

The extraction of quartz sand became increasingly important and, in the end, threatened the coal mining operation. In 1922 of the 23 employees in the mine, only one was a coal worker. In the same year, the narrow gauge railway, whose obvious lack of safety led to numerous complaints, was replaced by a cable railway.

During the Second World War almost all the young men employed in the mine were called up for military service and were initially replaced by French prisoners of war. From 1943, 15 Soviet prisoners of war from Stalag IV-B at Mühlberg worked here. Evcen when their working day ended they were sent to help in the strawberry fields of Hohenleipisch. In 1945 mining operations came to a standstill because the pumping station no longer worked and the pit slowly filled with water.

A devastating forest fire on the Liebenwerda Heath in 1947 destroyed a huge area of the adjacent forest as well as all the mining buildings and burned out the coal seam at Grube Gotthold, leading to the final closure of the mine.

From 1960, large parts of the adjacent forest of the old Liebenwerda District Heathland (Liebenwerdaer Amtsheide) were used as a military training area by the NVA. In the course of the expansion of this area, Grube Gotthold was placed out-of-bounds. It was planned to be used for water training for engineer and recce troops, but due to the geological circumstances of the mine, these plans were never put into action.

Today the terrain of the former brown coal pit is part of the Forsthaus Prösa Nature Reserve which was established in 1990.
