= Gordon Anderson =

Gordon Anderson may refer to:

- Gordon Anderson (author) (born 1947), author and secretary-general of the Professors World Peace Academy
- Gordon Anderson (cricketer) (1922–2013), New Zealand cricketer
- Gordon Anderson (politician) (1897–1958), former member of the Australian House of Representatives
- Gordon Sutherland Anderson (1954–2024), mayor of Grants Pass and state legislator of Oregon
- Gordon Anderson, better known as Lone Pigeon, musician and founding member of The Beta Band
- Gordon Anderson (record producer), see The Rowans
- Gordon Anderson (squash player), squash player from Canada
- Gordon Anderson, a B-movie recurrent hero played by Richard Harrison in his many ninja films
- Gordon Anderson (director), television director
- Gordon Anderson (footballer) (1924–1965), Australian rules footballer
- Gordon Anderson (sculptor) (born 1944), American actor, fashion designer, sculptor; widower of actress Sondra Locke
- Gordon Stewart Anderson (1958–1991), Canadian writer
