= Plessa =

- Municipality
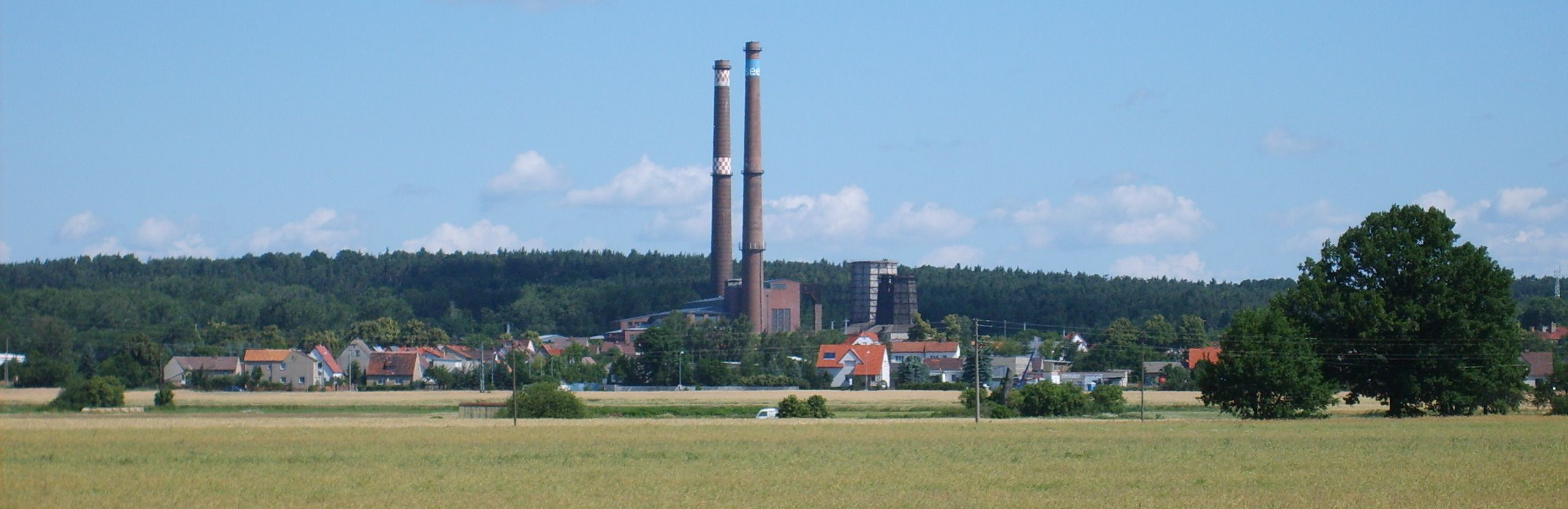

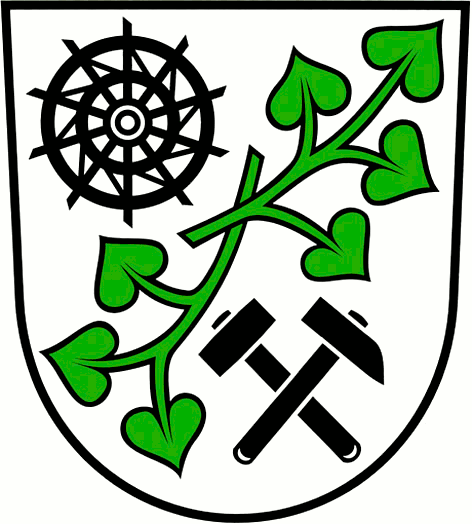
- Coat of arms

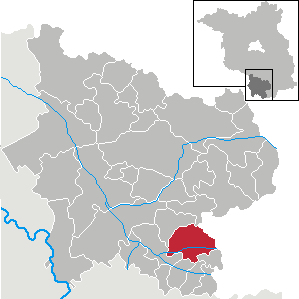
- Location of Plessa within Elbe-Elster district
- Interactive map of Plessa
- Location within Germany Location within Brandenburg
- Coordinates: 51°28′00″N 13°37′00″E
- Country: Germany
- State: Brandenburg
- District: Elbe-Elster
- Municipal assoc.: Plessa
- Subdivisions: 2 Ortsteile

Government
  - Mayor (2024–29): Siegfried Nußbeck

Area
  - Total: 52.42 km^{2} (20.24 sq mi)
- Elevation: 94 m (308 ft)

Population (2025-12-31)
  - Total: 2,472
  - Density: 47.16/km^{2} (122.1/sq mi)
- Time zone: UTC+01:00 (CET)
  - Summer (DST): UTC+02:00 (CEST)
- Postal codes: 04928
- Dialling codes: 03533
- Vehicle registration: EE, FI, LIB
- Website: www.plessa.de

Plessa (Lower Sorbian: Plesow, pronounced [ˈplɛsɔw]) is a municipality in the Elbe-Elster district, in Brandenburg, Germany.

Following a redrawing of local boundaries which took effect on 31 December 2001, the municipality includes two additional settlements, and therefore now includes Plessa-Süd, Döllingen and Kahla.

== History ==
The first surviving record of Plessa appears in the 1406 "Landbethe zu Hayn", where a total area of slightly more than 24 Oxgangs is recorded. The name "Ples(o)" comes from an old Sorbian word for a lake, and probably refers to backwaters of the Black Elster River, now to an extent channelled, but which in the fifteenth century, with numerous small tributaries meandered through the area. Taxes were paid to the Elsterwerda Castle, home to the lords who owned the land.

The earliest record of a simple unadorned wooden chapel appears in 1540, at this stage without any cross or candle sticks for the altar. Preaching at this time would still have taken place in Sorbian. In 1792 a stone church was built, but on 25 October 1811 the village, still mostly comprising timber buildings, was struck by a major fire which only four farmsteads survived. Beside the church the adjacent school house was also badly damaged. The present church was erected in 1814, with an organ installed in 1818.

From 1816 to 1944, Plessa was part of the Prussian Province of Saxony. The Oberlausitzer Railway. running from Kohlfurt to Falkenberg, opened in 1874, crossing Plessa, but initially there was no provision for the trains to stop, following opposition to railway development from local farmers who had refused to provide land for a larger line which would open the next year linking Berlin with Dresden. Nevertheless, industrialisation soon began, and Plessa received its own stop on the railway line in 1885, with a station building following in 1891. Shortly after that, in 1894, the "Agnes" Brown-coal mine opened, which led to the establishment in 1897 of the "Plessaer Braunkohlenwerke GmbH" (Plessau Brown-coal company). In 1901 a Briquette factory opened to the north of the railway line. Brown-coal provided a basis for a more general increase in economic activity and the village began to grow, the registered population increasing from 1,200 to 2,063 between 1890 and 1910. The briquette factory developed a side-line in electricity generation, providing a local power network to which 12 electric motors and almost 400 electric lights were connected. The mine director, a man called Friedrich von Delius, nurtured ambitions for the business of power generation and in 1927, after a nine-month construction period, a full-scale power station operated from (and by) the briquette factory came online.

The Second World War cost Plessa 391 dead. The worst days were the 24th and 25 April 1945, when the Red Army broke through. Plessa was identified by the invaders as a "Partisanendorf" (Partisan village): 724 buildings were burned down and 155 villagers died.

After the war the briquette factory and other industrial businesses were nationalised in 1950, shortly after the formal establishment of the German Democratic Republic. By this time the population of Plessa had increased to 3,423. In the next few years the land that had yielded up its lignite on the western side of the Plessa Heath was planted with fruit orchards. The most successful crop came from the sweet cherry trees which are able to tolerate relatively poor soil quality.

From 1952 to 1990, Plessa was part of the Bezirk Cottbus of East Germany. On 1 January 1957 Plessa-Süd (previously known as Grödener Schraden) was incorporated into Plessa.

A serious accident took place in 1983 at the Plessa Briquette factory when a coal gas explosion caused several deaths and left many injured.

Local government reorganization followed two years after reunification in 1992, and Plessa became the centre of the Plessa collective municipality, incorporating seven individually small municipalities. In 1998 the power station became a project of the "Fürst-Pückler-Land" regional redevelopment programme.

== Demography ==
Development of Population since 1875 within the Current Boundaries (Blue Line: Population; Dotted Line: Comparison to Population Development of Brandenburg state; Grey Background: Time of Nazi rule; Red Background: Time of Communist rule)

Plessa: Population development
within the current boundaries (2018)

Year	Pop.	±% p.a.
1875	1,600	—
1890	1,820	+0.86%
1910	2,863	+2.29%
1925	3,418	+1.19%
1933	3,801	+1.34%
1939	3,936	+0.58%
1946	4,409	+1.63%
1950	4,946	+2.91%
1964	4,787	−0.23%
1971	4,799	+0.04%
1981	4,385	−0.90%
1985	4,178	−1.20%
1989	3,990	−1.14%
1990	3,928	−1.55%

Year	Pop.	±% p.a.
1991	3,824	−2.65%
1992	3,797	−0.71%
1993	3,764	−0.87%
1994	3,700	−1.70%
1995	3,648	−1.41%
1996	3,604	−1.21%
1997	3,551	−1.47%
1998	3,560	+0.25%
1999	3,494	−1.85%
2000	3,459	−1.00%
2001	3,414	−1.30%
2002	3,383	−0.91%
2003	3,333	−1.48%
2004	3,316	−0.51%

Year	Pop.	±% p.a.
2005	3,216	−3.02%
2006	3,153	−1.96%
2007	3,051	−3.24%
2008	2,991	−1.97%
2009	2,921	−2.34%
2010	2,887	−1.16%
2011	2,864	−0.80%
2012	2,825	−1.36%
2013	2,791	−1.20%
2014	2,778	−0.47%
2015	2,713	−2.34%
2016	2,671	−1.55%
2017	2,651	−0.75%
2018	2,654	+0.11%

== Photogallery ==
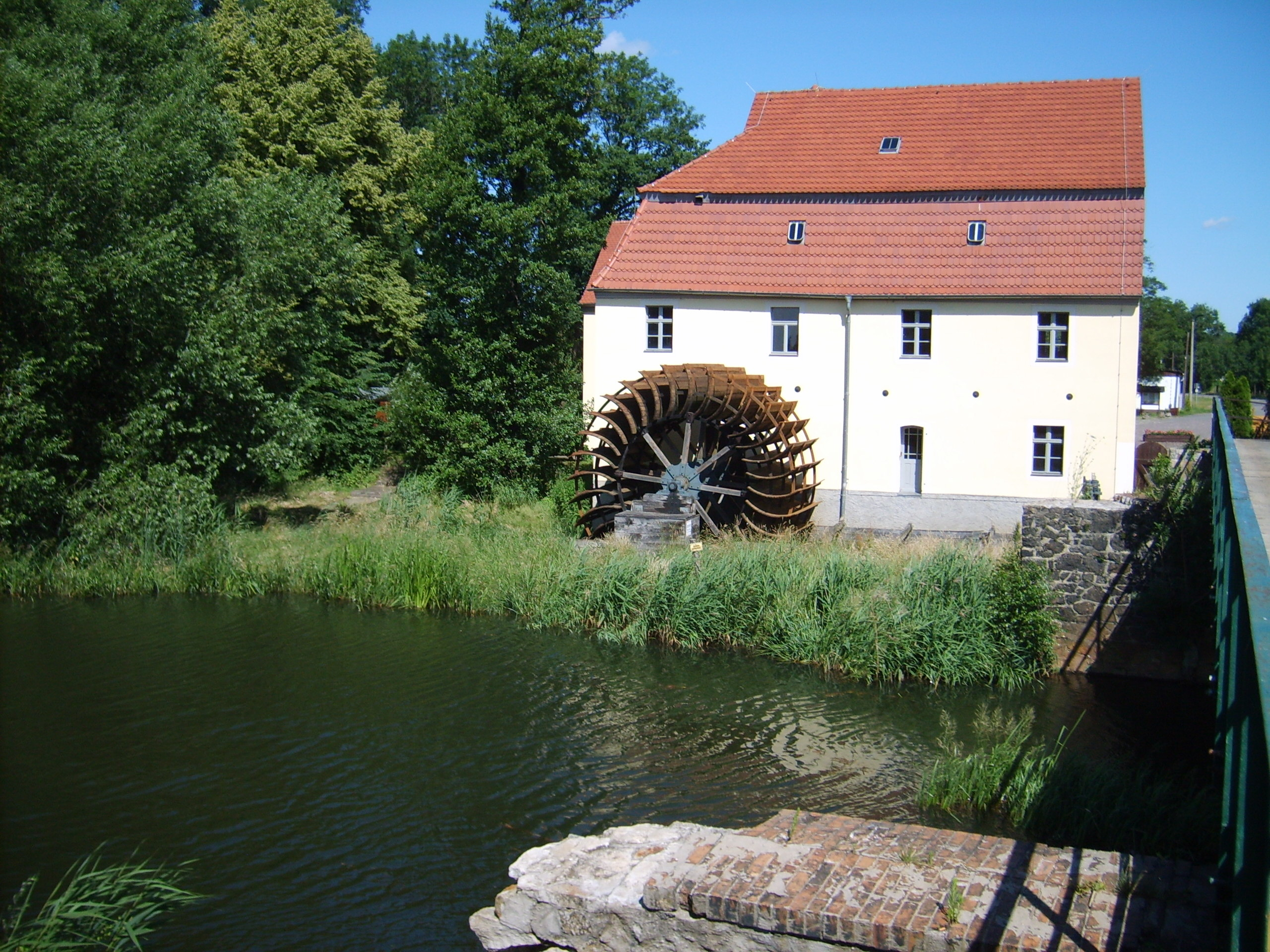
Elster mill in Plessa

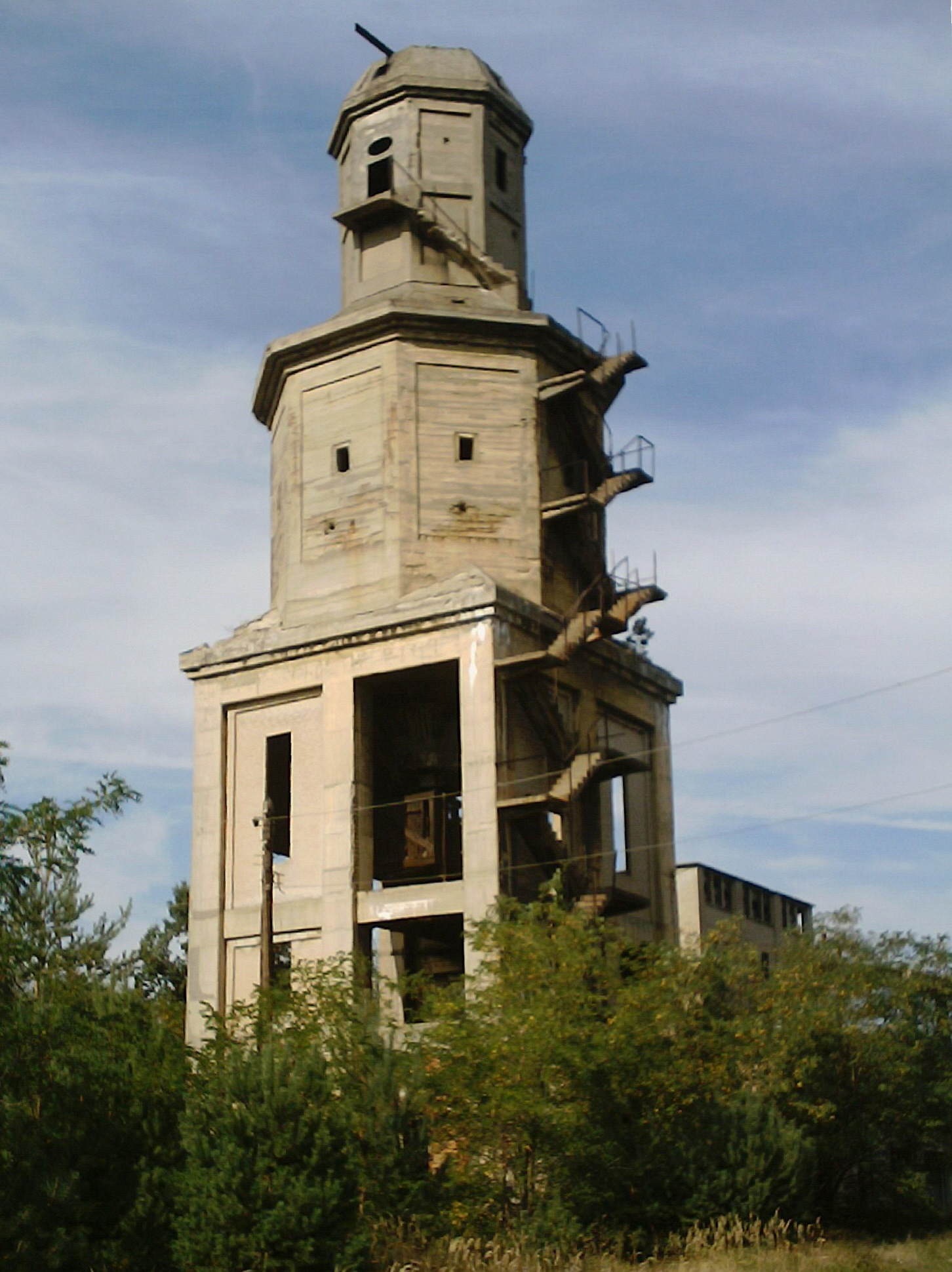
Bertzit Tower in Kahla

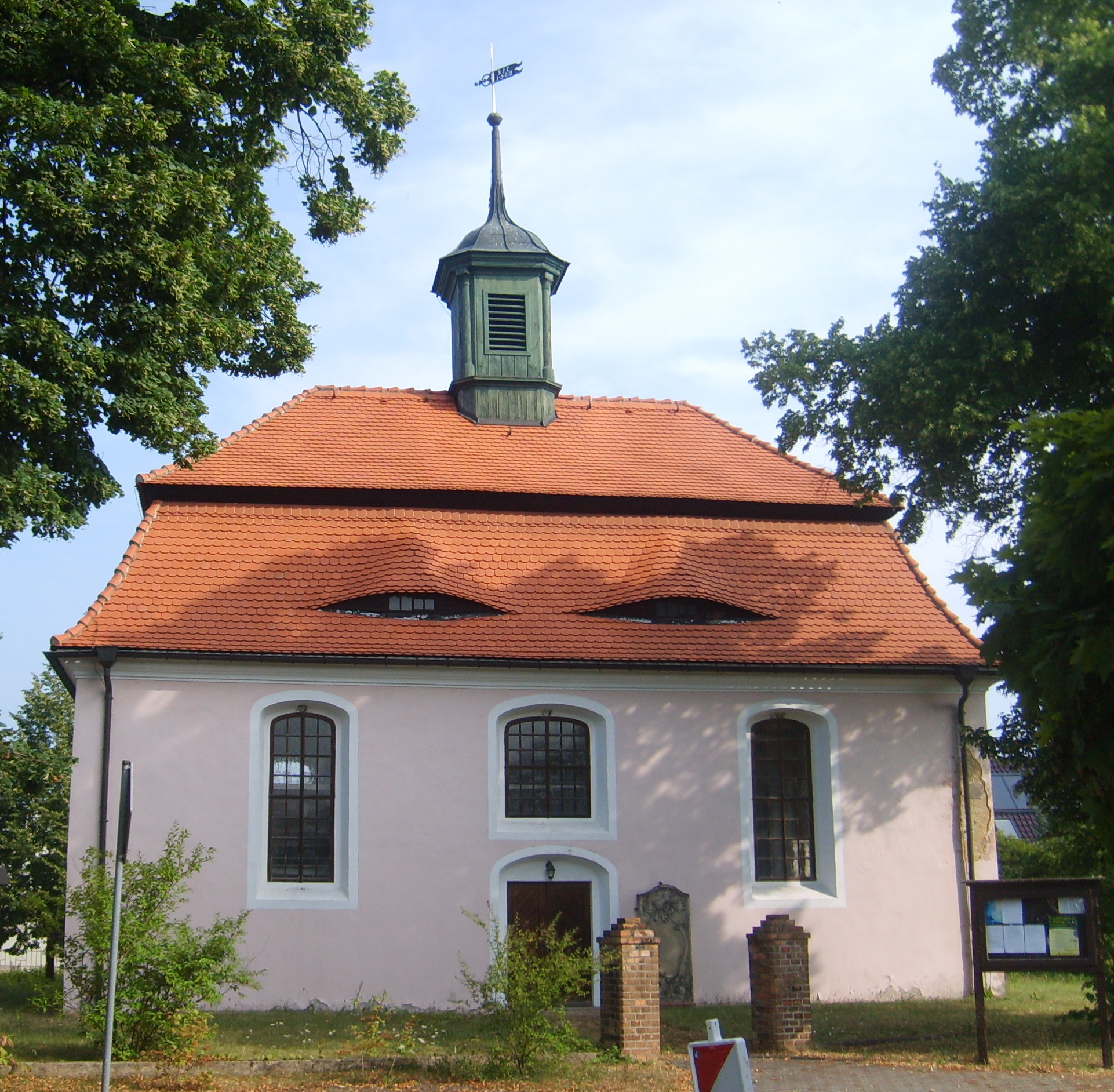
Church in Döllingen
