= Plessa (Amt) =

- Amt
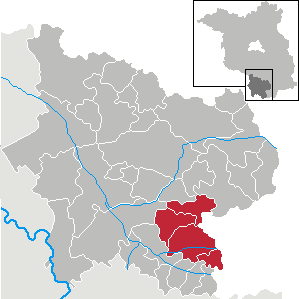
- Map of Elbe-Elster highlighting Plessa
- Interactive map of Plessa
- Location within Germany Location within Brandenburg
- Coordinates: 51°28′N 13°37′E
- Country: Germany
- State: Brandenburg
- District: Elbe-Elster
- Seat: Plessa
- Subdivisions: 4 municipalities

Area
  - Total: 132.8 km^{2} (51.3 sq mi)

Population (2025-12-31)
  - Total: 5,620
  - Density: 42.3/km^{2} (110/sq mi)
- Time zone: UTC+01:00 (CET)
  - Summer (DST): UTC+02:00 (CEST)
- Website: www.plessa.de

Amt Plessa is an Amt ("collective municipality") in the district of Elbe-Elster, in Brandenburg, Germany. Its seat is in Plessa.

The Amt Plessa consists of the following municipalities:

1. Gorden-Staupitz
2. Hohenleipisch
3. Plessa
4. Schraden

== Demography ==
Development of Population since 1875 within the Current Boundaries (Blue Line: Population; Dotted Line: Comparison to Population Development of Brandenburg state; Grey Background: Time of Nazi rule; Red Background: Time of Communist rule)

Recent Population Development and Projections (Population Development before Census 2011 (blue line); Recent Population Development according to the Census in Germany in 2011 (blue bordered line); Official projections for 2005-2030 (yellow line); for 2017-2030 (scarlet line); for 2020-2030 (green line)

Amt Plessa: Population development
within the current boundaries (2020)

Year	Pop.	±% p.a.
1875	4,131	—
1890	4,722	+0.90%
1910	6,746	+1.80%
1925	7,723	+0.91%
1939	9,257	+1.30%
1950	11,382	+1.90%
1964	10,345	−0.68%
1971	10,222	−0.17%
1981	9,249	−1.00%

Year	Pop.	±% p.a.
1985	8,934	−0.86%
1990	8,454	−1.10%
1995	8,339	−0.27%
2000	8,136	−0.49%
2005	7,504	−1.60%
2010	6,671	−2.33%
2015	6,240	−1.33%
2020	5,974	−0.87%
2025	5,620	−1.21%
