= Gordon Harris (Australian cricketer) =

Australian cricketer

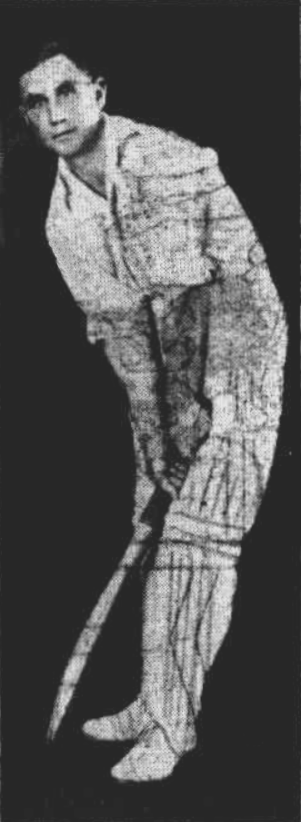

Personal information
- Full name: Gordon William Harris
- Born: 11 December 1897; Alberton, South Australia
- Died: 30 June 1974 (aged 77); Adelaide, South Australia
- Batting: Right-handed
- Bowling: Right-arm medium-pace
- Role: Batsman

Domestic team information
- Years: Team
- 1921-22 to 1930-31: South Australia

Career statistics
Competition	First-class
Matches	37
Runs scored	2294
Batting average	34.75
100s/50s	4/12
Top score	183
Balls bowled	40
Wickets	2
Bowling average	15.00
5 wickets in innings	0
10 wickets in match	0
Best bowling	2/8
Catches/stumpings	14/–
- Source: Cricinfo, 18 April 2022

Gordon Harris (11 December 1897 – 30 June 1974) was an Australian cricketer. He played in 37 first-class matches for South Australia between 1920 and 1931.

== See also ==
- List of South Australian representative cricketers
