= Gordon W. Smith =

Gordon William Smith (1920–2010) was an artist and collector of American Indian art and ethnographic materials who lived in and was a native of Fort Worth, Texas. His collection of American Indian art, which was featured between August 2008 and August 2009 in a special exhibition at the Houston Museum of Natural Science entitled Quest for High Bear: A Boy’s Odyssey Through Indian Country 1925-1939, and has been display at the Fort Worth Museum of Science and History since November 2009, was acquired by the Houston Museum of Natural Science in 2009. Gordon W. Smith was also a publisher, and was an officer in the US Navy during World War II. He died on March 4, 2010, in Fort Worth, Texas.

== Life ==
Born in Fort Worth as the grandson of a pioneer family that had moved to North Texas in the 1870s, Gordon Smith grew up hearing tales of Indians from his grandparents. In 1925, at the age of five, while on a family vacation in Glacier National Park, Montana, Smith met Two-Guns-White-Calf, a Blackfoot chief who gave him a small black rawhide rattle. Meeting Two-Guns-White-Calf began a boyhood odyssey through the American West that would lead to an enduring love for the indigenous cultures of North America. The small rattle was the first object of a collection that grew to over 1000 pieces, almost all of which were collected between 1925 and the beginning of World War II from Indians themselves and from Indian traders.

In World War II, he served in the US Navy as captain of two ships in the Pacific. He was made captain of his first ship, LCT 68, in 1943 at age 22, and was spot-promoted to full lieutenant at age 23 upon taking command of his second ship, LSM 37 . As captain of these two ships, he participated in thirteen landings on Japanese-held islands.

After the war, he obtained an MA in English literature at Columbia University (‘50), where he also studied studio art with noted Italian sculptor Oronzio Maldarelli. He also had a BA in English literature from Southern Methodist University.

In 1950, he founded Smiths, Inc., a publishing house based in Fort Worth, and in 1962, he co-founded Smith Studios with his brother James Hulbert, an architectural arts firm of which he was principal and chief designer. Smith Studios completed over 800 commissioned works in 14 states before it closed upon his retirement in 2003 at the age of 82, to devote himself more fully to cataloging his collection of American Indian materials, painting on American Indian themes, and writing a book on his experiences with Indians.

== Work ==
=== Collection of American Indian Art and Ethnographic Materials ===
Smith has been noted for his early involvement with America Indians. “Mr. Smith had a unique relationship with several American Indian tribes, as is evidenced by the number of gifts he exchanged with them,” said Dirk Van Tuerenhout, Ph.D., curator of anthropology at the Houston Museum of Natural Science. “He was their friend during a time when being an American Indian had an extremely negative connotation in the United States.”

Smith’s parents wholeheartedly supported his interest in American Indians and enabled his amassing of a large collection of Indian art and ethnographic objects in the 1920s and 1930s. From age 5 onward, at least once a year, Smith’s father, W. D. Smith – an attorney and one of the early partners of the Fort Worth law firm Cantey Hangar – and his mother Mary Anna took him on trips to visit Indians that often lasted one or two months. In this way, he learned from the Indians themselves about their histories, beliefs, and lifeways, and he collected examples of their material culture – objects in many cases given to him by the Indians he knew.

Smith visited every Indian “culture area” of North America. He met Indians, and he learned from them as he collected objects that he knew they valued themselves. During the 1930s he made many friends among Plains Indians, especially among the Lakota Sioux, including still-living elders who had fought the invading white man in the 19th century, but had by then been moved to reservations. As he grew older, he spent longer periods of time with Indians, particularly at Pine Ridge Reservation in South Dakota. He was inducted in 1934 into the Lakota Sioux tribe at a ceremony in Kansas City, where he was given the Indian name High Bear (Mato Wankantu).

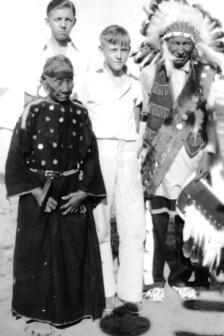
Gordon W. Smith with Indian elders at Pine Ridge Reservation, ca. 1935

His boyhood sojourns in Indian Country ended with the coming of World War II. Nevertheless, this was only an interlude in his lifelong study of American Indians and their cultures. In the last decade of his life, he completed a book about his experiences, and also painted several works on Indian themes.

The first major exhibition drawn from the Gordon W. Smith American Indian collection, entitled Quest for High Bear: A Boy’s Odyssey Through Indian Country 1925-1939, opened in August, 2008, at the Houston Museum of Natural Science. Objects from the Gordon Smith collection have in the past been on display in the Amon Carter Museum in Fort Worth, the Dallas Museum of Art, and previously at the Fort Worth Museum of Science and History.

In September, 2009, the Houston Museum of Natural Science announced that it had acquired the Smith Collection. As steward of the collection, the Houston Museum of Natural Science also announced that it has entered into a cooperative sharing program with the Fort Worth Museum of Science and History. The Fort Worth Museum of Science and History opened the exhibition "Quest for High Bear" as part of the opening exhibits at its new building in November, 2009, and a program of ongoing loans and exhibits from the Gordon W. Smith American Indian Collection is planned between the Houston Museum of Natural Science and the Fort Worth Museum of Science and History.

=== Works of Art and Smith Studios ===
Primarily known for his works of architectural art in the media of stained glass, mosaic, and sculpture, for 41 years Gordon Smith was the principal and chief designer of Smith Studios (previously Smith Stained Glass Studios), an architectural arts firm he founded based in Fort Worth, Texas. Between 1962 and 2003, he designed and created more than 800 commissioned works, including stained glass windows, sculptures, and mosaics in churches, office buildings, and private homes in 14 states.

These include a large “wall of glass” installation depicting "Creation" in the chapel of New Mexico Military Institute in Roswell, NM, and one of the largest mosaic installations ever created in the US, depicting a “Cosmic Christ” on the front of the First Baptist Church of Huntsville, Alabama. That work took 7 years to complete (1966 to 1973), and is approximately one-third the size of a football field. Approximately 1.4 million pieces of Italian tile - none larger than a man's thumbnail - comprise the mosaic, each piece having been set in place by the artist (in some cases with tweezers). Smith’s final installed work produced at Smith Studios was a stained glass window depicting the story of Noah’s ark commissioned by Cook Children’s Health Care System in Fort Worth, and dedicated in 2003.

Smith Studios also worked in the area of historical restoration, and completed a number of notable projects including the restoration of the Texas & Pacific Terminal in Fort Worth. In 2002, Smith was awarded the Artisans Award by the Texas Society of Architects for Smith Studios’ work in historical restoration.

A retrospective exhibition of Smith’s work in stained glass and sculpture, as well as works on canvas and on paper, was held in 2004 at the University Gallery at Texas Christian University in Fort Worth., He worked as an artist until his death, and his last works on canvas emphasized American Indian themes.

=== Work in Publishing ===
As principal of Smiths, Inc., Gordon Smith published several books in the 1950s, including The Devil Rides Outside, the first novel by Texas author John Howard Griffin, , later noted for his groundbreaking book Black Like Me.

== Family ==
Gordon W. Smith was married, until her death in 1998, to Beverley Taylor Smith, a Fort Worth civic leader, actress, and host in the late 1950s and early 1960s of a local television show, the Ann Alden Show, who was also for many years chairman of the Cliburn Concerts division of the Van Cliburn Foundation. In his late wife’s honor, Smith and his son and daughter, Gordon Dee Smith and Beverley Blaine Smith, have funded the Beverley Taylor Smith Award for the Best Performance of a New Work, which is awarded to a competitor at the Van Cliburn International Piano Competition every four years for the best performance of a new work by an American composer, chosen through the American Composers Invitational of the Van Cliburn Foundation.
