= Liebenwerda Heath =

Coordinates: 51°30′52.32″N 13°31′6.64″E

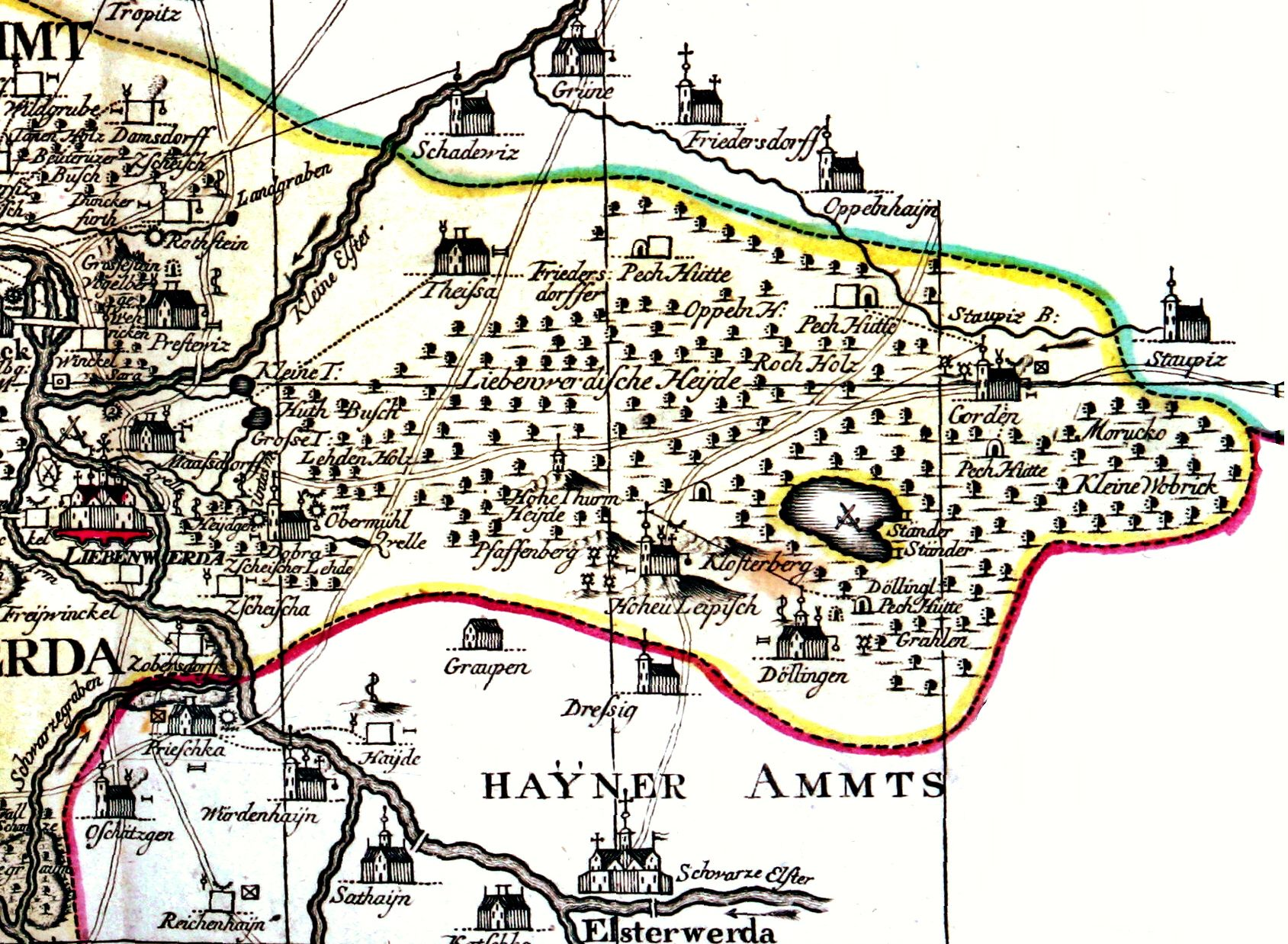
The Liebenwerdaer Amtsheide around 1753

The Liebenwerda Heath (German: Liebenwerdaer Heide), formerly also the Liebenwerda District Heath (Liebenwerdaer Amtsheide), is a forest region in the south of the German state of Brandenburg in Elbe-Elster Land that in earlier times was mainly used for forestry and hunting. It is located east of the spa town of Bad Liebenwerda between the villages of Dobra in the west and Gorden in the east. To the north it extends as far as the village of Oppelhain in the municipality of Rückersdorf and in the south to the northern boundary of Haida. In 1557, the Electoral Saxon mine surveyour (Markscheider) and state land surveyor (Landvermesser), Georg Öder, gave the dimensions of the heath as three miles long and one mile wide.

It was once part of the Margrave Heath (Markgrafenheide) to which large parts of the region between Uebigau and Sonnewalde belonged. On the Liebenwerda Heath was one of the largest contiguous sessile oak forests of Central Europe. Large parts of the terrain were used for decades as a military training area. The Forsthaus Prösa Nature Reserve, which lies on the heath and has an area of 3,695 hectares, is the heart of the Lower Lusatian Heath Nature Park, which covers 484 square kilometres.
