= Gordon Anderson (cricketer) =

New Zealand cricketer (1922–2013)

Personal information
- Full name: Gordon Frank Anderson
- Born: 9 January 1922; Christchurch, New Zealand
- Died: 10 December 2013 (aged 91); Christchurch, New Zealand
- Batting: Right-handed
- Role: Wicket-keeper
- Relatives: Bill Cunningham (uncle)

Domestic team information
- Years: Team
- 1949/50–1950/51: Canterbury

Career statistics
Competition	First-class
Matches	6
Runs scored	67
Batting average	6.70
100s/50s	0/0
Top score	33
Catches/stumpings	10/5
- Source: Cricinfo, 16 January 2026

Gordon Frank Anderson (9 January 1922 – 10 December 2013) was a New Zealand cricketer. He played in six first-class matches for Canterbury between 1949 and 1951.

Anderson was born in Christchurch and attended Christchurch Technical College. He worked as a clerk for Caltex. His uncle was the New Zealand opening bowler Bill Cunningham.

In its review of the 1949–50 Plunket Shield season, The Cricket Almanack of New Zealand said: "G. F. Anderson, a youthful wicketkeeper, made a successful debut v. Otago, in the final match, and Canterbury's wicketkeeping problem now seems solved." However, after the 1950–51 season, when he topped the fielding statistics for the Plunket Shield with eight catches and three stumpings, Anderson played no more first-class cricket. He was replaced as the Canterbury wicketkeeper by Alan Britton, a more successful batsman.
