= Gordon Williams =

Gordon Williams may refer to:

- Gord Williams (born 1960), Canadian ice hockey player
- Gordon Williams (writer) (1934–2017), Scottish author
- Gordon Williams (footballer) (1929–2002), English footballer
- Gordon E. Williams (born 1935), U.S. Air Force officer
- Gordon "Commissioner Gordon" Williams, American record producer, audio engineer, and mixer
