= Gordon Wood =

Gordon Wood may refer to:

- Gordon S. Wood (1933–2026), American historian
- Gordon Wood (American football) (1914–2003), high school football coach in Texas
- Gordon Eric Wood, Australian jailed then acquitted of the murder of Caroline Byrne
- Gordon Wood (rugby union) (1931–1982), rugby union footballer

== See also ==
- Gordon Woods (1952–2009), veterinary scientist
