= Aaron Gordon (disambiguation) =

Aaron Gordon is an American professional basketball player.

Aaron Gordon may also refer to:

- Robert Aaron Gordon (1908–1978), American economist
- A. D. Gordon (Aaron David Gordon, 1856–1922), Labour Zionist thinker and the spiritual force behind practical Zionism and Labor Zionism
