= Gorden-Staupitz =

- Municipality
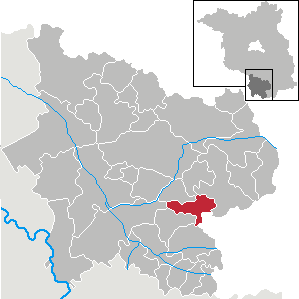
- Location of Gorden-Staupitz within Elbe-Elster district
- Interactive map of Gorden-Staupitz
- Location within Germany Location within Brandenburg
- Coordinates: 51°32′3″N 13°37′44″E
- Country: Germany
- State: Brandenburg
- District: Elbe-Elster
- Municipal assoc.: Plessa
- Subdivisions: 2 Ortsteile

Government
  - Mayor (2024–29): Enrico Schiemang

Area
  - Total: 28.38 km^{2} (10.96 sq mi)
- Elevation: 103 m (338 ft)

Population (2025-12-31)
  - Total: 904
  - Density: 31.9/km^{2} (82.5/sq mi)
- Time zone: UTC+01:00 (CET)
  - Summer (DST): UTC+02:00 (CEST)
- Postal codes: 03238
- Dialling codes: 035325
- Vehicle registration: EE, FI, LIB

Gorden-Staupitz is a municipality in the Elbe-Elster district, in Brandenburg, Germany.

== History ==
From 1952 to 1990, the constituent localities of Gorden-Staupitz were part of the Bezirk Cottbus of East Germany. On 31 December 2001, the municipality of Gorden-Staupitz was formed by merging the municipalities of Gorden and Staupitz.

== Demography ==
Development of Population since 1875 within the Current Boundaries (Blue Line: Population; Dotted Line: Comparison to Population Development of Brandenburg state; Grey Background: Time of Nazi rule; Red Background: Time of Communist rule)

Gorden-Staupitz: Population development
within the current boundaries (2017)

| Year | Pop. | ±% p.a. |
|---|---|---|
| 1875 | 931 | — |
| 1890 | 1,052 | +0.82% |
| 1910 | 1,196 | +0.64% |
| 1925 | 1,334 | +0.73% |
| 1933 | 1,364 | +0.28% |
| 1939 | 1,429 | +0.78% |
| 1946 | 1,850 | +3.76% |
| 1950 | 1,785 | −0.89% |
| 1964 | 1,586 | −0.84% |
| 1971 | 1,520 | −0.61% |
| 1981 | 1,385 | −0.93% |
| 1985 | 1,372 | −0.24% |
| 1989 | 1,338 | −0.63% |
| 1990 | 1,311 | −2.02% |

| Year | Pop. | ±% p.a. |
|---|---|---|
| 1991 | 1,295 | −1.22% |
| 1992 | 1,300 | +0.39% |
| 1993 | 1,278 | −1.69% |
| 1994 | 1,255 | −1.80% |
| 1995 | 1,248 | −0.56% |
| 1996 | 1,244 | −0.32% |
| 1997 | 1,242 | −0.16% |
| 1998 | 1,241 | −0.08% |
| 1999 | 1,219 | −1.77% |
| 2000 | 1,214 | −0.41% |
| 2001 | 1,209 | −0.41% |
| 2002 | 1,199 | −0.83% |
| 2003 | 1,188 | −0.92% |
| 2004 | 1,181 | −0.59% |

| Year | Pop. | ±% p.a. |
|---|---|---|
| 2005 | 1,148 | −2.79% |
| 2006 | 1,128 | −1.74% |
| 2007 | 1,101 | −2.39% |
| 2008 | 1,085 | −1.45% |
| 2009 | 1,080 | −0.46% |
| 2010 | 1,059 | −1.94% |
| 2011 | 1,044 | −1.42% |
| 2012 | 1,016 | −2.68% |
| 2013 | 987 | −2.85% |
| 2014 | 972 | −1.52% |
| 2015 | 957 | −1.54% |
| 2016 | 955 | −0.21% |
| 2017 | 954 | −0.10% |
