= Gordon Thomson =

Gordon Thomson may refer to:

- Gordon Thomson (actor) (born 1945), Canadian actor
- Gordon Thomson (rower) (1884–1953), British rower
- Gordon Thomson (badminton) (born 1985), Scottish badminton player
- Gordon Thomson (Christmas Island politician), civic leader on the Australian external territory of Christmas Island

== See also ==
- Gordon Thompson (disambiguation)
