= Gordon Walker =

Gordon Walker may refer to:

- Gordon Walker (businessman) (born 1941), Canadian businessman and former politician
- Gordie Walker (born 1965), Canadian former professional ice hockey player
- Gordon Beverly Walker (1891–1954), Canadian politician and Alberta MLA from 1926 to 1935
- Gordon Walker (coach) (born c. 1983), New Zealand canoeing coach
- Gordon Walker (professor), professor in the Department of Geography at Lancaster University
- Gordon Walker (piper) (born 1967), bagpipe player
- Gordon Walker (priest) (died 1916), Dean of Achonry
- Gordon Walker, a fictional character from the American television series Supernatural
- Gordon Walker (rugby union), Australian international rugby union player

== See also ==
- Patrick Gordon Walker (1907–1980), British Labour Party politician
- Thomas Gordon Walker (1849–1917), British Indian civil servant
