= Gordon, Alaska =

Unincorporated community in the state of Alaska, United States

Gordon
- Unincorporated community
- Location within the state of Alaska
- Coordinates: 69°40′48″N 141°12′21″W
- Country: United States
- State: Alaska
- Borough: North Slope

Government
  - Borough mayor: Josiah Patkotak
  - State senator: Donny Olson (D)
  - State rep.: Dean Westlake (D)
- Elevation: 13 ft (4 m)
- Time zone: UTC-9 (Alaska (AKST))
  - Summer (DST): UTC-8 (AKDT)
- Area code: 907

Gordon (or, in Inupiaq, Pattaktuq, meaning “he/she/it is spanking”, alluding to the pounding of the waves on the shore, as though it is being spanked by someone; also Demarcation) was a former fur trading post in North Slope Borough, Alaska, United States on the shore of Demarcation Bay, near the Canadian border in the east. It is located approximately 200 miles (320 km) north of the Arctic Circle, 2.5 miles (4.0 km) east of Demarcation Point and 65 miles (105 km) east of Kaktovik. It was one of the many trading outposts established along the north coast of Alaska in the early 20th century.

== History ==
The place was named after Thomas Gordon, a Scottish whaler and trader who was sent by Charles Brower to Demarcation Point in 1917 to establish the post for the fur trading company H.B. Liebes Company of San Francisco. He founded the settlement with the help of Andrew Akootchook, his brother-in-law, and moved there with his wife and their families. After Gordon and his wife's family later moved to Barter Island, his son Mickey took over the trading post and continued to run it until the late 1920s.

The construction of the DEW line in the 1950s affected the appearance of the site. Excessive removal of gravel caused the spit at Demarcation Point, which used to extend further into the bay, to retreat; consequently, the houses on the spit were washed away due to beach erosion. Since then, fishing has not been as good.

Many Inuit and Dene people from the region frequently visited the place. The Athabascans regularly came here from the south and were involved in trading. The area around the trading post was, and still is today, a good fishing, hunting and camping site. Especially oldsquaws, caribous and polar bears were hunted at Demarcation Bay. Additionally, it occasionally serves as a stopover for people from Kaktovik taking boat trips to Canada to visit friends and relatives.
