= Gordon C. S. Smith =

British academic (born 1965)

Gordon Campbell Sinclair Smith (born 1965) FRCOG FMedSc is a British academic, professor of Obstetrics and Gynaecology and Honorary Consultant in Maternal-Fetal medicine. Since 2004 he has been the Head of Department of Obstetrics and Gynaecology at University of Cambridge.

== Education ==
Smith's education include a BSc Physiology (1987), Bachelor of Medicine MB ChB (1990), PhD (2001) and DSc (2012) from University of Glasgow.

== Awards and honours ==
Smith became Honorary Consultant in Maternal-Fetal Medicine of the Addenbrooke's NHS trust in 2001. He was then elected a Fellow of the Royal College of Obstetricians and Gynaecologists (FRCOG) in 2008 and a Fellow of the Academy of Medical Sciences (FMedSci) in 2010.
