= Justice Gordon =

Justice Gordon may refer to:

- Frank Gordon Jr. (1929–2020), associate justice of the Arizona Supreme Court
- Isaac G. Gordon (1819–1893), associate justice and chief justice of the Supreme Court of Pennsylvania
- Sir John Hannah Gordon (1850–1923), judge of the Supreme Court of South Australia
- Merritt J. Gordon (1859–1925), associate justice of the Washington Supreme Court
- Michelle Gordon (born 1964), justice of the High Court of Australia
- Myron L. Gordon (1918–2009), associate justice of the Wisconsin Supreme Court
- Peyton Gordon (1870–1946), associate justice of the District Court of the United States for the District of Columbia
- Thomas C. Gordon (1915–2003), associate justice of the Supreme Court of Appeals of Virginia
- Thomas Gordon (lawyer) (1652–1722), chief justice of the New Jersey Supreme Court

== See also ==
- Judge Gordon (disambiguation)
