= Gordon V. Thompson =

Publisher and songwriter

Gordon Thompson
- Born: Gordon Vincent Thompson; 9 August 1888; Humberstone, Ontario
- Died: 12 May 1965 (aged 76); Toronto
- Occupations: Songwriter and publisher

"Do Your Bit" (1915) was performed by the popular baritone Hugh Ruthven MacDonald

Gordon Vincent Thompson (1888–1965) was a Canadian composer of patriotic and religious songs. He founded the Thompson Publishing Company in 1911 and the Authors and Composers Association of Canada in 1918. He then sold his business to Leo Feist and worked for them until 1932 when he started his own company again – Gordon V. Thompson Ltd. (The second company was acquired by Warner Chappell Music in 1990.)

His work included:

- "When Jack Comes Back" (1915)
- "Where Is My Boy Tonight?" (1915)
- "Red Cross Nell and Khaki Jim" (1916)
- "When We Wind Up the Watch on the Rhine" (1917)
- "Heroes of the Flag (the New Veteran’s Song)" (1917)
- "For the Glory of the Grand Old Flag" (1918)
- "You Are Welcome Back at Home, Sweet Home" (1919)
- "Quintuplets' Lullaby" (1935)
- "In an Eastern Canadian Port" (1944)
- "Jesus is Lord" (1956)
