= The Investment Answer =

- Author: Daniel C. Goldie, CFA, CFP and Gordon S. Murray
- Language: English
- Genre: Investment
- Publisher: Hachette Book Group (2011)
- Publication date: January 25, 2011
- Publication place: United States
- Media type: Hardcover, paperback, audiobook, eBook, Kindle
- Pages: 96
- ISBN: 978-1-4555-0330-8
- LC Class: 2010942432

The Investment Answer, Learn to Manage Your Money & Protect Your Financial Future is a No.1 New York Times bestselling book for individual investors by Daniel C. Goldie, CFA, CFP and Gordon S. Murray. It was first released in paperback in 2010, and later published in hardcover in 2011. It is 96 pages long.

Gordon Murray, who died as a result of glioblastoma on January 15, 2011, chose to co-write the book in the time he had remaining. Murray had worked in institutional trading and sales at Goldman Sachs, Credit Suisse First Boston and Lehman Brothers. He retired from Wall Street in 2002.

Daniel Goldie is a fee-only registered investment advisor based in Menlo Park, California.

The book is designed around five investor decisions.

1. The do-it-yourself decision
2. The asset allocation decision
3. The diversification decision
4. The active vs. passive decision
5. The rebalancing decision

The book is a general guide to investment and gives fundamental explanations in each chapter. The first chapter deals with using brokers. Chapter two touches on asset allocation, explaining the relationship between risk and return. Chapter three gives a basic explanation of diversification (having a mix of assets in a portfolio). Chapter four discusses active investing versus passive investing. Chapter five is about rebalancing a portfolio. Chapter six discusses how to gauge the performance of a portfolio. Chapter seven touches on hedge funds, private equity and commodities.

== Key principles of the book ==
1. The global capitalist system generates a positive return on capital over time.
2. Investing broadly and cheaply in global capital markets with asset class funds and index funds is a winning strategy over the long term because global capital market returns are available to everyone overall.
3. With a proper time horizon and discipline, investors can capture global capital market returns which should beat most active investors (who try to beat the market) with less risk.
4. The most effective and efficient way to invest in stocks and bonds is in public equity and debt markets.
5. Stock picking and market timing are speculation, while asset allocation, broad diversification of portfolio risk, reducing costs and staying the course are investing.

== Reviews ==
The book has received positive reviews in The New York Times, National Public Radio, the Journal of Financial Planning, Morningstar Advisor, and The Huffington Post.
