= Gorden =

Gorden is an English variant of Gordon. Notable people with the name include:

given name;

- Gorden Kaye, English actor
- Gorden Kelley, American football player
- Gorden Moyo, Zimbabwean politician
- Gorden Tallis, Australian rugby player
- Gorden Wagener, chief design officer for Daimler AG

surname

- Greg Gorden, American game designer
- Sarah Gorden, American soccer player
