= List of windmills in Brandenburg =

A list of windmills in the German state of Brandenburg.

Location	Name of mill	Type	Built	Notes	Photograph
Altbelgern		Bockwindmühle		Restored; Muehlen Archiv (in German)	
Altdöbern		Turmholländer		Stump; Muehlen Archiv (in German)	
Althüttendorf		Bockwindmühle		Preserved; Muehlen Archiv (in German)	
Altlandsberg		Sockelgeschoßholländer		House conversion Muehlen Archiv (in German)	
Baek-Steinberg		Turmholländer		Muehlen Archiv (in German)	
Bamme		Bockwindmühle		Restored; Muehlen Archiv (in German)	
Baruth/Mark	Bockmühle Baruth	Bockwindmühle		House conversion Muehlen Archiv (in German)	
Baruth/Mark		Sockelgeschoßholländer		Muehlen Archiv (in German)	
Beelitz	Beelitzer Bockwindmühle	Bockwindmühle	1792	Restored; Muehlen Archiv (in German) Wikimedia Commons	
Beeskow		Bockwindmühle		Incorporated into engine driven mill Muehlen Archiv (in German)	
Beiersdorf	Beiersdorfer Windmühle	Bockwindmühle		Muehlen Archiv (in German)	
Blesendorf		Bockwindmühle		Collapsed remains only Muehlen Archiv (in German)	
Blönsdorf	Blönsdorfer Holländermühle	Turmholländer		Muehlen Archiv (in German)	
Blönsdorf-Mellndorf		Bockwindmühle		Restored; Muehlen Archiv (in German)	
Borne		Bockwindmühle		Restored; Muehlen Archiv (in German)	
Bötzow		Bockwindmühle		Derelict; Muehlen Archiv (in German)	
Brandenburg-Plaue		Bockwindmühle		Few remains Muehlen Archiv (in German)	
Bredereiche		Turmhöllander		Muehlen Archiv (in German)	
Bückwitz		Bockwindmühle		Derelict; Muehlen Archiv (in German)	
Calau		Bockwindmühle		Incorporated into engine driven mill Muehlen Archiv (in German)	
Calau		Bockwindmühle		Restored; Muehlen Archiv (in German)	
Cammer		Bockwindmühle		Restored; Muehlen Archiv (in German)	
Cammer		Turmholländer		Incorporated into engine driven mill Muehlen Archiv (in German)	
Dahme		Bockwindmühle		Muehlen Archiv (in German)	
Dennewitz	Dennewitzer Windmühle	Bockwindmühle		Restored; Muehlen Archiv (in German)	
Doberlug-Kirchhain		Bockwindmühle		Incorporated into engine driven mill Muehlen Archiv (in German)	
Drasdo		Bockwindmühle		Muehlen Archiv (in German)	
Dubro		Turmholländer		Muehlen Archiv (in German)	
Eichholz		Paltrokmühle		Muehlen Archiv (in German)	
Eichstedt-Wollin		Bockwindmühle		Trestle and collapsed remains of mill only Muehlen Archiv (in German)	
Elsterwerda		Bockwindmühle		Restored; Muehlen Archiv (in German)	
Fahrland		Bockwindmühle		Restored; Muehlen Archiv (in German)	
Falkenberg	Falkenberger Windmühle	Bockwindmühle	1853	Muehlen Archiv (in German)	
Falkenberg		Paltrockmühle		Incorporated into engine driven mill Muehlen Archiv (in German)	
Flieth	Fliether Windmühle	Bockwindmühle		Trestle and collapsed remains only Muehlen Archiv (in German)	
Freiwalde	Freiwalder Windmühle	Bockwindmühle		Muehlen Archiv (in German)	
Freyenstein		Turmholländer		Muehlen Archiv (in German)	
Friedland, Brandenburg		Turmholländer		Muehlen Archiv (in German)	
Fünfeichen		Turmholländer		Muehlen Archiv (in German)	
Fürstenwalde		Turmholländer		Muehlen Archiv (in German)	
Fürstenwerder		Turmholländer		Muehlen Archiv (in German)	
Gablenz		Bockwindmühle		Muehlen Archiv (in German)	
Giesendorf-Wulfersdorf		Bockwindmühle		Muehlen Archiv (in German)	
Göritz		Sockelgeschoßholländer		Muehlen Archiv (in German)	
Görsdorf		Bockwindmühle		Incorporated into engine driven mill Muehlen Archiv (in German)	
Gosda-Zwietow		Bockwindmühle		Incorporated into engine driven mill Muehlen Archiv (in German)	
Goyatz	Goyatzer Windmühle	Bockwindmühle		Muehlen Archiv (in German)	
Grassau, Brandenburg	Grassauer Windmühle	Paltrockmühle		Muehlen Archiv (in German)	
Greiffenberg		Erdholländer		Derelict; Muehlen Archiv (in German)	
Groß Leine		Turmholländer		House conversion Muehlen Archiv (in German)	
Groß-Lüben		Galerieholländer		Muehlen Archiv (in German)	
Groß-Marzehns		Turmholländer		Muehlen Archiv (in German)	
Großräschen-Dörrwalde		Turmholländer		Derelict; Muehlen Archiv (in German)	
Großthiemig		Turmholländer		Muehlen Archiv (in German)	
Groß Ziethen		Erdholländer		Incorporated into engine driven mill Muehlen Archiv (in German)	
Grünefeld		Paltrockmühle		Collapsed remains only Muehlen Archiv (in German)	
Hammer		Sockelgeschoßholländer		House conversion Muehlen Archiv (in German)	
Haseloff	Drachenwindmühle Haseloff	Turmholländer	1894	Restored; Muehlen Archiv (in German),Wikimedia Commons	
Herzberg		Turmholländer		Muehlen Archiv (in German)	
Hohenbrück	Hohenbrücker Windmühle	Bockwindmühle		House conversion Muehlen Archiv (in German)	
Hohensaaten		Bockwindmühle		House conversion Muehlen Archiv (in German)	
Hohenselchow		Bockwindmühle		Derelict; Muehlen Archiv (in German)	
Hornow		Bockwindmühle		Incorporated into engine driven mill Muehlen Archiv (in German)	
Illmersdorf		Bockwindmühle		Derelict; Muehlen Archiv (in German)	
Jagow		Bockwindmühle		Derelict; Muehlen Archiv (in German)	
Kauxdorf		Turmholländer	1889	Derelict; Muehlen Archiv (in German)	
Ketzin-Paretz		Bockwindmühle		Family residence House conversion Muehlen Archiv (in German)	
Ketzür		Bockwindmühle		Restored; Muehlen Archiv (in German)	
Klüß		Sockelgeschoßholländer		Derelict; Muehlen Archiv (in German)	
Kohlsdorf		Bockwindmühle		Derelict; Muehlen Archiv (in German)	
Kolpien		Erdholländer		Muehlen Archiv (in German)	
Kölsa		Bockwindmühle		Trestle and floor of mill remain Muehlen Archiv (in German)	
Kosilenzien		Paltrockmühle		Derelict; Muehlen Archiv (in German)	
Koßdorf		Turmholländer		Restored; Muehlen Archiv (in German)	
Langengrassau		Bockwindmühle		Derelict; Muehlen Archiv (in German)	
Langerwisch		Paltrockmühle		Restored; Muehlen Archiv (in German)	
Langerwisch		Bockwindmühle		Winded by a fantail, restored Muehlen Archiv (in German)	
Langerwisch		Bockwindmühle		Derelict; Muehlen Archiv (in German)	
Lebusa		Bockwindmühle		Restored; Muehlen Archiv (in German)	
Lobbese		Bockwindmühle		Trestle only Muehlen Archiv (in German)	
Lübben	Lübbener Windmühle	Bockwindmühle		Burnt down 1934	
Luckau	Luckauer Windmühle	Paltrockmühle / Bockwindmühle		Converted from a paltrok mill to a post mill. Muehlen Archiv (in German)	
Luckow		Bockwindmühle		Muehlen Archiv (in German)	
Lütkendorf		Sockelgeschoßholländer		Incorporated into engine driven mill Muehlen Archiv (in German)	
Marzahna	Bockwindmühle Marzahna	Bockwindmühle	1828	Muehlen Archiv (in German)	
Massen		Turmholländer		Stump only Muehlen Archiv (in German)	
Merzdorf		Bockwindmühle		Muehlen Archiv (in German)	
Michendorf	Michendorfer Holländermühle	Turmholländer		Muehlen Archiv (in German)	
Neuruppin		Sockelgeschoßholländer		Incorporated into engine driven mill Muehlen Archiv (in German)	
Niedergörsdorf	Niedergörsdorfer Windmühle	Bockwindmühle		Muehlen Archiv (in German)	
Niedergörsdorf-Gölsdorf	Gölsdorfer Windmühle	Bockwindmühle		Restored; Muehlen Archiv (in German)	
Niedergörsdorf-Kaltenborn	Kaltenborner Windmühle	Bockwindmühle		Derelict; Muehlen Archiv (in German)	
Niemegk	Wildenhains Mühle	Sockelgeschoßholländer	1880	Base only Muehlen Archiv (in German)	
Niemegk	Fläming Mühle	Turmholländer	1906	Muehlen Archiv (in German) images on Wikimedia Commons	
Niemerlang		Erdholländer		Derelict; Muehlen Archiv (in German)	
Niendorf		Bockwindmühle		Derelict; Muehlen Archiv (in German)	
Nudow		Bockwindmühle		Incorporated into engine driven mill Muehlen Archiv (in German)	
Oppelhain		Paltrockmühle		German Wikipedia article	
Petkus		Paltrockmühle		Restored; Muehlen Archiv (in German)	
Potsdam		Galerieholländer		Muehlen Archiv (in German)	
Potsdam Babelsberg	Mühlenberg / Babertsberg (Babelsberg)	Holländerwindmühle	1753	Burnt down and demolished 1848. Flatowturm built on site in 1856	
Potsdam Schiffbauergasse	Zichorienmühle	Holländerwindmühle		House converted c1860	
Prietzen		Bockwindmühle		Restored Muehlen Archiv (in German)	
Raddusch		Bockwindmühle		Trestle only Muehlen Archiv (in German)	
Reppinichen		Bockwindmühle		Derelict; Muehlen Archiv (in German)	
Reppinichen		Bockwindmühle		Derelict; Muehlen Archiv (in German)	
Rheinsberg		Turmholländer		Muehlen Archiv (in German)	
Rosenthal		Turmholländer		Muehlen Archiv (in German)	
Saalow	Paltrockmühle Saalow	Paltrockmühle		Restored; Muehlen Archiv (in German)	
Saalow	Scheunenwindmühle	Scheunenwindmühle	1864	Restored; Kulturportal Brandenburg (in German)	
Schiebsdorf		Bockwindmühle		Derelict; Muehlen Archiv (in German)	
Schönerlinde		Bockwindmühle		House conversion Muehlen Archiv (in German)	
Schönewalde	Paltrockmühle Schönewalde	Paltrockmühle	1820	Restored; Muehlen Archiv (in German)	
Sielow		Turmholländer		Muehlen Archiv (in German)	
Stechau		Bockwindmühle		Derelict; Muehlen Archiv (in German)	
Straupitz		Turmholländer		Muehlen Archiv (in German)	
Strohdehne		Bockwindmühle		House conversion Muehlen Archiv (in German)	
Tauche		Bockwindmühle		Muehlen Archiv (in German)	
Tauer	Windmühle Tauer	Bockwindmühle		Derelict; Muehlen Archiv (in German)	
Teltow	Teltower Windmühle	Bockwindmühle		Muehlen Archiv (in German)	
Telz	Telzer Holländermühle	Sockelgeschoßholländer		Muehlen Archiv (in German)	
Tempelburg		Turmholländer		House conversion Muehlen Archiv (in German)	
Trebbus		Bockwindmühle		Restored; Muehlen Archiv (in German)	
Trebbus-Lichtena		Bockwindmühle		Muehlen Archiv (in German)	
Treuenbrietzen	Brendels Mühle	Turmholländer		Muehlen Archiv (in German),Wikimedia Commons	
Turnow		Turmholländer		Incorporated into engine driven mill Muehlen Archiv (in German)	
Vehlefanz		Bockwindmühle		Restored; Muehlen Archiv (in German)	
Wahlsdorf		Bockwindmühle		House conversion Muehlen Archiv (in German)	
Wehrhain		Erdholländer		Muehlen Archiv (in German)	
Weisen		Erdholländer		Muehlen Archiv (in German)	
Werder		Bockwindmühle		Restored; Muehlen Archiv (in German)	
Werder (Petzow)		Turmholländer		Muehlen Archiv (in German)	
Werder		Bockwindmühle		Muehlen Archiv (in German)	
Wiederau		Bockwindmühle		Muehlen Archiv (in German)	
Wilhelmsaue		Bockwindmühle		Restored; Muehlen Archiv (in German)	
Wollschow		Bockwindmühle		Remains only Muehlen Archiv (in German)	
Wormlage		Bockwindmühle		Trestle only Muehlen Archiv (in German)	
Wormlage		Bockwindmühle		Trestle only Muehlen Archiv (in German)	
Wusterwitz		Turmholländer		Muehlen Archiv (in German)	Windmill in Wusterwitz
Wusterwitz		Turmholländer		Muehlen Archiv (in German)	Windmill in Wusterwitz
Zagelsdorf		Bockwindmühle		Trestle only Muehlen Archiv (in German)	
Zerkwitz		Turmholländer		Incorporated into engine driven mill Muehlen Archiv (in German)	
Zichow		Turmholländer		Muehlen Archiv (in German)	
