= Christian August Pohlenz =

German composer and conductor

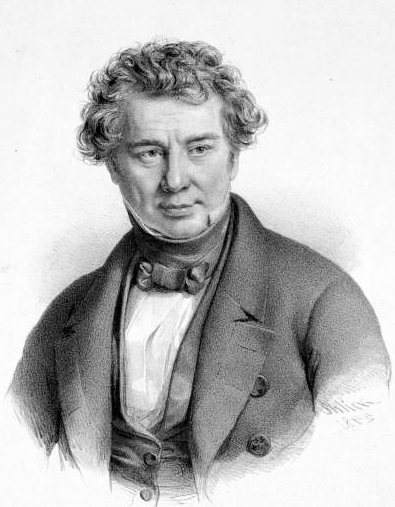
- Born: 3 July 1790; Sallgast
- Died: 10 March 1843 (aged 52); Leipzig

Christian August Pohlenz (3 July 1790 – 10 March 1843) was a German composer and conductor.

Pohlenz was born in Sallgast. He was Gewandhaus Kapellmeister from 1827 to 1835. He died in Leipzig.
