= Luckow =

Luckow may refer to:

- Luckow, Mecklenburg-Vorpommern
- Luckow, Brandenburg, a windmill in Brandenburg
