= Telz =

Telz may refer to:

- Telšiai (Yiddish: Telz), a city in Lithuania
- Telz (crater), on Mars
- Telz (producer), a Nigerian producer
- Telz, Brandenburg, a town in Germany; see List of windmills in Brandenburg
- Telshe Yeshiva, in Wickliffe, Ohio
- Telshe Yeshiva (Chicago)
