= Groden =

Groden may refer to:

- Groden, an alternative name for a polder
- Gröden, a village in Brandenburg, Germany
- Robert J. Groden, American author and photographic specialist
