= Edwin Zimmermann =

German engineer and politician (1948–2024)

- Born: 15 August 1948; Dahme, Brandenburg, East Germany
- Died: 1 October 2024 (aged 76); Cottbus, Brandenburg, Germany
- Education: Polytechnic Secondary School, East Berlin
- Occupations: Engineer; Politician
- Political party: SPD
- Spouse: Christel John
- Children: 1 daughter

Edwin Zimmermann (15 August 1948 – 1 October 2024) was a German engineer and politician who was a member of the Social Democratic Party of Germany (SPD).

After the German reunification, between November 1990 and December 1997, he was regional Minister of Food, Agriculture and Forestry in Brandenburg. His name hit the headlines in 1997 over the "Bake-oven affair" which ended his ministerial career and eventually, in 2004, left him with an eleven-month suspended sentence for "Subsidy Fraud" ("Subventionsbetrug").

== Life and career ==
=== Early years ===
Edwin Zimmermann was born in the Schöna district of Dahme, some 100 km (62 miles) south of Berlin in the Soviet occupation zone of what had been Germany, a region which was by now becoming the German Democratic Republic (East Germany). His parents were farmers. He attended the Polytechnic Secondary School in nearby Hohenbucko and then undertook an apprenticeship as a tractor and agricultural machinery mechanic at the Science and Technical Centre (WTZ) in Schlieben. He worked as a mechanic in 1967/68 before undertaking his military service in 1968/69.

=== Agriculture industry ===
Between 1969 and 1970 Zimmermann worked as a lathe operator with the PGH Agricultural Machinery factory in Dahme and then in 1970 was briefly employed in an administrative function with the local police in Herzberg District. In 1970–71 Zimmermann worked as a mechanic with the Agricultural Production Cooperative (LPG) in Schöna and then as a master craftsman for spinning technology in yarn machinery production between 1972 and 1975.

He then returned to education, undertaking an engineering course in Berlin in 1974–75. From 1975 he attended the Engineering College in Friesack, emerging in 1978 with an Engineering Degree in Agricultural Technology.

From 1976 till 1990 Zimmermann was in charge of transport and Materials Logistics at the Agro-technical Centre in Hohenseefeld.

1990 was the year in which everything changed for East Germany, and Zimmermann entered politics at this time. However, he retired from politics in 1998 and became an independent business consultant. From December 1999 till 2004 he served as President of the Regional Sports League in Brandenburg.

=== Politics ===
The succession of events leading to German reunification can be dated from November 1989 when the wall through Berlin was breached, and this was also the month in which Zimmermann participated in the refounding of the SPD in Dahme and in the surrounding Luchau district. In April 1990 he became chairman of the party's regional board in Cottbus, and at the same time he was elected deputy SPD party chairman for Brandenburg. On 1 November 1990, after German reunification had become a reality, he was appointed Minister for Food, Agriculture and Forestry for Brandenburg, in the regional government headed up by Manfred Stolpe.

He became a member of the Brandenburg Regional Assembly (Landtag) on 19 March 1992 when he took over the seat of Gustav Just following the latter's resignation. In 1994 and 1999 he was re-elected to the assembly, representing the "Dahme-Spreewald II" electoral district. In the assembly he was, following his ministerial resignation, a member of the Committee on Food, Agriculture and Forestry between 1997 and 1999. From 1999 till 2004 he was a member of the Committee for Education, Youth and Sport and also of the Committee for European Affairs and Development policy.

=== Bake-oven affair ===
Allegations of bad faith and cheating were made against Zimmermann in connection with the so-called "Bake-oven affair", over which he resigned his ministerial office on 14 November 1997. The controversy involved the allocation of European Union Support grants and contracts allocated during his time in office, of which approximately €244,000 had gone to a Job creation project for a commercial "Show-bakery" and its new industrial-scale wood-fueled oven. However, the Show-bakery in question was the Zimmermann family bakery, run by Zimmermann's wife, brother and daughter. Early in 1998 the Brandenburg regional government demanded a partial repayment of the subsidy.

At the end of 1998 the Potsdam district prosecutor launched proceedings against Zimmermann, alleging "Deception and Subsidy Fraud" ("Untreue und Subventionsbetrug"). The former minister's offices were searched, but he firmly rejected the charges. The trial was initially dropped, but proceedings were restarted in Summer 2000. On 22 February 2002 Zimmermann, together with two other defendants, was acquitted by the Potsdam District Court. The Prosecutor appealed the verdict, however, and at a further hearing that ended in April 2003 the acquittal was revoked. In February 2004, after a further trial lasting fifteen days, the Potsdam District Court gave Zimmermann an eleven-month suspended sentence and ordered him to pay €5,000 to a charitable organisation. On 16 June 2005, the Federal Court upheld the conviction and rejected Zimmermann's appeal.

=== Death ===
Zimmermann died in Cottbus, Brandenburg on 1 October 2024, at the age of 76.
