= Hirschfeld, Brandenburg =

Hirschfeld
- Municipality
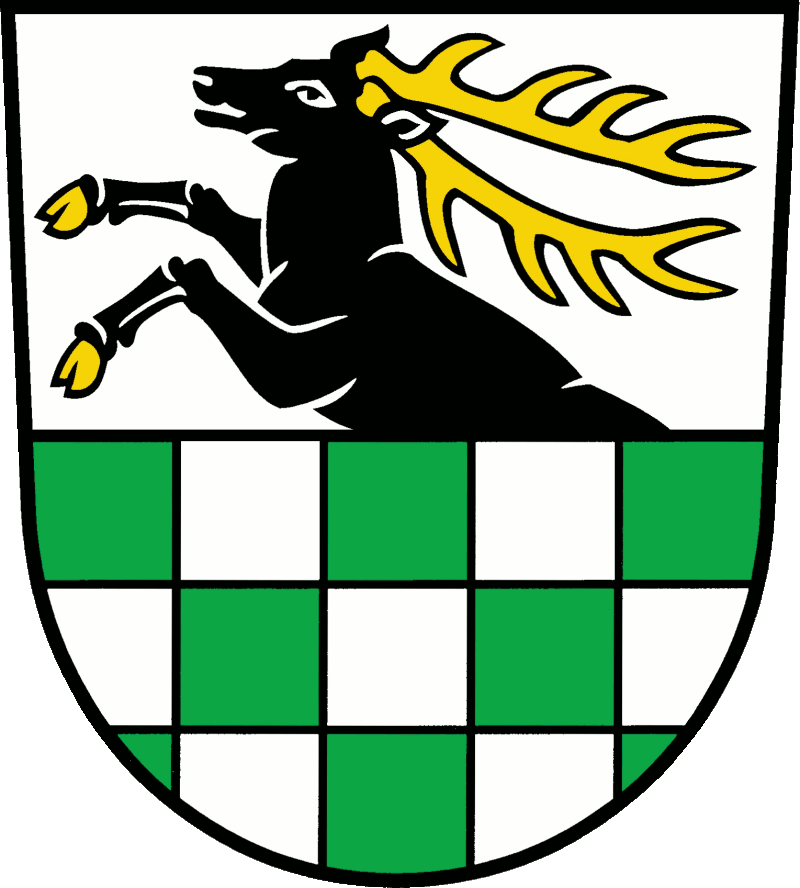
- Coat of arms

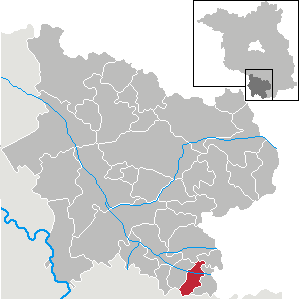
- Location of Hirschfeld within Elbe-Elster district
- Interactive map of Hirschfeld
- Location within Germany Location within Brandenburg
- Coordinates: 51°22′59″N 13°37′00″E
- Country: Germany
- State: Brandenburg
- District: Elbe-Elster
- Municipal assoc.: Schradenland

Government
  - Mayor (2024–29): Ivonne Haase

Area
  - Total: 20.46 km^{2} (7.90 sq mi)
- Elevation: 100 m (330 ft)

Population (2025-12-31)
  - Total: 1,155
  - Density: 56.45/km^{2} (146.2/sq mi)
- Time zone: UTC+01:00 (CET)
  - Summer (DST): UTC+02:00 (CEST)
- Postal codes: 04932
- Dialling codes: 035343
- Vehicle registration: EE, FI, LIB
- Website: www.hirschfeld-im-schraden.de

Hirschfeld (German pronunciation: [ˈhɪʁʃfɛlt]) is a municipality in the Elbe-Elster district, in Brandenburg, Germany.

== History ==
From 1952 to 1990, Hirschfeld was part of the Bezirk Cottbus of East Germany.

== Demography ==
Development of Population since 1875 within the Current Boundaries (Blue Line: Population; Dotted Line: Comparison to Population Development of Brandenburg state; Grey Background: Time of Nazi rule; Red Background: Time of Communist rule)

Hirschfeld [Brandenburg]: Population development within the current boundaries (2013)

Year	Population
1875	1 000
1890	1 000
1910	1 100
1925	1 142
1933	1 211
1939	1 185
1946	1 588
1950	1 571
1964	1 501
1971	1 547

Year	Population
1981	1 613
1985	1 603
1989	1 613
1990	1 578
1991	1 588
1992	1 568
1993	1 555
1994	1 548
1995	1 561
1996	1 562

Year	Population
1997	1 540
1998	1 544
1999	1 539
2000	1 520
2001	1 510
2002	1 484
2003	1 460
2004	1 471
2005	1 456
2006	1 435

Year	Population
2007	1 433
2008	1 410
2009	1 394
2010	1 367
2011	1 344
2012	1 351
2013	1 321
2014	1 298
2015	1 279
2016	1 254
