= Amt Schlieben =

Schlieben
- Amt
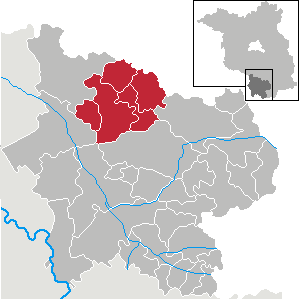
- Map of Elbe-Elster highlighting Schlieben
- Interactive map of Schlieben
- Location within Germany Location within Brandenburg
- Coordinates: 51°43′N 13°23′E
- Country: Germany
- State: Brandenburg
- District: Elbe-Elster
- Seat: Schlieben
- Subdivisions: 5 municipalities

Area
  - Total: 210.83 km^{2} (81.40 sq mi)

Population (2025-12-31)
  - Total: 5,076
  - Density: 24.08/km^{2} (62.36/sq mi)
- Time zone: UTC+01:00 (CET)
  - Summer (DST): UTC+02:00 (CEST)
- Website: www.amt-schlieben.de

Amt Schlieben is an Amt ("collective municipality") in the district of Elbe-Elster, in Brandenburg, Germany. Its seat is in Schlieben.

The Amt Schlieben consists of the following municipalities:

1. Fichtwald
2. Hohenbucko
3. Kremitzaue
4. Lebusa
5. Schlieben

== Demography ==
Development of Population since 1875 within the Current Boundaries (Blue Line: Population; Dotted Line: Comparison to Population Development of Brandenburg state; Grey Background: Time of Nazi rule; Red Background: Time of Communist rule)

Recent Population Development and Projections (Population Development before Census 2011 (blue line); Recent Population Development according to the Census in Germany in 2011 (blue bordered line); Official projections for 2005-2030 (yellow line); for 2017-2030 (scarlet line); for 2020-2030 (green line)

Amt Schlieben: Population development
within the current boundaries (2020)

Year	Pop.	±% p.a.
1875	6,874	—
1890	6,746	−0.13%
1910	6,470	−0.21%
1925	6,489	+0.02%
1939	6,200	−0.32%
1950	9,957	+4.40%
1964	8,434	−1.18%
1971	8,330	−0.18%
1981	7,658	−0.84%

Year	Pop.	±% p.a.
1985	7,545	−0.37%
1990	7,193	−0.95%
1995	7,164	−0.08%
2000	6,743	−1.20%
2005	6,292	−1.37%
2010	5,779	−1.69%
2015	5,369	−1.46%
2020	5,233	−0.51%
2025	5,076	−0.61%
