= Kremitzaue =

- Municipality
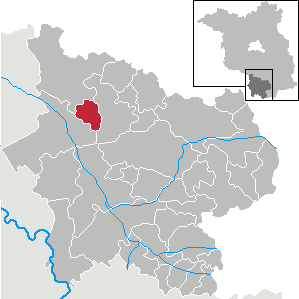
- Location of Kremitzaue within Elbe-Elster district
- Interactive map of Kremitzaue
- Location within Germany Location within Brandenburg
- Coordinates: 51°36′00″N 13°40′00″E
- Country: Germany
- State: Brandenburg
- District: Elbe-Elster
- Municipal assoc.: Schlieben
- Subdivisions: 3 Ortsteile

Government
  - Mayor (2024–29): Reinhard Claus

Area
  - Total: 23.41 km^{2} (9.04 sq mi)
- Elevation: 90 m (300 ft)

Population (2025-12-31)
  - Total: 782
  - Density: 33.4/km^{2} (86.5/sq mi)
- Time zone: UTC+01:00 (CET)
  - Summer (DST): UTC+02:00 (CEST)
- Postal codes: 04936
- Dialling codes: 035361
- Vehicle registration: EE, FI, LIB

Kremitzaue is a municipality in the Elbe-Elster district, in Brandenburg, Germany.

== History ==
From 1815 to 1944, the constituent localities of Kremitzaue were part of the Prussian Province of Saxony. From 1944 to 1945, they were part of the Province of Halle-Merseburg. From 1952 to 1990, they were part of the Bezirk Cottbus of East Germany. On 31 December 2001, the municipality of Kremitzaue was formed by merging the municipalities of Kolochau, Malitschkendorf and Polzen.

== Demography ==
Development of Population since 1875 within the Current Boundaries (Blue Line: Population; Dotted Line: Comparison to Population Development of Brandenburg state; Grey Background: Time of Nazi rule; Red Background: Time of Communist rule)

Kremitzaue: Population development within the current boundaries (2013)

Year	Population
1875	1 060
1890	1 060
1910	1 070
1925	1 067
1933	1 129
1939	1 116
1946	1 532
1950	1 469
1964	1 211
1971	1 194

Year	Population
1981	1 143
1985	1 104
1989	1 028
1990	1 024
1991	1 081
1992	1 114
1993	1 248
1994	1 245
1995	1 238
1996	1 232

Year	Population
1997	1 236
1998	1 247
1999	1 026
2000	1 018
2001	1 021
2002	1 033
2003	1 018
2004	995
2005	989
2006	976

Year	Population
2007	962
2008	947
2009	930
2010	921
2011	876
2012	865
2013	830
2014	828
2015	809
2016	803
