= Fichtwald =

- Municipality
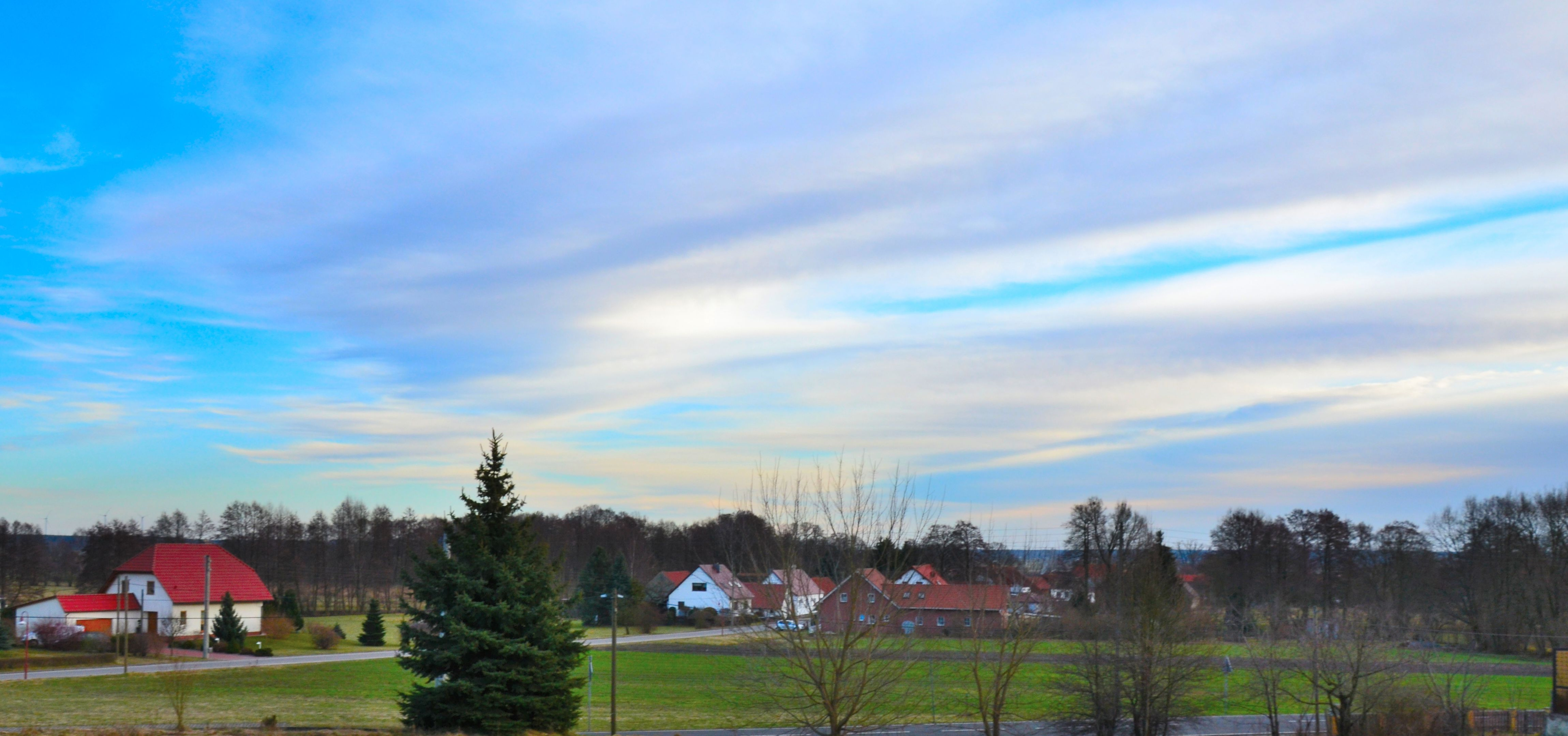

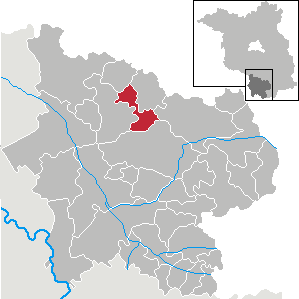
- Location of Fichtwald within Elbe-Elster district
- Interactive map of Fichtwald
- Location within Germany Location within Brandenburg
- Coordinates: 51°42′00″N 13°28′00″E
- Country: Germany
- State: Brandenburg
- District: Elbe-Elster
- Municipal assoc.: Schlieben
- Subdivisions: 3 Ortsteile

Government
  - Mayor (2024–29): Thomas Wilkert

Area
  - Total: 31.55 km^{2} (12.18 sq mi)
- Elevation: 112 m (367 ft)

Population (2025-12-31)
  - Total: 587
  - Density: 18.6/km^{2} (48.2/sq mi)
- Time zone: UTC+01:00 (CET)
  - Summer (DST): UTC+02:00 (CEST)
- Postal codes: 04936
- Dialling codes: 035361
- Vehicle registration: EE, FI, LIB

Fichtwald is a municipality in the Elbe-Elster district, in Brandenburg, Germany.

== History ==
From 1815 to 1944, the constituent localities of Fichtwald was part of the Prussian Province of Saxony. From 1944 to 1945, they were part of the Province of Halle-Merseburg. From 1952 to 1990, they were part of the Bezirk Cottbus of East Germany. On 31 December 2001, the municipality of Fichtwald was formed by merging the municipalities of Hillmersdorf, Naundorf and Stechau.

== Demography ==
Development of population since 1875 within the current boundaries (Blue line: population; dotted line: Comparison to population development of Brandenburg state; grey background: Time of Nazi rule; red background: Time of communist rule)

Fichtwald: Population development
within the current boundaries (2017)

Year	Pop.	±% p.a.
1875	970	—
1890	980	+0.07%
1910	960	−0.10%
1925	1,001	+0.28%
1933	931	−0.90%
1939	866	−1.20%
1946	1,362	+6.68%
1950	1,333	−0.54%
1964	1,019	−1.90%
1971	1,003	−0.23%
1981	943	−0.61%
1985	952	+0.24%
1989	890	−1.67%
1990	883	−0.79%

Year	Pop.	±% p.a.
1991	854	−3.28%
1992	851	−0.35%
1993	841	−1.18%
1994	845	+0.48%
1995	843	−0.24%
1996	833	−1.19%
1997	817	−1.92%
1998	813	−0.49%
1999	813	+0.00%
2000	804	−1.11%
2001	802	−0.25%
2002	780	−2.74%
2003	775	−0.64%
2004	759	−2.06%

Year	Pop.	±% p.a.
2005	735	−3.16%
2006	716	−2.59%
2007	709	−0.98%
2008	703	−0.85%
2009	686	−2.42%
2010	675	−1.60%
2011	660	−2.22%
2012	683	+3.48%
2013	685	+0.29%
2014	678	−1.02%
2015	673	−0.74%
2016	649	−3.57%
2017	625	−3.70%
