= Rückersdorf, Brandenburg =

Rückersdorf
- Municipality
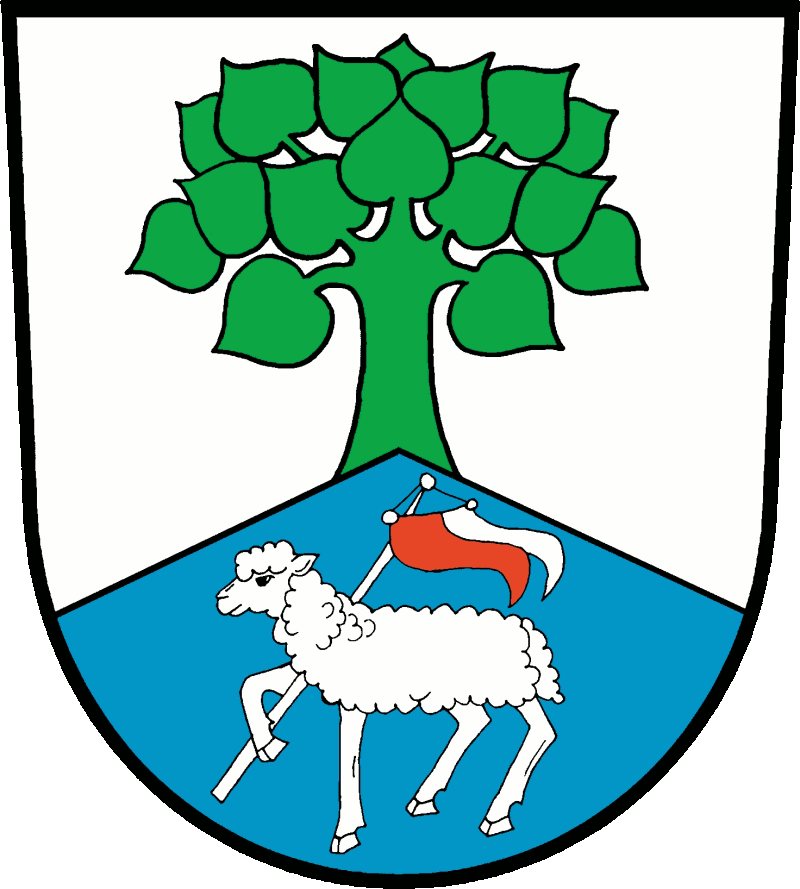
- Coat of arms

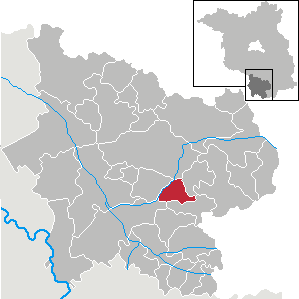
- Location of Rückersdorf within Elbe-Elster district
- Interactive map of Rückersdorf
- Location within Germany Location within Brandenburg
- Coordinates: 51°34′59″N 13°34′00″E
- Country: Germany
- State: Brandenburg
- District: Elbe-Elster
- Municipal assoc.: Elsterland
- Subdivisions: 3 Ortsteile

Government
  - Mayor (2024–29): Georg Zörner (CDU)

Area
  - Total: 24.71 km^{2} (9.54 sq mi)
- Elevation: 98 m (322 ft)

Population (2025-12-31)
  - Total: 1,346
  - Density: 54.47/km^{2} (141.1/sq mi)
- Time zone: UTC+01:00 (CET)
  - Summer (DST): UTC+02:00 (CEST)
- Postal codes: 03238
- Dialling codes: 035325
- Vehicle registration: EE, FI, LIB
- Website: www.gemeinde-rueckersdorf.com

Rückersdorf (German pronunciation: [ˈʁʏkɐsdɔʁf]) is a municipality in the Elbe-Elster district, in Lower Lusatia, Brandenburg, Germany.

== History ==
From 1815 to 1947, Rückersdorf was part of the Prussian Province of Brandenburg. From 1952 to 1990, it was part of the Bezirk Cottbus of East Germany.

== Demography ==
Development of Population since 1875 within the Current Boundaries (Blue Line: Population; Dotted Line: Comparison to Population Development of Brandenburg state; Grey Background: Time of Nazi rule; Red Background: Time of Communist rule)

Rückersdorf: Population development within the current boundaries (2013)

Year	Population
1875	1 274
1890	1 186
1910	1 312
1925	1 283
1933	1 290
1939	1 357
1946	1 812
1950	1 850
1964	1 793
1971	1 888

Year	Population
1981	2 034
1985	2 077
1989	2 183
1990	2 098
1991	2 034
1992	2 062
1993	2 012
1994	1 952
1995	1 973
1996	1 952

Year	Population
1997	1 980
1998	1 965
1999	1 926
2000	1 889
2001	1 898
2002	1 857
2003	1 815
2004	1 780
2005	1 737
2006	1 694

Year	Population
2007	1 678
2008	1 683
2009	1 624
2010	1 613
2011	1 520
2012	1 476
2013	1 466
2014	1 469
2015	1 466
2016	1 392
