= Elbe-Elster =

Coordinates: 51°36′N 13°26′E

- District
- Flag Coat of arms
- Country: Germany
- State: Brandenburg
- Capital: Herzberg

Government
  - District admin.: Christian Jaschinski (CDU)

Area
  - Total: 1,889.4 km^{2} (729.5 sq mi)

Population (31 December 2025)
  - Total: 97,017
  - Density: 51.348/km^{2} (132.99/sq mi)
- Time zone: UTC+01:00 (CET)
  - Summer (DST): UTC+02:00 (CEST)
- Vehicle registration: EE, FI, LIB
- Website: landkreis-elbe-elster.de

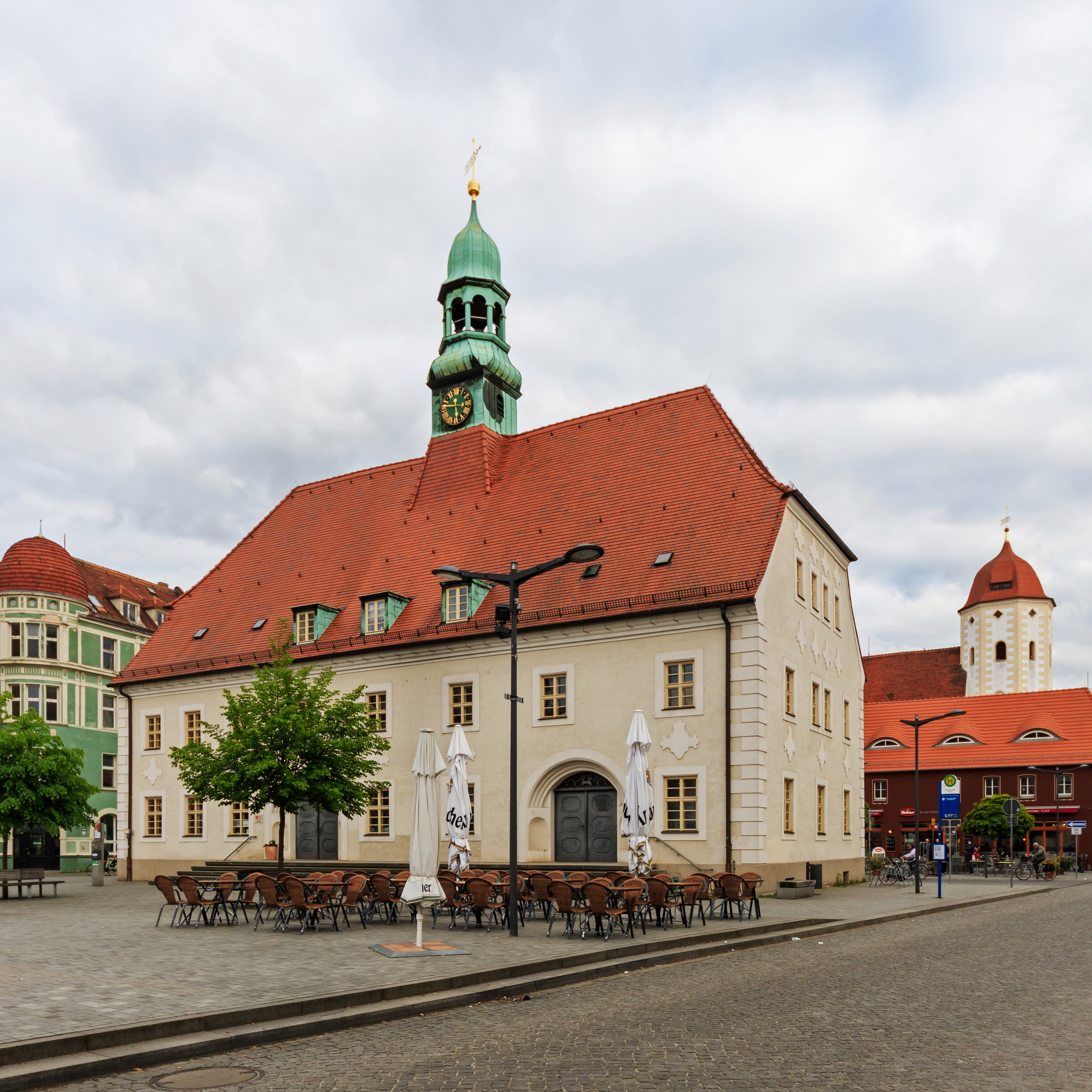
Finsterwalde May2015 img2 Rathaus

Elbe-Elster is a Kreis (district) in the southern part of Brandenburg, Germany. Neighboring districts are Teltow-Fläming, Dahme-Spreewald, Oberspreewald-Lausitz, Meißen, Nordsachsen and Wittenberg. The district has a partnership with the Märkischer Kreis.

== History ==
The district was established in 1993 by merging the former districts (Kreise) of Finsterwalde, Bad Liebenwerda and Herzberg.

== Geography ==
The district is named after two rivers - the Elbe river forms the western border with Saxony, the Black Elster (Schwarze Elster) is a tributary of the Elbe and runs through the district. The district is part of the Lusatia region. The fens along the Black Elster are a habitat of several rare animals, like common kingfishers, beavers and Eurasian otters.

== Demography ==
Development of Population since 1875 within the Current Boundaries (Blue Line: Population; Dotted Line: Comparison to Population Development of Brandenburg state)

Recent Population Development and Projections (Population Development before Census 2011 (blue line); Recent Population Development according to the Census in Germany in 2011 (blue bordered line); Official projections for 2005-2030 (yellow line); for 2014-2030 (red line); for 2017-2030 (scarlet line)

Landkreis Elbe-Elster: Population development
within the current boundaries (2025)

Year	Pop.	±% p.a.
1875	89,046	—
1890	95,414	+0.46%
1910	116,632	+1.01%
1925	124,457	+0.43%
1933	129,274	+0.48%
1939	135,724	+0.81%
1946	175,945	+3.78%
1950	174,612	−0.19%
1964	156,012	−0.80%
1971	156,734	+0.07%

Year	Pop.	±% p.a.
1981	149,216	−0.49%
1985	147,731	−0.25%
1990	142,679	−0.69%
1995	136,889	−0.83%
2000	131,161	−0.85%
2005	122,031	−1.43%
2010	111,975	−1.71%
2015	104,673	−1.34%
2020	101,085	−0.70%
2025	97,017	−0.82%

== Coat of arms ==
District banner of Elbe-Elster

The coat of arms was granted in 1995. The lion in the bottom left derives from the county of Meissen (see Saxony), to which the southern area of the district belonged historically. The black bars derive from the Saxony-Wittenberg county as the area around Bad Liebenwerda belonged there in the past. The red bars derive from the oldest coat of arms of Brandenburg, and the bull is the symbol for the Lower Lusatia area were the district is located.

== Towns and municipalities ==
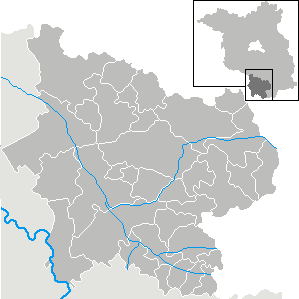
Clickable map of towns and municipalities in the district

Amt-free towns	Ämter		Verbandsgemeinde
1. Doberlug-Kirchhain; 2. Elsterwerda; 3. Finsterwalde; 4. Herzberg (Elster); 5. Schönewalde; 6. Sonnewalde; Amt-free municipality: 1. Röderland	1. Elsterland; 1. Heideland; 2. Rückersdorf; 3. Schilda; 4. Schönborn^{1}; 5. Tröbitz; 2. Kleine Elster (Niederlausitz); 1. Crinitz; 2. Lichterfeld-Schacksdorf; 3. Massen-Niederlausitz^{1}; 4. Sallgast; 3. Plessa; 1. Gorden-Staupitz; 2. Hohenleipisch; 3. Plessa^{1}; 4. Schraden	4. Schlieben; 1. Fichtwald; 2. Hohenbucko; 3. Kremitzaue; 4. Lebusa; 5. Schlieben^{1, 2}; 5. Schradenland; 1. Gröden^{1}; 2. Großthiemig; 3. Hirschfeld; 4. Merzdorf	1. Liebenwerda; 1. Bad Liebenwerda^{1, 2}; 2. Falkenberg/Elster^{2}; 3. Mühlberg^{2}; 4. Uebigau-Wahrenbrück^{2}
^{1}seat of the Amt; ^{2}town
