= Schönborn, Brandenburg =

Schönborn
- Municipality
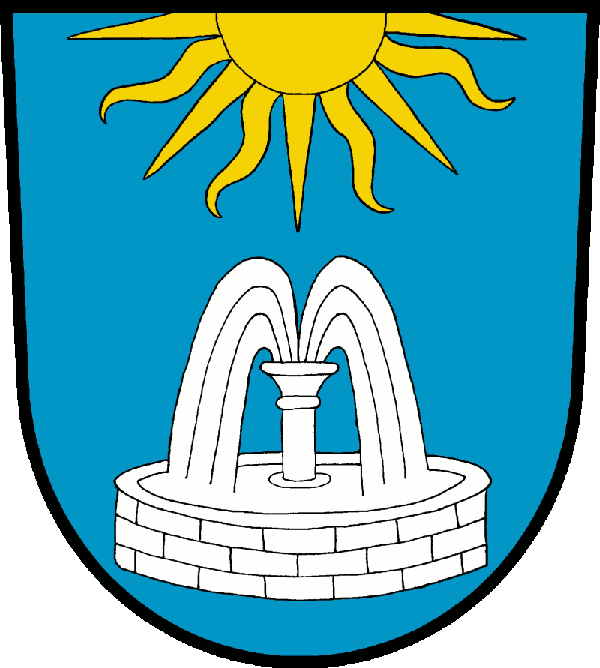
- Coat of arms

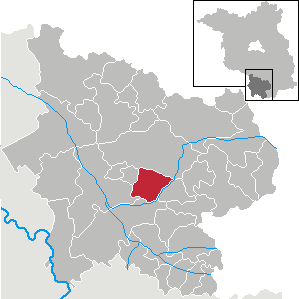
- Location of Schönborn within Elbe-Elster district
- Interactive map of Schönborn
- Location within Germany Location within Brandenburg
- Coordinates: 51°36′00″N 13°30′00″E
- Country: Germany
- State: Brandenburg
- District: Elbe-Elster
- Municipal assoc.: Elsterland
- Subdivisions: 4 Ortsteile

Government
  - Mayor (2024–29): Daniel Mende

Area
  - Total: 38.83 km^{2} (14.99 sq mi)
- Elevation: 91 m (299 ft)

Population (2025-12-31)
  - Total: 1,460
  - Density: 37.6/km^{2} (97.4/sq mi)
- Time zone: UTC+01:00 (CET)
  - Summer (DST): UTC+02:00 (CEST)
- Postal codes: 03253
- Dialling codes: 035326
- Vehicle registration: EE, FI, LIB
- Website: www.schoenborn-ee.de

Schönborn (German pronunciation: [ˈʃøːnbɔʁn]) is a municipality in the Elbe-Elster district, in Lower Lusatia, Brandenburg, Germany.

== History ==
From 1815 to 1947, Schönborn was part of the Prussian Province of Brandenburg. From 1952 to 1990, it was part of the Bezirk Cottbus of East Germany.

== Demography ==
Development of Population since 1875 within the Current Boundaries (Blue Line: Population; Dotted Line: Comparison to Population Development of Brandenburg state; Grey Background: Time of Nazi rule; Red Background: Time of Communist rule)

Schönborn population development
within the current boundaries (2013)

Year	Pop.	±% p.a.
1875	1,547	—
1890	1,763	+0.88%
1910	2,319	+1.38%
1925	2,426	+0.30%
1933	2,512	+0.44%
1939	2,546	+0.22%
1946	3,011	+2.43%
1950	3,160	+1.21%
1964	2,666	−1.21%
1971	2,507	−0.87%
1981	2,280	−0.94%
1985	2,300	+0.22%
1989	2,332	+0.35%
1990	2,290	−1.80%
1991	2,266	−1.05%
1992	2,208	−2.56%
1993	2,188	−0.91%
1994	2,184	−0.18%
1995	2,173	−0.50%
1996	2,167	−0.28%

Year	Pop.	±% p.a.
1997	2,173	+0.28%
1998	2,130	−1.98%
1999	2,091	−1.83%
2000	2,041	−2.39%
2001	2,014	−1.32%
2002	1,994	−0.99%
2003	1,937	−2.86%
2004	1,908	−1.50%
2005	1,917	+0.47%
2006	1,820	−5.06%
2007	1,791	−1.59%
2008	1,749	−2.35%
2009	1,694	−3.14%
2010	1,647	−2.77%
2011	1,606	−2.49%
2012	1,579	−1.68%
2013	1,593	+0.89%
2014	1,546	−2.95%
2015	1,565	+1.23%
2016	1,553	−0.77%
