= Kleine Elster (Niederlausitz) =

- Amt
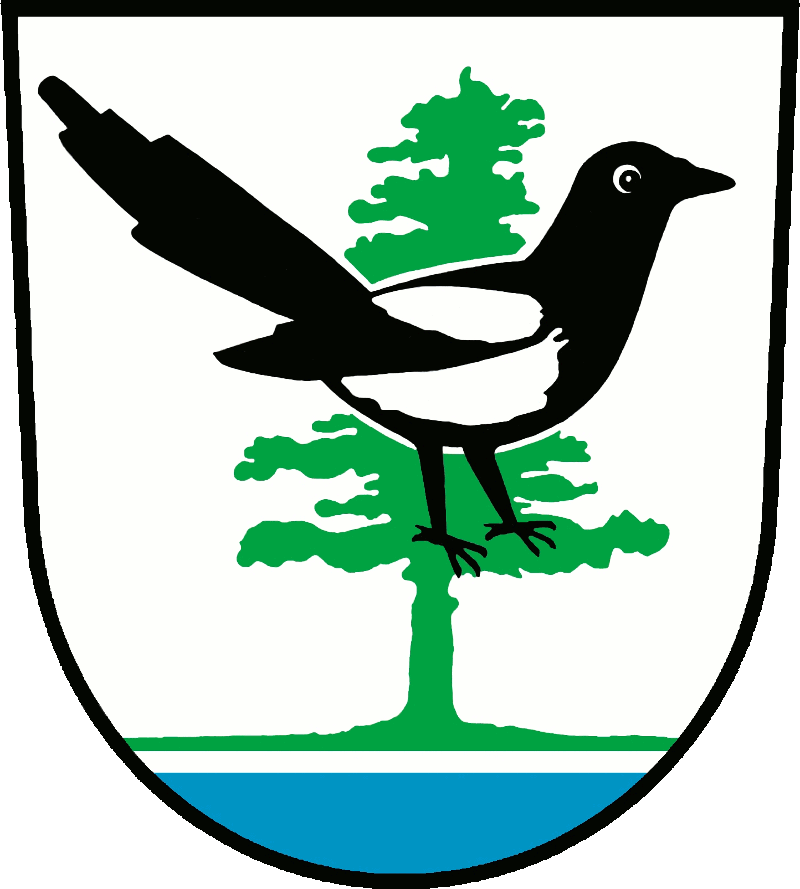
- Coat of arms

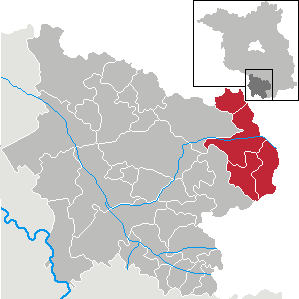
- Map of Elbe-Elster highlighting Kleine Elster (Niederlausitz)
- Interactive map of Kleine Elster (Niederlausitz)
- Location within Germany Location within Brandenburg
- Coordinates: 51°38′N 13°44′E
- Country: Germany
- State: Brandenburg
- District: Elbe-Elster
- Seat: Massen-Niederlausitz
- Subdivisions: 4 municipalities

Area
  - Total: 180.52 km^{2} (69.70 sq mi)

Population (2025-12-31)
  - Total: 5,346
  - Density: 29.61/km^{2} (76.70/sq mi)
- Time zone: UTC+01:00 (CET)
  - Summer (DST): UTC+02:00 (CEST)
- Website: www.amt-kleine-elster.de

Amt Kleine Elster (Niederlausitz) is an Amt ("collective municipality") in the district of Elbe-Elster, in Brandenburg, Germany. Its seat is in Massen-Niederlausitz.

The Amt Kleine Elster (Niederlausitz) consists of the following municipalities:

1. Crinitz
2. Lichterfeld-Schacksdorf
3. Massen-Niederlausitz
4. Sallgast

== Demography ==
Development of Population since 1875 within the Current Boundaries (Blue Line: Population; Dotted Line: Comparison to Population Development of Brandenburg state; Grey Background: Time of Nazi rule; Red Background: Time of Communist rule)

Recent Population Development and Projections (Population Development before Census 2011 (blue line); Recent Population Development according to the Census in Germany in 2011 (blue bordered line); Official projections for 2005-2030 (yellow line); for 2017-2030 (scarlet line); for 2020-2030 (green line)

Amt Kleine Elster (Niederlausitz): Population development
within the current boundaries (2020)

Year	Pop.	±% p.a.
1875	5,139	—
1890	5,611	+0.59%
1910	8,344	+2.00%
1925	8,204	−0.11%
1939	8,599	+0.34%
1950	11,060	+2.31%
1964	9,192	−1.31%
1971	8,916	−0.43%
1981	7,709	−1.44%

Year	Pop.	±% p.a.
1985	7,490	−0.72%
1990	6,856	−1.75%
1995	7,051	+0.56%
2000	7,135	+0.24%
2005	6,745	−1.12%
2010	6,119	−1.93%
2015	5,763	−1.19%
2020	5,376	−1.38%
2025	5,346	−0.11%
