= Schlieben =

- Town
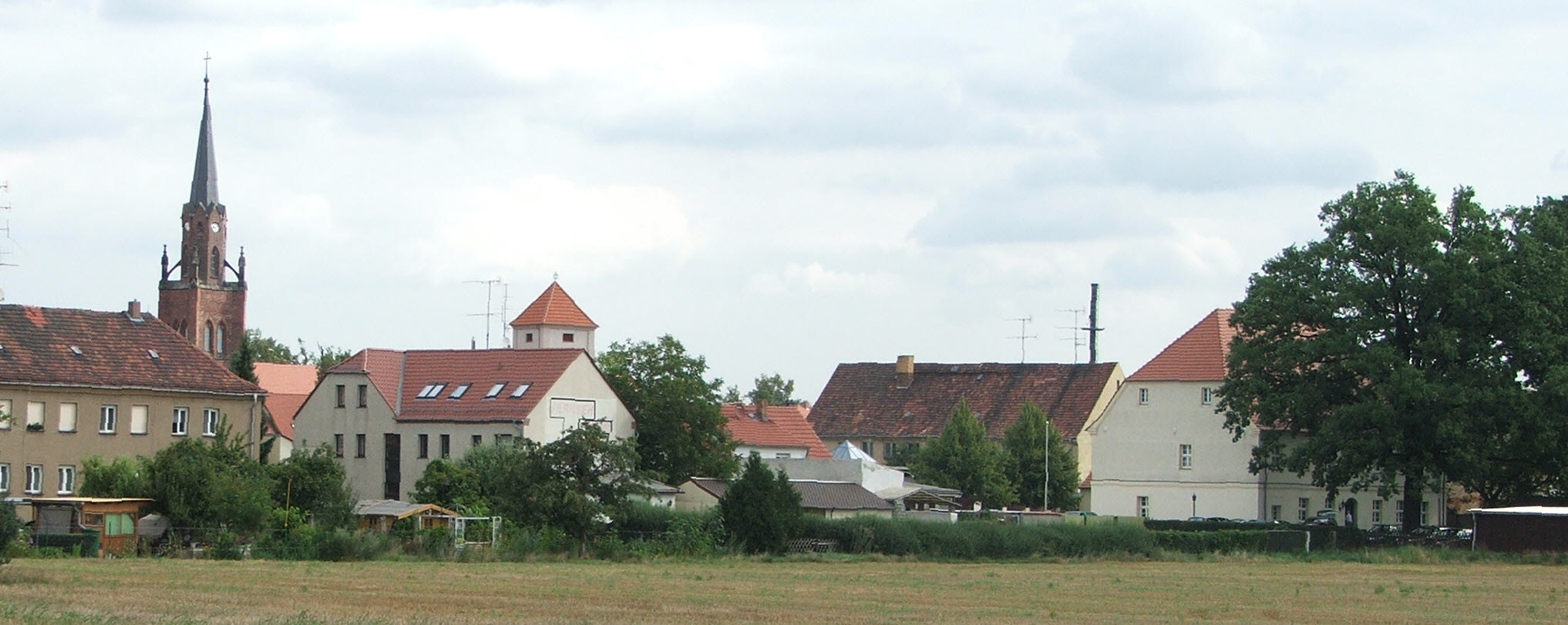
- General view of Schlieben, with the bell-tower of historic St Martin’s Church at left

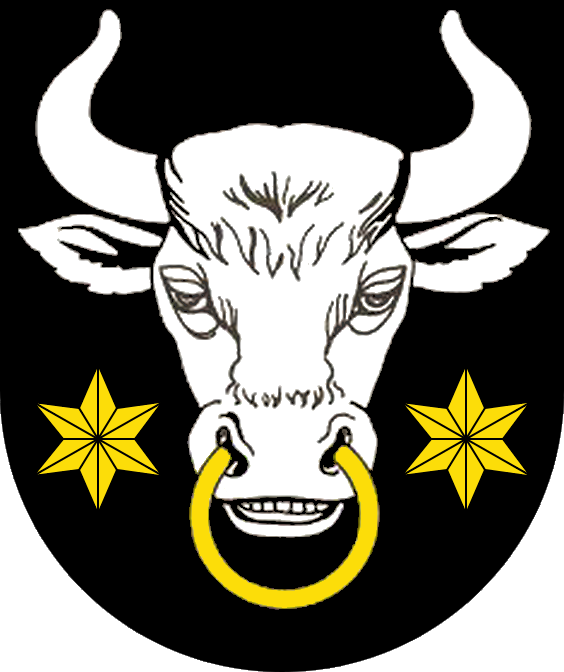
- Coat of arms

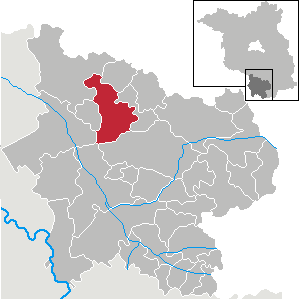
- Location of Schlieben within Elbe-Elster district
- Interactive map of Schlieben
- Location within Germany Location within Brandenburg
- Coordinates: 51°43′00″N 13°22′59″E
- Country: Germany
- State: Brandenburg
- District: Elbe-Elster
- Municipal assoc.: Schlieben
- Subdivisions: 6 Ortsteile

Government
  - Mayor (2024–29): Cornelia Schülzchen (CDU)

Area
  - Total: 78.65 km^{2} (30.37 sq mi)
- Elevation: 89 m (292 ft)

Population (2025-12-31)
  - Total: 2,309
  - Density: 29.36/km^{2} (76.04/sq mi)
- Time zone: UTC+01:00 (CET)
  - Summer (DST): UTC+02:00 (CEST)
- Postal codes: 04936
- Dialling codes: 035361
- Vehicle registration: EE, FI, LIB
- Website: www.schlieben.com

Schlieben (pronounced [ˈʃliːbn̩]; Lower Sorbian: Sliwin, pronounced [ˈslʲiwʲin]) is a town in the Elbe-Elster district, in southwestern Brandenburg, Germany. It is situated 22 kilometres (14 mi) north of Bad Liebenwerda. Schlieben was the site of a concentration camp during The Holocaust.

== History ==
From 1815 to 1944, Schlieben was part of the Prussian Province of Saxony. From 1944 to 1945, it was part of the Province of Halle-Merseburg. From 1952 to 1990, it was part of the Bezirk Cottbus of East Germany.

== Demography ==
Development of Population since 1875 within the Current Boundaries (Blue Line: Population; Dotted Line: Comparison to Population Development of Brandenburg state; Grey Background: Time of Nazi rule; Red Background: Time of Communist rule)

Schlieben population development
within the current boundaries (2013)

Year	Pop.	±% p.a.
1875	3,374	—
1890	3,196	−0.36%
1910	2,910	−0.47%
1925	2,778	−0.31%
1933	2,802	+0.11%
1939	2,686	−0.70%
1946	4,427	+7.40%
1950	4,496	+0.39%
1964	3,966	−0.89%
1971	3,974	+0.03%
1981	3,620	−0.93%
1985	3,562	−0.40%
1989	3,472	−0.64%
1990	3,403	−1.99%
1991	3,351	−1.53%
1992	3,327	−0.72%
1993	3,294	−0.99%
1994	3,258	−1.09%
1995	3,242	−0.49%
1996	3,222	−0.62%

Year	Pop.	±% p.a.
1997	3,272	+1.55%
1998	3,279	+0.21%
1999	3,207	−2.20%
2000	3,188	−0.59%
2001	3,102	−2.70%
2002	3,069	−1.06%
2003	3,032	−1.21%
2004	2,993	−1.29%
2005	2,930	−2.10%
2006	2,807	−4.20%
2007	2,775	−1.14%
2008	2,734	−1.48%
2009	2,695	−1.43%
2010	2,665	−1.11%
2011	2,609	−2.10%
2012	2,588	−0.80%
2013	2,564	−0.93%
2014	2,511	−2.07%
2015	2,452	−2.35%
2016	2,422	−1.22%

== Notable people ==
=== Sons and daughters of the city ===
- Ernst Legal (1881-1955), actor, director and director

=== People connected with the city ===
- Edwin Zimmermann (* 1948), politician (SPD), 1990-1997 Minister for Food, Agriculture and Forestry of the State of Brandenburg
