= Crinitz =

- Municipality
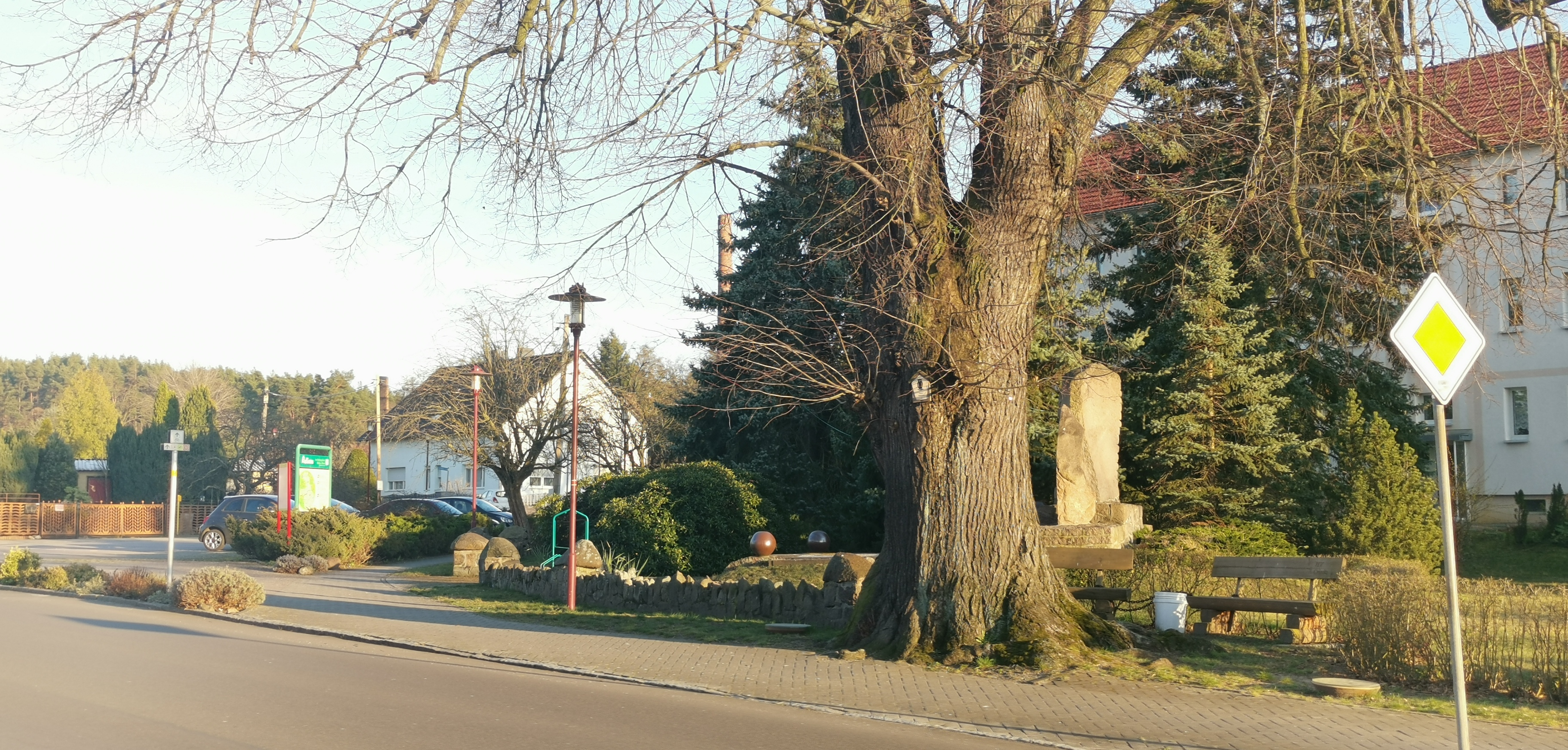

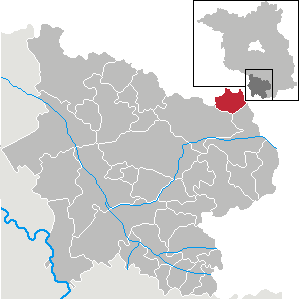
- Location of Crinitz within Elbe-Elster district
- Interactive map of Crinitz
- Location within Germany Location within Brandenburg
- Coordinates: 51°43′59″N 13°46′00″E
- Country: Germany
- State: Brandenburg
- District: Elbe-Elster
- Municipal assoc.: Kleine Elster (Niederlausitz)
- Subdivisions: 3 Ortsteile

Government
  - Mayor (2024–29): Uwe Mader

Area
  - Total: 21.83 km^{2} (8.43 sq mi)
- Elevation: 99 m (325 ft)

Population (2025-12-31)
  - Total: 1,137
  - Density: 52.08/km^{2} (134.9/sq mi)
- Time zone: UTC+01:00 (CET)
  - Summer (DST): UTC+02:00 (CEST)
- Postal codes: 03246
- Dialling codes: 035324
- Vehicle registration: EE, FI, LIB
- Website: www.crinitz.de

Crinitz (Lower Sorbian: Krynica) is a municipality in the Elbe-Elster district, in Lower Lusatia, Brandenburg, Germany.

== History ==
From 1815 to 1947, Crinitz was part of the Prussian Province of Brandenburg. From 1952 to 1990, it was part of the Bezirk Cottbus of East Germany. The municipality in its current borders was created on 26 October 2003 by the legally decreed incorporation of the municipality of Gahro into the municipality of Crinitz. Both municipalities had been administered by the Kleine Elster (Niederlausitz) office (until 1995 Amt Kleine Elster) since 1992.

== Demography ==
Development of population since 1875 within the current boundaries (Blue line: Population; Dotted line: Comparison to population development of Brandenburg state; Grey background: Time of Nazi rule; Red background: Time of communist rule)

Crinitz: Population development
within the current boundaries (2017)

Year	Pop.	±% p.a.
1875	958	—
1890	1,011	+0.36%
1910	1,030	+0.09%
1925	1,134	+0.64%
1933	1,355	+2.25%
1939	1,482	+1.50%
1946	2,049	+4.74%
1950	2,142	+1.12%
1964	2,008	−0.46%
1971	2,104	+0.67%
1981	1,782	−1.65%
1985	1,730	−0.74%
1989	1,681	−0.72%
1990	1,664	−1.01%

Year	Pop.	±% p.a.
1991	1,638	−1.56%
1992	1,636	−0.12%
1993	1,629	−0.43%
1994	1,635	+0.37%
1995	1,632	−0.18%
1996	1,626	−0.37%
1997	1,636	+0.62%
1998	1,608	−1.71%
1999	1,557	−3.17%
2000	1,566	+0.58%
2001	1,541	−1.60%
2002	1,519	−1.43%
2003	1,512	−0.46%
2004	1,481	−2.05%

Year	Pop.	±% p.a.
2005	1,450	−2.09%
2006	1,407	−2.97%
2007	1,373	−2.42%
2008	1,340	−2.40%
2009	1,339	−0.07%
2010	1,295	−3.29%
2011	1,257	−2.93%
2012	1,236	−1.67%
2013	1,238	+0.16%
2014	1,226	−0.97%
2015	1,222	−0.33%
2016	1,214	−0.65%
2017	1,196	−1.48%
