= Schradenland =

- Amt
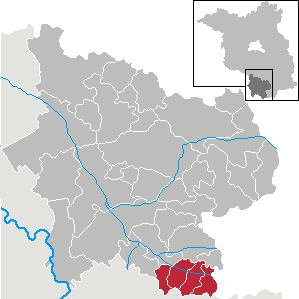
- Map of Elbe-Elster highlighting Schradenland
- Interactive map of Schradenland
- Location within Germany Location within Brandenburg
- Coordinates: 51°24′N 13°34′E
- Country: Germany
- State: Brandenburg
- District: Elbe-Elster
- Seat: Gröden
- Subdivisions: 4 municipalities

Area
  - Total: 75.48 km^{2} (29.14 sq mi)

Population (2025-12-31)
  - Total: 4,247
  - Density: 56.27/km^{2} (145.7/sq mi)
- Time zone: UTC+01:00 (CET)
  - Summer (DST): UTC+02:00 (CEST)
- Website: www.amt-schradenland.de

Amt Schradenland is an Amt ("collective municipality") in the district of Elbe-Elster, in Brandenburg, Germany. Its seat is in Gröden.

The Amt Schradenland consists of the following municipalities:

1. Gröden
2. Großthiemig
3. Hirschfeld
4. Merzdorf

== Demography ==
Development of Population since 1875 within the Current Boundaries (Blue Line: Population; Dotted Line: Comparison to Population Development of Brandenburg state; Grey Background: Time of Nazi rule; Red Background: Time of Communist rule)

Recent Population Development and Projections (Population Development before Census 2011 (blue line); Recent Population Development according to the Census in Germany in 2011 (blue bordered line); Official projections for 2005-2030 (yellow line); for 2017-2030 (scarlet line); for 2020-2030 (green line)

Amt Schradenland: Population development
within the current boundaries (2020)

Year	Pop.	±% p.a.
1875	3,600	—
1890	3,800	+0.36%
1910	4,100	+0.38%
1925	4,790	+1.04%
1939	4,792	+0.00%
1950	6,406	+2.67%
1964	5,856	−0.64%
1971	5,918	+0.15%
1981	5,975	+0.10%

Year	Pop.	±% p.a.
1985	6,087	+0.47%
1990	5,985	−0.34%
1995	5,751	−0.79%
2000	5,572	−0.63%
2005	5,250	−1.18%
2010	4,958	−1.14%
2015	4,550	−1.70%
2020	4,393	−0.70%
2025	4,247	−0.67%
