= Massen-Niederlausitz =

Massen-Niederlausitz Mašow
- Municipality
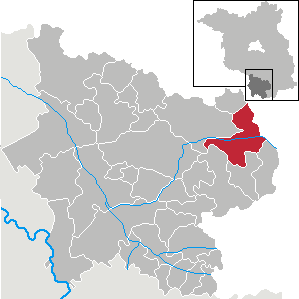
- Location of Massen-Niederlausitz; Mašow within Elbe-Elster district
- Interactive map of Massen-Niederlausitz; Mašow
- Location within Germany Location within Brandenburg
- Coordinates: 51°39′N 13°44′E
- Country: Germany
- State: Brandenburg
- District: Elbe-Elster
- Municipal assoc.: Kleine Elster (Niederlausitz)
- Subdivisions: 8 Ortsteile

Government
  - Mayor (2024–29): Mike Prach

Area
  - Total: 76.08 km^{2} (29.37 sq mi)
- Elevation: 108 m (354 ft)

Population (2025-12-31)
  - Total: 1,883
  - Density: 24.75/km^{2} (64.10/sq mi)
- Time zone: UTC+01:00 (CET)
  - Summer (DST): UTC+02:00 (CEST)
- Postal codes: 03238
- Dialling codes: 03531
- Vehicle registration: EE, FI, LIB

Massen-Niederlausitz (Lower Sorbian: Mašow, pronounced [ˈmaʃɔw]) is a municipality in the Elbe-Elster district, in Lower Lusatia, Brandenburg, Germany.

== History ==
From 1815 to 1947, the constituent localities of Massen-Niederlausitz (Babben, Betten, Lindthal, Massen, Gröbitz and Ponnsdorf) were part of the Prussian Province of Brandenburg. From 1952 to 1990, they were part of the Bezirk Cottbus of East Germany. On 31 December 1997, the municipality of Massen-Niederlausitz was formed by merging the municipalities of Babben, Betten, Lindthal and Massen. On 31 December 2001, the municipalities of Gröbitz and Ponnsdorf were merged into it.

== Demography ==
Development of Population since 1875 within the Current Boundaries (Blue Line: Population; Dotted Line: Comparison to Population Development of Brandenburg state; Grey Background: Time of Nazi rule; Red Background: Time of Communist rule)

Massen-Niederlausitz: Population development within the current boundaries (2013)

Year	Population
1875	1 795
1890	1 715
1910	1 979
1925	2 062
1933	2 202
1939	2 426
1946	3 295
1950	3 230
1964	2 639
1971	2 576

Year	Population
1981	2 360
1985	2 343
1989	2 305
1990	2 263
1991	2 198
1992	2 201
1993	2 261
1994	2 263
1995	2 253
1996	2 258

Year	Population
1997	2 272
1998	2 328
1999	2 411
2000	2 412
2001	2 429
2002	2 382
2003	2 362
2004	2 350
2005	2 309
2006	2 236

Year	Population
2007	2 214
2008	2 190
2009	2 129
2010	2 093
2011	2 066
2012	2 044
2013	2 017
2014	1 981
2015	1 962
2016	1 919
