= Heideland, Brandenburg =

Heideland
- Municipality
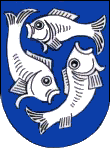
- Coat of arms

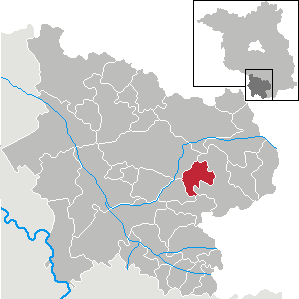
- Location of Heideland within Elbe-Elster district
- Interactive map of Heideland
- Location within Germany Location within Brandenburg
- Coordinates: 51°36′00″N 13°40′00″E
- Country: Germany
- State: Brandenburg
- District: Elbe-Elster
- Municipal assoc.: Elsterland
- Subdivisions: 3 Ortsteile

Government
  - Mayor (2024–29): Silke Löwe

Area
  - Total: 31.74 km^{2} (12.25 sq mi)
- Elevation: 105 m (344 ft)

Population (2025-12-31)
  - Total: 461
  - Density: 14.5/km^{2} (37.6/sq mi)
- Time zone: UTC+01:00 (CET)
  - Summer (DST): UTC+02:00 (CEST)
- Postal codes: 03238
- Dialling codes: 03531
- Vehicle registration: EE, FI, LIB

Heideland (German pronunciation: [ˈhaɪdəlant]) is a municipality in the Elbe-Elster district, in Lower Lusatia, Brandenburg, Germany.

== History ==
From 1815 to 1947, the constituent localities of Heideland (Eichholz, Drößig and Fischwasser) were part of the Prussian Province of Brandenburg. From 1952 to 1990, they were part of the Bezirk Cottbus of East Germany. On 31 December 2001, the municipality of Heideland was formed by merging the municipalities of Eichholz-Drößig and Fischwasser.

== Demography ==
Development of Population since 1875 within the Current Boundaries (Blue Line: Population; Dotted Line: Comparison to Population Development of Brandenburg state; Grey Background: Time of Nazi rule; Red Background: Time of Communist rule)

Heideland: Population development
within the current boundaries (2017)

Year	Pop.	±% p.a.
1875	854	—
1890	838	−0.13%
1910	881	+0.25%
1925	918	+0.27%
1933	864	−0.75%
1939	855	−0.17%
1946	1,157	+4.42%
1950	1,085	−1.59%
1964	849	−1.74%
1971	782	−1.17%
1981	666	−1.59%
1985	662	−0.15%
1989	649	−0.49%
1990	648	−0.15%

Year	Pop.	±% p.a.
1991	619	−4.48%
1992	611	−1.29%
1993	613	+0.33%
1994	629	+2.61%
1995	625	−0.64%
1996	609	−2.56%
1997	608	−0.16%
1998	615	+1.15%
1999	604	−1.79%
2000	624	+3.31%
2001	629	+0.80%
2002	618	−1.75%
2003	616	−0.32%
2004	622	+0.97%

Year	Pop.	±% p.a.
2005	610	−1.93%
2006	593	−2.79%
2007	593	+0.00%
2008	599	+1.01%
2009	579	−3.34%
2010	560	−3.28%
2011	554	−1.07%
2012	554	+0.00%
2013	557	+0.54%
2014	544	−2.33%
2015	532	−2.21%
2016	530	−0.38%
2017	524	−1.13%
