= Elsterland =

- Amt
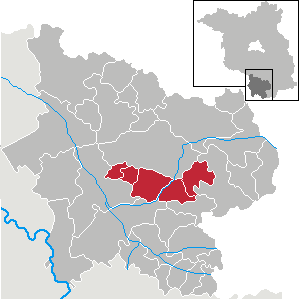
- Map of Elbe-Elster highlighting Elsterland
- Interactive map of Elsterland
- Location within Germany Location within Brandenburg
- Coordinates: 51°36′N 13°30′E
- Country: Germany
- State: Brandenburg
- District: Elbe-Elster
- Seat: Schönborn
- Subdivisions: 5 municipalities

Area
  - Total: 114.56 km^{2} (44.23 sq mi)

Population (2025-12-31)
  - Total: 4,299
  - Density: 37.53/km^{2} (97.19/sq mi)
- Time zone: UTC+01:00 (CET)
  - Summer (DST): UTC+02:00 (CEST)
- Website: www.elsterland.de

Amt Elsterland is an Amt ("collective municipality") in the district of Elbe-Elster, in Brandenburg, Germany. Its seat is in Schönborn.

The Amt Elsterland consists of the following municipalities:

1. Heideland
2. Rückersdorf
3. Schilda
4. Schönborn
5. Tröbitz

== Demography ==
Development of Population since 1875 within the Current Boundaries (Blue Line: Population; Dotted Line: Comparison to Population Development of Brandenburg state; Grey Background: Time of Nazi rule; Red Background: Time of Communist rule)

Recent Population Development and Projections (Population Development before Census 2011 (blue line); Recent Population Development according to the Census in Germany in 2011 (blue bordered line); Official projections for 2005-2030 (yellow line); for 2017-2030 (scarlet line); for 2020-2030 (green line)

Amt Elsterland: Population development
within the current boundaries (2020)

Year	Pop.	±% p.a.
1875	4,273	—
1890	4,492	+0.33%
1910	6,148	+1.58%
1925	6,315	+0.18%
1939	6,455	+0.16%
1950	8,369	+2.39%
1964	7,261	−1.01%
1971	7,107	−0.31%
1981	6,928	−0.25%

Year	Pop.	±% p.a.
1985	6,984	+0.20%
1990	6,948	−0.10%
1995	6,488	−1.36%
2000	6,093	−1.25%
2005	5,613	−1.63%
2010	5,081	−1.97%
2015	4,759	−1.30%
2020	4,442	−1.37%
2025	4,299	−0.65%
