= Sallgast =

- Municipality
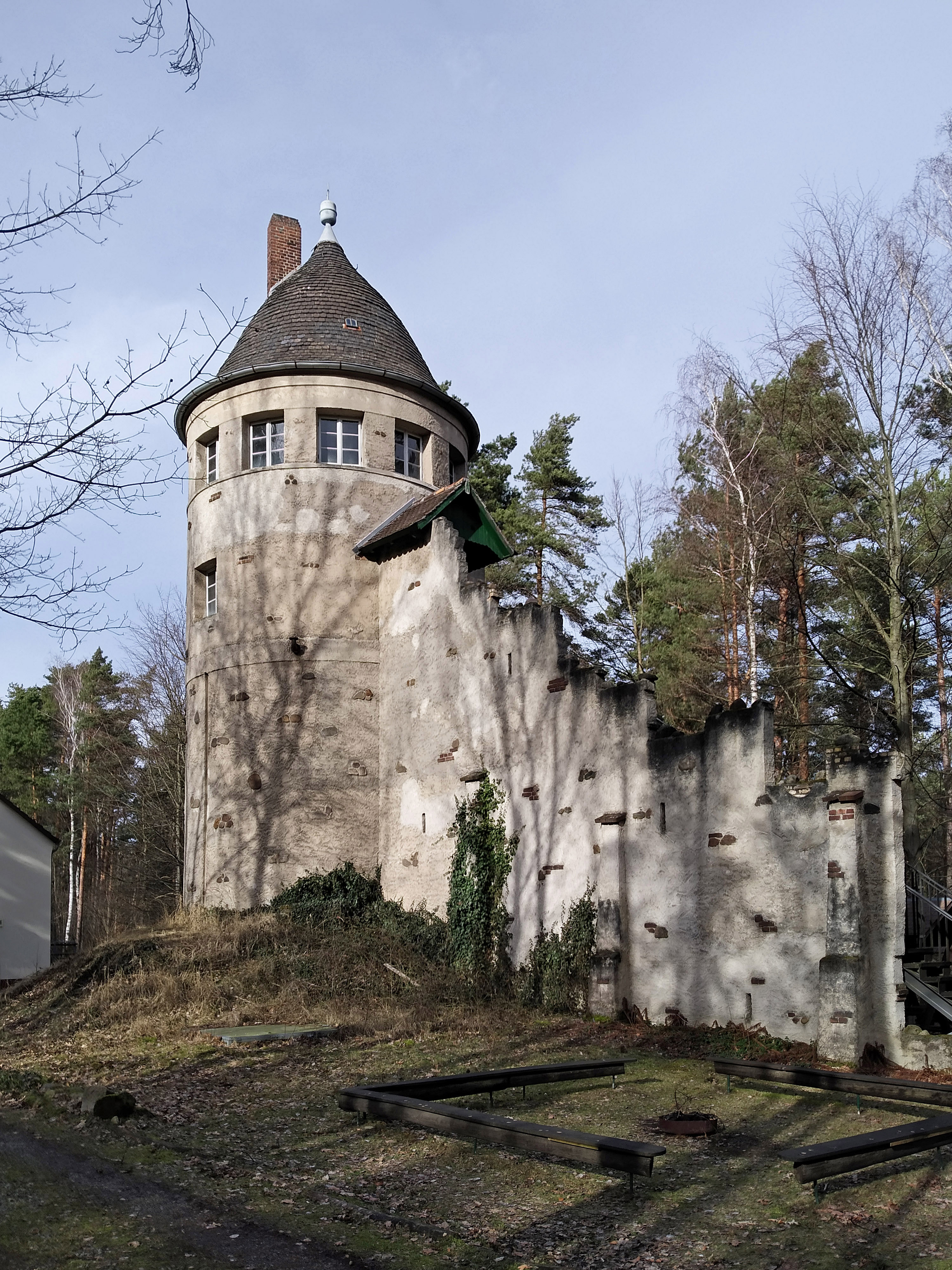

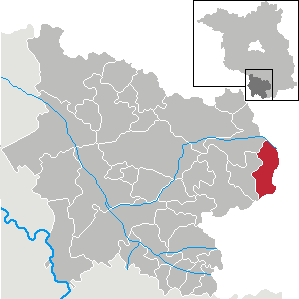
- Location of Sallgast within Elbe-Elster district
- Interactive map of Sallgast
- Location within Germany Location within Brandenburg
- Coordinates: 51°35′21″N 13°50′50″E
- Country: Germany
- State: Brandenburg
- District: Elbe-Elster
- Municipal assoc.: Kleine Elster (Niederlausitz)
- Subdivisions: 9 Ortsteile

Government
  - Mayor (2024–29): Frank Tischer

Area
  - Total: 41.90 km^{2} (16.18 sq mi)
- Elevation: 127 m (417 ft)

Population (2025-12-31)
  - Total: 1,413
  - Density: 33.72/km^{2} (87.34/sq mi)
- Time zone: UTC+01:00 (CET)
  - Summer (DST): UTC+02:00 (CEST)
- Postal codes: 03238
- Dialling codes: 035329
- Vehicle registration: EE, FI, LIB
- Website: www.sallgast.de

Sallgast is a municipality in the Elbe-Elster district, in Lower Lusatia, Brandenburg, Germany.

== History ==
From 1815 to 1947, Sallgast was part of the Prussian Province of Brandenburg. From 1952 to 1990, it was part of the Bezirk Cottbus of East Germany.

== Demography ==
Development of Population since 1875 within the Current Boundaries (Blue Line: Population; Dotted Line: Comparison to Population Development of Brandenburg state; Grey Background: Time of Nazi rule; Red Background: Time of Communist rule)

Sallgast: Population development within the current boundaries (2013)

Year	Population
1875	1 452
1890	1 880
1910	4 073
1925	3 800
1933	3 728
1939	3 411
1946	4 376
1950	4 200
1964	3 253
1971	2 958

Year	Population
1981	2 453
1985	2 341
1989	2 010
1990	1 930
1991	1 842
1992	1 789
1993	2 029
1994	1 809
1995	1 795
1996	1 770

Year	Population
1997	1 819
1998	1 792
1999	1 778
2000	1 790
2001	1 793
2002	1 810
2003	1 819
2004	1 802
2005	1 772
2006	1 734

Year	Population
2007	1 727
2008	1 712
2009	1 669
2010	1 630
2011	1 495
2012	1 523
2013	1 491
2014	1 479
2015	1 458
2016	1 445
