= Lebusa =

- Municipality
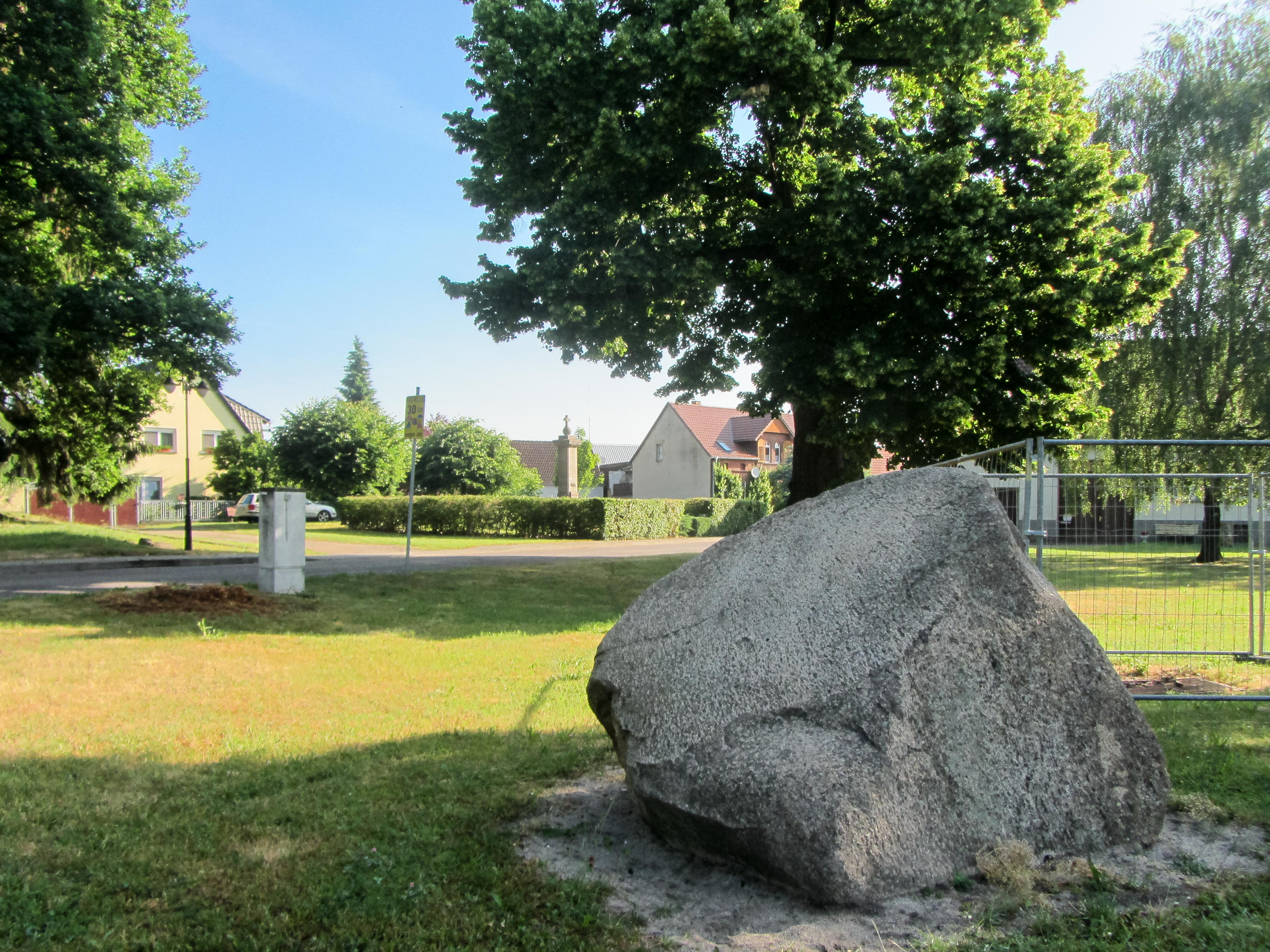

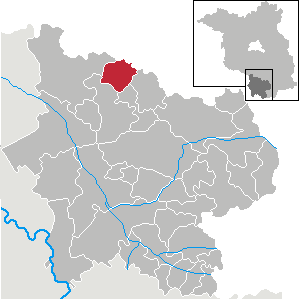
- Location of Lebusa within Elbe-Elster district
- Interactive map of Lebusa
- Location within Germany Location within Brandenburg
- Coordinates: 51°48′N 13°26′E
- Country: Germany
- State: Brandenburg
- District: Elbe-Elster
- Municipal assoc.: Schlieben
- Subdivisions: 3 Ortsteile

Government
  - Mayor (2024–29): Marcus Klee

Area
  - Total: 33.65 km^{2} (12.99 sq mi)
- Elevation: 102 m (335 ft)

Population (2025-12-31)
  - Total: 785
  - Density: 23.3/km^{2} (60.4/sq mi)
- Time zone: UTC+01:00 (CET)
  - Summer (DST): UTC+02:00 (CEST)
- Postal codes: 04936
- Dialling codes: 035364
- Vehicle registration: EE, FI, LIB

Lebusa (Lower Sorbian: Lubuš) is a municipality in the Elbe-Elster district, in Brandenburg, Germany.

== History ==
From 1815 to 1944, Lebusa was part of the Prussian Province of Saxony. From 1944 to 1945, it was part of the Province of Halle-Merseburg. From 1952 to 1990, it was part of the Bezirk Cottbus of East Germany.

== Demography ==
Development of Population since 1875 within the Current Boundaries (Blue Line: Population; Dotted Line: Comparison to Population Development of Brandenburg state; Grey Background: Time of Nazi rule; Red Background: Time of Communist rule)

Lebusa: Population development within the current boundaries

Year	Population
1875	680
1890	720
1910	730
1925	845
1933	797
1939	782
1946	1 339
1950	1 464
1964	1 218
1971	1 177

Year	Population
1981	1 000
1985	992
1989	995
1990	1 001
1991	989
1992	972
1993	987
1994	1 006
1995	1 003
1996	992

Year	Population
1997	997
1998	976
1999	973
2000	955
2001	935
2002	956
2003	933
2004	928
2005	911
2006	893

Year	Population
2007	875
2008	866
2009	852
2010	832
2011	823
2012	799

Detailed data sources are to be found in the Wikimedia Commons.
