= Hohenbucko =

- Municipality
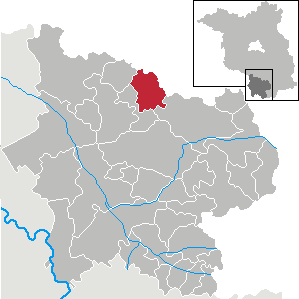
- Location of Hohenbucko within Elbe-Elster district
- Interactive map of Hohenbucko
- Location within Germany Location within Brandenburg
- Coordinates: 51°46′00″N 13°28′00″E
- Country: Germany
- State: Brandenburg
- District: Elbe-Elster
- Municipal assoc.: Schlieben
- Subdivisions: 2 Ortsteile

Government
  - Mayor (2024–29): Kay Benesch

Area
  - Total: 42.67 km^{2} (16.47 sq mi)
- Elevation: 131 m (430 ft)

Population (2025-12-31)
  - Total: 613
  - Density: 14.4/km^{2} (37.2/sq mi)
- Time zone: UTC+01:00 (CET)
  - Summer (DST): UTC+02:00 (CEST)
- Postal codes: 04936
- Dialling codes: 035364
- Vehicle registration: EE, FI, LIB

Hohenbucko is a municipality in the Elbe-Elster district, in Brandenburg, Germany.

== History ==
From 1815 to 1944, Hohenbucko was part of the Prussian Province of Saxony. From 1944 to 1945, it was part of the Province of Halle-Merseburg. From 1952 to 1990, it was part of the Bezirk Cottbus of East Germany.

== Demography ==
Development of Population since 1875 within the Current Boundaries (Blue Line: Population; Dotted Line: Comparison to Population Development of Brandenburg state; Grey Background: Time of Nazi rule; Red Background: Time of Communist rule)

Hohenbucko: Population development within the current boundaries (2013)

Year	Population
1875	790
1890	790
1910	800
1925	798
1933	811
1939	750
1946	1 152
1950	1 195
1964	1 020
1971	982

Year	Population
1981	952
1985	935
1989	903
1990	882
1991	850
1992	843
1993	847
1994	848
1995	838
1996	831

Year	Population
1997	809
1998	801
1999	771
2000	778
2001	777
2002	778
2003	749
2004	738
2005	727
2006	712

Year	Population
2007	709
2008	696
2009	691
2010	686
2011	683
2012	674
2013	663
2014	655
2015	646
2016	640
