= Schönewalde =

- Town
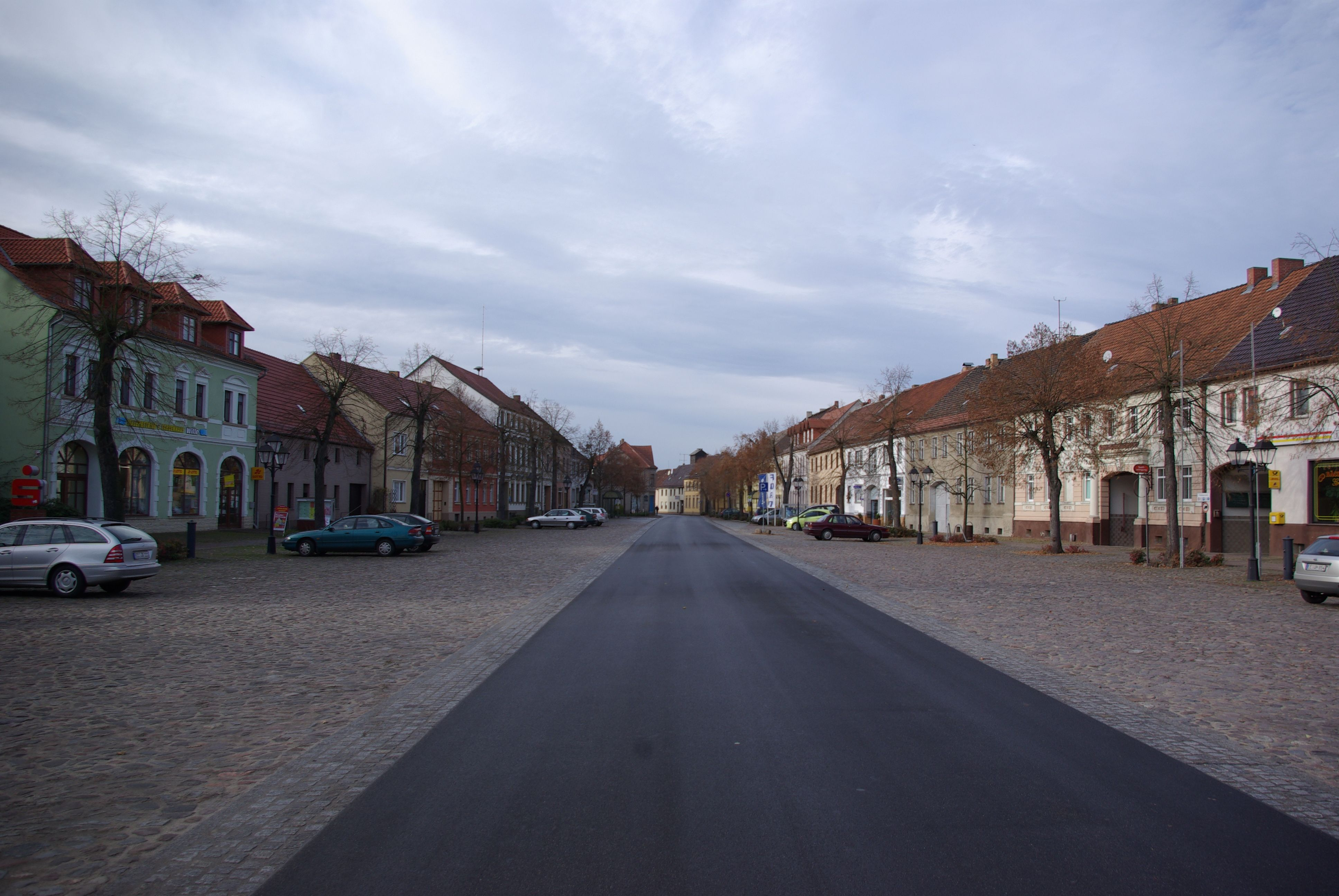
- Market square

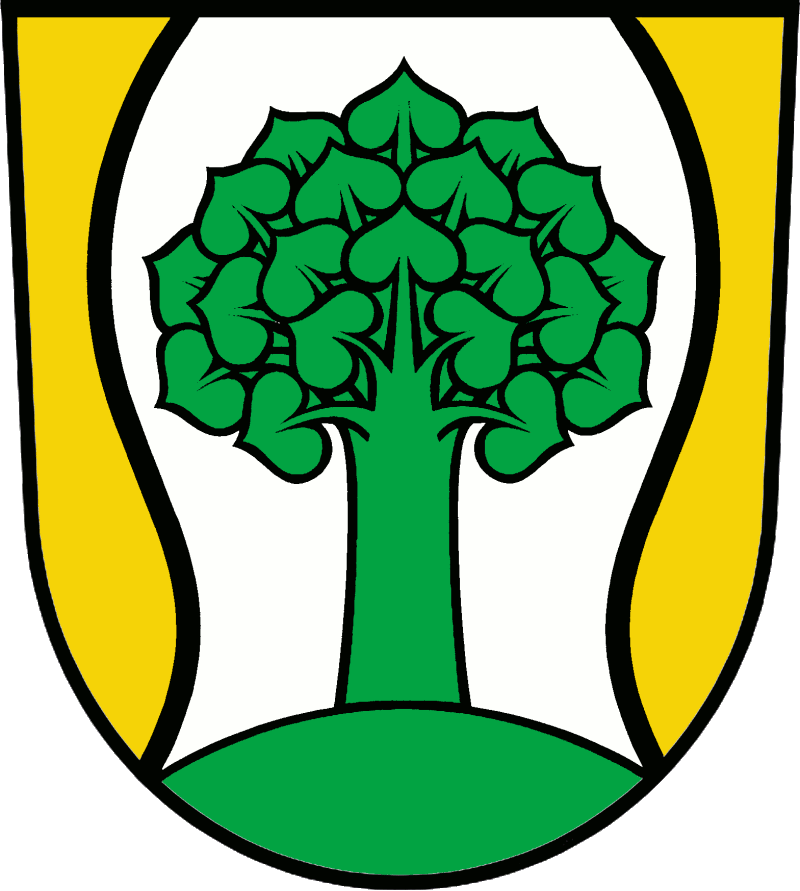
- Coat of arms

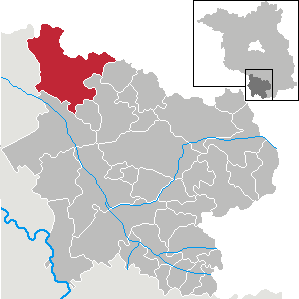
- Location of Schönewalde within Elbe-Elster district
- Interactive map of Schönewalde
- Location within Germany Location within Brandenburg
- Coordinates: 51°48′45″N 13°13′22″E
- Country: Germany
- State: Brandenburg
- District: Elbe-Elster
- Subdivisions: 17 Ortsteile

Government
  - Mayor (2021–29): Michael Stawski

Area
  - Total: 156.18 km^{2} (60.30 sq mi)
- Elevation: 79 m (259 ft)

Population (2025-12-31)
  - Total: 2,827
  - Density: 18.10/km^{2} (46.88/sq mi)
- Time zone: UTC+01:00 (CET)
  - Summer (DST): UTC+02:00 (CEST)
- Postal codes: 04916
- Dialling codes: 035362
- Vehicle registration: EE, FI, LIB
- Website: www.schoenewalde.de

Schönewalde (German pronunciation: [ʃøːnəˈvaldə]) is a town in the Elbe-Elster district, in southwestern Brandenburg, Germany. It is situated in the Fläming Heath, 30 km south of Luckenwalde, and 40 km east of Wittenberg.

== History ==
From 1815 to 1944, Schönewalde was part of the Prussian Province of Saxony. From 1944 to 1945, it was part of the Province of Halle-Merseburg. From 1952 to 1990, it was part of the Bezirk Cottbus of East Germany.

== Demography ==
Development of population since 1875 within the current Boundaries (Blue Line: Population; Dotted Line: Comparison to Population development in Brandenburg state; Grey Background: Time of Nazi Germany; Red Background: Time of communist East Germany)

Recent Population Development and Projections (Population Development before Census 2011 (blue line); Recent Population Development according to the Census in Germany in 2011 (blue bordered line); Official projections for 2005-2030 (yellow line); for 2017-2030 (scarlet line); for 2020-2030 (green line)

Schönewalde: Population development
within the current boundaries (2025)

Year	Pop.	±% p.a.
1875	4,978	—
1890	5,003	+0.03%
1910	4,790	−0.22%
1925	4,765	−0.03%
1933	4,593	−0.46%
1939	4,379	−0.79%
1946	6,616	+6.07%

Year	Pop.	±% p.a.
1950	6,466	−0.57%
1964	5,155	−1.61%
1971	5,002	−0.43%
1981	4,449	−1.16%
1985	4,313	−0.77%
1990	4,163	−0.71%
1995	4,055	−0.52%

Year	Pop.	±% p.a.
2000	3,939	−0.58%
2005	3,702	−1.23%
2010	3,307	−2.23%
2015	3,115	−1.19%
2020	3,056	−0.38%
2025	2,827	−1.55%
