= Merzdorf =

- Municipality
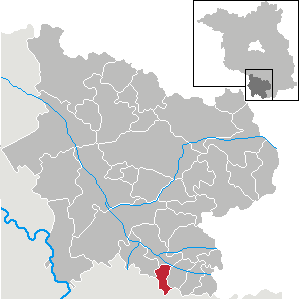
- Location of Merzdorf within Elbe-Elster district
- Interactive map of Merzdorf
- Location within Germany Location within Brandenburg
- Coordinates: 51°24′N 13°32′E
- Country: Germany
- State: Brandenburg
- District: Elbe-Elster
- Municipal assoc.: Schradenland

Government
  - Mayor (2024–29): Andreas Fiebak

Area
  - Total: 12.73 km^{2} (4.92 sq mi)
- Elevation: 100 m (330 ft)

Population (2025-12-31)
  - Total: 811
  - Density: 63.7/km^{2} (165/sq mi)
- Time zone: UTC+01:00 (CET)
  - Summer (DST): UTC+02:00 (CEST)
- Postal codes: 04932
- Dialling codes: 03533
- Vehicle registration: EE, FI, LIB
- Website: www.amt-schradenland.de

Merzdorf is a municipality in the Elbe-Elster district, in Brandenburg, Germany.

== History ==
From 1952 to 1990, Merzdorf was part of the Bezirk Cottbus of East Germany.

== Demography ==
Development of Population since 1875 within the Current Boundaries (Blue Line: Population; Dotted Line: Comparison to Population Development of Brandenburg state; Grey Background: Time of Nazi rule; Red Background: Time of Communist rule)

Merzdorf: Population development
within the current boundaries (2017)

Year	Pop.	±% p.a.
1875	400	—
1890	450	+0.79%
1910	500	+0.53%
1925	848	+3.58%
1933	842	−0.09%
1939	891	+0.95%
1946	1,207	+4.43%
1950	1,154	−1.12%
1964	1,130	−0.15%
1971	1,117	−0.17%
1981	1,112	−0.04%
1985	1,163	+1.13%
1989	1,155	−0.17%
1990	1,129	−2.25%

Year	Pop.	±% p.a.
1991	1,102	−2.39%
1992	1,081	−1.91%
1993	1,083	+0.19%
1994	1,076	−0.65%
1995	1,075	−0.09%
1996	1,072	−0.28%
1997	1,066	−0.56%
1998	1,053	−1.22%
1999	1,046	−0.66%
2000	1,030	−1.53%
2001	1,029	−0.10%
2002	996	−3.21%
2003	988	−0.80%
2004	982	−0.61%

Year	Pop.	±% p.a.
2005	962	−2.04%
2006	952	−1.04%
2007	947	−0.53%
2008	935	−1.27%
2009	912	−2.46%
2010	904	−0.88%
2011	878	−2.88%
2012	863	−1.71%
2013	862	−0.12%
2014	858	−0.46%
2015	825	−3.85%
2016	824	−0.12%
2017	817	−0.85%
