= Großthiemig =

- Municipality
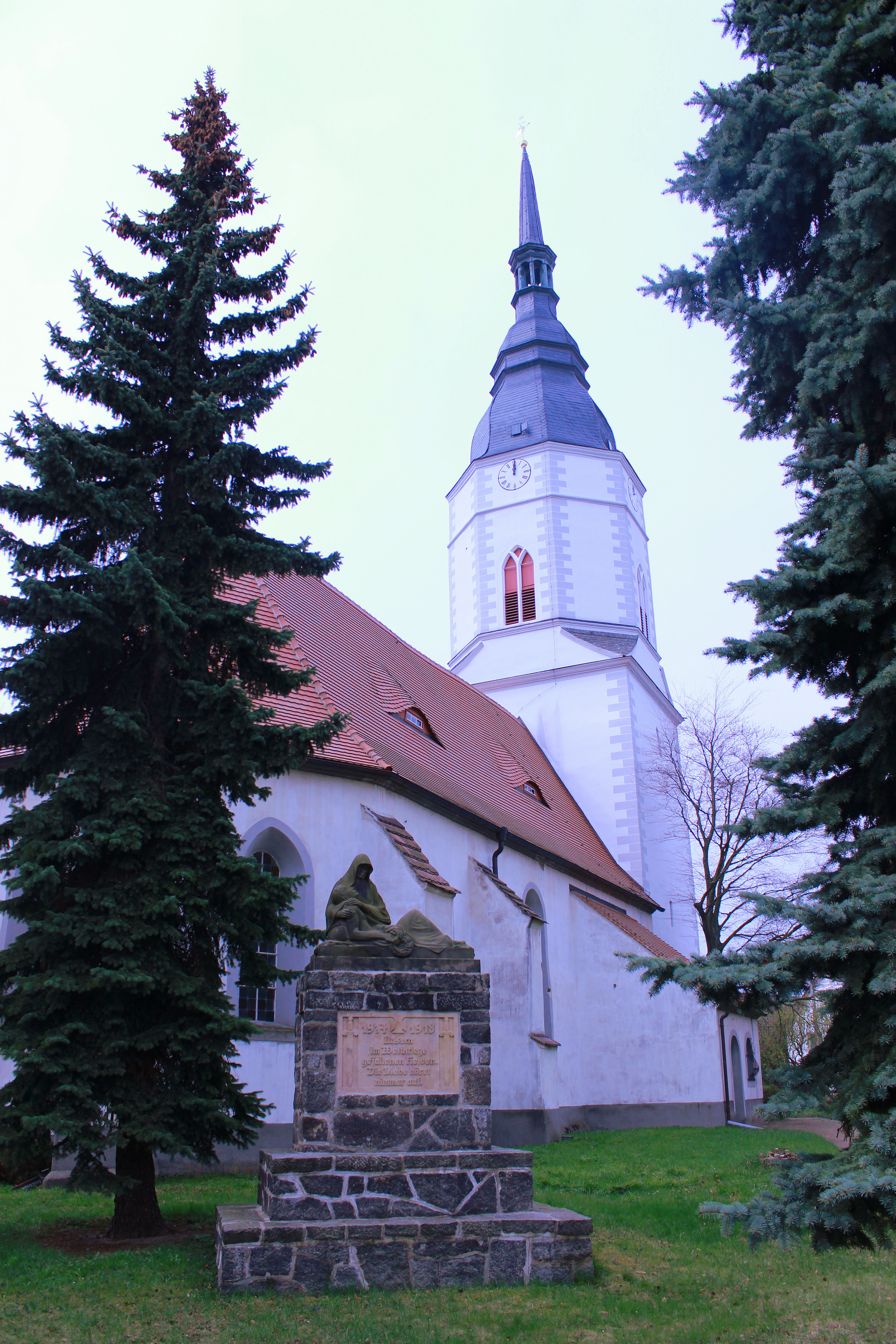
- Church in Großthiemig

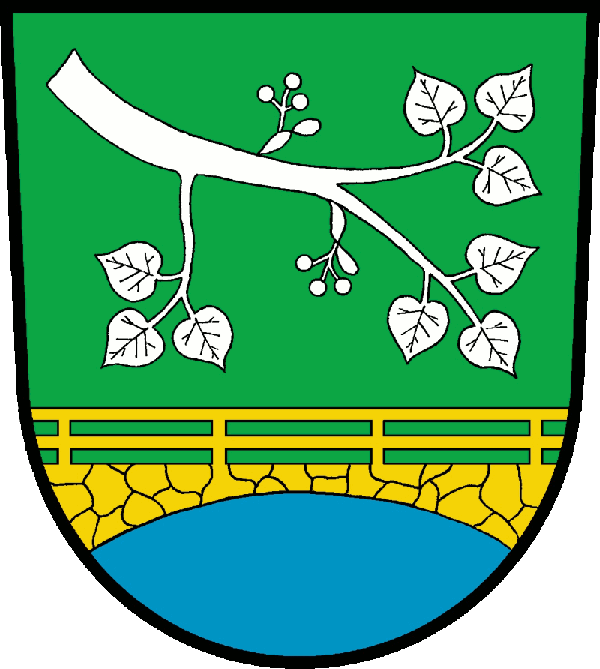
- Coat of arms

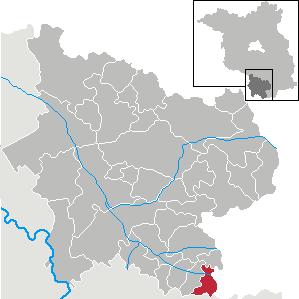
- Location of Großthiemig within Elbe-Elster district
- Interactive map of Großthiemig
- Location within Germany Location within Brandenburg
- Coordinates: 51°22′59″N 13°40′00″E
- Country: Germany
- State: Brandenburg
- District: Elbe-Elster
- Municipal assoc.: Schradenland

Government
  - Mayor (2024–29): Heiko Imhof (Ind.)

Area
  - Total: 20.10 km^{2} (7.76 sq mi)
- Elevation: 113 m (371 ft)

Population (2025-12-31)
  - Total: 965
  - Density: 48.0/km^{2} (124/sq mi)
- Time zone: UTC+01:00 (CET)
  - Summer (DST): UTC+02:00 (CEST)
- Postal codes: 04932
- Dialling codes: 035343
- Vehicle registration: EE, FI, LIB
- Website: www.grossthiemig.info

Großthiemig is a municipality in the Elbe-Elster district, in Brandenburg, Germany.

== History ==
From 1952 to 1990, Großthiemig was part of the Bezirk Cottbus of East Germany.

== Demography ==
Development of Population since 1875 within the Current Boundaries (Blue Line: Population; Dotted Line: Comparison to Population Development of Brandenburg state; Grey Background: Time of Nazi rule; Red Background: Time of Communist rule)

Großthiemig: Population development
within the current boundaries (2017)

Year	Pop.	±% p.a.
1875	1,200	—
1890	1,300	+0.54%
1910	1,400	+0.37%
1925	1,516	+0.53%
1933	1,281	−2.08%
1939	1,274	−0.09%
1946	1,776	+4.86%
1950	1,742	−0.48%
1964	1,554	−0.81%
1971	1,568	+0.13%
1981	1,529	−0.25%
1985	1,479	−0.83%
1989	1,462	−0.29%
1990	1,455	−0.48%

Year	Pop.	±% p.a.
1991	1,414	−2.82%
1992	1,388	−1.84%
1993	1,398	+0.72%
1994	1,390	−0.57%
1995	1,368	−1.58%
1996	1,350	−1.32%
1997	1,346	−0.30%
1998	1,323	−1.71%
1999	1,295	−2.12%
2000	1,315	+1.54%
2001	1,305	−0.76%
2002	1,287	−1.38%
2003	1,285	−0.16%
2004	1,242	−3.35%

Year	Pop.	±% p.a.
2005	1,203	−3.14%
2006	1,198	−0.42%
2007	1,190	−0.67%
2008	1,184	−0.50%
2009	1,157	−2.28%
2010	1,158	+0.09%
2011	1,129	−2.50%
2012	1,103	−2.30%
2013	1,092	−1.00%
2014	1,059	−3.02%
2015	1,073	+1.32%
2016	1,043	−2.80%
2017	1,039	−0.38%
