= Gröden =

- Municipality
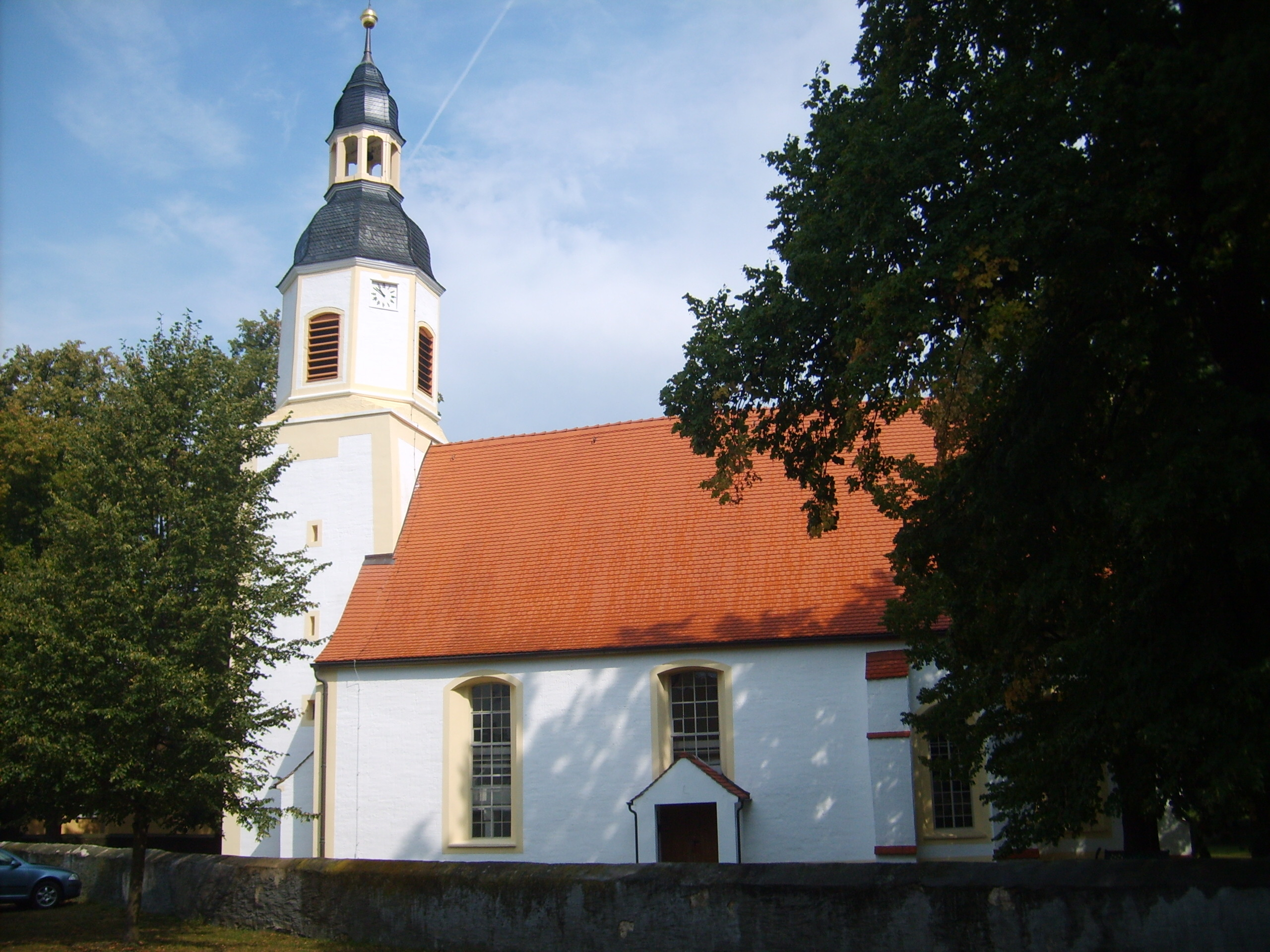
- Church in Gröden

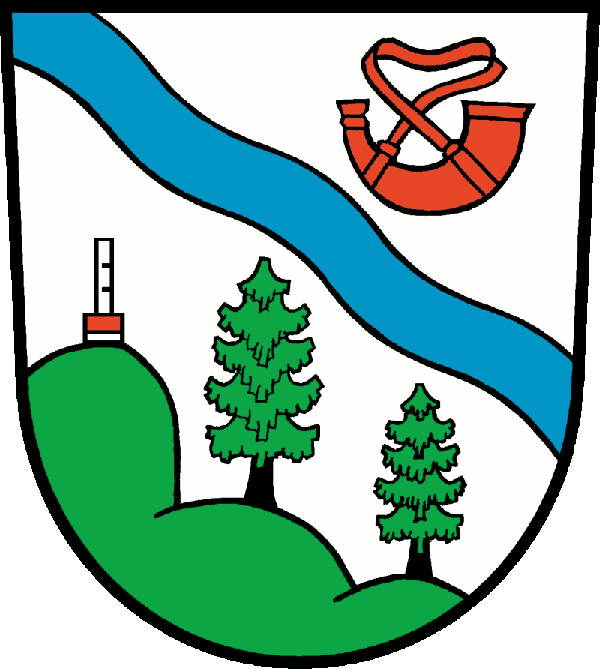
- Coat of arms

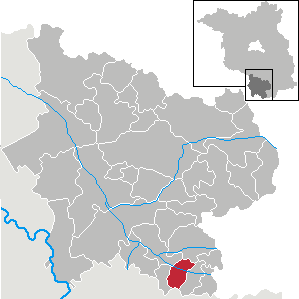
- Location of Gröden within Elbe-Elster district
- Interactive map of Gröden
- Location within Germany Location within Brandenburg
- Coordinates: 51°23′59″N 13°34′00″E
- Country: Germany
- State: Brandenburg
- District: Elbe-Elster
- Municipal assoc.: Schradenland

Government
  - Mayor (2024–29): Sebastian Rick (CDU)

Area
  - Total: 22.14 km^{2} (8.55 sq mi)
- Elevation: 112 m (367 ft)

Population (2025-12-31)
  - Total: 1,316
  - Density: 59.44/km^{2} (153.9/sq mi)
- Time zone: UTC+01:00 (CET)
  - Summer (DST): UTC+02:00 (CEST)
- Postal codes: 04932
- Dialling codes: 035343
- Vehicle registration: EE, FI, LIB
- Website: www.gemeinde-groeden.de

Gröden (German pronunciation: [ˈɡʁøːdn̩]) is a municipality in the Elbe-Elster district, in Brandenburg, Germany.

== History ==
From 1952 to 1990, Gröden was part of the Bezirk Cottbus of East Germany.

== Demography ==
Development of Population since 1875 within the Current Boundaries (Blue Line: Population; Dotted Line: Comparison to Population Development of Brandenburg state; Grey Background: Time of Nazi rule; Red Background: Time of Communist rule)

Gröden: Population development
within the current boundaries (2017)

Year	Pop.	±% p.a.
1875	1,000	—
1890	1,050	+0.33%
1910	1,100	+0.23%
1925	1,284	+1.04%
1933	1,378	+0.89%
1939	1,442	+0.76%
1946	1,991	+4.72%
1950	1,939	−0.66%
1964	1,671	−1.06%
1971	1,686	+0.13%
1981	1,721	+0.21%
1985	1,842	+1.71%
1989	1,866	+0.32%
1990	1,823	−2.30%

Year	Pop.	±% p.a.
1991	1,805	−0.99%
1992	1,785	−1.11%
1993	1,768	−0.95%
1994	1,761	−0.40%
1995	1,747	−0.80%
1996	1,726	−1.20%
1997	1,729	+0.17%
1998	1,722	−0.40%
1999	1,704	−1.05%
2000	1,707	+0.18%
2001	1,691	−0.94%
2002	1,670	−1.24%
2003	1,653	−1.02%
2004	1,645	−0.48%

Year	Pop.	±% p.a.
2005	1,629	−0.97%
2006	1,613	−0.98%
2007	1,596	−1.05%
2008	1,577	−1.19%
2009	1,560	−1.08%
2010	1,529	−1.99%
2011	1,477	−3.40%
2012	1,450	−1.83%
2013	1,401	−3.38%
2014	1,404	+0.21%
2015	1,373	−2.21%
2016	1,378	+0.36%
2017	1,347	−2.25%
